= List of knights and dames commander of the Order of the Bath appointed by Elizabeth II (2003–2022) =

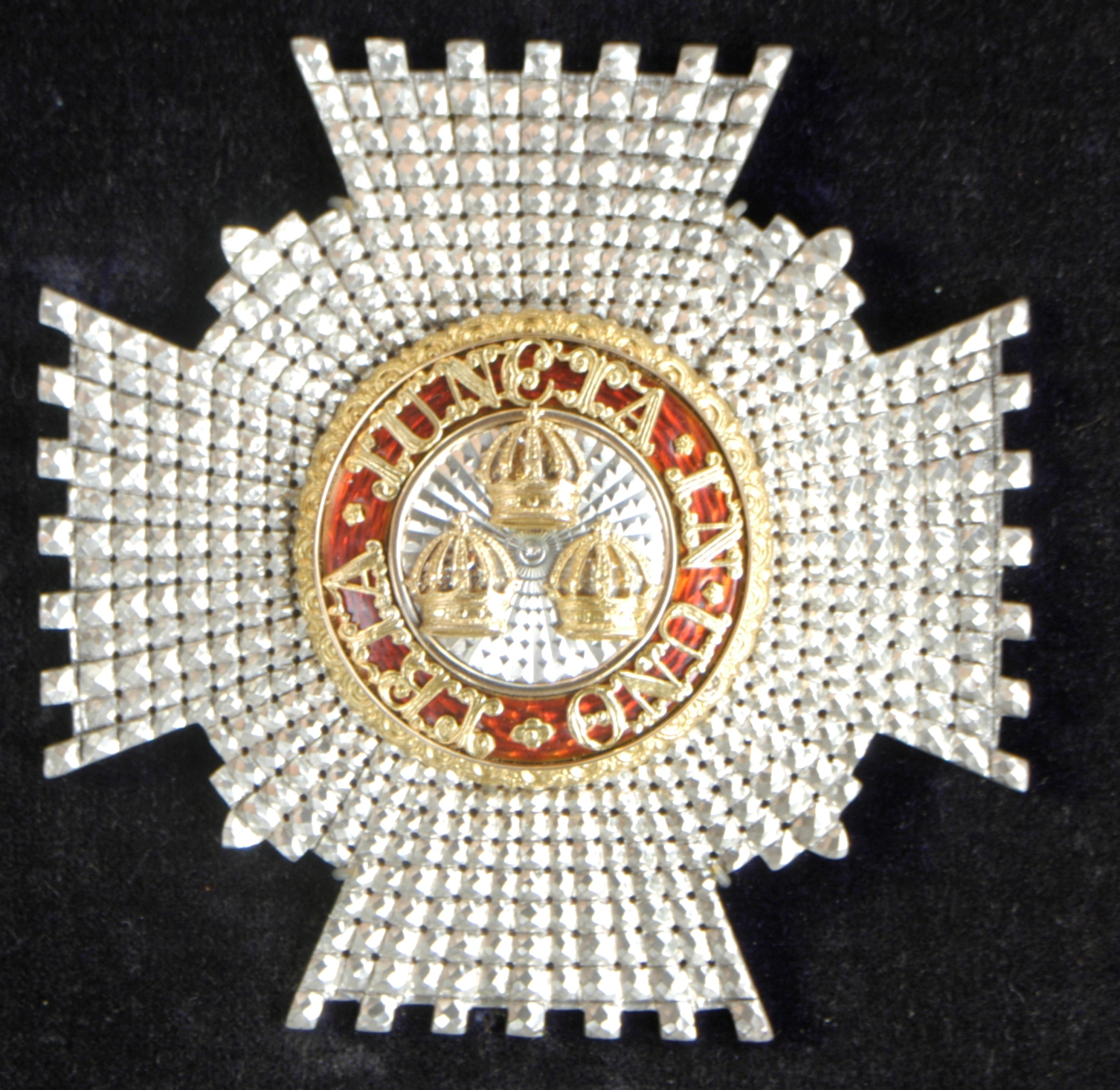
The star of a civil Knight or Dame Commander of the Order of the Bath

The Most Honourable Order of the Bath is an order of knighthood awarded by the sovereign of the United Kingdom and several Commonwealth realms. It is granted by the monarch on the advice of the Prime Minister and recognises military service and civilian merit; it is typically awarded to senior military officers and a select number of the most senior civil servants. Knights of the Bath were appointed in the medieval and early modern period on special occasions, such as the coronation of the monarch; their name derived from the practice of bathing as a purification ritual before knighthood. However, although medieval and early modern "knights of the bath" took precedence over Knights Bachelor, they were never a formally organised order. Charles II still made a number of appointments at his coronation in 1661, but the practice had largely ceased by the early 18th century. In 1725, George I, on the advice of his Prime Minister Robert Walpole, instituted the modern Order of the Bath to revive the medieval "order" and provide a new source of patronage for his government. As well as the sovereign, the new order had a Great Master and 36 Knights Companion.

In 1815, the order was split into military and civil divisions and the number of grades was expanded, with the most senior being Knight Grand Cross, the next being Knight Commander, and the lowest grade being Companion; this structure has remained largely unmodified, although in 1971 women were admitted to the order (those appointed to the highest two grades would be Dames Grand Cross and Dames Commander respectively). Limits to the number of appointments made to each grade have altered over time; as of 2018, there can be no more than 115 Knights or Dames Grand Cross (GCB), 328 Knights or Dames Commanders (KCB or DCB), and 1,815 Companions (CB) at any time. The most senior grades confer the status of knighthood on holders, although foreigners (who typically receive honorary awards) are not usually entitled to the style.

== List of knights and dames commander ==
| Name | Date | Military/Civil | Notes | References |
|---|---|---|---|---|
| Admiral Ian Andrew Forbes, CBE | 14 June 2003 | M | | |
| Brian Geoffrey Bender, CB | 14 June 2003 | C | Permanent Secretary, Department for Environment, Food and Rural Affairs | |
| Richard John Broadbent | 14 June 2003 | C | Chairman, HM Customs and Excise | |
| Air Marshal Brian Kevin Burridge, CBE, ADC | 31 October 2003 | M | (Royal Air Force). For "gallant and distinguished services whilst on operations in Iraq during the period 19 March to 19 April 2003". | |
| Lieutenant-General John George Reith, CB, CBE | 31 October 2003 | M | (Formerly The Parachute Regiment). For "gallant and distinguished services whilst on operations in Iraq during the period 19 March to 19 April 2003". | |
| Vice-Admiral Mark Stanhope, OBE | 31 December 2003 | M | (Royal Navy) | |
| Marvis McDonald, CB | 31 December 2003 | C | Permanent Secretary, Office of the Deputy Prime Minister | |
| Juliet Louise Wheldon, CB, QC | 31 December 2003 | C | HM Procurator General, Treasury Solicitor and Head of Government Legal Service | |
| Vice-Admiral James Michael Burnell-Nugent, CBE, ADC | 12 June 2004 | M | (Royal Navy) | |
| Lieutenant-General Francis Richard Dannatt, CBE, MC | 12 June 2004 | M | (Formerly The Green Howards) | |
| Edwin Geoffrey Bowman, CB | 12 June 2004 | C | First Parliamentary Counsel | |
| Lieutenant-General (Local General) Kevin O'Donoghue, CBE | 31 December 2004 | M | (Formerly Corps of Royal Engineers) | |
| Air Marshal Glenn Lester Torpy, CBE, DSO | 31 December 2004 | M | (Royal Air Force) | |
| Edward John Watson Gieve, CB | 31 December 2004 | C | Permanent Secretary, Home Office | |
| David John Normington, CB | 31 December 2004 | C | Permanent Secretary, Department for Education and Skills | |
| Lieutenant-General Robert Alan Fry, CBE | 11 June 2005 | M | | |
| Hon. Elizabeth Manningham-Buller | 11 June 2005 | C | Director General, Security Service | |
| Susan Ruth Street | 11 June 2005 | C | Permanent Secretary, Department for Culture, Media and Sport | |
| Augustine Thomas O'Donnell, CB | 11 June 2005 | C | Permanent Secretary, HM Treasury | |
| Air Marshal Clive Robert Loader, OBE | 31 December 2005 | M | | |
| Sumantra Chakrabarti | 31 December 2005 | C | Permanent Secretary, Department for International Development | |
| Vice-Admiral Timothy Pentreath McClement, OBE | 17 June 2006 | M | (Royal Navy) | |
| John Elvidge | 17 June 2006 | C | Permanent Secretary, Scottish Executive | |
| David Rowlands, CB | 17 June 2006 | C | Permanent Secretary, Department for Transport | |
| Roger Blakemore Sands | 17 June 2006 | C | Clerk of the House and Chief Executive, House of Commons | |
| Lieutenant-General Frederick Richard Viggers, CMG, MBE | 30 December 2006 | M | (Formerly Royal Regiment of Artillery) | |
| Air Marshal Barry Michael Thornton, CB | 16 June 2007 | M | (Royal Air Force) | |
| Paul David Grenville Hayter, LVO | 16 June 2007 | C | Clerk of the Parliaments, House of Lords | |
| Leigh Warren Lewis, CB | 16 June 2007 | C | Permanent Secretary, Department for Work and Pensions | |
| Vice-Admiral Adrian James Johns, CBE, ADC | 29 December 2007 | M | (Royal Navy) | |
| General John Chalmers McColl, CBE, DSO | 29 December 2007 | M | (Formerly The Royal Anglian Regiment) | |
| General Sir Charles Redmond Watt, KCVO, CBE, ADC(Gen) | 29 December 2007 | M | (Formerly Welsh Guards) | |
| Nigel Hamilton | 29 December 2007 | C | Head of the Northern Ireland Civil Service | |
| William Alexander Jeffrey, CB | 29 December 2007 | C | Permanent Secretary, Ministry of Defence | |
| Lieutenant-General John Nicholas Reynolds Houghton, CBE | 14 June 2008 | M | (Formerly The Green Howards) | |
| Helen Frances Ghosh | 14 June 2008 | C | Permanent Secretary, Department for the Environment, Food and Rural Affairs | |
| Vice-Admiral Trevor Alan Soar, OBE | 31 December 2008 | M | (Royal Navy) | |
| Air Marshal Christopher Hugh Moran, OBE, MVO | 31 December 2008 | M | (Royal Air Force) | |
| Air Marshal Stuart William Peach, CBE | 31 December 2008 | M | (Royal Air Force) | |
| Nicholas MacPherson | 31 December 2008 | C | Permanent Secretary, HM Treasury | |
| Jonathan Phillips | 31 December 2008 | C | Permanent Secretary, Northern Ireland Office | |
| Vice-Admiral Alan Michael Massey, CBE, ADC | 13 June 2009 | M | (Royal Navy) | |
| Lieutenant-General Nicholas Ralph Parker, CBE | 13 June 2009 | M | (Formerly The Royal Green Jackets) | |
| Lieutenant-General Peter Anthony Wall, CBE | 13 June 2009 | M | (Formerly Corps of Royal Engineers) | |
| Air Marshal Stephen Gary George Dalton, CB | 13 June 2009 | M | (Royal Air Force) | |
| Karen Dunnell | 13 June 2009 | C | National Statistician and Registrar-General for England and Wales, Office for National Statistics | |
| Hugh Henderson Taylor, CB | 13 June 2009 | C | Permanent Secretary, Department for Health | |
| Lieutenant-General William Raoul Rollo, CBE | 31 December 2009 | M | (Formerly The Blues and Royals) | |
| Lieutenant-General Alexander Richard David Shirreff, CBE | 31 December 2009 | M | (Formerly The King's Royal Hussars) | |
| David Nicholson, CBE | 31 December 2009 | C | Permanent Secretary and Chief Executive of the National Health Service | |
| Lieutenant-General James Benjamin Dutton, CBE | 12 June 2010 | M | (Royal Marines) | |
| Peter James Housden | 12 June 2010 | C | Permanent Secretary, Department for Communities and Local Government | |
| Lieutenant-General David Robert Bill, CB | 31 December 2010 | M | (Formerly Corps of Royal Engineers) | |
| Air Chief Marshal Simon Bryant, CBE, ADC | 31 December 2010 | M | (Royal Air Force) | |
| Stephen Charles Laws, CB | 31 December 2010 | C | First Parliamentary Counsel, Office of the Parliamentary Counsel | |
| Bruce Robinson | 31 December 2010 | C | Head of the Northern Ireland Civil Service | |
| Lieutenant-General Barnabas William Benjamin White-Spunner, CBE | 11 June 2011 | M | (Formerly The Blues and Royals) | |
| David Robert Bell | 11 June 2011 | C | Permanent Secretary, Department for Education | |
| Dr Malcolm Roy Jack | 11 June 2011 | C | Clerk of the House of Commons and Chief Executive | |
| Michael Graham Pownall | 11 June 2011 | C | Clerk of the Parliaments and Head of the House of Lords Administration | |
| Vice-Admiral Paul Lambert, CB | 31 December 2011 | M | (Royal Navy) | |
| Lieutenant-General Mark Francis Noel Mans, CBE | 31 December 2011 | M | (Formerly Corps of Royal Engineers) | |
| Air Marshal Kevin James Leeson, CBE | 31 December 2011 | M | (Royal Air Force) | |
| Alexander Claud Stuart Allan | 31 December 2011 | C | Chairman, Joint Intelligence Committee, and Head of Intelligence Assessment | |
| Jeremy John Heywood, CB, CVO | 31 December 2011 | C | Permanent Secretary, No. 10 Downing Street | |
| Admiral George Michael Zambellas, DSC | 16 June 2012 | M | (Royal Navy) | |
| Paul Christopher Jenkins | 16 June 2012 | C | Chief Executive and Permanent Secretary, Treasury Solicitor's Department | |
| Vice-Admiral Andrew David Hugh Mathews, CB | 29 December 2012 | M | (Royal Navy) | |
| Lieutenant-General James Jeffrey Corfield Bucknall, CBE | 29 December 2012 | M | (Formerly Coldstream Guards) | |
| Air Marshal Timothy Michael Anderson, CB, DSO | 29 December 2012 | M | (Royal Air Force) | |
| Air Marshal Andrew Douglas Pulford, CBE | 29 December 2012 | M | (Royal Air Force) | |
| Ursula Brennan | 29 December 2012 | C | Permanent Secretary, Ministry of Justice. For public and voluntary service. | |
| Jonathan Evans | 29 December 2012 | C | For services to defence. | |
| Robert James Rogers | 29 December 2012 | C | Clerk of the House and Chief Executive, House of Commons. For parliamentary and public service | |
| Lieutenant-General Richard Lawson Barrons, CBE, ADC(Gen) | 15 June 2013 | M | (Formerly Royal Regiment of Artillery) | |
| Lieutenant-General Adrian John Bradshaw, CB, OBE | 15 June 2013 | M | (Formerly The King's Royal Hussars) | |
| Jonathan Andrew de Sievrac Stephens | 15 June 2013 | C | Permanent Secretary, Department for Culture, Media and Sport. For public service, especially to the London 2012 Olympic and Paralympic Games | |
| Lieutenant-General David Andrew Capewell, OBE | 31 December 2013 | M | (Royal Marines) | |
| Lieutenant-General Nicholas Patrick Carter, CBE, DSO | 31 December 2013 | M | (Formerly The Royal Green Jackets) | |
| Air Marshal Stephen John Hillier, CBE, DFC | 31 December 2013 | M | (Royal Air Force) | |
| Derek William Jones, CB | 31 December 2013 | C | Permanent Secretary, Welsh Government. For public service, especially to economic and social conditions in Wales. | |
| Keir Starmer, QC | 31 December 2013 | C | Director of Public Prosecutions, Crown Prosecution Service. For services to law and criminal justice. | |
| Sir Christopher Geidt, KCVO, OBE (Additional Member) | 31 December 2013 | C(A) | The Queen's Private Secretary. For public service. | |
| Vice-Admiral Philip Andrew Jones, CB | 14 June 2014 | M | (Royal Navy) | |
| Jilian Norma Matheson | 14 June 2014 | C | National Statistician and Permanent Secretary, Office for National Statistics and Chief Executive, UK Statistics Authority. For services to Government Statistics. | |
| Amyas Charles Edward Morse | 14 June 2014 | C | Comptroller and Auditor General, National Audit Office. For services to Parliament and public sector audit. | |
| Lieutenant-General Christopher Michael Deverell, MBE | 31 December 2014 | M | (Formerly Royal Tank Regiment) | |
| Air Marshal Barry Mark North, OBE | 31 December 2014 | M | (Royal Air Force) | |
| Evan Paul Silk | 31 December 2014 | C | Chair, Commission on Devolution in Wales. For services to the Parliaments of and devolution in the United Kingdom. | |
| Una O'Brien, CB | 13 June 2015 | C | Permanent Secretary, Department of Health. For public service, particularly to healthcare. | |
| Lieutenant-General James Rupert Everard, CBE | 30 December 2015 | M | (Formerly The Queen's Royal Lancers) | |
| Linda Margaret Homer, CB | 30 December 2015 | C | Chief Executive, HM Revenue and Customs. For public service, particularly to public finance. | |
| Robert Devereux | 30 December 2015 | C | Permanent Secretary, Department for Work and Pensions. For services to transport and welfare and for voluntary service in Kilburn, London. | |
| General Gordon Kenneth Messenger, CB, DSO, OBE | 11 June 2016 | M | | |
| Lieutenant-General John Gordon Lorimer, DSO, MBE | 11 June 2016 | M | | |
| Martin Eugene Donnelly, CMG | 11 June 2016 | C | Permanent Secretary, Department for Business, Innovation and Skills. For public service, particularly to business. | |
| John Oliver Frank Kingman | 11 June 2016 | C | Second Permanent Secretary, HM Treasury. For public service, particularly to the economy. | |
| Dr Malcolm McKibbin | 11 June 2016 | C | Permanent Secretary and Head, Northern Ireland Civil Service. For public service. | |
| Michael Cathel Fallon | 4 August 2016 | C | Secretary of State for Defence. On the resignation of David Cameron as Prime Minister. | |
| David Richard Beamish | 31 December 2016 | C | Clerk of the Parliaments, House of Lords. For parliamentary service. | |
| Mark Andrew Lowcock, CB | 31 December 2016 | C | Permanent Secretary, Department for International Development. For public service, particularly to International Development. | |
| Vice-Admiral Simon Robert Lister, CB, OBE | 16 June 2017 | M | (Royal Navy) | |
| Claire Elizabeth Clancy | 16 June 2017 | C | Chief Executive and Clerk, National Assembly for Wales. For public service in Wales. | |
| Thomas Whinfield Scholar | 16 June 2017 | C | Permanent Secretary, HM Treasury. | |
| Christopher Stephen Wormald | 16 June 2017 | C | Permanent Secretary, Department of Health. | |
| Vice-Admiral Simon Jonathan Woodcock, OBE | 30 December 2017 | M | (Royal Navy) | |
| Philip McDougall Rutnam | 30 December 2017 | C | Permanent Secretary, Home Office. For public service. | |
| Lieutenant General Mark William Poffley, OBE | 9 June 2018 | M | (Army) | |
| Lieutenant General Thomas Anthony Beckett, CBE | 9 June 2018 | M | (Army) | |
| Susan Jane Owen, CB | 9 June 2018 | C | Permanent Secretary, Department for Digital, Culture, Media and Sport and Civil Service Champion for Diversity and Inclusion. For public service. | |
| David Lionel Natzler | 9 June 2018 | C | Clerk of the House of Commons. For Parliamentary Service. | |
| General Mark Alexander Popham Carleton-Smith, CBE, ADC (Gen.) | 29 December 2018 | M | (Army) | |
| Richard Heaton, CB | 29 December 2018 | C | Permanent Secretary, Ministry of Justice. For public service. | |
| Jonathan Michael Thompson | 29 December 2018 | C | Chief Executive, HM Revenue and Customs. For public service. | |
