= List of senior officers of the British Army =

This is a list of senior officers of the British Army. See also Commander in Chief of the Forces, Chief of the General Staff, and Chief of the Imperial General Staff.

== Captains-General of the British Army, 1707–1809 ==
See article on Captain general

== Commanders-in-Chief of the Forces, 1660–1904 ==
See article on Commander-in-Chief of the Forces

== Chiefs of the General Staff, 1904–1909 ==
See article on Chief of the General Staff (United Kingdom)

== Chiefs of the Imperial General Staff 1909–1964 ==
See article on Chief of the General Staff (United Kingdom)

== Chiefs of the General Staff, 1964– ==
See article on Chief of the General Staff (United Kingdom)

== Vice Chiefs of the Imperial General Staff ==
See article on Vice Chief of the General Staff (United Kingdom)

== Deputy Chiefs of the Imperial General Staff ==
See article on Deputy Chief of the General Staff (United Kingdom)

== Assistant Chiefs of the General Staff ==
See article on Assistant Chief of the General Staff (United Kingdom)

== Adjutant-general to the Forces / Commander Home Command ==
See article on Adjutant-General to the Forces (Commander Home Command since 2016).

== Quartermaster-General to the Forces / Chief of Materiel (Land) ==
See article on Quartermaster-General to the Forces

== Master-General of the Ordnance, 1415-2013 ==
See article on Master-General of the Ordnance

== Commander-in-Chief, UK Land Forces/UK Land Command/Land Forces ==
See article on Commander-in-Chief, Land Forces (Commander since 2011, Commander Field Army since 2016)

== (Deputy) Commander(-in-Chief), UK Land Forces/Field Army ==
See article on Deputy Commander Field Army

== Commander of Regional Forces, 2002-2009 ==
See article on Commander Regional Forces

== See also ==
- List of field marshals of the British Army
- List of British Army full generals
- List of British generals and brigadiers
