= Adjutant-General to the Forces =

Former senior British Army officer appointment

The Adjutant-General to the Forces, commonly just referred to as the Adjutant-General (AG), was for just over 250 years one of the most senior officers in the British Army. The AG was latterly responsible for developing the Army's personnel policies and supporting its people. The Adjutant-General usually held the rank of general or lieutenant general. Despite his administrative role, the Adjutant-General, like most officers above the rank of major general, was invariably drawn from one of the combat arms, not from the support corps.

== History ==
In origin the Adjutant-General was chief staff officer to the Commander-in-Chief of the Forces. The post of Adjutant-General is first recorded in 1673 and it was established on a permanent basis in the English Army from 1680. For a time there were two Adjutants-General, one 'for the Foot' and one 'for the Horse' until the two were consolidated into a single appointment 'of the Forces' in 1701. Until the passing of the respective Acts of Union there were Scottish and Irish Adjutants-General; on occasions a separate Adjutant-General would be appointed for deployments overseas; and the Board of Ordnance had an independent Adjutant-General and Deputy for the Royal Artillery and Royal Engineers (respectively) until they were integrated into the British Army in the 1850s.

In the 18th century the Adjutant-General was tasked with issuing orders to the Army, receiving monthly returns from the Regiments, regulation of officers' appointments and leave of absence, and oversight of military reviews, exercises, manoeuvres and matters of discipline. By the early 1800s the Adjutant-General had responsibility for 'all subjects connected with the Discipline, Equipment and Efficiency of the Army'; the AG also took on general responsibility for recruitment at this time. A century later the AG is described as 'a general officer and at the head of his department of the War Office, which is charged with all duties relative to personnel'.

In the 20th century the Adjutant-General was the Second Military Member of the Army Council and its successor the Army Board. Headquarters Adjutant-General was latterly based at the former RAF Upavon, now known as Trenchard Lines, Upavon, Wiltshire. On 1 April 2008 it amalgamated with HQ Land Command to form HQ Land Forces under 'Project Hyperion'.

In December 2009 it was announced that the responsibilities of the Commander Regional Forces (i.e. responsibility for support) would be subsumed within those of the Adjutant-General to the Forces who henceforth would take responsibility for both personnel and support. In 2015 the post was re-designated Commander Personnel and Support Command (renamed Commander Home Command the following year). In evidence to the House of Commons Defence Committee, General Sir Nick Carter, the then Chief of the General Staff explained:

"In my new operating model, I no longer have an Adjutant-General. The reason that I do not have an Adjutant-General is that effectively I am the Adjutant-General. People matter so much to me that I have put that at the heart of my agenda. I am the first CGS ever to have done that." (14 June 2016)

The appointment of a Deputy Adjutant-General is first recorded in 1757, with Assistant Adjutants-General being appointed from 1806.

== List of Adjutants-General to the Forces ==
Holders of the post include:

- 1743–1748 Colonel Charles Ingram
- 1763–1778 Lieutenant-General Edward Harvey
- 1778–1781 Lieutenant-General William Amherst
- 1781–1799 General Sir William Fawcett
- 1799–1820 Lieutenant-General Sir Harry Calvert
- 1820–1828 Major-General Sir Henry Torrens
- 1828–1830 Lieutenant-General Sir Herbert Taylor
- 1830–1850 Lieutenant-General Sir John Macdonald
- 1850–1853 General Sir George Brown
- 1853–1854 General Sir George Cathcart
- 1854–1860 General Sir George Wetherall
- 1860–1865 General Sir James Scarlett
- 1865–1870 General Lord William Paulet
- 1870–1876 General Sir Richard Airey
- 1876–1882 General Sir Charles Ellice
- 1882–1890 General Garnet Wolseley, 1st Viscount Wolseley
- 1882 Lieutenant-General Sir Richard Taylor
- 1890–1897 Lieutenant-General Sir Redvers Buller
- 1897–1901 Lieutenant-General Sir Evelyn Wood
- 1901–1904 Lieutenant-General Sir Thomas Kelly-Kenny
- 1904–1909 Lieutenant-General Sir Charles Douglas
- 1909–1910 Lieutenant-General Sir Ian Hamilton
- 1910–1914 Lieutenant-General Sir Spencer Ewart
- 1914–1916 Lieutenant-General Sir Henry Sclater
- 1916–1918 Lieutenant-General Sir Nevil Macready
- 1918–1922 Lieutenant-General Sir George Macdonogh
- 1922–1923 Lieutenant-General Sir Philip Chetwode
- 1923–1927 Lieutenant-General Sir Robert Whigham
- 1927–1931 General Sir Walter Braithwaite
- 1931–1933 General Sir Archibald Montgomery-Massingberd
- 1933–1935 General Sir Cecil Romer
- 1935–1937 General Sir Harry Knox
- 1937–1939 General Sir Clive Liddell
- 1939–1940 General Sir Robert Gordon-Finlayson
- 1940–1941 Lieutenant-General Colville Wemyss
- 1941–1946 General Sir Ronald Forbes Adam
- 1946–1947 General Sir Richard O'Connor
- 1947–1950 General Sir James Steele
- 1950–1953 General Sir John Crocker
- 1953–1956 General Sir Cameron Nicholson
- 1956–1959 General Sir Charles Loewen
- 1959–1960 General Sir Hugh Stockwell
- 1960–1963 General Sir Richard Goodbody
- 1963–1964 General Sir James Cassels
- 1964–1967 General Sir Reginald Hewetson
- 1967–1970 General Sir Geoffrey Musson
- 1970–1973 General Sir John Mogg
- 1973–1976 General Sir Cecil Blacker
- 1976–1978 General Sir Jack Harman
- 1978–1981 General Sir Robert Ford
- 1981–1984 General Sir George Cooper
- 1984–1986 General Sir Roland Guy
- 1986–1988 General Sir David Mostyn
- 1988–1990 General Sir Robert Pascoe
- 1990–1993 General Sir David Ramsbotham
- 1993–1995 General Sir Michael Wilkes
- 1995–1997 General Sir Michael Rose
- 1997–2000 General Sir Alexander Harley
- 2000–2003 Lieutenant-General Sir Timothy Granville-Chapman
- 2003–2005 Lieutenant-General Sir Alistair Irwin
- 2005–2008 Lieutenant-General Sir Freddie Viggers
- 2008–2009 Lieutenant-General Sir William Rollo
- 2009–2012 Lieutenant-General Sir Mark Mans
- 2012–2015 Lieutenant-General Sir Gerald Berragan

For subsequent equivalent appointments see Commander Home Command.

== Deputy Adjutants-General to the Forces ==
- 1900 to 1902 Major-General Joseph Henry Laye
- 1902 to 1903 Major-General Arthur Wynne

== See also ==
- Adjutant general
- Adjutant General's Corps
