= Francis Richard Maunsell =

Francis Maunsell Diplomat Cartographer

Francis Richard Maunsell (1861–1936) was a diplomat, amateur archaeologist, cartographer, and officer in the British Army, having served in intelligence and concentrated in the Middle East from the late nineteenth century until the early part of the twentieth century.
