= Gerald Berragan =

British general

Lieutenant General Sir Gerald Berragan KBE CB
- Born: 27 February 1958 (age 68)
- Military career
- Allegiance: United Kingdom
- Branch: British Army
- Service years: 1979–2015
- Rank: Lieutenant General
- Commands: 32 Regiment Royal Artillery
- Conflicts: Gulf War; Operation Banner; Kosovo War; Iraq War
- Awards: Knight Commander of the Order of the British Empire; Companion of the Order of the Bath

Lieutenant General Sir Gerald William Berragan, KBE, CB (born 27 February 1958) is a former senior British Army officer who has served as Adjutant-General.

== Career ==
Berragan was commissioned into the Royal Artillery in 1979. He was Chief of Staff of 4th Armoured Brigade during the Gulf War before becoming Commanding Officer of 32 Regiment Royal Artillery in 1997 leading his regiment on operations in Northern Ireland and Kosovo and then becoming Colonel in the Headquarters of the Adjutant-General responsible for individual training policy in 1999. He was appointed Assistant Chief of Staff, Training at Land Command in May 2004 and then saw active service as Deputy Commanding General, Multi-National Corps – Iraq from January to October 2007. He went on to be Director of Recruiting and Training in December 2007, Director-General of Army Personnel in February 2011 and Adjutant-General in August 2012. Berragan retired from the army in 2015, and has been chief executive officer of the Institute for Apprenticeships and Technical Education.

=== Awards and honours ===
Berragan was appointed Knight Commander of the Order of the British Empire (KBE) in the 2015 New Year Honours.

Military offices
Preceded by Simon Mayall	Deputy Commanding General, Multi-National Corps – Iraq; January 2007 – October 2007	Succeeded by Bruce Brealey
Preceded by Andrew Graham	Director of Army Recruiting and Training; 2007–2010	Succeeded by Richard Davis
Preceded by Andrew Gregory	Director of Army Personnel; 2011–2012	Succeeded by Richard Nugee
Preceded by Mark Mans	Adjutant General; 2012–2015	Succeeded by James Bashall
