= Simon Mayall =

British Army general

Lieutenant General Sir Simon Mayall KBE CB
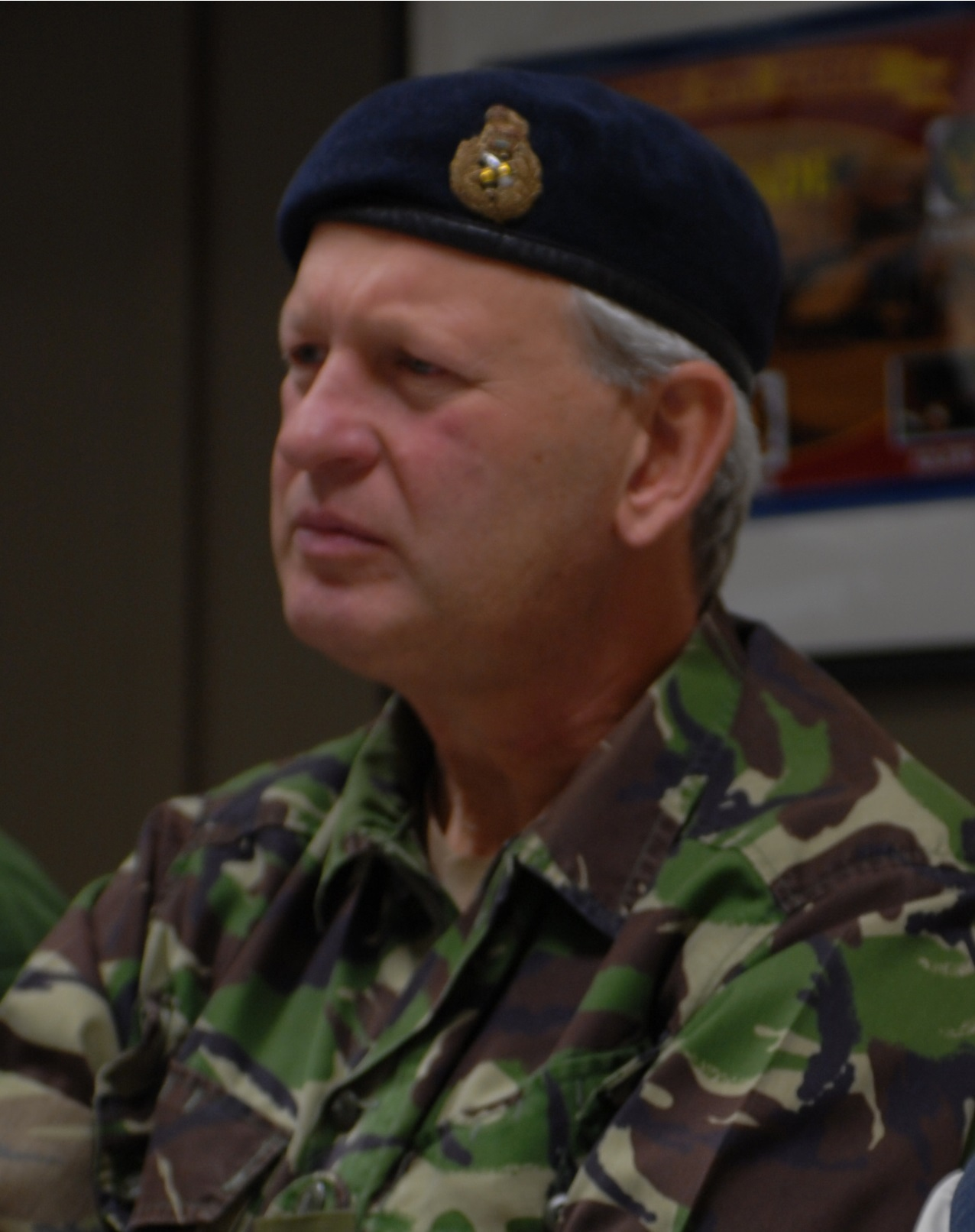
- Simon Mayall in Hohenfels, Germany in 2008
- Born: 7 March 1956 (age 70)
- Military career
- Allegiance: United Kingdom
- Branch: British Army
- Service years: 1979–2015
- Rank: Lieutenant General
- Commands: 1st Mechanised Brigade; 1st The Queen's Dragoon Guards
- Conflicts: Gulf War; Kosovo War; Iraq War; War in Afghanistan
- Awards: Knight Commander of the Order of the British Empire; Companion of the Order of the Bath; Queen's Commendation for Valuable Service; Officer of the Legion of Merit (United States)

Lieutenant General Sir Simon Vincent Mayall, KBE, CB (born 7 March 1956) is a retired British Army officer and a Middle East Adviser at the Ministry of Defence.

== Early life ==
Mayall was educated at St George's College, Weybridge, Balliol College, Oxford (Bachelor of Arts in Modern History, 1979) and King's College London (Master of Arts in International Relations).

== Military career ==
Mayall was commissioned into the 15th/19th The King's Royal Hussars in 1979. From 1985 to 1988 he was seconded to the Sultan of Oman's Land Forces. He was operations officer for the 1st Armoured Division in the Gulf War. After that he completed a Defence Fellowship at St Antony's College, Oxford studying Turkish security policy. He then became commanding officer of 1st The Queen's Dragoon Guards in 1997, in which capacity he was deployed to the British Army Training Unit Suffield and to Northern Ireland.

In 2001 Mayall became commander of 1st Mechanised Brigade, which was subsequently deployed to Kosovo. He received the Queen's Commendation for Valuable Service in recognition of his "distinguished services" on the deployment. Mayall was the deputy commanding general of the Multi-National Corps – Iraq in late 2006 and early 2007, for which he was awarded an Officer of the Legion of Merit by the United States. He was appointed assistant chief of the general staff in January 2007 and, in 2009, became deputy chief of the defence staff (operations). He was appointed a Companion of the Order of the Bath in the 2010 New Year Honours, and made Defence Senior Advisor Middle East at the Ministry of Defence in May 2011. He was replaced in that role by Lieutenant General Tom Beckett in late 2014, having been appointed a Knight Commander of the Order of the British Empire in the 2014 Birthday Honours.

== Post-retirement ==
In 2015, Mayall retired from military service and joined Greenhill & Co., an investment bank, as a senior advisor. On 25 February 2015, he was appointed Lieutenant of the Tower of London. He retired from that post on 20 August 2021.

He was appointed King of Arms of the Order of the British Empire in May 2024, and Squadron Honorary Colonel F (Westminster Dragoons) Squadron, The Royal Yeomanry on 1 December 2024.

Military offices
Preceded by Peter Everson	Deputy Commanding General Multi-National Corps – Iraq; 2006–2007	Succeeded by Gerald Berragan
Preceded by Bill Rollo	Assistant Chief of the General Staff; 2007–2009	Succeeded by James Bucknall
Preceded by Sir Peter Wall	Deputy Chief of the Defence Staff (Operations); 2009–2011	Succeeded by Richard Barrons
Heraldic offices
Preceded by Sir Robert Fulton	King of Arms of the Order of the British Empire; 2024–present	Incumbent
