= Andrew Ridgway =

British Army officer (born 1950)

Lieutenant General Sir Andrew Ridgway KBE CB KStJ DL
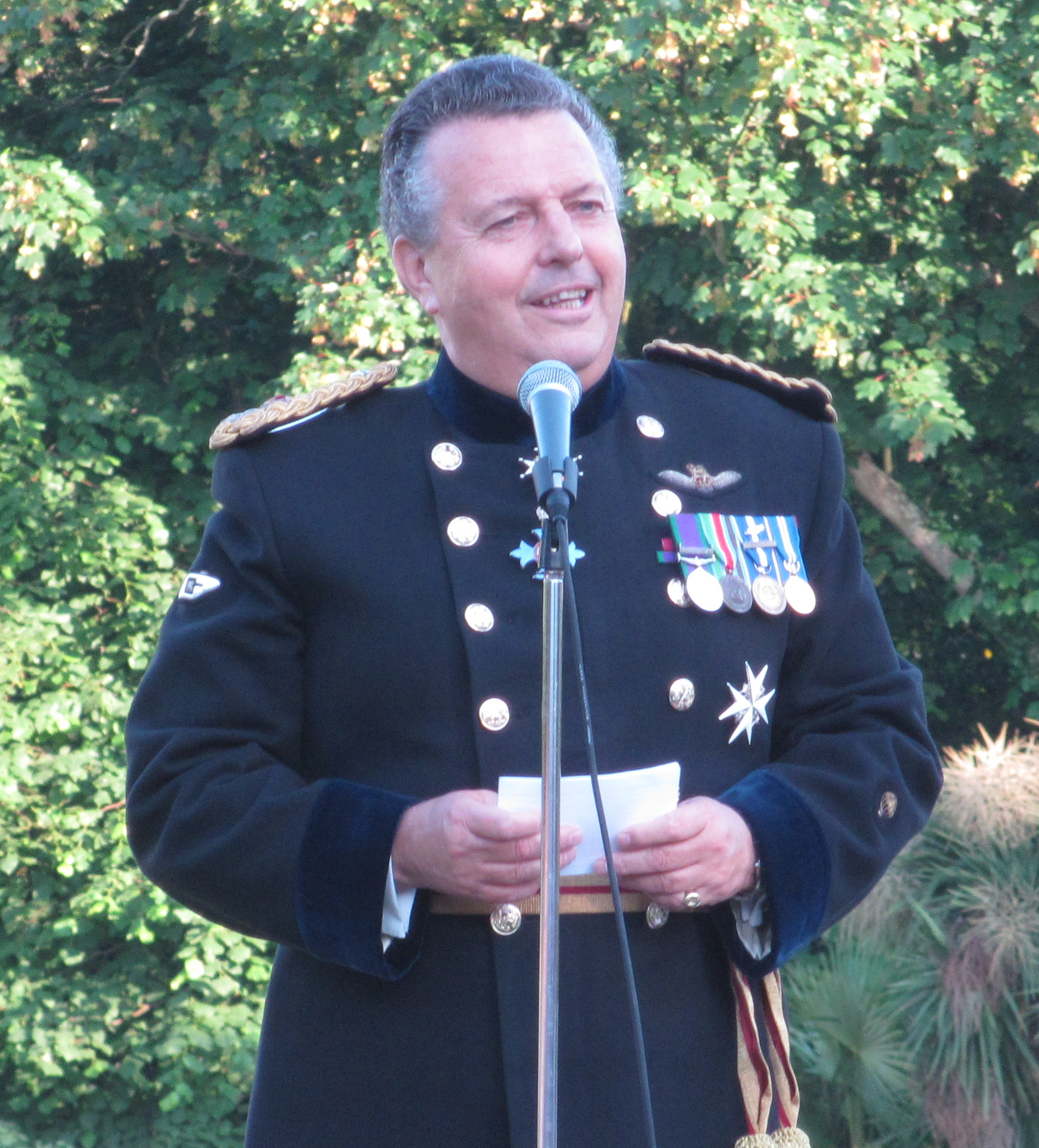
- Ridgway in June 2010
- Born: Andrew Peter Ridgway; 20 March 1950 (age 76); Teddington, Middlesex, UK
- Military career
- Allegiance: United Kingdom
- Branch: British Army
- Rank: Lieutenant General
- Commands: 3rd Royal Tank Regiment; 7th Armoured Brigade
- Conflicts: Bosnian War; Kosovo War
- Awards: Knight Commander of the Order of the British Empire; Companion of the Order of the Bath; Queen's Commendation for Valuable Service

Lieutenant General Sir Andrew Peter Ridgway, KBE, CB, KStJ, DL (born 20 March 1950) is a former British Army officer and Lieutenant Governor of Jersey. He was appointed to the latter role for a 5-year term on 14 June 2006 after a long military career.

== Early life and education ==
Ridgway was born on 20 March 1950. He was educated at Hele's School, Exeter, the Royal Military Academy Sandhurst, and St John's College, Cambridge.

== Military career ==
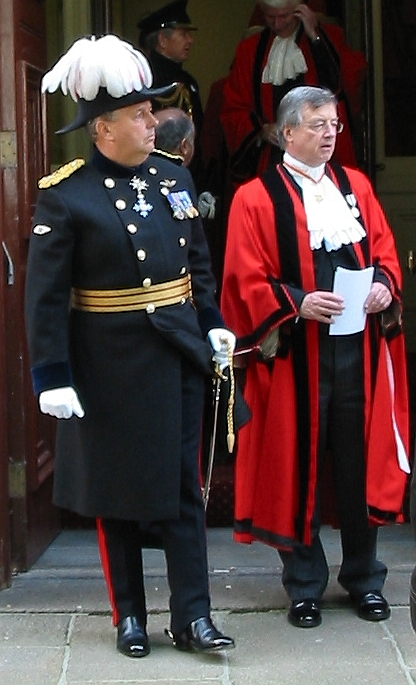
Lt Gen. Sir Andrew Ridgway (left) fulfilling duties as Lieutenant Governor of Jersey, alongside Sir Philip Bailhache, Bailiff of Jersey (right), at Liberation Day celebrations, 9 May 2008

In 1970, Ridgway was commissioned into the 3rd Royal Tank Regiment, serving in Germany and Ireland as a Troop Leader. In 1975, he qualified as a helicopter pilot, and was given command of the 1st Royal Tank Regiment Air Squadron, operating in Central America and Northern Ireland. In 1982, he attended the Army Staff College at Camberley, before taking command of the 3rd Royal Tank Regiment in 1991 and the 7th Armoured Brigade (the 'Desert Rats') in 1993. In 1994, he was appointed UN Commander in Central Bosnia and Herzegovina, and became Chief of Staff for the Allied Rapid Reaction Corps for NATO's entry into the Kosovo War in 1999. For 2003 to 2006, he was Chief of Defence Intelligence, although he was not directly involved in producing the controversial intelligence reports that led to 2003 invasion of Iraq and Operation Telic. He is also Colonel of the Royal Tank Regiment (appointed in 1999), Honorary Colonel of Cambridge University Officer Training Corps and the Westminster Dragoons.

Other jobs in Ridgway's career have included running the Army budget as Colonel Army Programmes and posts as First Director of Operational Capability, First Director of Training and Education and Chief of Joint Force Operations.

== Lieutenant-Governor of Jersey ==
From 2006 until 2011, Ridgway was Lieutenant-Governor of Jersey, in the Channel Islands, where he acted as the Queen's representative. Though largely a symbolic and ceremonial appointment, the post of Lieutenant-Governor is the essential link between Jersey and the Crown, as the Channel Islands are not part of the United Kingdom.

== Honours and decorations ==
Ridgway was appointed a Commander of the Order of the British Empire (CBE) in 1995 and a Companion of the Order of the Bath (CB) in 2001, as well as receiving the Queen's Commendation for Valuable Service and the US Defense Intelligence Agency Award in 2005.

Ridgway was advanced to Knight Commander of the Order of the British Empire (KBE) in the 2011 Birthday Honours.

Military offices
Preceded by Sir Joe French	Chief of Defence Intelligence; 2003–2006	Succeeded by Sir Stuart Peach
Government offices
Preceded by Sir John Cheshire	Lieutenant Governor of Jersey; 2006–2011	Succeeded by Sir John McColl
