= Nick Parker =

British Army general from 1973 to 2013

General Sir Nick Parker KCB CBE DL
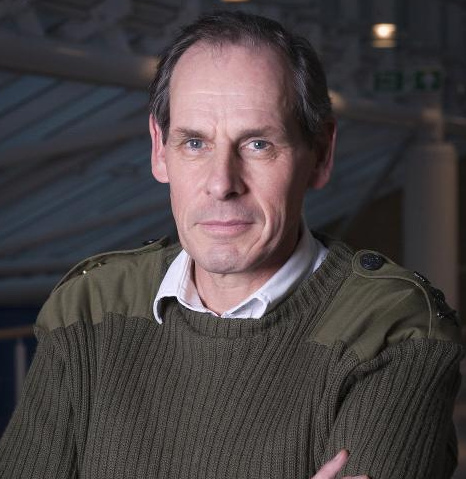
- Parker in 2013
- Born: 13 October 1954 (age 72)
- Military career
- Allegiance: United Kingdom
- Branch: British Army
- Service years: 1973–2013
- Rank: General
- Commands: Land Forces; International Security Assistance Force; UK Contingent, Afghanistan; Regional Forces (UK); HQ Northern Ireland; 2nd Infantry Division; 20th Armoured Brigade; 2nd Battalion Royal Green Jackets
- Conflicts / operations: Sierra Leone Civil War; Iraq War; The Troubles; Operation Banner; War in Afghanistan
- Awards: Knight Commander of the Order of the Bath; Commander of the Order of the British Empire; Mentioned in Despatches; Officer of the Legion of Merit (U.S.); NATO Meritorious Service Medal

General Sir Nicholas Ralph Parker, KCB, CBE, DL (born 13 October 1954) is a former British Army officer who served as Commander Land Forces (formerly Commander-in-Chief, Land Forces) until December 2012.

As a general officer, Parker served in Northern Ireland as well as in Sierra Leone, Iraq and Afghanistan and in staff roles including governor of Edinburgh Castle, commandant of the Joint Services Command and Staff College and Commander of Regional Forces, a role that also gave him the duties of inspector-general of the Territorial Army. Between 2005 and 2006, Parker served as deputy commanding general of Multi-National Force – Iraq, before appointment to General Officer Commanding, Northern Ireland, in which role he had the responsibility of overseeing the withdrawal of troops from the streets of Northern Ireland for the first time in over thirty years.

While on holiday in 2009, Parker and his wife received news that their son, Harry, a captain with The Rifles, had been seriously wounded in Afghanistan. Harry lost both legs as a result of a roadside bomb attack while leading his patrol. Parker later gave interviews about the ordeal the family went through with Harry's injuries, calling the experience "foul". Later the same year, Parker himself deployed to Afghanistan on a twelve-month tour, becoming the commander of the British forces in the country and deputy commander of the International Security Assistance Force (ISAF), second in command to American General Stanley A. McChrystal. In June 2010, McChrystal was relieved of his command of ISAF by President Barack Obama, leaving Parker as acting commander of ISAF for just over a week until General David Petraeus was confirmed as the new commander.

== Early and personal life ==
Born the son of Captain Herbert Blake Parker and Diana Katherine Barnwell, Parker was educated at the independent Sherborne School and the Royal Military Academy Sandhurst. Parker has listed Coronation Street and fishing among his interests.

== Military career ==
=== Early commands and promotions ===
Parker was commissioned into the Royal Green Jackets as a second lieutenant in January 1974. He was promoted to full lieutenant in November 1975, was Mentioned in Despatches in January 1980 for service in Northern Ireland the previous year, and promoted captain in May 1980. He attended the Army Staff Course in 1986 prior to promotion to major in October the same year.

Promoted to lieutenant colonel in 1991, he was subsequently appointed commanding officer of the Second Battalion the Royal Green Jackets from 1994 to 1995 before promotion to colonel in 1996, having attended the Higher Command and Staff Course at the Staff College, Camberley. Parker was promoted to brigadier in December 1997, with seniority from 30 June 1997 and given command of 20th Armoured Brigade, which deployed to Bosnia in 1999.

=== High command ===
Parker served as commander of the British task force in Sierra Leone and advisor to the country's president in 2001, and went on to become General Officer Commanding, 2nd Division in November 2002, being promoted to major-general on the same date. As General Officer Commanding 2nd Division, he was also Governor of Edinburgh Castle.

In 2004 he served as commandant of the Joint Services Command and Staff College, before taking over as deputy commanding general of the Multi-National Corps – Iraq, holding the position from August 2005 to February 2006.

Parker was appointed General Officer Commanding Northern Ireland and promoted to the rank of lieutenant-general on 18 July 2006. In Northern Ireland he was responsible for reducing the UK's troop commitment in the Province and is quoted as saying "that the military had made a significant contribution to security in Northern Ireland that has allowed other people to make the difference through politics, social programmes and economics". Parker oversaw the closure of the base at Bessbrook, County Armagh, which, he said, "signifies a time when the army stops being part of the security forces and moves into being part of the community."

Parker was awarded the American Legion of Merit "in recognition of gallant and distinguished services during coalition operations in Afghanistan" in 2007. In October 2007, he became Commander of Regional Forces at Land Command, a dual-hatted role as Inspector-General of the Territorial Army in which role he advocated for the TA and the regular Army to be regarded as a single organisation, pointing out that both face identical risks on deployment and saying "the TA soldier brings maturity and a wider understanding of the world – the end result, more so now than ever before, is the one Army and everyone should feel part of the same team". As Commander, Regional Forces, Parker was responsible for overseeing the £3 billion overhaul of the Army's Royal Engineers' Royal School of Military Engineering in a public-private partnership in September 2008 as well as accepting the Freedom of the City of Bath on behalf of the Rifles in October 2008, and campaigning for the creation of an Armed Forces Day for the UK, a proposal that was implemented in July 2009.

=== ISAF ===
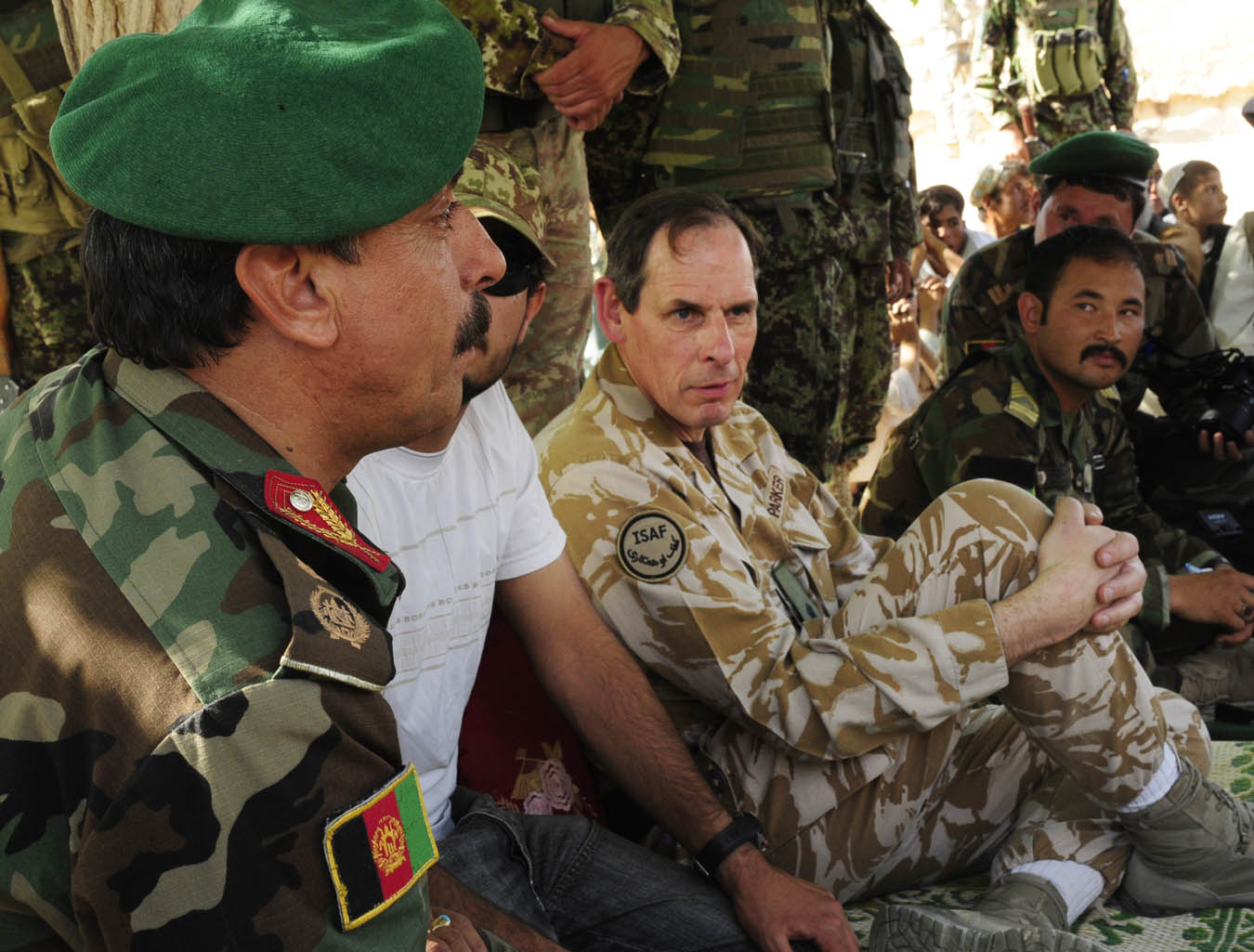
Parker attending a shura in April 2010 with Afghan National Army Brigadier General Akram Sameh

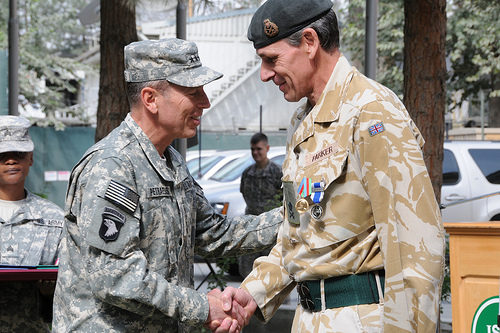
General David Petraeus presents Parker with the NATO Meritorious Service Medal

In September 2009, it was announced that Parker would succeed Royal Marine Lieutenant General Sir Jim Dutton as deputy commander of ISAF in Afghanistan. Parker was serving in Afghanistan on Christmas Day 2009 and undertook a tour of British bases in the area to visit troops.

On 23 June 2010, Parker assumed temporary command of all 140,000 NATO troops in Afghanistan, following the departure of American General Stanley McChrystal. British Prime Minister David Cameron told U.S. President Barack Obama that Parker had assured him that the operation would "not miss a beat" during the transition period. He held the role until 3 July, when General David Petraeus was confirmed as McChrystal's replacement.

=== General ===
On 29 July 2010 Parker was named as the next Commander-in-Chief, Land Forces in succession to General Sir Peter Wall.

Parker took over as Commander-in-Chief Land Forces on 1 October 2010 and was granted the substantive rank of general. For his service in Afghanistan, Parker was presented with the NATO Meritorious Service Medal by the overall allied commander in Afghanistan, US General David Petraeus. Parker also received the Afghan President's Award from its Minister of Defence.

Under a major army command reorganisation effective 1 November 2011 Parker's role was re-designated Commander Land Forces.

Parker's post as Commander Land Forces was assumed by Lieutenant General Adrian Bradshaw in January 2013.

As of 2010, Parker was Honorary Colonel of the Manchester and Salford Universities Officers' Training Corps and served as Colonel Commandant of 1st Battalion The Royal Green Jackets. When the Royal Green Jackets were merged with others in 2007 to form The Rifles, he became Colonel Commandant of the new regiment until replaced in 2013 by Lt-General Nick Carter.

From 2008 Parker was the President of the Peninsular War 200, the official UK organisation for the commemoration of the Peninsular War (1808–1814).

Parker was appointed Commander of the Order of the British Empire in 2001 and appointed Knight Commander of the Order of the Bath in the 2009 Birthday Honours.

In 2024, Parker was appointed Deputy Lieutenant of Wiltshire.

== ACPO review ==
In 2013, an independent review of the Association of Chief Police Officers (ACPO) by Parker was published. It recommended that ACPO be replaced by a new body. On the basis of the review, the National Police Chiefs' Council (NPCC) replaced ACPO on 1 April 2015.

== Family ==
In 1979 he married Rebecca Clare Wellings: they have two sons, one of whom, Harry, was seriously injured in July 2009 while serving as a captain with 4th Battalion The Rifles in Afghanistan. Harry lost both legs after the patrol he was commanding ran over a roadside bomb. Parker later spoke about the aftermath of the incident, saying "it was pretty bad at that stage, they didn't know if Harry would survive or not. It helped being a soldier because all your training is about remaining as calm and calculating as you can in very difficult circumstances. But it was foul."

Military offices
Preceded by Robert Gordon	General Officer Commanding the 2nd Division; 2002–2004	Succeeded by Euan Loudon
Preceded by John McColl	Commandant of the Joint Services Command and Staff College; 2004–2005	Succeeded by Nigel Maddox
Preceded by Mark Mans	Deputy Commanding General Multi-National Corps – Iraq; 2005–2006	Succeeded by Peter Everson
Preceded by Sir Redmond Watt	General Officer Commanding the British Army in Northern Ireland; 2006–2007	Succeeded by Chris Brown
Preceded by Sir John McColl	Commander Regional Forces; 2007–2009	Succeeded by Mark Mans
Preceded by Sir James Dutton	Deputy Commander, ISAF; 2009–2010	Succeeded by James Bucknall
Preceded by Sir Peter Wall	Commander-in-Chief, Land Forces; 2010–2011	Post restructured
New office	Commander Land Forces; 2011–2012	Succeeded by Adrian Bradshaw
