= Commander Regional Forces (United Kingdom) =

The Commander Regional Forces (CRF) was a senior British Army officer who had command over the Regenerative Divisions of the British Army i.e. those divisions that are not on full strength and would only be mobilised in a national emergency. The post was held by a lieutenant general and was based at HQ Land Forces. The post holder was also Inspector-General of the Territorial Army.

== Structure ==
Regional Forces was established in 2003, under the LANDmark reorganisation. The Commander Regional Forces was responsible for three regenerative Divisions (2nd Division, 4th Division and 5th Division), London District, and United Kingdom Support Command (Germany).

In December 2009 it was announced that the responsibilities of the Commander Regional Forces (i.e. responsibility for support) would be subsumed within those of the Adjutant-General to the Forces who henceforth would take responsibility for both personnel and support.

== Recent Commanders ==
Recent Commanders of Regional Forces have been:

- 2002-2004 Lieutenant General John Kiszely
- 2004-2007 Lieutenant General John McColl
- 2007-2009 Lieutenant General Nick Parker
- September 2009 - December 2009 Lieutenant General Mark Mans

See also General Officer Commanding Support Command, renamed Regional Command in 2015.
