= Mark Mans =

British Army general

Lieutenant General Sir Mark Mans KCB CBE DL
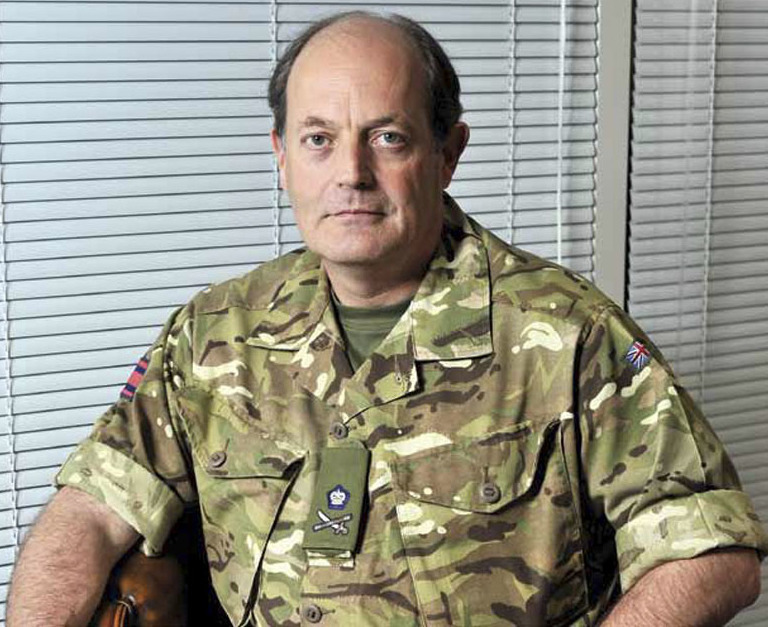
- Lieutenant General Mans in 2012
- Born: 1955 (age 70–71)
- Military career
- Allegiance: United Kingdom
- Branch: British Army
- Service years: 1974–2018
- Rank: Lieutenant General
- Commands: Personnel & Support Command; Regional Forces; 21 Engineer Regiment; 37 Field Squadron
- Conflicts: The Troubles; Gulf War; Bosnian War; Iraq War
- Awards: Knight Commander of the Order of the Bath; Commander of the Order of the British Empire; Queen's Commendation for Valuable Service; Legion of Merit (United States)

Lieutenant General Sir Mark Francis Noel Mans, KCB, CBE, DL (born 1955) is a senior British Army officer, who served as Adjutant-General to the Forces of the United Kingdom from 2009 to 2012.

== Military career ==
Educated at Berkhamsted School, Mans was commissioned into the Royal Engineers in 1974. In 1991 during the Gulf War he was Officer Commanding 37 Field Squadron. Later in 1995 he deployed to Bosnia in command of 21 Engineer Regiment. In February 2005 he became Deputy Commanding General of the Multi-National Force – Iraq.

Mans served as Deputy Adjutant General, taking up that appointment in 2006, before becoming Military Secretary in March 2008. In September 2009 he was appointed Commander Regional Forces at Land Command. Then in December 2009 he was made Adjutant-General to the Forces with responsibility for both personnel and support. Mans served as the Chief Royal Engineer from 2013 to 2018.

Mans was awarded the Queen's Commendation for Valuable Service in 1996, appointed a Commander of the Order of the British Empire in the 2005 Birthday Honours, and awarded the American Legion of Merit in December 2006. He was appointed a Knight Commander of the Order of the Bath in the 2012 New Year Honours. He was appointed a Deputy Lieutenant of Hampshire in October 2012.

Military offices
Preceded by Andrew Farquhar	Deputy Commanding General Multi-National Corps – Iraq; February – August 2005	Succeeded by Nick Parker
Preceded by Nicholas Cottam	Military Secretary; 2008–2009	Succeeded by David Rutherford-Jones
Preceded by Sir Nick Parker	Commander Regional Forces; September – December 2009	Post abolished
Preceded by Bill Rollo	Adjutant General; 2009–2012	Succeeded by Gerald Berragan
Honorary titles
Preceded by Sir Peter Wall	Chief Royal Engineer; 2013–2018	Succeeded by Tyrone Urch
