= John McColl (British Army officer) =

General Sir John McColl KCB CBE DSO KStJ
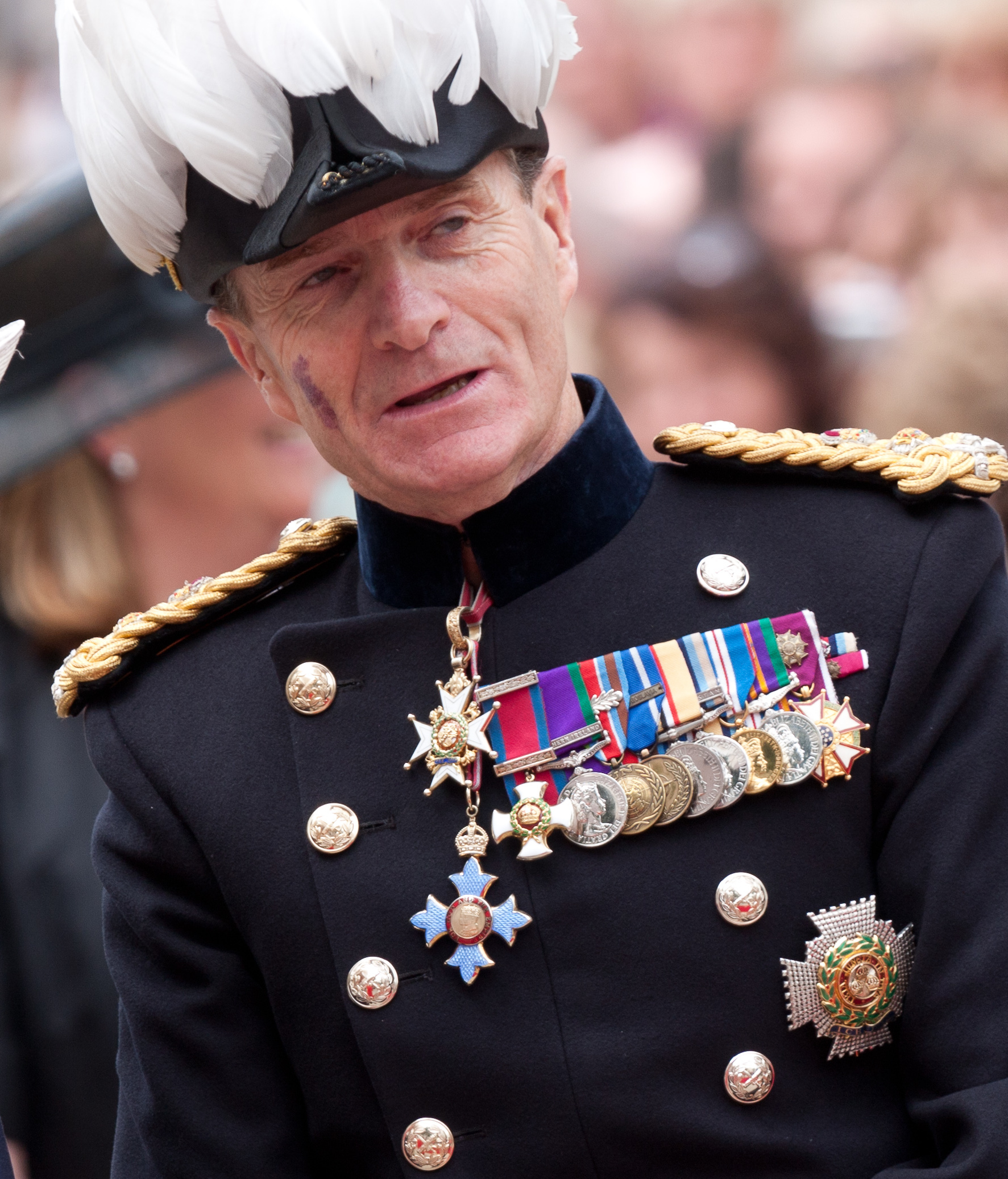
- McColl in 2012

Lieutenant Governor of Jersey
- In office 26 September 2011 – 30 November 2016
- Premier: Ian Gorst
- Preceded by: Sir Andrew Ridgway
- Succeeded by: Sir Stephen Dalton

Personal details
- Born: John Chalmers McColl; 17 April 1952 (age 74) London, England

Military service
- Allegiance: United Kingdom
- Branch/service: British Army
- Years of service: 1973–2011
- Rank: General
- Commands: Deputy Supreme Allied Commander Europe (2007–2011); Regional Forces (2004–2007); Joint Services Command and Staff College (2003–2004); 3rd Mechanised Division (2000–2003); International Security Assistance Force (2001–2002); 1st Mechanised Brigade (1997–1999)
- Battles/wars: The Troubles; Sierra Leone Civil War; Kosovo War; Bosnian War; Iraq War; War in Afghanistan
- Awards: Knight Commander of the Order of the Bath; Commander of the Order of the British Empire; Distinguished Service Order; Knight of the Order of St John; Mentioned in Despatches; Officer of the Legion of Merit (United States)

General Sir John Chalmers McColl, KCB, CBE, DSO, KStJ (born 17 April 1952) is a retired senior British Army officer and a past Lieutenant Governor of Jersey. McColl previously served as Deputy Supreme Allied Commander Europe from 2007 to 2011.

== Army career ==
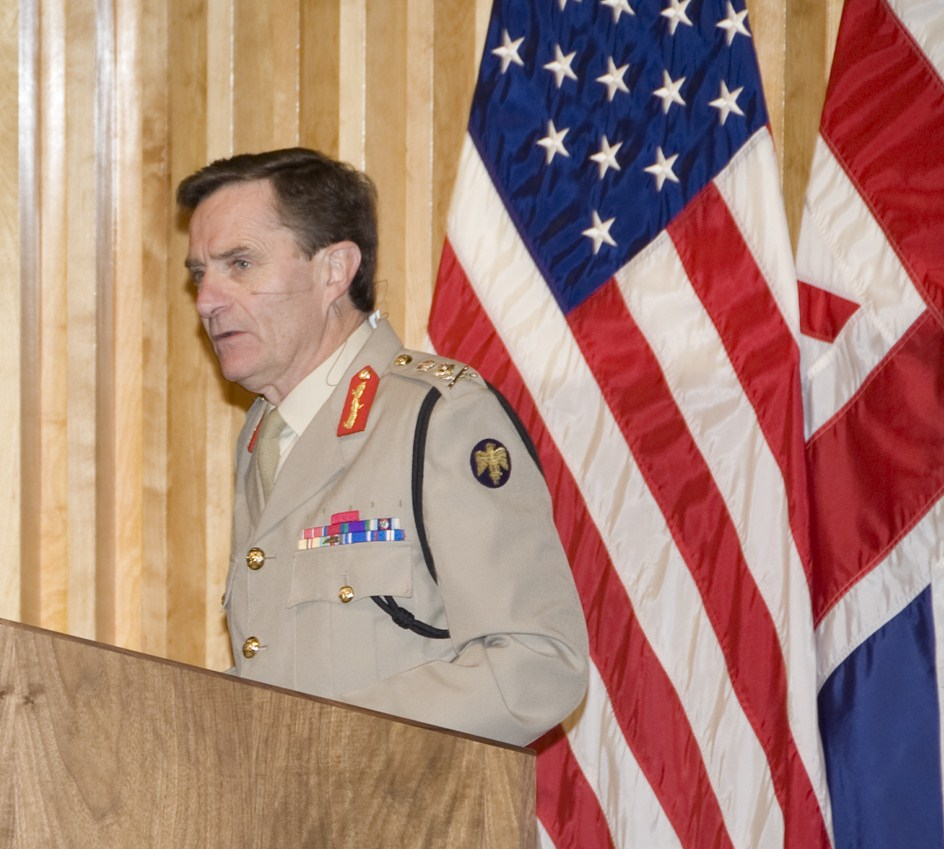
McColl as DSACEUR

Educated at Culford School in Suffolk, England, McColl was commissioned as a second lieutenant in the Royal Anglian Regiment in 1973 and promoted to lieutenant on 8 September 1974. He was promoted to captain on 8 March 1979 and to major on 30 September 1984. In 1989, he became a squadron commander in the 3rd Royal Tank Regiment, was promoted to lieutenant colonel on 30 June 1990, and to acting colonel shortly after. He was promoted to colonel on 30 June 1995 and to brigadier on 31 December 1996 (seniority 30 June). He held a variety of commands and military posts before commanding 1st Mechanised Brigade in 1997. In 1999, he became Assistant Chief of Staff at Land Command and in 2000, he was given command of 3rd (UK) Mechanised Division. In 2001, he was appointed the first leader of the International Security Assistance Force in Afghanistan.

In 2003, he became Commandant of the Joint Services Command and Staff College. He was deployed as Senior British Military Representative and Deputy Commanding General, Multinational Force, Iraq in March 2004 and at the end of that year he became Commander of Regional Forces at Land Command. He became Deputy Supreme Allied Commander Europe (DSACEUR) in the rank of general in October 2007, and was appointed Knight Commander of the Order of the Bath (KCB) in the 2008 New Year Honours.

McColl was the preferred choice of Afghanistan for the role of UN Special Envoy after Paddy Ashdown withdrew. However, on 7 March 2008, Norwegian diplomat Kai Eide was appointed as the UN Special Representative for Afghanistan. McColl retired as DSACEUR in March 2011.

== Lieutenant Governor of Jersey ==
On 26 October 2010 it was announced that he would be appointed to the role of Lieutenant Governor of Jersey. He took office on 26 September 2011. On 5 June 2012, Sir John, and his wife Lady McColl, represented Jersey at the Queen's Diamond Jubilee Dedication Service at St Paul's Cathedral. After his fixed term of office, his tenure ended on 30 November 2016 and he was succeeded by Air Chief Marshal Sir Stephen Dalton.

== Later life ==
He was Honorary Colonel Wiltshire Army Cadet Force until late 2024.

== Honours and awards ==
Knight Commander of the Order of the Bath (KCB)	29 December 2007
Commander of the Order of the British Empire (CBE)	13 May 1997
Companion of the Distinguished Service Order (DSO)	29 October 2002
Knight of the Order of St John (KStJ)	5 August 2016
Legion of Merit (Officer)	22 May 2007

Military offices
New post	Commander of the International Security Assistance Force; 2001–2002	Succeeded by Hilmi Akin Zorlu
Preceded by Richard Dannatt	General Officer Commanding the 3rd Mechanised Division; 2000–2003	Succeeded by Graeme Lamb
Preceded by John Lippiett	Commandant of the Joint Services Command and Staff College; 2003–2004	Succeeded by Nick Parker
Preceded by Andrew Figgures	Senior British Military Representative and Deputy Commanding General, Multinational Force, Iraq; March–October 2004	Succeeded by John Kiszely
Preceded by John Kiszely	Commander Regional Forces; 2004–2007	Succeeded by Nick Parker
Preceded by John Reith	Deputy Supreme Allied Commander Europe; 2007–2011	Succeeded by Richard Shirreff
Government offices
Preceded by Sir Andrew Ridgway	Lieutenant Governor of Jersey; 2011–2016	Succeeded by Sir Stephen Dalton
