= King of Arms of the Order of the British Empire =

Herald of the Order of the British Empire

The King of Arms of the Order of the British Empire is the herald of the Order of the British Empire, established in 1917 and effective since 1918.

== Kings of Arms ==
Name	Dates	Ref.
General the Rt. Hon. Sir Arthur Paget, GCB, GCVO	1918–1928	
Admiral Sir Herbert Heath, KCB, MVO	1929–1947	
Air Marshal Sir Charles Carr, KBE, CB, DFC, AFC	1947–1968	
Lieutenant General Sir George Gordon-Lennox, KBE, CB, CVO, DSO	1968–1983	
Admiral Sir Anthony Morton, GBE, KCB	1983–1997	
Air Chief Marshal Sir Patrick Hine, GCB, GBE	1997–2011	
Admiral Sir Peter Abbott, GBE, KCB	2011–2015	
Lieutenant General Sir Robert Fulton, KBE	2016–2024	
Lieutenant General Sir Simon Mayall, KBE, CB	2024–present	
