= James Bucknall =

British Army general (born 1958)

Lieutenant General Sir James Bucknall KCB CBE
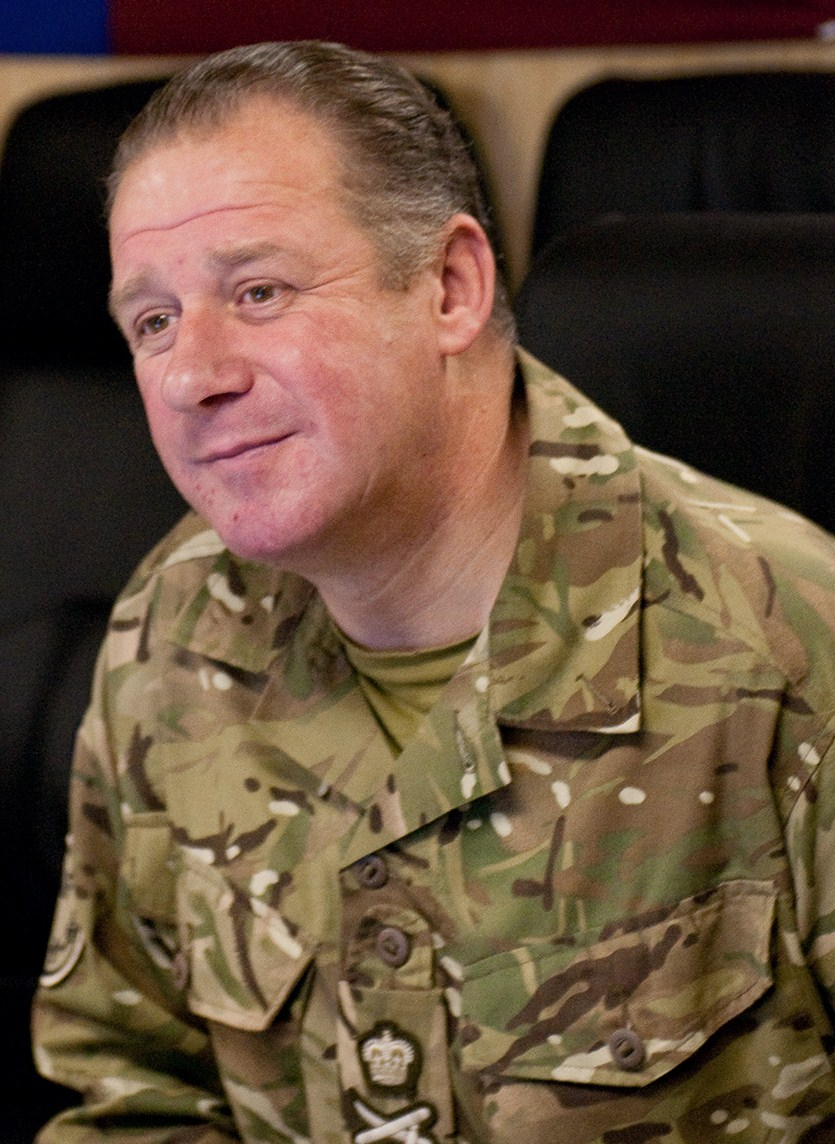
- Bucknall in Afghanistan in 2010
- Born: 29 November 1958 (age 67)
- Military career
- Allegiance: United Kingdom
- Branch: British Army
- Service years: 1977–2013
- Rank: Lieutenant General
- Service number: 505211
- Unit: Coldstream Guards
- Commands: Allied Rapid Reaction Corps; Deputy Commander, International Security Assistance Force; 39th Infantry Brigade; 1st Battalion, Coldstream Guards
- Conflicts: Bosnian War; The Troubles; Iraq War; War in Afghanistan
- Awards: Knight Commander of the Order of the Bath; Commander of the Order of the British Empire; Mentioned in Dispatches; Officer of the Legion of Merit (United States)

Lieutenant General Sir James Jeffrey Corfield Bucknall, KCB, CBE (born 29 November 1958) is a retired British Army officer and former Commander of the Allied Rapid Reaction Corps.

== Early life ==
Bucknall was born in 1958 and was educated at Winchester College, a boys' public school in Winchester, Hampshire.

== Military career ==
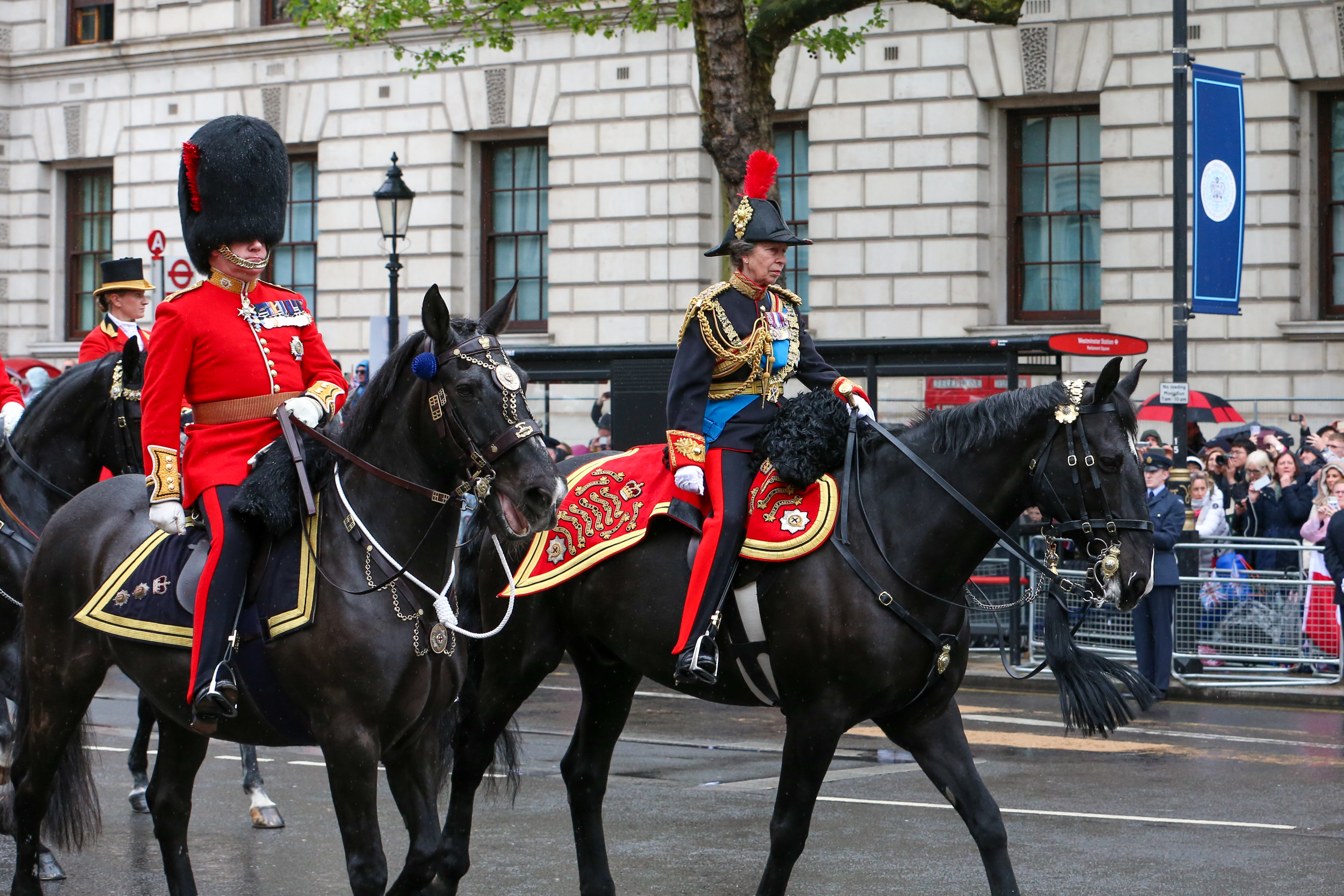
Bucknall (left) riding alongside Anne, Princess Royal, during the Coronation Procession at the Coronation of Charles III in 2023

In April 1977, Bucknall joined the British Army as a guardsman. In September 1977, he entered the Royal Military Academy Sandhurst. He graduated the following year and was commissioned into Her Majesty's Coldstream Regiment of Foot Guards as a second lieutenant on a short service commission on 8 April 1978. His first promotion was to lieutenant in April 1980. He transferred from a short service commission to a regular commission in 1983, retaining seniority in his rank, before promotion to captain in October 1984.

After attending the Staff College, Camberley, Bucknall attained field officer status with promotion to major in September 1990. He took up a company command, after which he served in a staff post at HQ Northern Ireland, and was Mentioned in Despatches in recognition of his services in the province. He was promoted to lieutenant colonel in 1995, prior to assuming command of 1st Battalion, Coldstream Guards in Germany. In 1998, he was appointed chief of staff of 1st Armoured Division, and deployed to Bosnia to join the division.

Bucknall was promoted to colonel in 1999 and, after completing the Higher Command and Staff Course, to brigadier on 31 December 2001, with seniority from 30 June. Bucknall returned to Northern Ireland in 2003, taking command of 39th Infantry Brigade, with responsibility for Belfast and the surrounding area during The Troubles. After Northern Ireland, Bucknall was assigned to the Ministry of Defence in London as Director Counter-Terrorism and UK Operations, after which he served in a staff position in Baghdad with responsibility for strategic planning, for which he was later awarded the American Legion of Merit.

=== High command ===
Bucknall attained general officer status with promotion to major general on 18 September 2006, whereupon he was appointed Chief of Staff of NATO's Allied Rapid Reaction Corps and initially deployed to Afghanistan to join, becoming chief of staff to ISAF IX, led by the ARRC. From 2009 to 2010, Bucknall served as an Assistant Chief of the General Staff.

Bucknall was promoted to lieutenant general on 31 August 2010. He was appointed Deputy Commander of the International Security Assistance Force—second in command of 130,000 troops from 48 countries—and United Kingdom National Contingent Commander, Kabul—overall commander of all British forces in Afghanistan—succeeding General Sir Nick Parker. While in Afghanistan, Bucknall emphasised that a continued effort was required to maintain the momentum in improving the security situation in the country, saying "progress is not irreversible, we are yet to make it so. But we are certainly on the right track". In February 2011 he became Commander of the Allied Rapid Reaction Corps.

Bucknall retired from the British Army on 23 November 2013.

== Personal life ==
Bucknall lists his interests as history, field sports, cricket and association football, supporting Newcastle United F.C.

== Honours and decorations ==
In 2009, Bucknall was awarded the Legion of Merit in the degree of Officer by the United States "in recognition of gallant and distinguished services during coalition operations". He was granted unrestricted permission to wear the decoration on his uniform. He was awarded the Queen's Commendation for Valuable Service "in recognition of gallant and distinguished services in Afghanistan during the period 1 April 2011 to 30 September 2011".

Bucknall was appointed Member of the Order of the British Empire (MBE) "in recognition of gallant and distinguished services in Northern Ireland in the period 1 April to 30 September 1994". He was promoted to Commander of the Order of the British Empire (CBE) "in recognition of gallant and distinguished services in Northern Ireland in the period 1 April to 30 September 2003". He was knighted as a Knight Commander of the Order of the Bath (KCB) in the 2013 New Year Honours.

Bucknall was appointed Colonel of the Coldstream Guards in October 2009, in succession to Sir Michael Rose.

Military offices
| Preceded by Simon Mayall | Assistant Chief of the General Staff; 2009–2010 | Succeeded by Richard Barrons |
| Preceded by Sir Nick Parker | Deputy Commander, ISAF; 2010–2011 | Succeeded by Adrian Bradshaw |
| Preceded by Sir Richard Shirreff | Commander Allied Rapid Reaction Corps; 2011–2013 | Succeeded by Timothy Evans |
