= Peter Wall (British Army officer) =

British Army general

General Sir Peter Wall GCB CBE DL
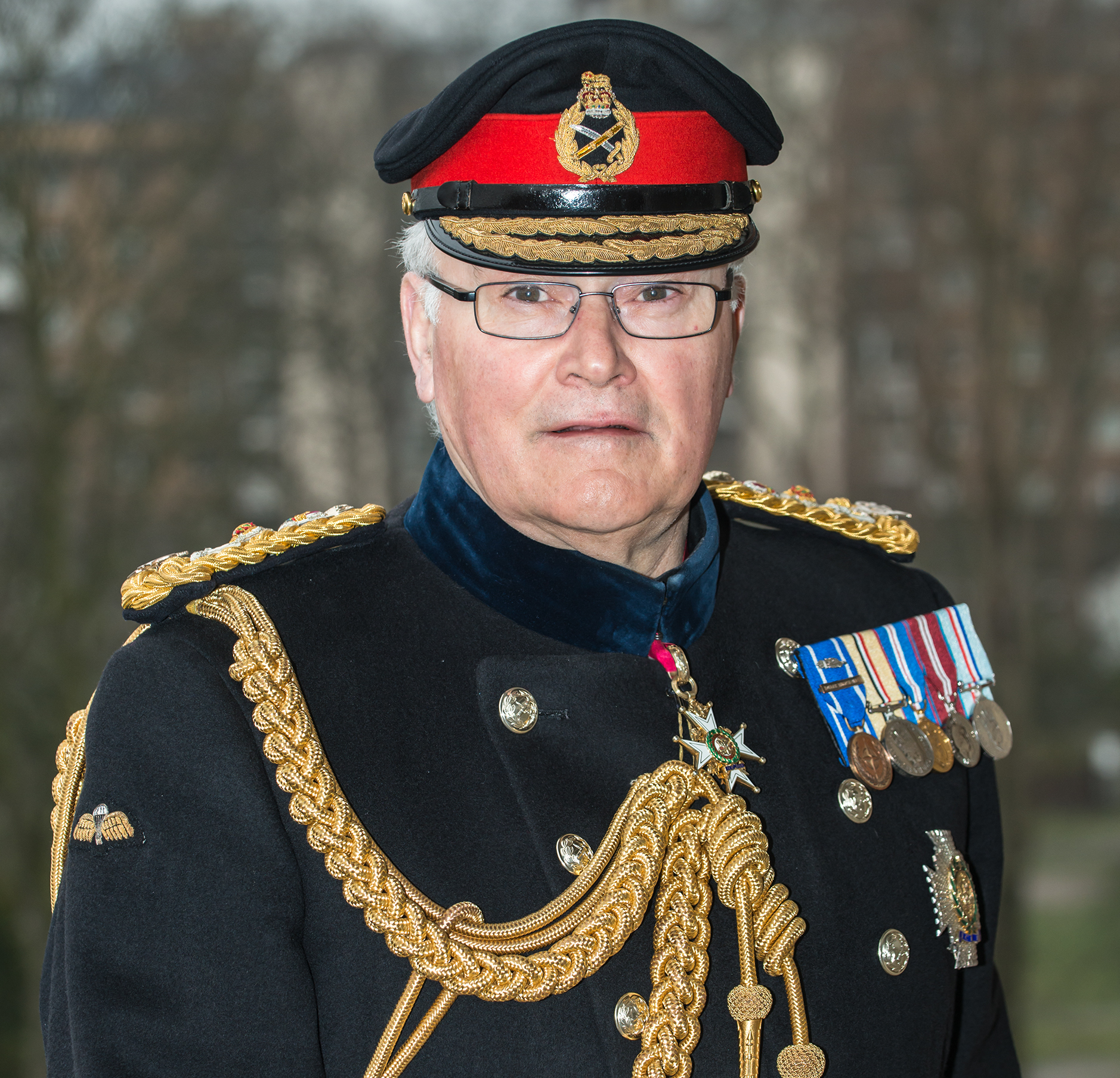
- General Sir Peter Wall in 2013
- Born: 10 July 1955 (age 71); Ipswich, Suffolk, England
- Spouse: Fiona Simpson (m. 1980)
- Military career
- Allegiance: United Kingdom
- Branch: British Army
- Service years: 1974–2014
- Rank: General
- Service number: 497536
- Unit: Royal Engineers
- Commands: Chief of the General Staff (2010–14); Land Forces (2009–10); Chief Royal Engineer (2009); 1st (UK) Armoured Division (2003–05); 16 Air Assault Brigade (1999–00); 32 Engineer Regiment (1994–96); 9 Parachute Squadron RE (1990–92)
- Conflicts: Yugoslav Wars; Iraq War
- Awards: Knight Grand Cross of the Order of the Bath; Commander of the Order of the British Empire; Queen's Commendation for Valuable Service

General Sir Peter Anthony Wall, GCB, CBE, DL (born 10 July 1955) is a retired British Army officer who served as the Chief of the General Staff, the professional head of the British Army, until September 2014. Wall had previously been the Commander-in-Chief, Land Forces from August 2009 to September 2010. He succeeded General Sir David Richards as Chief of the General Staff in September 2010, the latter going on a month later to be Chief of the Defence Staff.

== Early life and education ==
Wall was born in Ipswich, Suffolk, to Dorothy Margaret (née Waltho) and John Ramsay Wall. He was educated at Whitgift School, an independent school in London. He studied at Selwyn College, Cambridge, graduating with a Bachelor of Arts (BA) degree in 1978; as per tradition, his BA was promoted to a Master of Arts (MA Cantab) degree in 1980.

== Military career ==
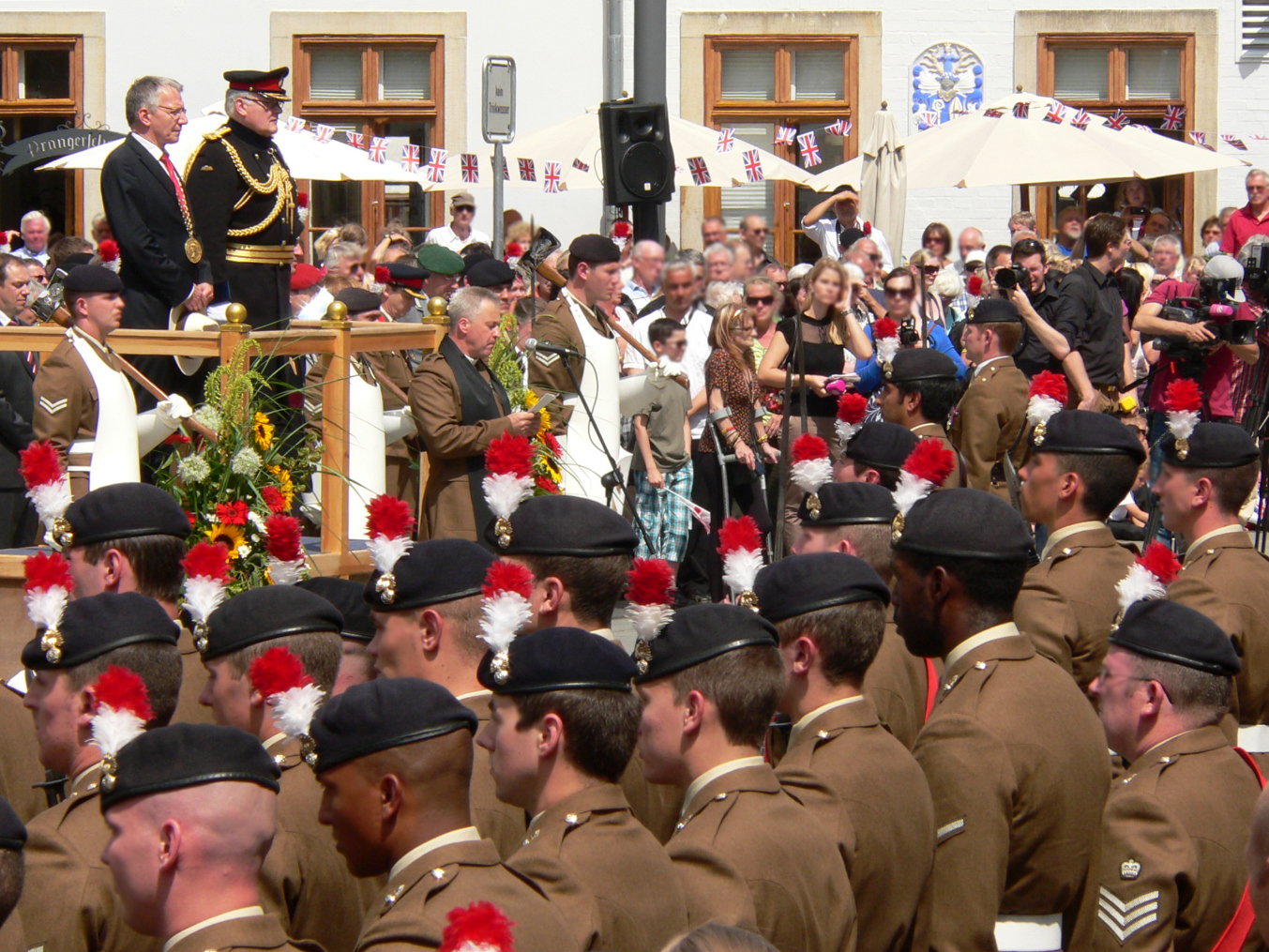
Wall addressing British troops in Celle

Wall graduated from the Royal Military Academy Sandhurst and was commissioned into the Royal Engineers in April 1974 with his commission being confirmed in December 1974, with effect from 9 March the same year. After a short period of military duties, Wall studied engineering at University of Cambridge, before joining airborne forces and going on to serve with the Royal Engineers in Belize and Rhodesia. Wall was promoted to captain on 9 September 1980 and to major on 30 September 1987.

He was appointed Chief of Staff of the 5th Airborne Brigade in 1988, before commanding 9 Parachute Squadron, Royal Engineers from 1990. Promoted to lieutenant colonel on 30 June 1992, he was appointed Commanding Officer of 32 Engineer Regiment in Germany in 1994, and appointed an Officer of the Order of the British Empire in the 1994 Birthday Honours. He was deployed to the Former Republic of Yugoslavia in Spring 1996, promoted to colonel on 30 June and awarded the Queen's Commendation for Valuable Service in November. He was then promoted to brigadier on 31 December 1998 with seniority from 30 June 1998, before assuming command of 24 Airmobile Brigade in 1999. Wall was responsible for converting the formation into 16 Air Assault Brigade later that year.

=== High command ===
In 2001, Wall became Chief of Joint Force Operations at Permanent Joint Headquarters Northwood, and was appointed a Commander of the Order of the British Empire in the 2002 New Year Honours. Wall went on to serve as Chief of Staff of the National Contingent HQ in Qatar, overseeing UK operations in Iraq, from January 2003. In May 2003, Wall assumed the appointment of General Officer Commanding 1st (UK) Armoured Division with the substantive rank of major general, in which capacity he was responsible for security in Basra in Iraq. In 2005, he became Deputy Chief of Joint Operations at the Permanent Joint Headquarters Northwood and, on 1 August 2007, he was appointed Deputy Chief of the Defence Staff (Commitments) and promoted to lieutenant general. Appointed a Knight Commander of the Order of the Bath in the 2009 Birthday Honours, Wall succeeded General Sir Kevin O'Donoghue as Chief Royal Engineer on 10 May 2009 before taking up the post of Commander-in-Chief, Land Forces and receiving promotion to the substantive rank of general on 17 July 2009. He was also appointed the aide-de-camp general to Queen Elizabeth II on 30 October 2009.

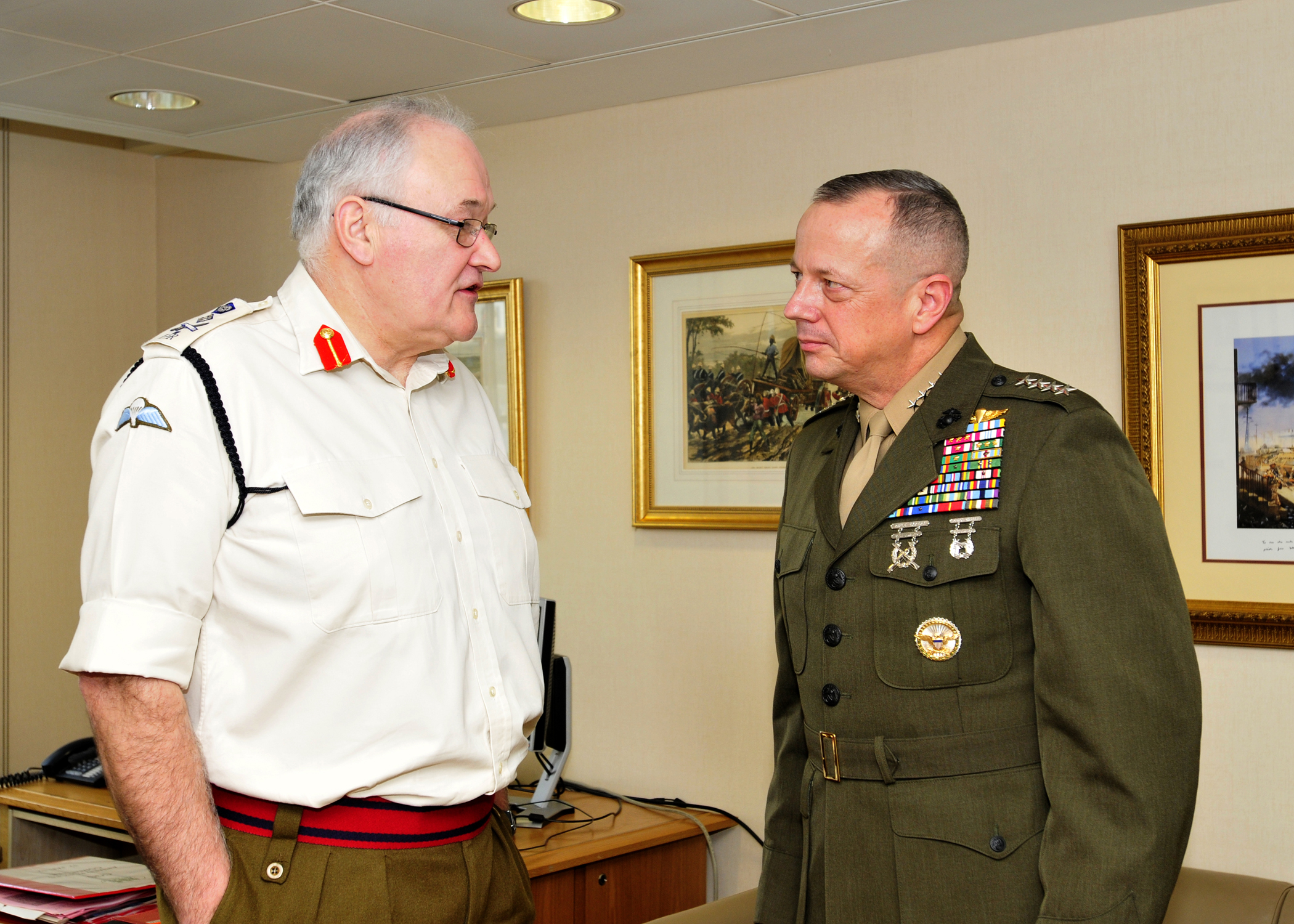
Wall meets with General John R. Allen, commander ISAF, in January 2012.

On 6 January 2010, Wall gave evidence to the Iraq Inquiry in which he claimed that troops were vulnerable in their base at Basra Palace and in May 2010, Wall was listed amongst the top 172 government servants that earn more than the Prime Minister, with a salary of £160–165,000, excluding his non-contributory final salary pension. Then on 29 July 2010, Wall was named as the next Chief of the General Staff, the professional head of the British Army. On 15 September 2010 Wall took over the post from General Sir David Richards who became Chief of the Defence Staff in late October 2010.

On 24 June 2011, it was reported that Wall, who had publicly questioned Prime Minister David Cameron's handling of the conflict in Afghanistan, would – in a major defence reorganisation that would also affect the other service chiefs – lose his position on the Defence Board, the highest non-ministerial Ministry of Defence committee, which makes decision on all aspects of military policy. The changes took effect on 1 November 2011.

Amidst ministerial, media and political pressure from both sides of the House, Wall told an army magazine in April 2014 that lifting the ban on women serving in combat units was "something we need to be considering seriously." It came to light that, under European law, the policy of preventing female soldiers from applying for certain jobs in the army was to be reviewed by 2018, and that the US, Australia, Canada, France, Germany, Holland, Denmark, Norway and Israel all allowed women to serve in combat units. The Times had reported that his main motivation for changing this rule was showing potential female recruits that the army was an equal opportunities employer:

I want every woman in the country to know the service is open to them and we need to make sure we get that message across. Women need to see they have equal opportunities right throughout the organisation. Allowing them to be combat troops would make us look more normal to society, but there will always be people who say the close battle is no place for female soldiers.

Wall was appointed Colonel Commandant of the Royal Electrical and Mechanical Engineers in 2002, and Colonel Commandant of the Corps of Royal Engineers in November 2003. He was appointed a Knight Grand Cross of the Order of the Bath in the 2013 Birthday Honours. From April 2012 until August 2016 Wall served as the Colonel Commandant of the Brigade of Gurkhas. He was elected an Honorary Fellow of the Royal Academy of Engineering in 2013.

Since leaving the army, Wall co-founded and is Chief Executive of a leadership and change consultancy, Amicus Limited.

== Personal life ==
In 1980 Wall married Fiona Anne Simpson; they have two sons. He lists his interests as sports. He was appointed as a Deputy Lieutenant for the County of Somerset on 2 February 2015. This gave him the Post Nominal Letters "DL" for Life.

Military offices
Preceded by Robin Brims	General Officer Commanding 1st (UK) Armoured Division; 2003–2005	Succeeded by John Cooper
Preceded by Charles Style	Deputy Chief of the Defence Staff (Commitments); 2007–2009	Succeeded by Simon Mayall
Preceded by Sir David Richards	Commander-in-Chief, Land Forces; 2009–2010	Succeeded by Sir Nick Parker
Preceded by Sir David Richards	Chief of the General Staff; 2010–2014	Succeeded by Sir Nick Carter
Honorary titles
Preceded by Sir Kevin O'Donoghue	Chief Royal Engineer; 2009 –2013	Succeeded by Sir Mark Mans
