= Richard Barrons =

British Army officer (born 1959)

General Sir Richard Barrons KCB CBE
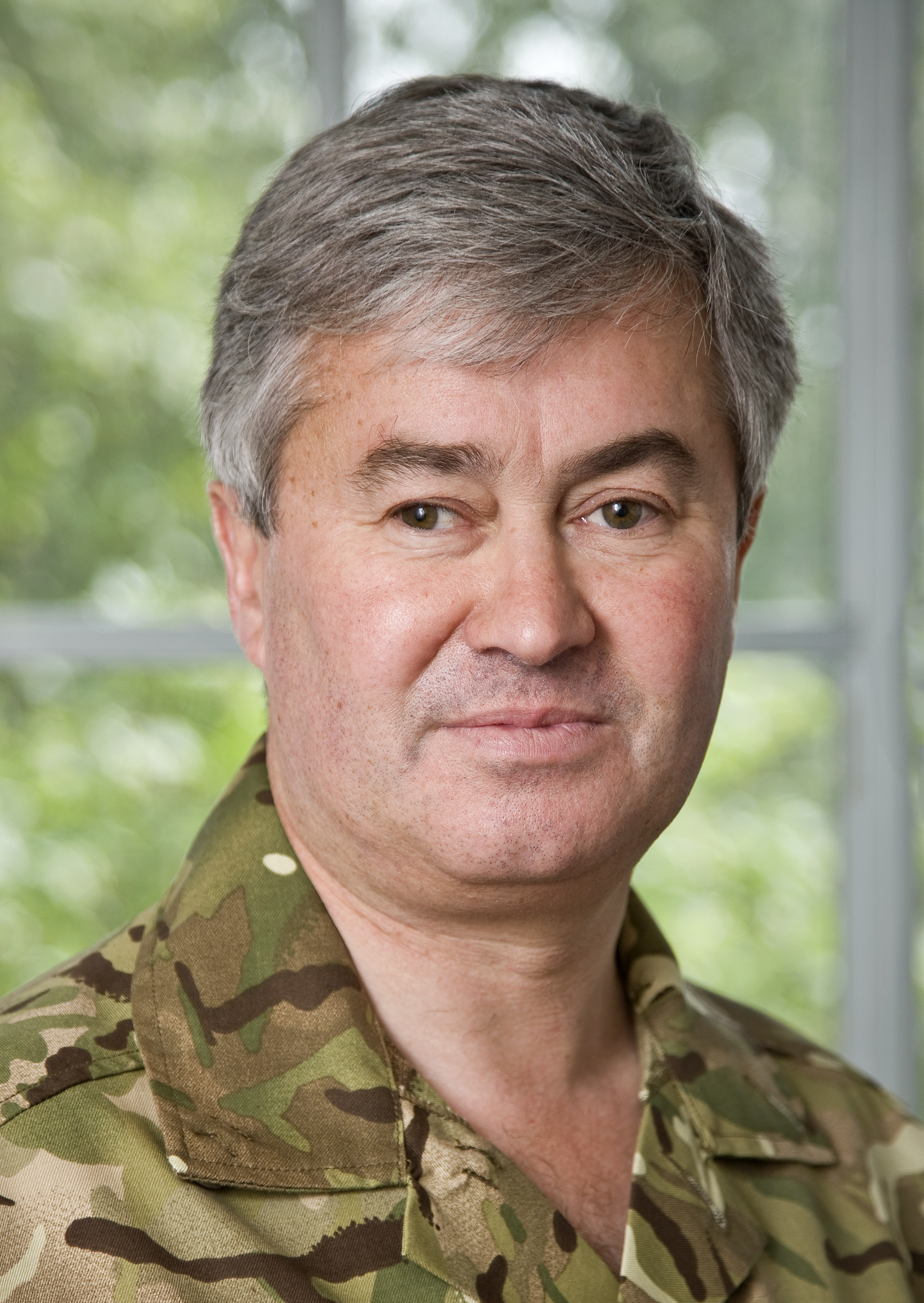
- Born: 17 May 1959 (age 67); Northampton, Northamptonshire, England
- Military career
- Allegiance: United Kingdom
- Branch: British Army
- Service years: 1977–2016
- Rank: General
- Service number: 504825
- Unit: Royal Artillery
- Commands: Joint Forces Command; Deputy Commanding General, Multi-National Corps – Iraq; 39th Infantry Brigade; 3rd Regiment Royal Horse Artillery
- Conflicts: The Troubles; Kosovo War; Iraq War; War in Afghanistan
- Awards: Knight Commander of the Order of the Bath; Commander of the Order of the British Empire; Queen's Commendation for Valuable Service (2); Officer of the Legion of Merit (United States)
- Other work: Author, guest speaker, lobbyist Chairman of the Royal Artillery Museum

General Sir Richard Lawson Barrons, KCB, CBE (born 17 May 1959) is a retired British Army officer. He was the Commander of Joint Forces Command from April 2013 until his retirement in April 2016. He currently leads the Defence and Resilience Group for lobby group CityUK.

Barrons' early career was spent in various staff and field posts in the UK, across Europe, and in the Far East. He also spent time working at the Ministry of Defence and in education. Sent to Germany in 1991, Barrons then served his first tour of duty in the Balkans in 1993. Returning to the UK, Barrons took up a staff position and went on to do a tour in Northern Ireland and then to become a Military Assistant, first to the High Representative for Bosnia and Herzegovina and then to the Chief of the General Staff. Between 2000 and 2003, Barrons served again in the Balkans, in Afghanistan during the early days of International Security Assistance Force, and then in a staff position in Basra, Iraq.

As a brigadier in 2003, Barrons served his second tour in Northern Ireland, this time as a brigade commander. In 2005, he was appointed to Assistant Chief of Staff, Commitments, a senior staff position. He was promoted to major general in 2008 and deployed to Iraq for the second time, this time to Baghdad, with responsibility for joint operations. He then served briefly with the NATO Allied Rapid Reaction Corps before being sent to Afghanistan for the second time, when he headed an ISAF reintegration unit to provide incentives for Taliban soldiers to surrender. He later became Deputy Chief of the Defence Staff (Operations).

== Early life ==
Barrons was born on 17 May 1959 in Northampton, Northamptonshire, England. He was educated at Merchant Taylors' School, Northwood, an all-boys independent school in London.

== Military career ==
On 2 September 1977, Barrons was commissioned as a second lieutenant on probation in the Royal Regiment of Artillery, British Army. Having received a university cadetship, he then studied philosophy, politics and economics at The Queen's College, Oxford. He became a full-time army officer on 21 June 1980. His commission was confirmed in 1981, with seniority from 17 May 1977, and he was promoted to lieutenant with seniority from 17 May 1979. Between 1980 and 1990, he served in various positions across Europe and the Far East as well as in a staff position at the Ministry of Defence in London. He was promoted to captain on 19 November 1983. and took a master's degree in Defence Administration in 1990, after which he attended the British Army's Staff College, Camberley, in 1991.

Barrons' first field officer promotion was to major in September 1991. He was sent to Germany to take up a position as chief of staff, 11 Armoured Brigade, which then deployed to the Balkans in 1993. Barrons then served briefly as Balkans desk officer at the Directorate of Military Operations and before becoming battery commander of B Battery, 1st Regiment Royal Horse Artillery from 1994 to 1996, which included a tour of duty in Northern Ireland. He was promoted to lieutenant colonel on 30 June 1997. After promotion, he served again in Bosnia, as Military Assistant (MA) to the High Representative for Bosnia and Herzegovina and then, back in the UK, as MA to the Chief of the General Staff.

He went on to command 3rd Regiment Royal Horse Artillery, headquartered in Hohne Germany, with which he deployed to the Balkans again in 2001. At the end of 2001, Barrons was appointed chief of staff of the 3rd (United Kingdom) Division and immediately deployed to Afghanistan, where the division assisted in establishing the International Security Assistance Force. After serving in Afghanistan, Barrons returned to the UK to attend the Higher Command and Staff Course, before promotion to colonel in June 2002. Barrons' next deployment was to Iraq in 2003 as chief of staff, Multinational Division (South East), stationed in Basra.

=== High command ===
Barrons was promoted to brigadier on 31 December 2003, with seniority from 30 June 2003. Upon promotion, he was posted to Northern Ireland, commanding 39 Infantry Brigade in Belfast, a position he held for two years. After Northern Ireland, he was appointed Assistant Chief of Staff, Commitments in 2005, with day-to-day responsibility for British Army operations.

Barrons attained general officer status in 2008, when he was promoted to the substantive rank of major general and appointed Deputy Commanding General, Multi-National Corps – Iraq. He was posted to Baghdad, where he had responsibility for overseeing joint operations conducted by the multinational force and the Iraqi Army. Having served in Iraq, he returned to the UK to take up a staff post in April 2009 as chief of staff to the NATO Allied Rapid Reaction Corps (ARRC), but the appointment was short-lived as, in October 2009, he deployed to Afghanistan at short notice to establish a force reintegration unit, part of an effort to persuade Taliban fighters to rejoin society by offering alternatives to fighting, such as jobs and training. Barrons defended the controversial scheme in interviews, saying that it was not "about buying insurgents off the battlefield" and that "the idea is that you get the whole community benefiting and turning against the insurgency". In a later interview, Barrons also said "I am absolutely convinced it can be done, and that the time is right. This is an opportunity the Afghan people aren't going to get again. Most of them realize that, and are keen to take it now".

Barrons' position, as of February 2011, was as Assistant Chief of the General Staff. In May 2011 he became Deputy Chief of the Defence Staff (Operations) in the rank of lieutenant general. On 24 January 2013 it was announced that he was to be appointed Commander Joint Forces Command in April 2013. As of 2015, Barrons was paid a salary of between £175,000 and £179,999 by the department, making him one of the 328 most highly paid people in the British public sector at that time. In April 2016, he handed over command of Joint Forces Command to General Sir Christopher Deverell.

== Other work ==
Barrons co-authored a book, The Business General, published by Vermilion, with Deborah Tom in 2006. He has also lectured as a guest speaker, including at the University of Oxford. As of 2010, Barrons was chairman of the Royal Artillery Museum.

From May 2013 to 2019, he was Colonel Commandant of the Honourable Artillery Company.

A week after Russia's invasion of Ukraine in 2022, Barrons said, "How does public opinion in the UK and other countries react to people who look and live like us being slaughtered", and then advocated "the application of NATO military power, perhaps through the sky and definitely against [Russian] heavy weapons."

Barrons led the Strategic Defence Review in 2024/25.

In 2025, after co-authoring the review, he became head of the Defence and Resilience Group at the lobby group CityUK.

In 2026, Barrons took part in a TV series called The Wargame, hosted by Cathy Newman, in which members of the cast "reflect on the pressures of decision-making at the highest level and explore the wider questions raised from this thrilling documentary series".

== Honours and decorations ==
Barrons was appointed a Member of the Order of the British Empire (MBE) in 1993 "in recognition of service during operations in the former Republic of Yugoslavia", and was promoted to Officer of the Order of the British Empire (OBE) in the 2000 New Year Honours. On 29 April 2003, he was promoted to Commander of the Order of the British Empire (CBE) "in recognition of gallant and distinguished services in Afghanistan during the period 1 April 2002 to 30 September 2002". He was appointed a Knight Commander of the Order of the Bath (KCB) in the 2013 Birthday Honours.

In 2004, Barrons was awarded his first Queen's Commendation for Valuable Service for services in Iraq the previous year, his second coming in 2006 in recognition of his service in Northern Ireland in 2005. He was also awarded the United States Legion of Merit (Degree of Officer) "in recognition of gallant and distinguished services during coalition operations in Iraq".

Knight Commander of the Order of the Bath (KCB)	2013 Birthday Honours.
Commander of the Order of the British Empire (CBE)	2003 'in recognition of gallant and distinguished services in Afghanistan during the period 1 April 2002 to 30 September 2002'.
Officer of the Order of the British Empire (OBE)	2000 New Year Honours.
Member of the Order of the British Empire (MBE)	1993 "in recognition of service during operations in the former Republic of Yugoslavia",
Officer of the Legion of Merit (United States)	2010 'in recognition of gallant and distinguished services during coalition operations in Iraq'.
Queen's Commendation for Valuable Service	2003; 2005

Military offices
Preceded by Bruce Brealey	Deputy Commanding General Multi-National Corps – Iraq; 2008–2009	Succeeded by Bill Moore
Preceded by James Bucknall	Assistant Chief of the General Staff; 2010–2011	Succeeded by James Everard
Preceded by Simon Mayall	Deputy Chief of the Defence Staff (Operations); 2011–2013	Succeeded by James Everard
Preceded by Sir Stuart Peach	Commander, Joint Forces Command; 2013–2016	Succeeded by Sir Christopher Deverell
Preceded by Barney White-Spunner	Colonel Commandant and President, Honourable Artillery Company; 2013–2019	Succeeded by Patrick Sanders
