= Tom Beckett =

British Army officer

Lieutenant General Sir Tom Beckett KCB CBE
- Born: 1962 (age 63–64); Bahrain
- Military career
- Allegiance: United Kingdom
- Branch: British Army
- Service years: 1984–2018
- Rank: Lieutenant General
- Commands: 20th Armoured Brigade; 1st Battalion the Parachute Regiment
- Conflicts: Gulf War; Sierra Leone Civil War; Iraq War; War in Afghanistan
- Awards: Knight Commander of the Order of the Bath; Commander of the Order of the British Empire

Lieutenant General Sir Thomas Anthony Beckett, KCB, CBE (born 1962) is a former British Army officer. He served as Chief of Staff for the International Security Assistance Force in Afghanistan.

== Early life and education ==
Beckett was born in 1962 in Bahrain. He was educated at Blackrock College, an all-boys Catholic school in Dublin, Ireland. During his army career, he studied at Cranfield University: he graduated with a Master of Arts degree in military studies in 1994 and a Master of Science degree in global security in 2002.

== Military career ==
Beckett was commissioned into the Queen's Royal Irish Hussars in 1984. After serving in the Gulf War in 1991 and Sierra Leone Civil War in 2001, he became commanding officer of 1st Battalion the Parachute Regiment in 2002 in which role he was deployed for the Invasion of Iraq in 2003.

Beckett became deputy director, Higher Command and Staff Course in 2005, commander of the 20th Armoured Brigade in 2007 (in which role he was again deployed to Iraq) and Director Commitments at Headquarters Land Forces in 2009. He went on to be Deputy Commander of the NATO Rapid Deployable Italian Corps in July 2010 in which role was deployed as chief of staff for the International Security Assistance Force in Afghanistan. Beckett became Defence Senior Advisor Middle East at the Ministry of Defence with the rank of lieutenant general in late 2014. In the 2018 Queen's Birthday Honours, he was appointed a Knight Commander of the Order of the Bath.

Beckett retired from the British Army in 2018. He held the position as Regimental Colonel of the Queen′s Royal Hussars from 2014 to 2023.

== Later career ==
Since 2018, Beckett has been executive director of International Institute for Strategic Studies – Middle East.
