= Adrian Bradshaw (British Army officer) =

British Army general (born 1958)

General Sir Adrian Bradshaw KCB OBE DL
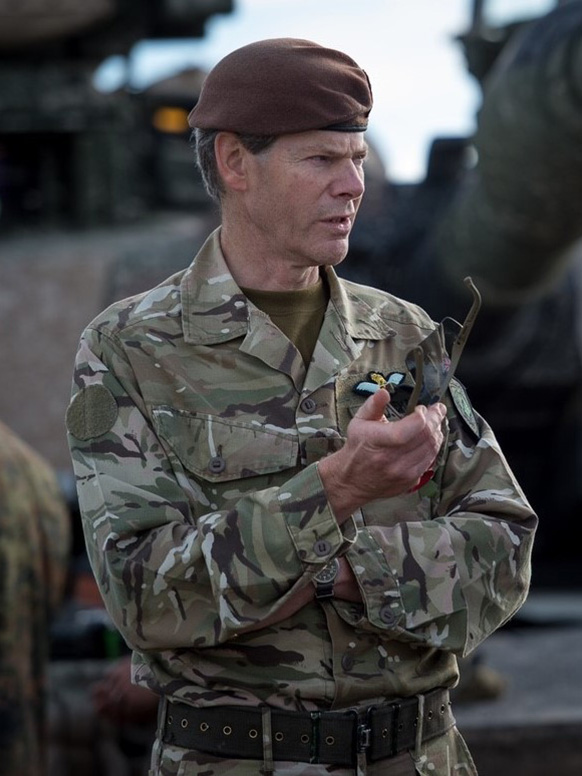
- Bradshaw in camouflage fatigues
- Born: 1958 (age 67–68)
- Military career
- Allegiance: United Kingdom
- Branch: British Army
- Service years: 1980–2017
- Rank: General
- Commands: Deputy Supreme Allied Commander Europe; Commander Land Forces; 1st (UK) Armoured Division; Special Forces; 7th Armoured Brigade; King's Royal Hussars
- Conflicts: Bosnian War; Iraq War
- Awards: Knight Commander of the Order of the Bath; Officer of the Order of the British Empire; Officer of the Legion of Merit (United States); Commander of the Order of the Crown (Belgium)

General Sir Adrian John Bradshaw, KCB, OBE, DL (born 1958) is a former British Army officer who served as Deputy Supreme Allied Commander Europe. He also served as Director Special Forces from 2006 to 2009 and Commander Land Forces in 2013.

== Early life ==
Bradshaw was educated at Bloxham School, received a Bachelor of Science degree from the University of Reading in 1979, and obtained a Master of Science degree in Defence Studies in 1991 as well a Master of Arts degree in International Relations in 2005, both from King's College London.

== Military career ==
Bradshaw was commissioned into the 14th/20th King's Hussars in 1980. In 1994 he became commanding officer of the King's Royal Hussars, commanding the KRH Battlegroup in Bosnia. For his services in the former Yugoslavia, Bradshaw was appointed an Officer of the Order of the British Empire in 1998. On promotion to brigadier, he became senior advisor to the Combined Forces Air Component Command preparing for the invasion of Iraq. He was Deputy Commander of Task Force West during the invasion of Iraq in March 2003 and took charge of the 7th Armoured Brigade during the initial stabilisation operations in April 2003, for which he was appointed an Officer of the Legion of Merit by the United States. By 2006 he was Director Special Forces.

Bradshaw was appointed a Companion of the Order of the Bath in the 2009 New Year Honours and, that March, was appointed General Officer Commanding 1st (UK) Armoured Division which undertook a major training exercise in the Czech Republic in May 2009. He became Deputy Commander International Security Assistance Force in Afghanistan and United Kingdom National Contingent Commander in Afghanistan in the rank of lieutenant general in November 2011.

Bradshaw assumed the role of Commander Land Forces in succession to General Sir Nick Parker in January 2013. He was advanced to Knight Commander of the Order of the Bath in the 2013 Birthday Honours, and was succeeded by Lieutenant General Nick Carter as Commander Land Forces in November 2013.

Bradshaw was promoted to general and appointed Deputy Supreme Allied Commander Europe on 28 March 2014. As of 2015, Bradshaw was paid a salary of between £170,000 and £174,999 by the department, making him one of the 328 most highly paid people in the British public sector at that time. He retired on 12 August 2017.

Bradshaw held the honorary position of Regimental Colonel of the King's Royal Hussars from 2017 to 2022. In 2022 Bradshaw was granted permission to wear the insignia of a Commander of the Order of the Crown, which had been conferred on him by the King of Belgium.

== Later career ==
In 2017, Bradshaw joined the Blesma, The Limbless Veterans Board of Trustees and was elected Chairman. In the same year, he was Vice-Chairman of the Combined Services Polo Association.

On 7 June 2018, during the annual Founder's Day Parade at the Royal Hospital Chelsea, it was announced that Bradshaw would become the new Governor of the Hospital in September 2018, succeeding General Sir Redmond Watt.

Military offices
Preceded by Jonathan Shaw	Director Special Forces; 2006–2009	Succeeded by Jacko Page
Preceded by Graham Binns	General Officer Commanding 1st (UK) Armoured Division; 2009–2011	Succeeded by James Bashall
Preceded by James Bucknall	Deputy Commander, ISAF; 2011–2012	Succeeded by Nick Carter
Preceded by Sir Nick Parker	Commander Land Forces; 2013	Succeeded by Nick Carter
Preceded by Sir Richard Shirreff	Deputy Supreme Allied Commander Europe; 2014–2017	Succeeded by Sir James Everard
Honorary titles
Preceded by Sir Redmond Watt	Governor, Royal Hospital Chelsea; 2018–Present	Incumbent
