= Nick Carter (British Army officer) =

British Army officer (born 1959)

General Sir Nick Carter GCB CBE DSO
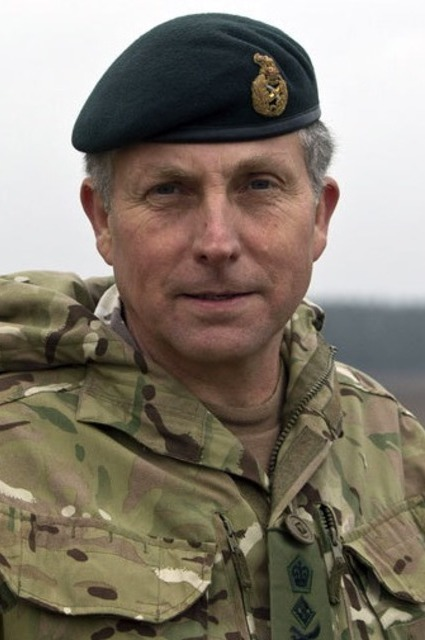
- Carter in 2018
- Born: 11 February 1959 (age 67); Nairobi, British Kenya
- Education: Winchester College; Royal Military Academy, Sandhurst
- Spouse: Louise Anne Ewart (m. 1984)
- Children: 4
- Military career
- Allegiance: United Kingdom
- Branch: British Army
- Service years: 1978–2021
- Rank: General
- Service number: 505216
- Commands: Chief of the Defence Staff (2018–21); Chief of the General Staff (2014–18); Commander Land Forces (2013–14); 6th Division (2009–11); 20th Armoured Brigade (2004–05); 2nd Battalion, Royal Green Jackets (1998–00)
- Conflicts: The Troubles; Bosnian War; Kosovo War; Iraq War; War in Afghanistan
- Awards: Knight Grand Cross of the Order of the Bath; Commander of the Order of the British Empire; Companion of the Distinguished Service Order; Queen's Commendation for Valuable Service (2); Commander of the Legion of Merit (United States); NATO Meritorious Service Medal (NATO)

General Sir Nicholas Patrick Carter (born 11 February 1959) is a retired senior British Army officer who served as chief of the defence staff from June 2018 to November 2021.

Carter was commissioned into the British Army in 1978. He served as commanding officer of 2nd Battalion, Royal Green Jackets in the late 1990s, deploying with his unit to Bosnia in 1998 and Kosovo in 1999. After service in Afghanistan, he took command of the 20th Armoured Brigade in 2004 and commanded British forces in Basra. He was subsequently appointed general officer commanding 6th Division, which was deployed to Afghanistan with Carter as commander ISAF Regional Command South, before he became director-general land warfare. After that he became deputy commander land forces and was the main architect of the Army 2020 concept.

Following a tour as deputy commander, International Security Assistance Force, Carter assumed the position of commander land forces in November 2013. In September 2014, he became head of the British Army as chief of the general staff, succeeding General Sir Peter Wall. In June 2018 he succeeded Air Chief Marshal Sir Stuart Peach as Chief of the Defence Staff, being himself succeeded by Admiral Sir Tony Radakin in November 2021.

== Military career ==
=== Early career ===
Born in Nairobi, Colony of Kenya, the son of Gerald and Elspeth Carter, Carter was educated at Winchester College and the Royal Military Academy Sandhurst. He was commissioned into the Royal Green Jackets as second lieutenant on 8 April 1978, initially holding a short service commission. Promoted to lieutenant on 8 April 1980, he switched to a full career commission in 1982, and was promoted to captain on 8 October 1984. As a junior officer he served in Northern Ireland, Cyprus, Germany and Great Britain. Promoted to major on 30 September 1991, he attended Staff College, Camberley later that year before becoming a company commander with 3rd Battalion, Royal Green Jackets in 1992. He became Military Assistant to the Assistant Chief of the General Staff in 1994 and, having been appointed a Member of the Order of the British Empire in the 1996 New Year Honours, he joined the directing staff at the Staff College later that year.

Carter was promoted lieutenant colonel on 30 June 1996. In 1998 he was appointed commanding officer of 2nd Battalion, Royal Green Jackets in which role he was deployed to Bosnia in 1998 and Kosovo in 1999. For his service in Bosnia, he was awarded the Queen's Commendation for Valuable Service on 7 May 1999. In Kosovo, Carter commanded a group of peacekeepers on a bridge over the River Ibar at Kosovska Mitrovica where he was tasked with keeping apart thousands of Serbs and Albanians gathered on either side of the bridge. Carter later described the role as being the "meat in the sandwich". He was advanced to Officer of the Order of the British Empire on 3 November 2000.

=== High command ===
Carter was promoted to colonel on 31 December 2000 (with seniority from 30 June) and advanced to Commander of the Order of the British Empire on 29 April 2003, following service in the War in Afghanistan. He was promoted brigadier on 31 December 2003 (with seniority from 30 June), and in 2004 he was given command of 20th Armoured Brigade, commanding British forces in Basra, at one point stating that British forces could be in Iraq for "as long as a decade". On 7 September 2004 he was awarded a further Queen's Commendation for Valuable Service for his service in Iraq.

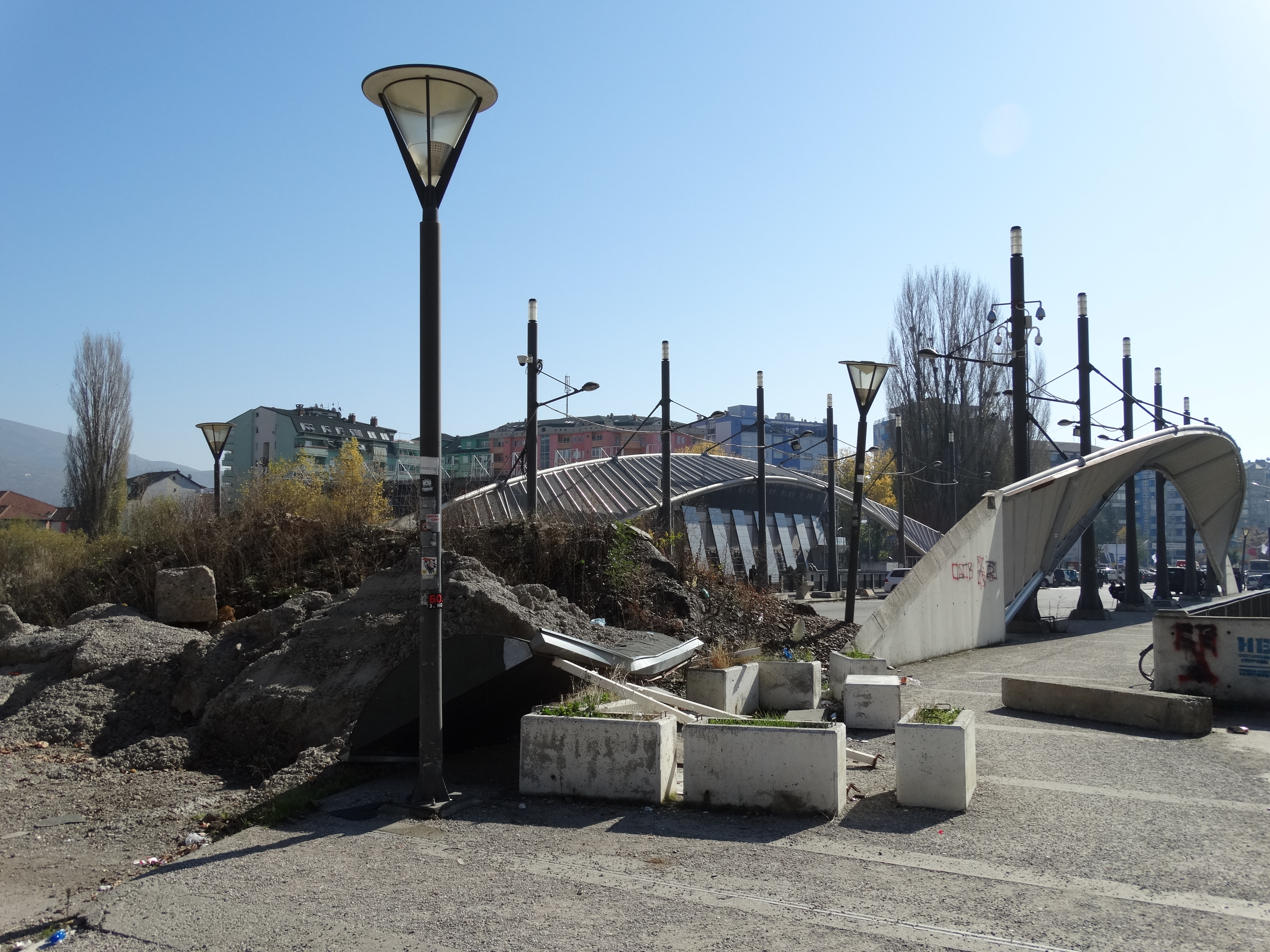
The Ibar River Bridge where Carter commanded a group of peacekeepers

Carter became Director of Army Resources and Plans at the Ministry of Defence in 2006 and was given the honorary appointment of Deputy Colonel of The Rifles on 1 February 2007 (the successor regiment to the Royal Green Jackets) – a post he held until 1 November 2009. Promoted to major general on 23 January 2009, became general officer commanding 6th Division which was deployed to Afghanistan with Carter as Commander ISAF Regional Command South. In September 2009, referring to the efforts of UK and NATO forces, Carter said that "time was not on our side". After returning to the UK in November 2010, he gave an interview in which he warned that "the insurgency is resilient, and alive and well".

Carter became director-general land warfare early in 2011 and, having been appointed a Companion of the Distinguished Service Order in March 2011, he was promoted to lieutenant general and appointed Commander Field Army in November 2011 (the role redesignated Deputy Commander Land Forces in January 2012). He was the main architect of the Army 2020 concept and reported on his recommendations in April 2012. He assumed the post of deputy commander, International Security Assistance Force (ISAF), under the command of American general, John R. Allen, in September 2012 and, having handed over his command at ISAF in July 2013, he became commander land forces in November 2013.

Carter was appointed Knight Commander of the Order of the Bath (KCB) in the 2014 New Year Honours. On 21 February 2014 it was announced that Carter would assume the post of Chief of the General Staff. He took up his post and was promoted to full general on 5 September 2014. As of 2015, Carter was paid a salary of between £170,000 and £174,999 by the department, making him one of the 328 most highly paid people in the British public sector at that time. Carter was awarded the US Legion of Merit on 18 March 2016 for services in Afghanistan.

On 1 February 2013, he succeeded Sir Nick Parker as colonel-commandant of The Rifles.

In January 2018, Carter used a speech in London to enter publicly into the debate over defence spending. According to Carter failure to keep up with Russia will leave the UK exposed, particularly to unorthodox, hybrid warfare. He also said that one of the biggest threats posed is from cyber-attacks that target both military and civilian life. Carter said: "Our ability to pre-empt or respond to threats will be eroded if we don't keep up with our adversaries."

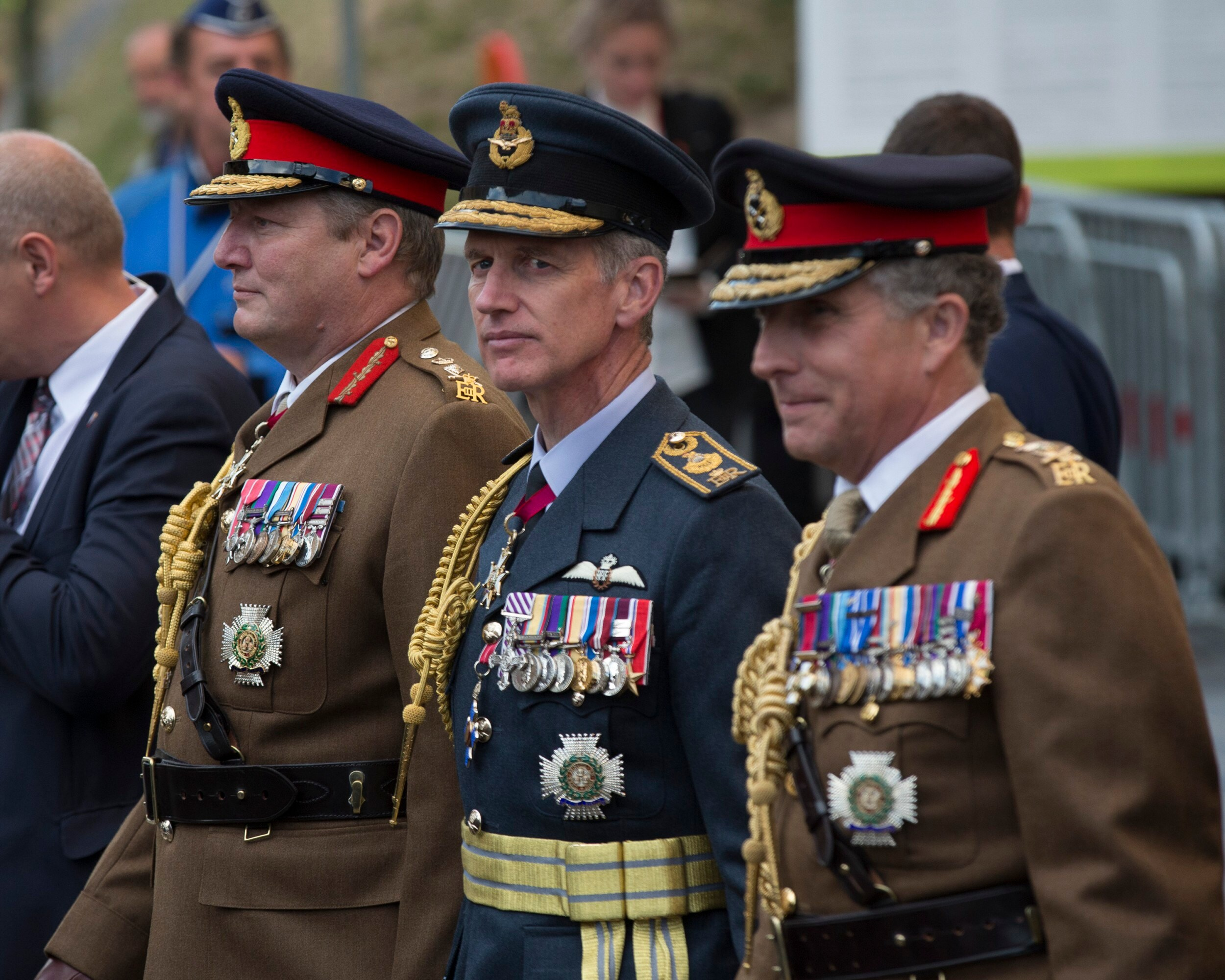
Carter (right) with other service chiefs at the RAF 100 celebrations in 2018

In June 2018, Carter succeeded Air Chief Marshal Sir Stuart Peach as Chief of the Defence Staff.

In August 2018, Carter said he would not allow British soldiers to be "chased" by people making "vexatious claims" about their conduct during the Troubles in Northern Ireland. Carter said serving and former service personnel should face action for "genuine" wrongdoing. But he vowed groundless cases "will not happen on my watch".

In 2018, Carter also became the patron for the UK charity Supporting Wounded Veterans.

Carter was appointed Knight Grand Cross of the Order of the Bath (GCB) in the 2019 Birthday Honours.

In 2020, Carter was one of the senior public servants who took part in the Government's daily coronavirus briefings.

On 1 December 2021, Carter relinquished the appointment of aide-de-camp general to the Queen.

In 2024, Carter joined the Tony Blair Institute for Global Change as a Strategic Counsellor for Peace and Security.

=== Criticism ===
Carter's conduct and command in Afghanistan was criticised by American officer Colonel Harry Tunnell, former Brigade Commander of 5/2 Stryker Brigade Combat Team, alleging a "gross lack of concern for subordinates"; however, Tunnell himself was strongly criticised in a formal US Army review for his brigade's "lack of discipline" and "contempt for the normal Army rules". The report's author concluded: "Colonel Tunnell is no longer in command... If still in command, I would recommend that Colonel Tunnell be relieved of his responsibilities as a brigade commander."

In further criticism, Lieutenant General Daniel P. Bolger claimed that "young riflemen paid the price" for Carter's "risk-averse" mentality and his unwillingness to allow his troops to defend themselves. Bolger also claimed that Carter refused to visit the front line and only visited safe positions by helicopter, while frequently refusing requests for aircraft and artillery support from troops under his command, stating: "He's not the type of general I would put in charge of anything." Lieutenant General Ben Hodges, who commanded US Army Europe, and worked under Carter in Afghanistan, strongly rejected this criticism, writing to The Sunday Times that he was "appalled" by Bolger's representation of Carter. The letter, jointly signed with another former subordinate of Carter, went on to observe that Carter's emphasis on avoiding civilian casualties had been crucial to mission success, that the soldiers under his command were never denied the right to defend themselves, and that Carter frequently exposed himself to personal danger by deploying forward to the key towns and villages at the heart of the counter-insurgency effort. Carter Malkasian, an author and CNA analyst writing for The Washington Post, said Bolger was "on thin ice" when criticising those, such as Carter, who "tried to protect innocents".

Carter was also criticised during the run up to the fall of Kabul when he claimed Taliban had changed and that they were "country boys" with a "code of honour". In the light of the criticism, he was backed by the Secretary of State for Defence, Ben Wallace, who said: "Carter knows more than I will ever know about Afghanistan and the Taliban.

In addition he accepted that stating that a "laddish culture" was required to maintain moral amongst soldiers was an error, after a public backlash.

On procurement, his strong backing of the Strike Brigade Concept in Army 2020 Refine, and hence prioritising of Boxer over other programs, was seen by some as the death of the Army having a credible deployable armoured division. This short lived concept of two strike brigades did not exist in the previous Army 2020 vision which had three armoured brigades, and did did not survive following the Integrated Review in 2021.

== Personal life ==
In 1984, Carter married Louise Anne Ewart; they have three sons and one daughter. His interests include golf, cricket, field sports and cycling. Carter was honoured Ad Portas, being received formally by the whole school, at his alma mater, Winchester College, in September 2021.

== Honours and awards ==

Ribbon	Description	Notes
	Knight Grand Cross of the Most Honourable Order of the Bath	Appointed in 2019
	Commander of the Most Excellent of Order of the British Empire	Appointed in 2003
	Companion of the Distinguished Service Order	Appointed in 2011
	General Service Medal (1962)	
	UN Mission in Cyprus	
	NATO Former Republic of Yugoslavia Medal	Queen's Commendation for Valuable Service Awarded in 1999
	NATO Kosovo Medal	
	Operational Service Medal for Afghanistan	With Bar
	Iraq Medal (United Kingdom)	Queen's Commendation for Valuable Service Awarded in 2004
	Queen Elizabeth II Golden Jubilee Medal	
	Queen Elizabeth II Diamond Jubilee Medal	
	Accumulated Campaign Service Medal	
	Medal for Long Service and Good Conduct (Military)	With 2 Bars
	NATO Meritorious Service Medal	
	Commander of the Legion of Merit	Appointed in 2016

== See also ==
- Operation Dragon Strike
- Khosrow Sofla

Military offices
Preceded by Jacko Page	GOC 6th Division; 2009–2011	Division disbanded
Preceded by Adrian Bradshaw	Deputy Commander, ISAF; 2012–2013	Succeeded by John Lorimer
Preceded by Sir Adrian Bradshaw	Commander Land Forces; 2013–2014	Succeeded by James Everard
Preceded by Sir Peter Wall	Chief of the General Staff; 2014–2018	Succeeded by Sir Mark Carleton-Smith
Preceded by Sir Stuart Peach	Chief of the Defence Staff; 2018–2021	Succeeded by Sir Tony Radakin
