= Commander Land Forces =

Former senior officer in the British Army

- Car flag of the Commander Land Forces

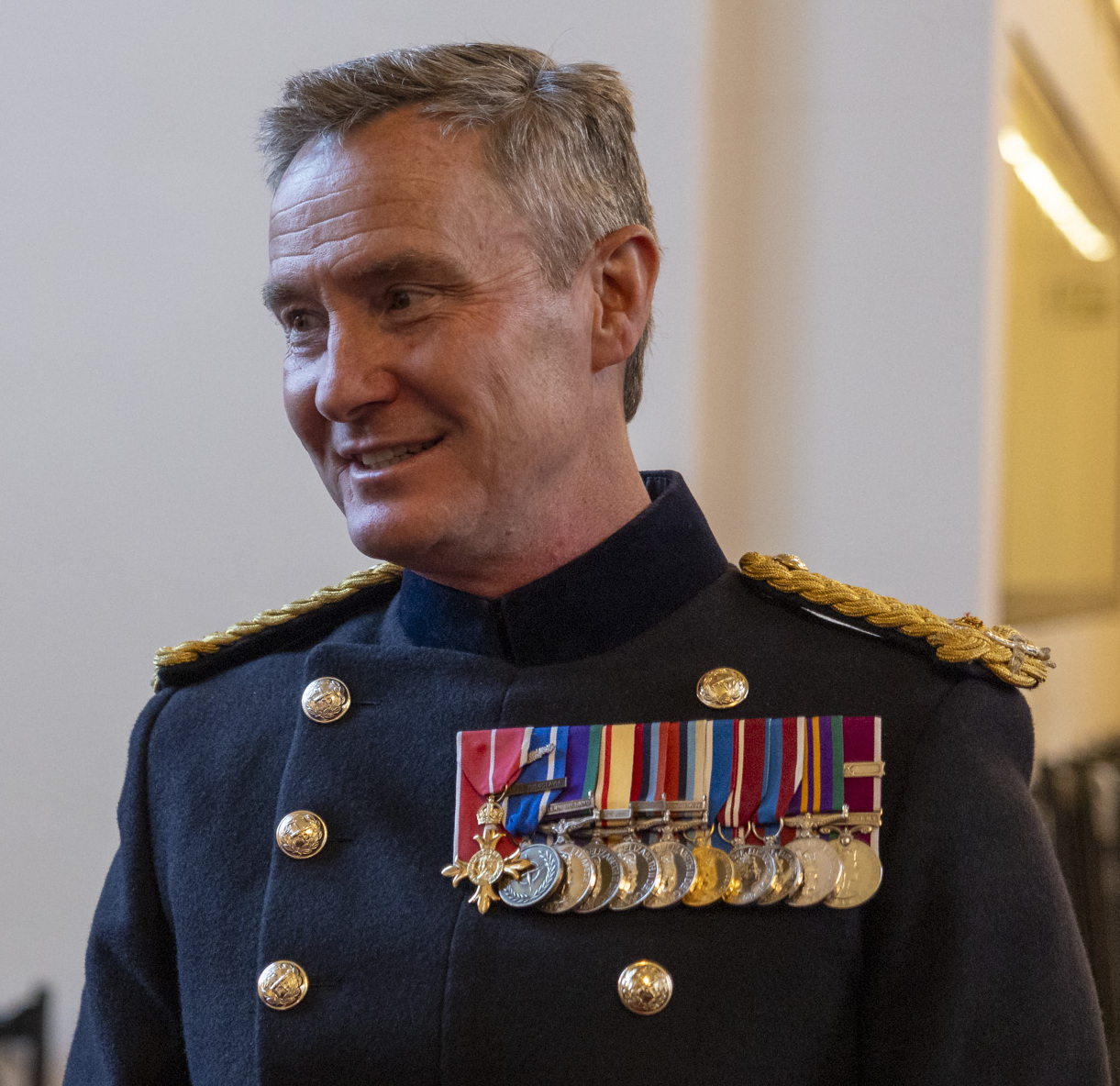
- Incumbent; Lieutenant General Zac Stenning since 30 March 2026
- British Army; Land Forces Command
- Style: General
- Abbreviation: CLF
- Member of: Army Board
- Reports to: Chief of the General Staff
- Nominator: Secretary of State for Defence
- Appointer: The Monarch; On the advice of the Prime Minister, subject to formal approval by the King-in-Council
- Term length: No fixed length
- Precursor: Commander Field Army
- Formation: 1968
- First holder: General Sir John Mogg; As Commander-in-Chief Army Strategic Command

Commander Land Forces is a senior post in the British Army that commands Land Forces Command.

Commander-in-Chief, Land Forces (CINCLAND), was a senior officer in the British Army. CINCLAND commanded HQ Land Forces, an administrative apparatus that had responsibility for all of the army's fighting units in the United Kingdom (excluding Northern Ireland), Germany and Brunei, together with training garrisons in Nepal, Belize, Canada and Kenya. CINCLAND was also the Standing Joint Commander (UK) (SJC (UK)), with responsibility for the provision of Military Aid to the Civil Power within the United Kingdom. The position had existed since 1968, when it was known as General Officer Commanding Army Strategic Command. In 1972 it became Commander-in-Chief United Kingdom Land Forces (CINCUKLF). As from 1 April 2008, HQ Land Command was renamed HQ Land Forces (HQLF). Therefore, the Commander-in-Chief became Commander-in-Chief of HQ Land Forces.

CINCLAND headed the Commanders-in-Chief Committee, a body established for contingency planning purposes.

The post changed to a three-star position, Commander Land Forces, after 1 November 2011 following a major army command reorganisation. In November 2015, the post of Commander Land Forces was redesignated as Commander Field Army.

On 16 March 2026, it was announced that the post of Commander Land Forces would be reinstated with a global remit for operations, training, and warfare development with Lieutenant General Zac Stenning taking up the role.

== Post holders ==
Holders of the post have been:

Image	Rank	Name	Term began	Term ended	Ref
Commander-in-Chief Army Strategic Command
	General	Sir John Mogg	April 1968	May 1970	
	General	Sir Mervyn Butler	May 1970	November 1971	
	General	Sir Frank King	November 1971	April 1972	
Commander-in-Chief United Kingdom Land Forces
	General	Sir Basil Eugster	April 1972	April 1974	
	General	Sir Roland Gibbs	April 1974	May 1976	
	General	Sir Edwin Bramall	May 1976	April 1978	
	General	Sir John Archer	April 1978	January 1980	
	General	Sir Timothy Creasey	January 1980	April 1981	
	General	Sir John Stanier	April 1981	July 1982	
	General	Sir Frank Kitson	July 1982	June 1985	
	General	Sir James Glover	June 1985	June 1987	
	General	Sir John Chapple	June 1987	September 1988	
	General	Sir Charles Huxtable	September 1988	October 1990	
	General	Sir John Waters	October 1990	March 1993	
	General	Sir John Wilsey	March 1993	April 1995	
Commander-in-Chief Land Command
	General	Sir John Wilsey	April 1995	March 1996	
	General	Sir Roger Wheeler	March 1996	January 1997	
	General	Sir Michael Walker	January 1997	March 2000	
	General	Sir Michael Jackson	March 2000	January 2003	
	General	Sir Timothy Granville-Chapman	January 2003	March 2005	
	General	Sir Richard Dannatt	March 2005	August 2006	
	General	Sir Redmond Watt	August 2006	February 2008	
Commander-in-Chief Land Forces
	General	Sir David Richards	February 2008	July 2009	
	General	Sir Peter Wall	July 2009	July 2010	
	General	Sir Nick Parker	July 2010	November 2011	
Commander United Kingdom Field Army
	Lieutenant General	Redmond Watt	September 2003	March 2005	
	Lieutenant General	Robin Brims	March 2005	October 2007	
	Lieutenant General	Graeme Lamb	October 2007	July 2009	
	Lieutenant General	Barney White-Spunner	July 2009	October 2011	
	Lieutenant General	Nick Carter	October 2011	January 2012	
Commander Land Forces
	General	Sir Nick Parker	November 2011	December 2012	
	Lieutenant General	Adrian Bradshaw	January 2013	November 2013	
	Lieutenant-General	Nick Carter	November 2013	September 2014	
	Lieutenant-General	James Everard	September 2014	November 2015	
Commander Field Army
	Lieutenant General	Sir James Everard	November 2015	December 2016	
	Lieutenant General	Patrick Sanders	December 2016	March 2019	
	Lieutenant General	Ivan Jones	March 2019	April 2021	
	Lieutenant General	Ralph Wooddisse	April 2021	March 2024	
	Lieutenant General	Mike Elviss	March 2024	March 2026	
Commander Land Forces
	Lieutenant-General	Zachary Stenning	March 2026	Incumbent	

== See also ==
- Commander-in-Chief Fleet
- Commander-in-Chief of Air Command
