= Operation Telic order of battle =

British forces in the Iraq War

This is the Operation Telic order of battle, which lists the British forces that took part in Operation Telic, including

- the 2003 Invasion of Iraq,
- subsequent operations during the occupation and military government of the country, and
- stabilisation operations under the Iraqi Interim Government and the Iraqi Transitional Government.

== The invasion (Operation TELIC I) ==
From January 2003 to 11 July 2003:

- Senior British military representative and deputy commanding general, Multinational Force, Iraq: Major-general Freddie Viggers (May 2003 to July 2003)

=== Maritime forces ===
- British maritime component commander - Rear Admiral David Snelson (January 2003 to April 2003)
- British maritime component commander - Major General Tony Milton (April 2003 to July 2003)
- Commander Amphibious Task Group - Commodore Jamie Miller
- HMS Ark Royal (flagship)
  - 4 Sea King ASaC7s of A Flight, 849 Naval Air Squadron
  - 5 Chinook HC2s of No. 18 Squadron RAF
- HMS Ocean
  - 10 Sea King HC4s of 845 Naval Air Squadron
  - 6 Gazelle FAA Gazelle AH1 of 847 Naval Air Squadron
  - 6 Lynx AH7 of 847 Naval Air Squadron
- HMS Cardiff
  - 1 Lynx HAS8 of 815 Naval Air Squadron
- HMS Liverpool
  - 1 Lynx HAS3 of 815 Naval Air Squadron
- HMS Edinburgh
  - 1 Lynx of 815 Naval Air Squadron
- HMS York
  - 1 Lynx of 815 Naval Air Squadron
- HMS Chatham
  - 2 Lynx of 815 Naval Air Squadron
- HMS Richmond (to July 2003)
  - 1 Lynx HMA8 of 815 Naval Air Squadron
- HMS Marlborough
  - 1 Lynx of 815 Naval Air Squadron
- HMS Sandown
- HMS Grimsby
- HMS Bangor
- HMS Blyth
- HMS Ledbury
- HMS Brocklesby
- HMS Roebuck
- HMS Scott
- HMS Splendid
- HMS Turbulent

Support vessels of the Royal Fleet Auxiliary

- RFA Sir Bedivere
- RFA Sir Galahad
- RFA Sir Percivale
- RFA Sir Tristram
- RFA Argus
  - 5 Sea King HAS6s of 820 Naval Air Squadron
- RFA Bayleaf
- RFA Brambleleaf
- RFA Orangeleaf
- RFA Grey Rover
- RFA Fort Austin
- RFA Fort Rosalie
- RFA Fort Victoria
  - 5 Merlin HM1s of 814 Naval Air Squadron
- RFA Diligence
- 2 Lynxes of 814 Naval Air Squadron ashore in Bahrain

=== Air forces ===
- British air forces component commander - Air-Vice Marshal Glenn Torpy
  - Tornado GR4 Wing 1 - 18 Tornado GR4s and GR4As at Ali Al Salem Air Base, Kuwait
    - Part of No. II Squadron
    - Part of No. IX Squadron
    - Part of No. XIII Squadron
    - Part of No. 31 Squadron
    - Part of No. 617 Squadron
  - Tornado GR4 Wing 2 - 12 Tornado GR4s at Al Udeid Air Base, Qatar
    - Part of No. 12 Squadron
    - Part of No. 617 Squadron
  - Harrier Wing 1 - 10 Harrier GR7s
    - Part of No. I Squadron
    - Part of No. 3 Squadron
  - Harrier Wing 2 - 8 Harrier GR7s
    - Part of No. IV Squadron at Al Jaber, Kuwait
  - Leuchars Fighter Wing - 14 Tornado F3s at Prince Sultan in Saudi Arabia
    - Part of No. 43 Squadron
    - Part of No. 111 Squadron
  - Nimrod MR2 Wing - 6 Nimrod MR2s
    - Part of No. 120 Squadron
    - Part of No. 201 Squadron
    - Part of No. 206 Squadron
  - Tristar Detachment - 4 Tristars of No. 216 Squadron
  - VC10 Wing - 7 VC-10s at Prince Sultan Air Base in Saudi Arabia
    - Part of No. 10 Squadron
    - Part of No. 101 Squadron
  - VC10 (for Aeromedical Evacuation) - 1 VC10 C1K at RAF Akrotiri from No. 10 Squadron
  - Sentry Wing - 4 Sentry AEW1s
    - Part of No. VIII Squadron
    - Part of No. 23 Squadron
  - BAe 125 Detachment - 3 BAe 125s of No. XXXII Squadron
  - Hercules Wing - 6 Hercules
  - Canberra Detachment - 2 Canberra PR9s of No. 39 (1 PRU) Squadron (a photo-reconnaissance unit) Azraq Air Base, Jordan
  - Nimrod R1 Detachment - 1 Nimrod R1 of No. 51 Squadron
  - Tactical Communications Wing.
  - Tactical Supply Wing.
  - Royal Air Force Regiment
    - No 3 RAF Force Protection Wing HQ.
    - No 4 RAF Force Protection Wing HQ.
    - No 1 (Field) Squadron RAF Regiment (Ali Al Salem airbase, then attached to 42 Commando RM).
    - No II (Para) Squadron RAF Regiment.
    - No 16 (GBAD) Squadron RAF Regiment.
    - No 51 (Field) Squadron RAF Regiment (incorporating elements of 63 (Field) Squadron RAF Regiment (the Queen's Colour Squadron)).
    - Elements of 2503 (City of Lincoln), 2622 (Highland), 2625 (County of Cornwall) Squadrons Royal Auxiliary Air Force Regiment.
    - Joint Chemical Biological Radiological and Nuclear Regiment.
  - No 5131(Bomb Disposal) Squadron, as part of the Joint Force EOD Group

27 helicopters were also sent to the area, a mixture of Pumas, Chinooks and Merlins, although the breakdown of types within that number is yet to be determined. Beyond the Hercules aircraft that were based in theatre, virtually the whole of the rest of the Hercules fleet, the C-17 fleet, and those Tristars and VC10s that had remained based in the UK were involved in transport operations to and from the Persian Gulf.

=== Ground forces ===
- GOC 1st Armoured Division: Major General Robin Brims (February 2003 to May 2003)
- GOC 1st Armoured Division: Major General Peter Wall (May 2003 to July 2003)
  - 1st Armoured Division Headquarters and Signal Regiment
  - 1st The Queen's Dragoon Guards
  - 12th Regiment, Royal Artillery
  - 1st Battalion, The Duke of Wellington's Regiment (West Riding)
  - 28 Regiment Royal Engineers
  - 1 General Support Regiment, Royal Logistic Corps
  - 2 Close Support Regiment, Royal Logistic Corps
  - 2 Battalion Royal Electrical and Mechanical Engineers
  - 3 Battalion Royal Electrical and Mechanical Engineers
  - 1 Close Support Medical Regiment
  - 5 General Support Medical Regiment
  - 1 Regiment Royal Military Police
  - A (Royal Wiltshire Yeomanry) Squadron and W (Westminster Dragoons) Squadron, Royal Yeomanry
  - Elements of 5 (STA) Royal Regiment of Artillery
  - Elements of 33 (EOD) Regiment Royal Engineers
  - Elements of 32 Regiment Royal Artillery - Phoenix Unmanned Aerial Vehicles
  - Elements of 30 Signal Regiment
  - Elements of 14 Signal Regiment
  - Elements of 1st Military Intelligence Battalion
  - 3 Commando Brigade - Brigadier Jim Dutton
    - Headquarters 3 Commando Brigade
    - 59 Independent (Commando) Squadron Royal Engineers
    - 131 Independent (Commando) Squadron Royal Engineers (Volunteer)
    - 9 (Commando) Assault Squadron
    - 539 (Commando) Assault Squadron
    - 29 (Commando) Regiment Royal Artillery - 18 105 mm howitzers
    - 40 Commando, Royal Marines
    - 42 Commando, Royal Marines
  - 7 Armoured Brigade - Brigadier Graham Binns
    - 7 Armoured Brigade Headquarters and Signal Squadron
    - 32 (Armoured) Regiment Royal Engineers (with 25 Armoured Engineer Squadron attached from 38 Engineer Regiment)
    - 3rd Regiment Royal Horse Artillery - 32 AS-90 155 mm howitzers
    - Royal Scots Dragoon Guards (Carabiniers and Greys) battlegroup, 42 Challenger 2s, 28 Warrior Tracked Armoured Vehicles (Warriors)
    - 1st Battalion Irish Guards
    - 2nd Royal Tank Regiment battlegroup, including elements of 1st Battalion The Light Infantry - 42 Challenger 2s, 28 Warriors
    - The Black Watch (Royal Highland Regiment) battlegroup, including elements of The Royal Scots Dragoon Guards and 2nd Royal Tank Regiment- 28 Challenger 2s, 42 Warriors
    - 1st Battalion Royal Regiment of Fusiliers battlegroup, including elements of Queen's Royal Lancers - 14 Challenger 2s, 42 Warriors
  - 16 Air Assault Brigade - Brigadier 'Jacko' Page
    - 16 Air Assault Brigade Headquarters
    - D Squadron, Household Cavalry Regiment
    - 216 Parachute Squadron Royal Signals
    - Pathfinder Platoon
    - 1st Battalion, Royal Irish Regiment (27th (Inniskillings), 83rd, 87th and The Ulster Defence Regiment)
    - 1st Battalion, The Parachute Regiment
    - 3rd Battalion, The Parachute Regiment
    - 7th Parachute Regiment Royal Horse Artillery
    - 9 Parachute Squadron Royal Engineers
    - 23 (Air Assault) Engineer Regiment
    - 7 Air Assault Battalion Royal Electrical and Mechanical Engineers
    - 13 Air Assault Support Regiment Royal Logistic Corps
    - 16 Close Support Medical Regiment
    - 156 Provost Company Royal Military Police

=== Joint assets ===
- National Support Element
  - 102 Logistic Brigade - Brigadier Shaun Cowlam
    - Headquarters 102 Logistic Brigade
    - 2 Signal Regiment
    - 39 Engineer Regiment
    - 33 Field Hospital
    - 34 Field Hospital
    - 202 Field Hospital (Volunteer)
    - 4 General Support Medical Regiment
    - 3 Battalion Royal Electrical and Mechanical Engineers
    - 6 Supply Regiment Royal Logistic Corps
    - 7 Transport Regiment Royal Logistic Corps
    - 10 Transport Regiment Royal Logistic Corps (attached from 101 Logistic Brigade)
    - 17 Port and Maritime Regiment Royal Logistic Corps
    - 23 Pioneer Regiment Royal Logistic Corps
    - 168 Pioneer Regiment Royal Logistics Corps (101 Squadron)
    - 24 Regiment Royal Logistic Corps
    - 5 Regiment Royal Military Police
    - Elements of 11 Explosive Ordnance Disposal Regiment
- Joint Helicopter Force Headquarters
  - 3 Regiment Army Air Corps
  - Elements of 21 Signal Regiment (AS)
    - Elements of No. 662 Squadron - Lynx AH7s and Gazelle AH1s
    - Elements of No. 663 Squadron - Lynx AH7s and Gazelle AH1s
    - Elements of No. 653 Squadron - Lynx AH9s
  - HMS Ark Royal
    - 4 Sea King AsaC7s of Flight A 849 Naval Air Squadron
    - 5 Chinook HC2s of No. 18 Squadron RAF
  - HMS Ocean
    - 10 Sea King HC4s of 845 Naval Air Squadron
    - 6 Gazelle AH1 of 847 Naval Air Squadron
    - 6 Lynx AH7 of 847 Naval Air Squadron
  - Chinook Wing
    - No. 7 Squadron RAF
    - No. 18 Squadron RAF
    - No. 27 Squadron RAF
  - Puma Detachment
    - No. 33 Squadron RAF
  - Merlin detachment (1419 flt)
    - No. 28 Squadron RAF

=== Notes ===
When a battalion is referred to as a battlegroup, it is not purely made up of units from the parent unit, but is an integrated team, combining armoured units with tanks, and mechanised infantry with infantry fighting vehicles.

Also, whilst 16 Air Assault Brigade is apparently the only fighting brigade listed with its own organic helicopter support in this order of battle, 3 Commando Brigade had the helicopters on board Ocean and Ark Royal to call upon, and 7 Armoured Brigade wasn't really air mobile as a formation. There were also the RAF Pumas and Chinooks mentioned above for transport purposes.

Special Forces elements of the British Army (Special Air Service) and Royal Marines (Special Boat Service) were also deployed but as the British government policy is not to comment on special forces activity, the exact details or elements deployed are officially unconfirmed.

The contribution of reservists to the deployment (some 9,500 of the 46,000 personnel involved in the warfighting phase and its immediate aftermath, the vast majority from the Territorial Army, and in significant number in the subsequent roulements) is understated by the order of battle, as the only units to deploy in their entirety were 202 Field Hospital (with augmentees from the other TA Field Hospitals), 131 Independent Commando Squadron of the Royal Engineers as well as A (Royal Wiltshire Yeomanry) Squadron, W (Westminster Dragoons) Squadron of the Royal Yeomanry and two platoons from 710 (Bath and Laundry) Squadron of 166 Supply Regiment RLC(v). The remainder were augmentees, called up individually from their units (which therefore do not feature in the order of battle) and employed to bring many of the units listed above up to their war-fighting strength.

Finally, 3 Commando Brigade had a United States Marine Corps unit, 15th MEU under its command in the initial stages of the war. This went back to American command around 25 March.

== Roulements ==
1st Armoured Division remained in theatre, controlling UK ground forces until June 2003, when 3rd Mechanised Division's HQ arrived in theatre to take command of British forces. From December 2003 a series of composite HQs were established.

=== 1st Roulement (Operation TELIC II) ===
From 11 July 2003 to 4 November 2003:

- Senior British military representative and deputy commanding general, Multinational Force, Iraq: Major-general Freddie Viggers (July 2003 to September 2003)
- Senior British military representative and deputy commanding general, Multinational Force, Iraq: Major-general Andrew Figgures (September 2003 to November 2003)
- GOC 3rd (UK) Mechanised Division: Major General Graeme Lamb (July 2003 to November 2003)
  - 3rd Mechanised Division Headquarters and Signal Regiment
  - 10 Field Squadron (Air Support), 39 Engineer Regiment
  - 3 Regiment, Royal Military Police
  - 3 Close Support Regiment, Royal Logistic Corps
  - 3 Close Support Medical Regiment, Royal Army Medical Corps
  - 5 Battalion, Royal Electrical and Mechanical Engineers
  - Elements of 5 Regiment Royal Artillery
  - Elements of 7 Signal Regiment
  - Elements of 14 Signal Regiment
  - Elements of 30 Signal Regiment
  - Elements of 4 General Support Regiment, Royal Logistic Corps
  - Elements of 4 General Support Medical Regiment, Royal Army Medical Corps
  - Elements of 52nd Lowland Regiment (Territorial Army)
  - Elements of East of England Regiment (Territorial Army)
  - Elements of Tyne-Tees Regiment (Volunteers)
  - 19 Mechanised Brigade
    - 19 Mechanised Brigade Headquarters and 209 Signal Squadron
    - 40 Regiment, Royal Artillery
    - 38 Engineer Regiment
    - 1st Battalion, The Queen's Lancashire Regiment
    - 1st Battalion, King's Own Scottish Borderers
    - 1st Battalion, The King's Regiment
    - 2nd Battalion, The Light Infantry
    - 1st Battalion, The Royal Green Jackets
    - Elements of The Light Dragoons
    - Elements of the Queen's Royal Lancers
    - Elements of 2nd Royal Tank Regiment
    - Elements of Royal Monmouthshire Royal Engineers (Militia)
- National Support Element
  - 101 Logistic Brigade
    - 101 Logistics Brigade Headquarters and Signal Squadron
    - 27 Transport Regiment,(attached 236 Squadron RLC(V)Royal Logistic Corps
    - 9 Supply Regiment, Royal Logistic Corps
    - 168 Pioneer Regiment, Royal Logistic Corps
    - 4 Regiment, Royal Military Police
    - 33 Field Hospital
    - Elements from 17 Port and Maritime Regiment, Royal Logistics Corps
    - Elements from 29 Regiment, Royal Logistic Corps
    - Elements from 11 Explosive Ordnance Disposal Regiment, Royal Logistic Corps
    - Elements from 1 Postal & Courier Service Group
    - 15 Field Support Squadron Royal Engineers Op Telic 2 & 3
- Maritime contribution
  - HMS Cardiff (handed over to HMS Richmond)
  - HMS Richmond (to July 2003)
  - HMS Sutherland (July 2003 – October 2003)
  - HMS Norfolk (October 2003 – March 2004)
  - HMS Kent
  - RFA Diligence
  - RFA Brambleleaf

=== 2nd Roulement (Operation TELIC III) ===
From: 4 November 2003 to 25 April 2004:

- Senior British military representative and deputy commanding general, Multinational Force, Iraq: Major-general Andrew Figgures (November 2003 to March 2004)
- Senior British military representative and deputy commanding general, Multinational Force, Iraq: Lieutenant-general John McColl (March 2004 to April 2004)
- GOC 3rd (UK) Mechanised Division: Major General Graeme Lamb (November 2003 to December 2003)
- GOC Multi-National Division (South-East): Major General Andrew Stewart (December 2003 to April 2004)
  - 16 Signals Regiment
  - Elements from 14 Signals Regiment
  - Elements from 30 Signals Regiment
  - 20 Armoured Brigade
    - 20 Armoured Brigade Headquarters and Signal Squadron
    - The Queen's Royal Hussars
    - 26 Regiment Royal Artillery
    - 35 Engineer Regiment
    - 1st Battalion, The Light Infantry
    - 1st Battalion, The Royal Regiment of Wales (24th/41st Foot)
    - 2nd Battalion, The Parachute Regiment
    - 1st Battalion, The Royal Scots (The Royal Regiment)
    - 1st Battalion, Argyll and Sutherland Highlanders (Princess Louise's)
    - Cambrai Company The London Regiment
    - Elements of 73 Engineer Regiment
    - Elements of the West Midlands Regiment
    - Elements of The Royal Rifle Volunteers
    - Elements of The East of England Regiment (Militia)
    - Elements of The 9th/12th Royal Lancers
    - Elements of Royal Monmouthshire Royal Engineers (Militia)
- National Support Element
  - 4 General Support Regiment, Royal Logistic Corps
  - 22 Field Hospital
  - Elements of 33 Engineer Regiment (Explosive Ordnance Disposal)
  - Elements of 1 Regiment, Royal Military Police
  - Elements of 10 Transport Regiment, Royal Logistic Corps
  - Elements of 11 Explosive Ordnance Disposal Regiment, Royal Logistic Corps
  - Elements of 17 Port & Maritime Regiment, Royal Logistic Corps
  - Elements of 23 Pioneer Regiment, Royal Logistic Corps
  - Elements of 24 Regiment, Royal Logistic Corps
  - Elements of 5 General Support Medical Regiment, Royal Army Medical Corps
  - 15 Field Support Squadron Royal Engineers Roulemented by 45 Field Support Squadron January 2004
- Maritime contribution
  - HMS Kent
  - HMS Norfolk (October 2003 – March 2004)
  - HMS Grafton (March 2004 – July 2004)
  - RFA Bayleaf

=== 3rd Roulement (Operation TELIC IV) ===
From 25 April 2004 to 1 November 2004:

- Senior British military representative and deputy commanding general, Multinational Force, Iraq: Lieutenant-general John McColl (April 2004 to October 2004)
- Senior British military representative and deputy commanding general, Multinational Force, Iraq: Lieutenant-general John Kiszely (October 2004 to November 2004)
- GOC Multi-National Division (South-East): Major General Andrew Stewart (April 2004 to July 2004)
- GOC Multi-National Division (South-East): Major General Bill Rollo (July 2004 to November 2004)
  - 16 Signals Regiment
  - Elements from 14 Signals Regiment
  - Elements from 30 Signals Regiment
  - Elements of 52nd Lowland Regiment (TA)
  - Messines Coy from the London Regiment (TA)
  - Elements of the Royal Yeomanry (TA)
  - Elements of the Lancastrian and Cumbrian Volunteers (TA)
  - Elements of the Royal Irish Rangers
  - Elements of 40 Commando Royal Marines
  - 1 Mechanised Brigade
    - 1 Mechanised Brigade Headquarters and Signal Squadron
    - 1st Regiment Royal Horse Artillery
    - 22 Engineer Regiment
    - Queen's Royal Lancers
    - 1st Battalion, The Princess of Wales's Royal Regiment
    - 1st Battalion, Royal Welch Fusiliers
    - 1st Battalion, 22nd (Cheshire) Regiment
    - 1st Battalion, Royal Highland Fusiliers (Princess Margaret's Own Glasgow and Ayrshire Regiment)
    - 1st Battalion, The Argyll and Sutherland Highlanders (Princess Louise's)
    - Elements of The Household Cavalry Regiment
    - Elements of the Honourable Artillery Company
    - Elements of The Rifle Volunteers
- National Support Element
  - 8 Transport Regiment, Royal Logistic Corps
  - 207 (V) Field Hospital relieved in 2004
  - UK Medical Group
    - 256 (City of London) Field Hospital (V)
    - Close Support Squadron, Royal Army Medical
  - Phoenix Battery, 32 Regiment, Royal Artillery Corps
  - Elements of 33 Engineer Regiment (Explosive Ordnance Disposal)
  - Elements of 1 Regiment, Military Police
  - Elements of 6 Supply Regiment, Royal Logistic Corps
  - Elements of 11 Explosive Ordnance Disposal Regiment, Royal Logistic Corps
  - Elements of 24 Regiment, Royal Logistic Corps
  - Elements of 29 Regiment, Royal Logistic Corps
  - Elements of Scottish Transport Regiment, Royal Logistic Corps (Volunteers)
  - Elements of 1 General Support Medical Regiment, Royal Army Medical Corps
  - Elements of 104 (V) Regiment, Royal Artillery
  - Elements of 6 Battalion, Royal Electrical and Mechanical Engineers
- Maritime contribution
  - HMS Grafton (March 2004 – July 2004)
  - HMS Somerset (July 2004 – November 2004)
  - HMS Echo
  - RFA Bayleaf

=== 4th Roulement (Operation TELIC V) ===
From 1 November 2004 to 30 April 2005:

- Senior British military representative and deputy commanding general, Multinational Force, Iraq: Lieutenant-general John Kiszely (November 2004 to April 2005)
- GOC Multi-National Division (South-East): Major General Bill Rollo (November 2004 to January 2005)
- GOC Multi-National Division (South-East): Major General Jonathon Riley (January 2005 to April 2005)
  - 4 Armoured Brigade
    - 4 Armoured Brigade Headquarters and Signal Squadron
    - 4th Regiment, Royal Artillery
    - P Battery, 5th Regiment, Royal Artillery
    - Phoenix Battery, 32 Regiment, Royal Artillery
    - 21 Engineer Regiment
    - Field Support Squadron, 28 Engineer Regiment
    - 1st The Queen's Dragoon Guards
    - The Royal Dragoon Guards
    - 1st Battalion, Scots Guards
    - 1st Battalion, Welsh Guards
    - 1st Battalion, the Duke of Wellington's Regiment (West Riding)
    - 1st Battalion, the Black Watch (Royal Highland Regiment) (detached from UK operational area from end of October 2004 to south-east of Baghdad to support 24th Marine Expeditionary Unit)
    - 40 Commando, Royal Marines
    - Elements of 115 Provost Company, 1st Regiment Royal Military Police
    - Elements of the Honourable Artillery Company
    - East and West Riding Regiment
- National Support Element
  - 1 Battalion REME
  - Elements of 7 Transport Regiment,
  - Elements of 101 Regiment Royal Artillery(V)
  - Royal Logistic Corps
  - Squadron from General Support Medical Regiment
- Maritime contribution
  - HMS Somerset (July 2004 – ?)
  - HMS Cumberland
  - HMS Echo
  - RFA Bayleaf
- Air Contribution
  - Detachment of No. 10 Squadron RAF
  - Detachment of No. 14 Squadron RAF
  - Detachment of No. 24 Squadron RAF
  - Detachment of No. 30 Squadron RAF
  - Detachment of No. 32 Squadron RAF
  - Detachment of RAF Kinloss Nimrod MR2 Wing
  - Joint Helicopter Force?Iraq
  - No. 51 Squadron RAF Regiment

=== 5th Roulement (Operation TELIC VI) ===
From 30 April 2005 to 31 October 2005:

- Senior British military representative and deputy commanding general, Multinational Force, Iraq: Lieutenant-general Robin Brims (April 2005 to October 2005)
- GOC Multi-National Division (South-East): Major General James Dutton (April 2005 to October 2005)
  - 12 Mechanised Brigade
    - 12 Mechanised Brigade Headquarters and Signal Squadron
    - 19th Regiment, Royal Artillery
    - Phoenix Battery, 32 Regiment, Royal Artillery
    - Surveillance and Target Acquisition Patrols Troop from the Honourable Artillery Company
    - 106 (Yeomanry) Regiment, Royal Artillery
    - 26 Engineer Regiment
    - Field Support Squadron, 28 Engineer Regiment
    - The King's Royal Hussars
    - The Light Dragoons
    - 1st Battalion, Coldstream Guards
    - 1st Battalion, the Royal Anglian Regiment
    - 1st Battalion, the Royal Regiment of Wales (24th/41st Foot)
    - 1st Battalion, the Staffordshire Regiment (The Prince of Wales's)
    - 1st Battalion, the Royal Irish Regiment (27th (Inniskillings), 83rd, 87th and The Ulster Defence Regiment)
    - East of England Regiment
    - Royal Rifle Volunteers
- National Support Element
  - 4 Battalion REME
  - 3 Close Support Regiment, Royal Logistic Corps
  - Squadron from General Support Medical Regiment
- Maritime Contribution
  - HMS Marlborough (July 2004 – March 2005)
  - HMS Argyll (March 2005 – August 2005)
  - HMS Echo (until May 2005)
  - HMS Scott
  - RFA Bayleaf
  - RFA Diligence
- Air Contribution
  - Detachment of No. 10 Squadron RAF
  - Detachment of No. 101 Squadron RAF
  - Detachment of No. 14 Squadron RAF
  - Detachment of No. 24 Squadron RAF
  - Detachment of No. 30 Squadron RAF
  - Detachment of No. 32 Squadron RAF
  - Detachment of RAF Kinloss Nimrod MR2 Wing
  - Joint Helicopter Force?Iraq
  - No. 34 Squadron RAF Regiment

=== 6th Roulement (Operation TELIC VII) ===
From 1 November 2005 to 9 May 2006:

- Senior British military representative and deputy commanding general, Multinational Force, Iraq: Lieutenant-general Nick Houghton (November 2005 to March 2006)
- Senior British military representative and deputy commanding general, Multinational Force, Iraq: Lieutenant-general Robert Fry (March 2006 to May 2006)
- GOC - Multi-National Division (South-East): Major General John Cooper (November 2005 to May 2006)
  - 7 Armoured Brigade
    - 7 Armoured Brigade Headquarters and Signal Squadron
    - Phoenix Battery, 32 Regiment, Royal Artillery
    - 3rd Regiment, Royal Horse Artillery
    - 32 Engineer Regiment
    - 9th/12th Royal Lancers (The Prince of Wales's)
    - 2nd Royal Tank Regiment
    - The Royal Scots Dragoon Guards (Carabiniers and Greys)
    - 2nd Battalion, The Parachute Regiment
    - 1st Battalion, The Highlanders (Seaforth, Gordons and Camerons)
    - 1st Battalion, The Royal Regiment of Fusiliers
    - 1st Battalion, The King's Own Royal Border Regiment
    - 4th Battalion, The Parachute Regiment
    - Cambrai Company The West Midlands Regiment
    - Royal Welsh Regiment
    - 1st Battalion, Royal Highland Fusiliers (Princess Margaret's Own Glasgow and Ayrshire Regiment)
  - National Support Element
    - 1st Battalion, The Royal Scots (The Royal Regiment)
    - 2 Battalion, REME
    - 2 Logistic Support Regiment, Royal Logistic Corps
    - 29 Close Support Medical Squadron
  - 35 Battery Royal Artillery
- Maritime Contribution
  - HMS Campbeltown (August 2005 – February 2006)
  - HMS St Albans (February 2006 – ?)
  - HMS Bulwark (February 2006 – ?)

=== 7th Roulement (Operation TELIC VIII) ===
From 10 May 2006 to 14 November 2006:

- Senior British military representative and deputy commanding general, Multinational Force, Iraq: Lieutenant-general Robert Fry (May 2006 to September 2006)
- Senior British military representative and deputy commanding general, Multinational Force, Iraq: Lieutenant-general Graeme Lamb (September 2006 to November 2006)
- GOC Multi-National Division (South-East): Major General John Cooper (May 2006 to July 2006)
- GOC Multi-National Division (South-East): Major General Richard Shirreff (July 2006 to November 2006)
  - 20 Armoured Brigade
    - 20 Armoured Brigade Headquarters and Signal Squadron (200)
    - 12th Regiment Royal Artillery
    - 33 Engineer Regiment
    - 35 Engineer Regiment
    - 1st The Queen's Dragoon Guards
    - The Queen's Royal Hussars
    - 1st Battalion, Grenadier Guards
    - 1st Battalion, The Princess of Wales's Royal Regiment (Queen's and Royal Hampshires)
    - 2nd Battalion, The Royal Anglian Regiment
    - 1st Battalion, The Devonshire and Dorset Light Infantry
    - 1st Battalion, The Light Infantry
    - Lancastrian and Cumbrian Volunteers
    - King's and Cheshire Regiment
    - 1 Logistic Support Regiment, Royal Logistic Corps
  - K (Hondeghem) Battery Royal Artillery
  - Elements of 5 General Support Medical Regiment, Royal Army Medical Corps

=== 8th Roulement (Operation TELIC IX) ===
From 14 November 2006 to June 2007:

- Senior British military representative and deputy commanding general, Multinational Force, Iraq: Lieutenant-general Graeme Lamb (November 2006 to June 2007)
- GOC Multi-National Division (South-East): Major General Richard Shirreff (November 2006 to January 2007)
- GOC Multi-National Division (South-East): Major General Jonathan Shaw (January 2007 to June 2007)
  - 19 Light Brigade
    - 19 Light Brigade Headquarters and Signal Squadron (209)
    - 40th Regiment Royal Artillery
    - 38 Engineer Regiment
    - The Queen's Royal Lancers
    - 1st Royal Tank Regiment - H Sqn
    - 2nd Royal Tank Regiment - EGYPT Sqn
    - 1st Battalion, The Yorkshire Regiment (PWO)
    - 2nd Battalion, The Duke of Lancaster's Regiment (King's Lancashire and Border)
    - 1st Battalion, The Royal Green Jackets (renamed 2nd Battalion, The Rifles 1 Feb 2007)
    - 1st Battalion, The Staffordshire Regiment (The Prince of Wales's)
    - 2nd Battalion, The Royal Regiment of Fusiliers
    - 2nd Battalion, The Light Infantry (renamed 3rd Battalion, The Rifles 1 Feb 2007)
    - The Black Watch, 3rd Battalion The Royal Regiment of Scotland
    - 19 Combat Service Support Battalion
  - P Battery (The Dragon Troop) Royal Artillery (composite troop)
  - L Troop Honourable Artillery Company
  - Alamein Coy (FP) 7th Battalion, Royal Regiment of Scotland, (51st Highland)

=== 9th Roulement (Operation TELIC X) ===
From June 2007 to December 2007:

- Senior British military representative and deputy commanding general, Multinational Force, Iraq: Lieutenant-general Graeme Lamb (June 2007 to July 2007)
- Senior British military representative and deputy commanding general, Multinational Force, Iraq: Lieutenant-general Bill Rollo (July 2007 to December 2007)
- GOC Multi-National Division (South-East): Major General Jonathan Shaw (June 2007 to August 2007)
- GOC Multi-National Division (South-East): Major General Graham Binns (August 2007 to December 2007)

Land component

- Headquarters, 1 Mechanised Brigade
- 215 Signal Squadron, Royal Signals
- Two squadrons from the Household Cavalry Regiment
- The King's Royal Hussars
- Two squadrons from the 2nd Royal Tank Regiment, Badger and Cyclops
- 1st Battalion, Irish Guards
- One company from 1st Battalion, The Royal Welsh
- 2nd Battalion, The Royal Welsh
- 4th Battalion, The Rifles
- 1st Regiment Royal Horse Artillery
- 22nd Engineer Regiment
- One squadron from 23rd Pioneer Regiment, Royal Logistic Corps
- 3rd Logistic Support Regiment, Royal Logistic Corps
- One company from 6th Battalion, Royal Electrical and Mechanical Engineers
- 3rd Close Support Medical Regiment, Royal Army Medical Corps
- 158 Provost Company, 3rd Regiment, Royal Military Police
- 22 Battery, 32nd Regiment, Royal Artillery
- 34th Field Hospital, Royal Army Medical Corps

Sea component

- HMS Cornwall
- HMS Enterprise
- RFA Bayleaf
- Two Mine Countermeasures vessels
- Contribution to the 60-man joint US-UK 'Naval Transition Team'

Air component

- 845 Naval Air Squadron (Sea King Mk 4)
- Detachment from 652 Squadron, Army Air Corps (Lynx)
- No. 1419 Flight RAF (Merlin)
- No. 1 Squadron RAF Regiment
- 4th Force Protection Wing
- No. 120 Squadron RAF/No. 201 Squadron RAF (Nimrod MR2)
- No. 51 Squadron RAF (Nimrod R1)
- 814 Naval Air Squadron (Merlin)
- No. 216 Squadron RAF (TriStar)
- No. 32 (The Royal) Squadron RAF (BAe 125/BAe 146)
- No. 617 Squadron RAF (Tornado GR4)
- No. 23 Squadron RAF/No. 30 Squadron RAF (C-130J Hercules)
- No. 101 Squadron RAF (VC10)

=== 10th Roulement (Operation TELIC XI) ===
From December 2007 to June 2008:

- Senior British military representative and deputy commanding general, Multinational Force, Iraq: Lieutenant-general Bill Rollo (December 2007 to March 2008)
- Senior British military representative and deputy commanding general, Multinational Force, Iraq: Lieutenant-general John Cooper (March 2008 to June 2008)
- GOC Multi-National Division (South-East): Major General Graham Binns (December 2007 to February 2008)
- GOC Multi-National Division (South-East): Major General Barney White-Spunner (February 2008 to June 2008)
  - 4 Mechanised Brigade
    - 4 Mechanised Brigade Headquarters and Signal Squadron (204)
    - The Royal Dragoon Guards
    - D Battery, 3rd Regiment, Royal Horse Artillery
    - K Battery, 5th Regiment, Royal Artillery
    - 21 Engineer Regiment
    - 1st Battalion, Scots Guards
    - The Royal Scots Borderers, 1st Battalion The Royal Regiment of Scotland
    - 1st Battalion, The Duke of Lancaster's Regiment (King's Lancashire and Border)
    - 1st Battalion, The Mercian Regiment (Cheshires)
    - 1st Battalion, Royal Electrical and Mechanical Engineers
    - 115 Provost Company
    - 1 (Close Support) Medical Regiment
    - 12 Logistic Support Regiment

2nd Battalion Royal Welsh I

=== 11th Roulement (Operation TELIC XII) ===
From June 2008 to December 2008:

- Senior British military representative and deputy commanding general, Multinational Force, Iraq: Lieutenant-general John Cooper (June 2008 to December 2008)
- GOC Multi-National Division (South-East): Major General Barney White-Spunner (June 2008 to August 2008)
- GOC Multi-National Division (South-East): Major General Andy Salmon (August 2008 to December 2008)
  - 7 Armoured Brigade
    - 7 Armoured Brigade Headquarters and Signal Squadron (207)
    - The Royal Scots Dragoon Guards (Carabiniers and Greys)
    - 1st Battalion, The Royal Regiment of Fusiliers
    - The Highlanders, 4th Battalion The Royal Regiment of Scotland
    - 2nd Battalion, The Royal Anglian Regiment
    - 3rd Regiment, Royal Horse Artillery
    - 32 Engineer Regiment
    - 2 Logistic Support Regiment
    - 3 (Close Support) Medical Regiment
    - 2nd Battalion, Royal Electrical and Mechanical Engineers
    - 111 Provost Company
    - Elements of 25/170 Bty, Royal Artillery
    - 9th/12th Royal Lancers
    - 617 Tactical Air Control Party

=== 12th Roulement (Operation TELIC XIII) ===
From December 2008 to 30 April 2009:

- Senior British military representative and deputy commanding general, Multinational Force, Iraq: Lieutenant-general John Cooper (December 2008 to March 2009)
- Senior British military representative and deputy commanding general, Multinational Force, Iraq: Lieutenant-general Chris Brown (March 2009 to April 2009)
- GOC Multi-National Division (South-East): Major General Andy Salmon (December 2008 to March 2009)
  - 20 Armoured Brigade
    - 20 Armoured Brigade Headquarters and Signal Squadron (200)
    - The Queen's Royal Hussars (Queen's Own and Royal Irish)
    - 1st Royal Tank Regiment - RHQ and T Sqn
    - 1st Battalion, The Princess of Wales's Royal Regiment (Queen's and Royal Hampshires)
    - 1st Battalion, The Yorkshire Regiment (14th/15th, 19th and 33rd/76th Foot) (Prince of Wales's Own)
    - 5th Battalion, The Rifles
    - 26 Regiment, Royal Artillery
    - 35 Engineer Regiment
    - 1 Logistic Support Regiment
    - 3rd Battalion, Royal Electrical and Mechanical Engineers
    - 110 Provost Company

== Aerial assets ==
- 847 Naval Air Squadron between October 2007 and February 2008 with the Lynx AH.9
- No. 651 Squadron, Army Air Corps between October 2004 and April 2009 with the Defender

== See also ==
- List of United Kingdom Military installations used during Operation Telic
