= Multi-National Division (South-East) (Iraq) =

- Active: 2003–2009
- Country: United Kingdom
- Type: Command
- Part of: Multi-National Corps – Iraq
- Garrison/HQ: Basra Airport

Multi-National Division (South-East) (MND (SE)) was a British commanded military division responsible for security in the south east of Iraq from 2003 to 2009. It was responsible for the large city of Basra (or Basrah), and its headquarters were located at Basra Airport. The division was initially responsible for the governorates (roughly provinces) of Al Muthanna, Maysan, Basra, and Dhi Qar. MND-SE was a subordinate division of Multi-National Corps Iraq. Multi-National Corps Iraq was itself part of Multi-National Force-Iraq.

== History ==
In the aftermath of the 2003 invasion of Iraq, which had the British codename 'Operation Telic,' the British 1st Armoured Division and 3rd Mechanised Division were successively responsible for the command and control of the occupation forces in south east Iraq. After the 3rd Mechanised Division's tour of duty came to an end it was replaced by a composite headquarters still known as MND (SE).

=== General officers commanding ===
- December 2003 – July 2004: Major-General Andrew Stewart, British Army
- July – November 2004: Major-General Bill Rollo, British Army
- December 2004 – June 2005: Major-General Jonathon Riley, British Army
- June – December 2005: Major-General James Dutton, Royal Marines
- December 2005 – July 2006: Major-General John Cooper, British Army
- July 2006 – January 2007: Major-General Richard Shirreff, British Army
- January – August 2007: Major-General Jonathan Shaw, British Army
- August 2007 – February 2008: Major-General Graham Binns, British Army
- February – August 2008: Major-General Barney White-Spunner, British Army
- August 2008 – March 2009: Major-General Andy Salmon, Royal Marines

Major General Andy Salmon (COMUKAMPHIBFOR) handed over command of the area to the U.S. 10th Mountain Division on 31 March 2009 and the division headquarters closed on that day. After a transfer of authority on 20 May 2009, the 34th Infantry Division, an Army National Guard Division from Minnesota commanded by Major General Richard C. Nash assumed control of the sector which would eventually redesignate to become U.S. Division-South in August 2009.

== Order of battle ==
In the months following the end of the invasion, the division expanded to include UK, Dutch, Norwegian, Italian, Japanese, Australian, NZ, Romanian, Danish, Portuguese, Czech and Lithuanian troops. As of February 2007, the Australians, Romanians, Danes, Czechs and Lithuanians remain (see Multinational Force in Iraq for further information). The UK itself had about 5,500 personnel serving in Iraq, separated into the following battlegroups, as of 1 June 2007:

=== Land component ===
- Headquarters, 1st Mechanised Brigade
- Messines & Cambrai Company from London Regiment (Force protection)
- 215th Signal Squadron, Royal Signals
- Two squadrons from the Household Cavalry Regiment
- Cassino Company, 4th Battalion The Parachute Regiment. ROBG (1 SCOTS+1RIR), B Coy Tyne Tees Regiment Green Howards
- The King's Royal Hussars
- Two squadrons from the 2nd Royal Tank Regiment
- 1st Battalion, Irish Guards
- One company from 1st Battalion, The Royal Welsh
- 2nd Battalion, The Royal Welsh
- 1st Regiment, Royal Horse Artillery
- 22nd Engineer Regiment
- One squadron from 23rd Pioneer Regiment, Royal Logistic Corps
- 3rd Logistic Support Regiment, Royal Logistic Corps
- One company from 6th Battalion, Royal Electrical and Mechanical Engineers
- 3rd Close Support Medical Regiment, Royal Army Medical Corps
- 158th Provost Company, 3rd Regiment, Royal Military Police
- 22nd Battery, 32nd Regiment, Royal Artillery
- 34th Field Hospital, Royal Army Medical Corps

=== Air component ===
- 845 Naval Air Squadron (Sea King Mk 4)
- Detachment from 652 Squadron, Army Air Corps (Lynx)
- No. 1419 Flight RAF (Merlin)
- No. 1 and 2 Squadrons RAF Regiment
- 4th Force Protection Wing
- No. 120 Squadron RAF/No. 201 Squadron RAF (Nimrod MR2)
- No. 51 Squadron RAF (Nimrod R1)
- 814 Naval Air Squadron (Merlin)
- No. 216 Squadron RAF (TriStar)
- No. 32 (The Royal) Squadron RAF (BAe 125/BAe 146)
- No. 617 Squadron RAF (Tornado GR4)
- No. 23 Squadron RAF/No. 30 Squadron RAF (C-130J Hercules)
- No. 101 Squadron RAF (VC10)

=== Maritime component ===
- HMS Cornwall
- HMS Enterprise
- RFA Bayleaf
- Two Mine Countermeasures vessels
- Contribution to the 60-man joint US-UK 'Naval Transition Team'

== See also ==
- Multinational Brigade South-East (Romania)
- List of United Kingdom Military installations used during Operation Telic
- Battle of Basra (2003)
- Multi-National Force troop deployment in Iraq 2003–2011
