= List of Old Guildfordians =

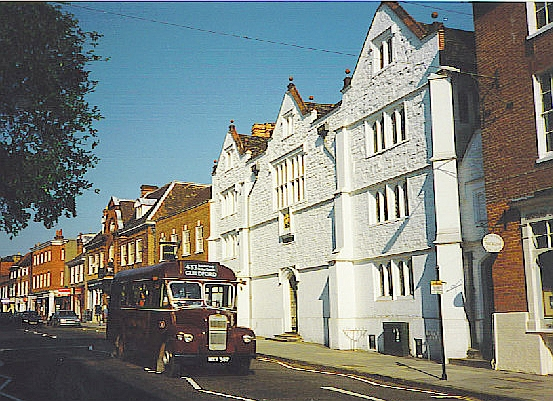
The Old Building in the upper High Street in 1997 with a vintage bus returning from a day trip

The Royal Grammar School (originally The Free School) is a selective English independent day school for boys in Guildford, Surrey. Its foundation dates to the death in 1509 of Robert Beckingham who left a provision in his will to "make a free scole at the Towne of Guldford"; in 1512 a governing body was set up to form the school. The school moved to the present site in the upper High Street after the granting of a royal charter from King Edward VI on 27 January 1553. The school became independent and fee paying on 1 September 1977, when the parents and staff raised sufficient funds to purchase it following concerns about the abolition of grammar schools and the introduction of comprehensive education. Initially the school educated 30 of the "poorest men's sons", however numbers have since grown to approximately 900 students, 300 of whom are in the sixth form.

Former pupils of the school are referred to as "Old Guildfordians" and are often referred to as "OGs" in official school correspondence. Since the school's founding, notable alumni have included the 75th Archbishop of Canterbury, Olympic athletes, the longest serving speaker of the House of Commons of the United Kingdom, several members of the parliament of the United Kingdom, a founding member of the East India Company and the 11th Premier of New Zealand.

== Old Guildfordians ==
Image	Name	Leaving year	Notes
George Abbot	George Abbot	1578	An English divine, who served as the 75th Archbishop of Canterbury and the fourth Chancellor of the University of Dublin. He also founded The Hospital of the Blessed Trinity, an alms house situated on the High Street in Guildford, Surrey.
—	Sir Maurice Abbot	—	A British merchant who was Lord Mayor of London in 1638. He was an original member of the East India Company and was involved in the settling of the colony of Virginia in 1624.
Robert Abbot	Robert Abbot	1577	An Anglican clergyman and brother of George Abbot. Robert was elected master of Balliol College, Oxford in 1609, and subsequently Bishop of Salisbury from 1615–17.
—	Tim Allan		Downing Street Director of Communications 2025–2026.
—	Sir John Allison	1961	Air Chief Marshal in the Royal Air Force, and Gentleman Usher to the Sword of State. He is invested as a Knight Commander of the Order of the Bath and invested as a Commander of the Order of the British Empire.
—	Gareth Bennett	1943	Anglican clergyman and academic who committed suicide in the wake of media reactions to an anonymous preface he wrote for Crockford's Clerical Directory.
Simon Bird	Simon Bird	2003	An actor, writer and comedian, who is best known for playing Will McKenzie in the BAFTA-winning TV comedy The Inbetweeners produced by Channel E4.
Jean-Jacques Burnel	Jean-Jacques Burnel	1968	Musician, producer, songwriter and bass guitarist with the British rock band The Stranglers.
—	John Rand Capron	c.1845	An English amateur scientist, astronomer and photographer. Though a solicitor by profession, he became an expert on spectroscopy, particularly in relation to the aurora, and published many articles during his lifetime.
Jack Clifford (rugby)	Jack Clifford (rugby)	2011	Jack Clifford (born 12 February 1993) is a rugby union player for the England national rugby union team and Aviva Premiership side Harlequins FC. He made his debut as a full England international in the Calcutta Cup match against Scotland on 6 February 2016. He is the RGS's first full England rugby international.
—	Leonard Colebrook	1896	An English physician and bacteriologist who introduced a number of measures to improve cleanliness in hospitals, and discovered the cure for puerperal fever.
—	Henry Cotton	c.1566	An English bishop, who became Bishop of Salisbury in 1598. He was also godson to Elizabeth I and one of her personal chaplains.
—	William Cotton	—	An English bishop, who became Bishop of Exeter in 1598.
—	John Derrick	c.1555	Queen's coroner for Surrey who made a legal deposition containing the first reference to cricket in the English language.
Lt.-Gen. Sir William Thomas Furse	Lt.-Gen. Sir William Thomas Furse	1883	Lieutenant-General in the British Army and Master-General of the Ordnance.
—	Sir Stephen Gaselee	c.1780	Judge. Justice of the Court of Common Pleas.
Lt.-Col. Henry Haversham Godwin-Austen	Lt.-Col. Henry Haversham Godwin-Austen	1851	English topographer, geologist and surveyor. First explorer of the second highest mountain on Earth, K2 (formerly Mt. Godwin-Austen).
Sir George Grey	Sir George Grey	1826	Soldier, explorer, Governor of South Australia, twice Governor of New Zealand, Governor of Cape Colony (South Africa), and the 11th Prime Minister of New Zealand.
Graham Gristwood	Graham Gristwood	2002	Orienteering world relay champion in 2008.
—	Professor Andrew D. Hamilton	1971	Former Provost of Yale University, Vice-Chancellor of University of Oxford.
Admiral Sir Edward Hamilton, 1st Baronet	Admiral Sir Edward Hamilton, 1st Baronet	c.1787	Admiral in the Royal Navy. Served during the American War of Independence, and the French Revolutionary and Napoleonic Wars.
—	Professor Peter Haynes	—	Head of Department at DAMTP University of Cambridge.
Robert Horne	Robert Horne	—	A leading Protestant reformist, and one of the Marian exiles who fled to the continent during the reign of Mary I of England. He was subsequently Bishop of Winchester.
Terry Jones	Terry Jones	1961	A Welsh comedian, screenwriter, actor and film director, known for his roles in the Monty Python's Flying Circus television series, and the film Monty Python's Life of Brian.
—	Lord Mark Kerr	1801	Admiral in the Royal Navy. Son of the fifth Marquess of Lothian.
Arthur Knight	Arthur Knight	—	Captain of England association football team & Olympic gold medalist in 1912.
—	Mark Lambert	2003	Harlequins and England U-21 rugby union international.
—	Geoff Laws	1975	Commonwealth Games Featherweight Weight Lifting Gold Medallist 1982. GB Olympic team 1980, 1984.
Evelyn Lintott	Evelyn Lintott	—	England association football international and Lieutenant in the British Army.
Admiral of the Fleet Sir Thomas Byam Martin	Admiral of the Fleet Sir Thomas Byam Martin	—	Admiral in the Royal Navy who served during both the French Revolutionary and Napoleonic Wars, who was credited for reforming and modernising the Royal Navy. He was also the Member of Parliament for Plymouth, but was dismissed as comptroller of the Navy by King William IV for criticising attempts to reduce the Navy budget.
Sir George More	Sir George More	—	Courtier and Member of Parliament.
—	Conway Lloyd Morgan	1869	Comparative psychologist and philosopher, Vice-Chancellor of University of Bristol.
Arthur Onslow	Arthur Onslow	1709	Politician and the longest serving Speaker of the House of Commons.
—	John Parkhurst	c.1525	An English Marian exile and subsequently Bishop of Norwich.
—	Robert Parkhurst	c.1585	English merchant who was elected Lord Mayor of London in 1635.
—	Maurice Pryce	1929	Wykeham Professor of Physics
James Purnell	James Purnell	1988	Member of the UK parliament and served in the Cabinet as Secretary of State for Work and Pensions and Secretary of State for Culture, Media and Sport.
—	John Rickman	1785	English government official and statistician who created the census in 1800.
—	James Edward Rogers	1855	Irish architect and artist
John Russell	John Russell	—	Painter and a member of the Royal Academy.
—	Philips Sales, Lord Sales	—	Justice of the Supreme Court of the United Kingdom
Major-General Andy Salmon	Major-General Andy Salmon	1975	Commandant General Royal Marines from June 2009 until February 2010.
—	Mackenzie Taylor	c.1996	A British comic, writer and director with bipolar schizoaffective disorder, who committed suicide in 2010 aged 32.
Martin Tyler	Martin Tyler	1964	An English football commentator with Sky Sports who was voted as the FA Premier League "Commentator of the Decade".
—	James Wicks	—	Chief Justice of Kenya.
—	Victor Willing	1945	A British painter, who attended the Slade School of Fine Art. His work was mainly abstract in style.
Bob Willis	Bob Willis	1968	England cricket captain, who is, as of 2024, England's fourth-highest wicket taker, behind James Anderson, Stuart Broad, and Ian Botham. Willis also worked as a Sky Sports cricket commentator with Botham.
—	Peter Zinovieff	c.1947	Founder of Electronic Music Studios.
—	Harry Grieve	2019	Chess International Master And Former British Chess Champion.

"—" indicates year of leaving is unknown.
