= British involvement in the Iraq War =

Operation Telic
- Part of Iraq War
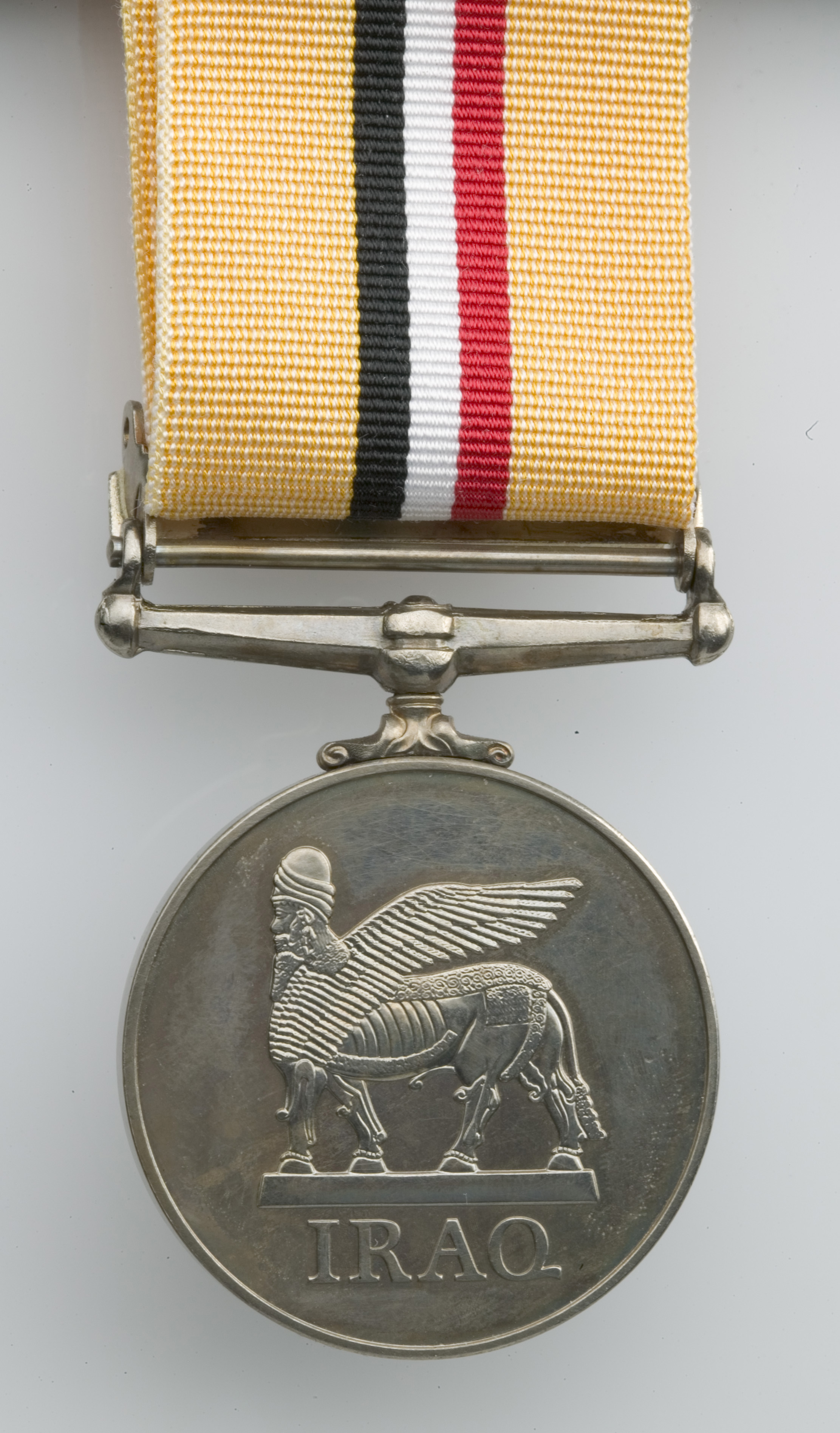
- Operation Telic Campaign Medal for Service in Iraq. The medal is made of cupro-nickel and bears on the obverse the crowned image of the Queen. The reverse shows an ancient Assyrian Lamassu sculpture above the word Iraq. The 1.5 inches (38 mm) wide ribbon is a sand colour with three central stripes of black, white and red, the three main colours of the Iraqi flag (minus the green of the Takbīr).
Date	19 March 2003 – 22 May 2011
Location	Iraq
Result	British victory: Southern Iraq occupied by British forces until withdrawal in mid-2009.; The mission was completed and the remaining British forces withdrew by 22 May 2011.

Belligerents
United Kingdom	Ba'athist Iraq; Iraqi Insurgents

Commanders and leaders
(United Kingdom) Tony Blair (United Kingdom) Brian Burridge	(Ba'athist Iraq) Saddam Hussein

Operation Telic (Op TELIC) was the codename under which all of the United Kingdom's military operations in Iraq were conducted between the start of the invasion of Iraq on 19 March 2003 and the withdrawal of the last remaining British forces on 22 May 2011. The bulk of the mission ended on 30 April 2009 but around 150 troops, mainly from the Royal Navy, remained in Iraq until 22 May 2011 as part of the Iraqi Training and Advisory Mission. 46,000 troops were deployed at the onset of the invasion and the total cost of war stood at £9.24 billion in 2010.

== Background ==
Operation Telic was the largest deployment of British forces since World War II. It was only approached in size by the 1991 Operation Granby deployment for the Gulf War and the 1956 Operation Musketeer Suez Crisis deployment. It was considerably larger than the 1982 Operation Corporate in the Falklands War, which saw around 30,000 personnel deployed and the Korean War, which saw fewer than 20,000 personnel deployed.

Some 9,500 of the British servicemen and women who deployed on Operation Telic for the invasion and its aftermath were reservists, from the Territorial Army, Royal Naval Reserve and from the Royal Auxiliary Air Force Regiment.

Notice that additional British forces were deploying to the region (large numbers of RAF personnel were already deployed in Kuwait, Turkey and elsewhere in the region on Operations Northern Watch and Southern Watch) was given in three separate Commons statements by Geoff Hoon Secretary of State for Defence. On 7 January, the deployment of Royal Navy and Royal Marines was announced. 20 January saw the land forces deployment announced and 6 February the Royal Air Force. They were ready in time for hostilities to start on 19 March. When compared with the deployment of forces prior to the Gulf War things proceeded a great deal faster, with the slowest deploying elements taking 10 weeks to get from base to combat readiness in the theatre.

The deployment used 64 British and foreign flagged merchant vessels.

Telic means a purposeful or defined action (from Greek τέλος, telos). Unlike the United States who called their equivalent military deployment Operation Iraqi Freedom, the Ministry of Defence uses a computer to generate its names so that they carry no overtly political connotations. The meaning was initially unknown but as initial planning took place over the Christmas 2002 period, the term became jokingly known amongst personnel as a backronym for Tell Everyone Leave Is Cancelled.

== Invasion of Iraq ==
The British contribution to the invasion of Iraq formed part of Operation Telic, the codename for British military operations in Iraq. By the beginning of the invasion, the United Kingdom had deployed approximately 46,000 personnel to the Persian Gulf region, including a substantial land force centred on 1st Armoured Division, as well as naval, air and special forces. The National Audit Office described the deployment as Britain's largest since the Second World War, involving the deployment and sustainment of 46,000 personnel and 15,000 vehicles. British forces were assigned a principal role in the coalition's southern campaign, with responsibility for securing the Al-Faw Peninsula, southern oil infrastructure, Umm Qasr and the Basra area, while the main American ground force advanced northwards towards Baghdad.

Coalition military operations began in March 2003. A limited American strike against Iraqi leadership targets in Baghdad preceded the wider air campaign, while coalition ground forces crossed into Iraq from Kuwait. The official British parliamentary chronology dates the beginning of military operations to 20 March, when simultaneous air and ground operations commenced. British forces were already involved in operations during the opening phase, and the subsequent large-scale campaign developed more rapidly than had initially been planned.

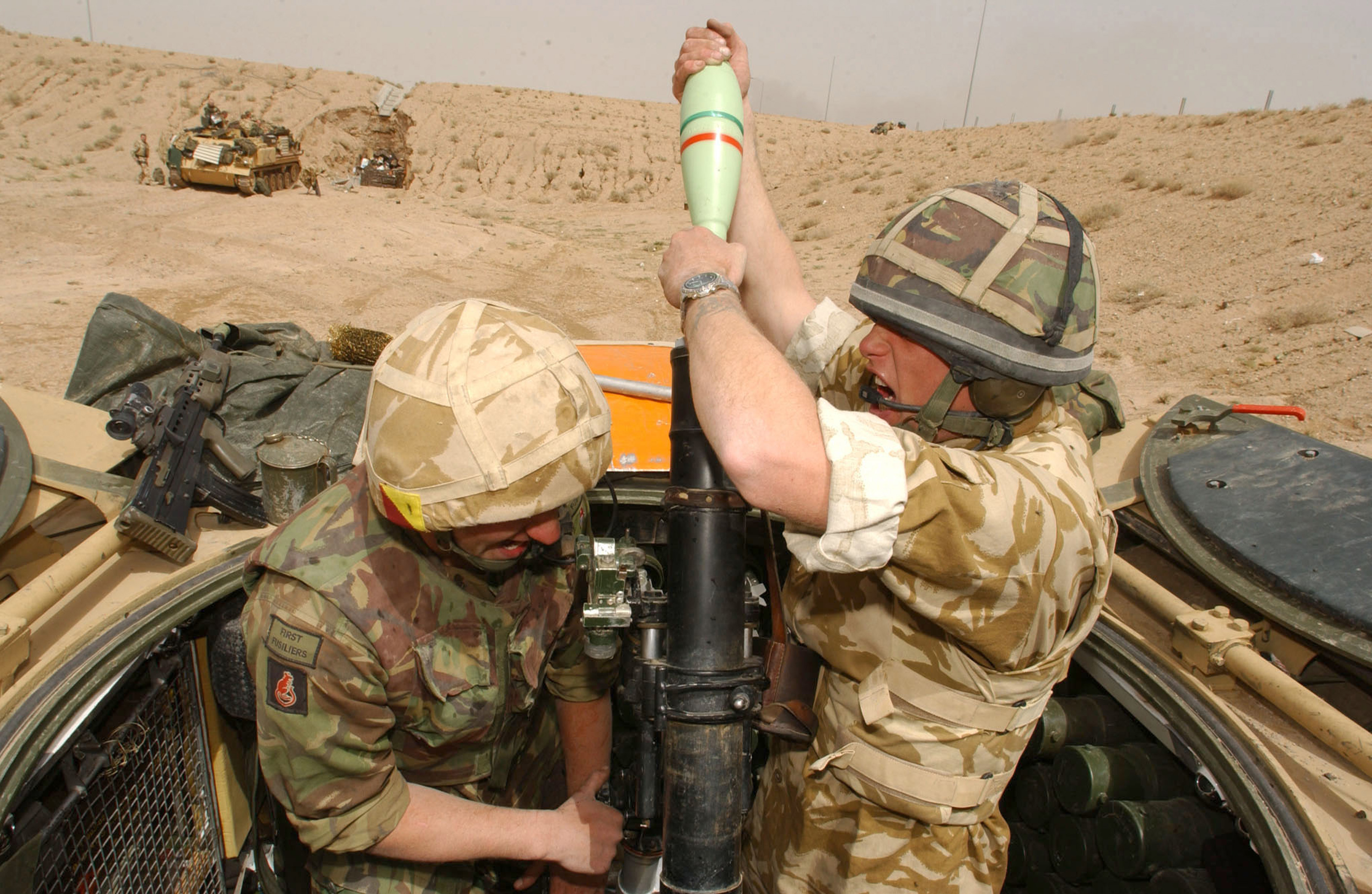
Soldiers of the 1st Armoured Division engaging Iraqi forces, 26 March 2003.

The southern campaign involved British and American forces operating alongside one another. 1st Armoured Division and the Royal Marines were assigned objectives in southern Iraq, while the United States Army's V Corps advanced towards Baghdad. British forces were therefore not simply following the American advance; they were responsible for a distinct operational area and for several objectives regarded as essential to the coalition campaign, particularly the protection of oil infrastructure and the capture of Iraq's principal southern port.

== Al-Faw Peninsula ==
One of the first British objectives was the Al-Faw Peninsula, a strategically important area at the northern end of the Persian Gulf. Coalition planners were concerned that Iraqi forces might destroy oil facilities or attempt to obstruct maritime operations. British operations therefore aimed to secure the peninsula and prevent damage to oil installations.

On 20 and 21 March, 3 Commando Brigade Royal Marines and other coalition forces conducted operations in the Al-Faw area. 42 Commando Royal Marines were deployed to a blocking position north of Al-Faw, while British naval vessels provided gunfire support. The operation formed part of a wider effort to secure the peninsula and the nearby oil infrastructure before Iraqi forces could destroy it.

British forces were also involved in securing the southern oilfields, including the Rumaila oilfields. Protecting Iraq's oil infrastructure was a major military and political objective during the opening stages of the invasion. British and American forces subsequently secured the principal southern oil facilities with far less damage than coalition planners had feared.

== Umm Qasr ==
Umm Qasr was one of the earliest objectives of the British-led southern campaign. The port was of considerable strategic importance because coalition planners intended to use it to bring humanitarian supplies and military logistics into southern Iraq. At 04:30 on 21 March, coalition ground forces, including elements under the command of 3 Commando Brigade, began operations to seize Umm Qasr and the nearby naval base.

The capture of the town did not immediately make the port operational. Iraqi resistance continued in the surrounding area, while the waterways leading to Umm Qasr had to be cleared of mines and other hazards. The Royal Navy therefore began mine-clearance operations in the Khawr Abd Allah waterway. According to the Iraq Inquiry, the port's opening was regarded as essential for the rapid delivery of humanitarian assistance and military supplies.

British naval forces played a major role in this operation. The Royal Navy contributed mine counter-measures vessels, amphibious shipping, escorts and submarine-launched Tomahawk cruise missiles to Operation Telic. Its role in clearing the approaches to Umm Qasr was particularly significant, since the port could not be used until safe access had been established.

== Invasion of Basra ==
While operations continued around Umm Qasr and Al-Faw, British forces advanced towards Basra, Iraq's second-largest city. By 24 March, according to the Iraq Inquiry, British forces controlled Basra Airport and were positioned around the outskirts of the city. The question of when and how to enter Basra became one of the principal operational decisions facing the British command.

The British did not immediately launch a full-scale assault into the centre of Basra. Instead, the city was surrounded and isolated while British forces engaged Iraqi military positions and attempted to weaken the regime's control over the area. Iraqi regular forces, Ba'ath Party loyalists and Fedayeen Saddam fighters continued to resist. The presence of irregular and paramilitary forces complicated British operations, as resistance was not confined to conventional defensive positions.

During this period, British forces conducted raids and armoured attacks against Iraqi positions around the city. The campaign was supported by artillery and coalition air power. British troops gradually increased their freedom of movement around Basra, while Iraqi forces suffered from deteriorating command, control and morale.

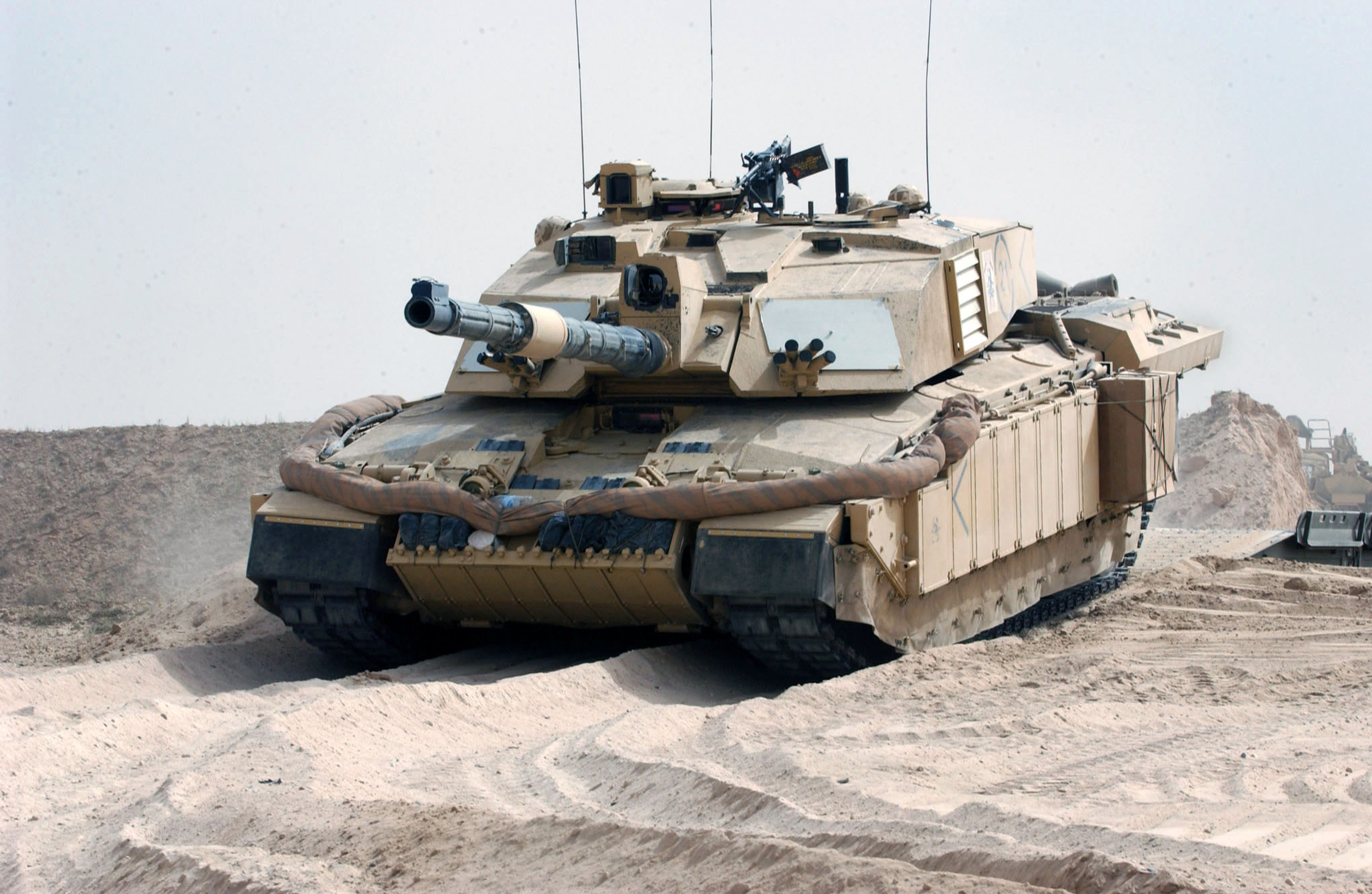
A Challenger 2 crosses into Iraq, 21 March 2003.

The final British assault on Basra began on 6 April. Elements of 7th Armoured Brigade, supported by other British units, entered the city after nearly two weeks of operations around its outskirts. Challenger 2 tanks, Warrior infantry fighting vehicles and Royal Marines took part in the advance. British forces attacked and occupied important regime positions, including the Ba'ath Party headquarters.

The fighting was more limited than a full-scale urban battle, although British forces encountered pockets of resistance. Three British soldiers were killed during the operation. Contemporary reports from the battle recorded British troops encountering Iraqi fighters armed with small arms and rocket-propelled grenades, particularly around the College of Literature and other defended positions.

By the end of 6 April, the Iraqi regime's organised control of the city had largely collapsed. British commanders nevertheless continued to warn that this did not mean Basra was completely secure. While British armoured units were able to move through much of the city, Ba'ath Party loyalists, Fedayeen fighters and other armed groups remained capable of resistance.

British forces subsequently consolidated control of Basra. The fall of the city was the culmination of Britain's principal conventional ground operation of the invasion and established the British military presence that would remain in southern Iraq after the collapse of Saddam Hussein's government.

== Air and naval operations ==
British participation in the invasion was not limited to the land campaign. The Royal Air Force contributed aircraft to the coalition air campaign, conducting offensive and support operations against Iraqi military targets. RAF Tornado aircraft were among the British aircraft used during Operation Telic, while the wider British air contribution included reconnaissance, transport and air-to-air refuelling.

The Royal Navy also made a substantial contribution. Approximately 9,000 naval personnel participated in the campaign. British amphibious forces transported and supported 3 Commando Brigade, while Royal Navy vessels provided naval gunfire support during the opening operations in southern Iraq. British submarines also launched Tomahawk cruise missiles against targets in Iraq.

Mine warfare was another major naval responsibility. The clearance of the Khawr Abd Allah waterway enabled access to Umm Qasr, allowing the port to become a major logistical and humanitarian entry point. The naval campaign therefore combined strike operations, amphibious warfare, mine clearance and the protection of coalition maritime forces and supply routes.

== End of the conventional campaign ==
By early April, British forces had achieved their principal objectives in southern Iraq. Umm Qasr and its port had been secured, the Al-Faw Peninsula and major oil infrastructure were under coalition control, and Basra had fallen to British forces. The rapid collapse of Saddam Hussein's government elsewhere in Iraq brought the main conventional phase of the invasion to an end. Baghdad fell to American forces on 8 and 9 April, and Tikrit fell on 13 April. Major combat operations were formally declared over on 1 May 2003.

The end of conventional warfare did not end Britain's military involvement. British forces remained in southern Iraq and assumed responsibility for security in an area centred on Basra. The British role consequently shifted from conventional combat operations towards occupation, security, and stabilisation. This transition proved considerably more difficult than coalition planning had anticipated and eventually developed into a prolonged counter-insurgency and peace-support campaign.

== Post-invasion ==
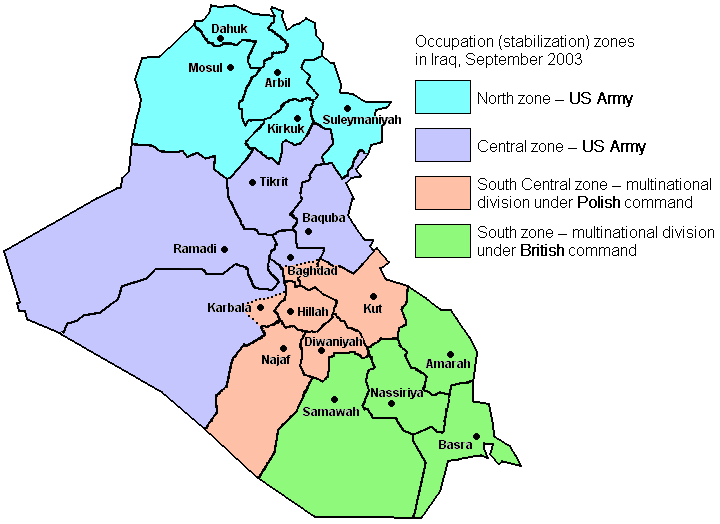
Occupation zones of Iraq after the invasion.

On 11 July 2003, 1st Armoured Division handed control over south-east Iraq to 3rd Mechanised Division, Major General Wall was succeeded by Major General Graeme Lamb as commander of British ground forces in Iraq. Unlike the invasion period, by then there was a substantial presence from many nations other than America, Britain, Australia and Poland. In addition to British troops, 3rd Division now commanded Italian, Dutch, Danish, Czech, Lithuanian, Norwegian, and New Zealand forces. 3rd Division handed over a new composite divisional headquarters on 28 December 2003. Major General Andrew Stewart took over from General Lamb as commander of British forces.

After the end of major operations, the main components of the British forces changed greatly. 3 Commando Brigade was withdrawn in early May and 16 Air Assault Brigade left later in the same month apart from a couple of infantry battalions. 7 Armoured Brigade remained until relieved by 19 Mechanised Brigade at the same time as 3rd Division took over from 1st Division. 102 Logistics Brigade was relieved by 101 Logistic Brigade in late May. Most of the RAF aircraft left the area with a few retained for patrols over Iraq and support of ground forces. British naval forces also returned to more usual levels, with two surface combatants, a tanker and a repair ship present in early July.

A further rotation of ground troops occurred in November 2003, with 19 Mechanised Brigade relieved by 20th Armoured Brigade; 20th Armoured Brigade in its turn being relieved by 1 Mechanised Brigade. In April 2004, 20th Armoured Brigade turned over its responsibilities to 1 Mechanised Brigade and Lieutenant General John McColl was appointed deputy commander of occupation ground forces. By July 2004 the British area saw its fifth commander when Major General Bill Rollo took over. At the end of 2004 General Rollo was succeeded by Major General Jonathan Riley and in November of that year 4 Armoured Brigade rotated to replace 1 Mechanised Brigade.

In May 2005, 4 Armoured Brigade was replaced by 12 Mechanised Brigade with the handover of responsibility taking place on 30 May.

In May 2006 7th Armoured Brigade, the Desert Rats were relieved by 20th Armoured Brigade under the command of Brigadier James Everard.

October 2006 saw 19 Light Brigade take over from 20th Armoured Brigade.

1 Mechanised Brigade provided HQ and troops for Op TELIC 10, deploying to Iraq in June 2007. During that tour, both the PJCC and Basra Palace were handed back to Iraqi control. They handed over to 4th Mechanised Brigade on 1 December 2007.

== Command structure ==
The force was commanded by a three-star tri-service headquarters. The commander of the operation was Air Marshal Brian Burridge, with Major General Peter Wall acting as his chief of staff. The headquarters was situated at CENTCOM headquarters in Qatar. The three services each had two-star commanders leading operations. Major General Wall took over command of 1st Armoured Division on 1 May 2003. He was replaced as Chief of Staff by Major General Barney White-Spunner.

The Royal Navy commander was Rear Admiral David Snelson who had his headquarters ashore in Bahrain. The afloat Royal Navy commander was Commodore Jamie Miller, who had the aircraft carrier HMS Ark Royal as his flagship. Rear Admiral Snelson was succeeded by Major General Tony Milton, Commandant General Royal Marines as maritime forces commander on 16 April 2003.

The 1st Armoured Division was commanded by Major General Robin Brims. Three army brigades were assigned to the division. 16 Air Assault Brigade was commanded by Brigadier 'Jacko' Page, 7th Armoured Brigade by Brigadier Graham Binns and 102nd Logistic Brigade by Brigadier Shaun Cowlam. 3 Commando Brigade was under the operational command of the division and was commanded by Brigadier Jim Dutton.

The Royal Air Force commander was Air Vice-Marshal Glenn Torpy.

== Equipment ==
The conflict saw over 100 fixed-wing aircraft and over 100 rotary-wing aircraft of virtually every type in the British inventory deployed. It also saw a 33 ship fleet, which was the largest taskforce deployed by the UK since the Falklands War. Some 120 Challenger 2 main battle tanks, 150 Warrior infantry fighting vehicles, 32 L131 self-propelled 155 mm howitzers, and 36 L118 105 mm towed howitzers were deployed with the land forces, with reconnaissance vehicles, and everything else that makes a modern mechanised and armoured force function.

During the post invasion phase, and following a number of British casualties blamed on inadequate equipment, a great deal of new equipment was purchased to help deal with the threats posed by insurgents. These included 166 armoured Pinzgauer Vector PPVs, 108 Mastiff PPVs, 145 enhanced FV430 Mk3 Bulldogs, Lockheed Martin Desert Hawk UAVs, and 8 Britten-Norman Defender ISTAR aircraft.

== Casualties ==
A total of 179 British Armed Forces personnel died serving on Operation Telic between the start of the campaign in March 2003 and the end of operations in July 2009; 136 in hostile incidents and the remaining 43 under non-hostile circumstances. Full non-fatal casualty records are currently only available for the period after 1 January 2006. From that date, 3,598 British personnel were wounded, injured or fell ill (315 wounded in action); 1,971 of whom required aeromedical evacuation. By 11 March 2007, more than 2,100.

In theatre both military and civilian casualties were treated by British Field Hospitals (FH), 22 FH in Kuwait and 34 FH in Iraq. 34 Field Hospital was made up of regular troops from their base in Strensall just outside York and members for volunteer reserve units from all over the country. A small 25 bedded hospital was sent across the Kuwait Iraq border in the early days of the war. On arrival at Shaibah the hospital was set up and ready to take casualties within six and a half hours. Everything that you would expect in a modern hospital was present with an Emergency Department, X-ray, Labs, Surgical Theatres x 2, ITU and a hospital ward.

In effect the hospital was based on the front line of the British area of responsibility and was the furthest forward medical unit in recent history. Casualties would often miss out the regimental aid posts and dressing stations and go straight to the hospital. Staff at the hospital worked 12 hour shifts without days off until more staff began to arrive around a month later.

The hospital took over 3500 casualties of which more than 350 were major trauma cases, and around 70 paediatric trauma cases. Injuries included blunt trauma, gun shot wounds, shrapnel injuries and severe burns.

== In fiction ==
The British television film The Mark of Cain depicted service of a fictional British Army unit, the 1st Battalion Northdale Rifles in Operation Telic, just after the end of combat operations and in the first stages of the occupation.

== See also ==
- List of British gallantry awards for the Iraq War
- List of British military installations used during the Iraq War
- Iraq Inquiry
