= Jonathon Riley (British Army officer) =

British Army general (born 1955)

Lieutenant General Jonathon Riley CB DSO
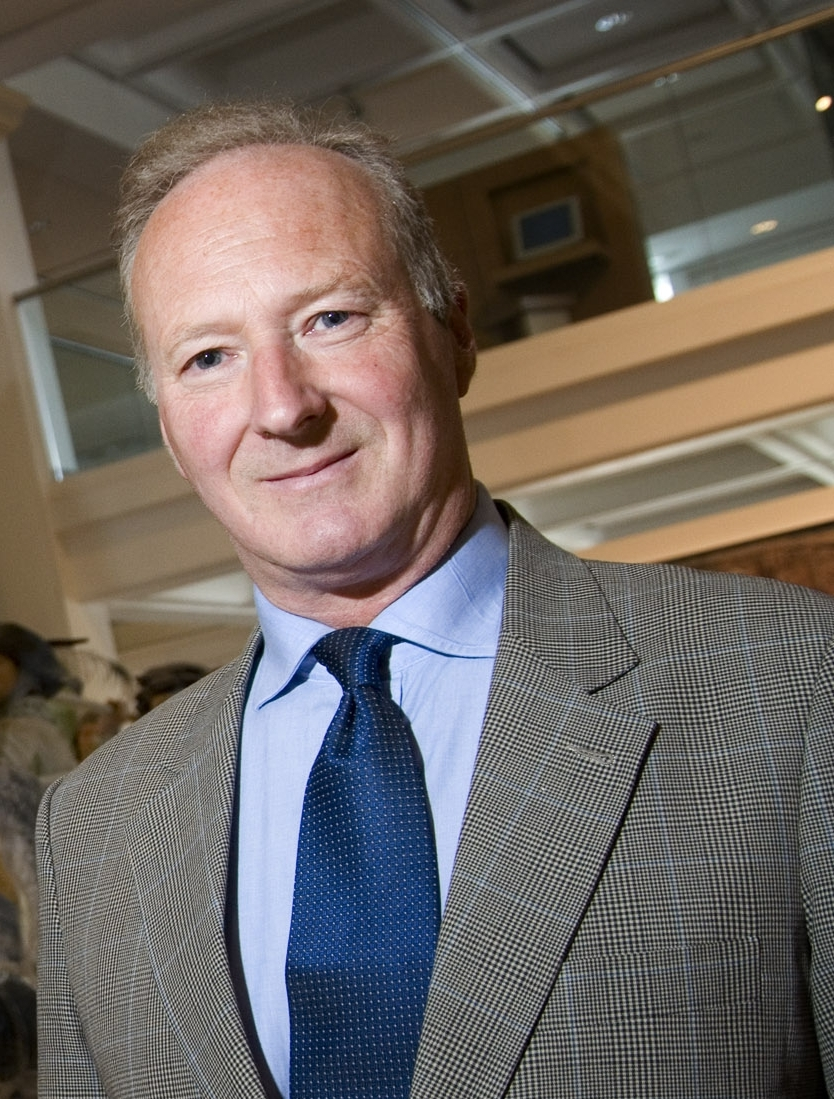
- Riley at the Royal Armouries Museum, 2009
- Born: 16 January 1955 (age 71)
- Military career
- Allegiance: United Kingdom
- Branch: British Army
- Service years: 1971–2009
- Rank: Lieutenant General
- Service number: 497496
- Unit: Royal Welch Fusiliers
- Commands: Deputy Commander, International Security Assistance Force; Multi-National Division (South-East); 1st Battalion, Royal Welch Fusiliers
- Conflicts: The Troubles; Sierra Leone Civil War; Iraq War; War in Afghanistan
- Awards: Companion of the Order of the Bath; Distinguished Service Order; Queen's Commendation for Valuable Service; Legion of Merit (United States); NATO Meritorious Service Medal
- Other work: Defence and Security consultant, author and military historian
- Website: generalship.org/index.html

Lieutenant General Jonathon Peter Riley, CB, DSO (born 16 January 1955) is a retired British Army officer and military historian.

== Military career ==
Riley joined the British Army as an officer cadet in 1971, and was commissioned into the Queen's Regiment in 1974. He was promoted to lieutenant on 9 March 1976, to captain on 9 September 1980 and, having attended the Staff College, Camberley, in 1987, he was promoted to major at the end of the year. During this time he saw active service in Northern Ireland.

Promoted to lieutenant colonel in 1993, Riley undertook a tour as an instructor at the Staff College, Camberley, that year. He was deployed as commanding officer of the 1st Battalion the Royal Welch Fusiliers to the Muslim enclave of Goražde in 1995 under a mandate to ensure the Serbs did not violate the NATO ultimatum. The Army of Republika Srpska attacked the town without warning, capturing 33 soldiers under Riley's command and several hundred other fellow United Nations peacekeepers in May. Having halted the initial Serb attack, the battalion handed over the defence of the enclave to the Bosnian 81st Division. During the siege that followed, protocol was broken when, first, the Director of Military Operations, then the Chief of the General Staff, and, finally, Prime Minister John Major telephoned Riley to be briefed on the situation. The enclave was successfully defended and unlike Srebrenica and Zepa it never fell to the Serbs; the 33 Fusiliers and fellow UN peacekeepers were later rescued safely. Riley was awarded the Distinguished Service Order for gallantry and distinguished services in the Former Republic of Yugoslavia in 1996, and promoted to full colonel in July 1997.

Promoted to brigadier on 31 December 1998, Riley became commander of the 1st Mechanised Brigade in Bosnia in 1999 and commander of the UK Joint Task Force in Sierra Leone in 2000. He was awarded the Queen's Commendation for Valuable Service for his service in Sierra Leone. He became Deputy Commandant of the Staff College and Director of the Higher Command and Staff Course in 2001.

Riley was deployed as Deputy Commanding General of the Coalition Military Advisory and Training Team in Iraq in May 2003 and then became Commanding General Multi-National Division (South East), Iraq and GOC British Forces in November 2004 with promotion to major general. In 2005, he was awarded the United States' Legion of Merit for his service in Iraq.

Riley served as Colonel of the Royal Welch Fusiliers, from 2006 to 2007. On 18 December 2007, he was promoted to the rank of lieutenant general and appointed deputy commander of the International Security Assistance Force in Afghanistan. He was awarded the NATO Meritorious Service Medal by the Secretary-General of NATO and, having been appointed Companion of the Order of the Bath in the 2008 New Year Honours, he transferred to the reserve on 15 September 2009.

On 14 December 2009, Riley gave evidence to The Iraq Inquiry, in which he stated that British troops had not expected to be faced with an insurgency and also defended the decision to disband the Iraqi Army after the invasion. Then, in February 2011, he gave evidence at the trial of Radovan Karadžić at the International Criminal Tribunal for the former Yugoslavia in The Hague on the incident in May 1995 when his troops had been held in captivity.

== Later life ==
Riley was appointed Director General and Master of the Royal Armouries, Britain's national collection of arms and armour, early in September 2009. Subsequently, he was appointed Visiting Professor in War Studies at King's College London. Riley gave up his Visiting Professor status and severed all ties with KCL in 2025 following a negative reception from students and a heated classroom disagreement in which he expressed his anti-immigrant views, suggesting immigrants be expelled from the UK to make room for defence spending.

Riley joined the UK Independence Party (UKIP) in 2012. He said he "believed passionately that we had to regain our national sovereignty, the control of our laws and our borders, and escape the unelected, unaccountable tyranny of the EU Commission." He later left the party, arguing it had "lost its way" and stating that he disagreed with the views of those who had taken charge at the time.

Riley is Chairman of the board of Veterans for Britain, an organisation with the aim "to put forward the Defence and Security arguments for the UK to vote to leave the European Union" and following the referendum to "Support Her Majesty's Government in the task of restoring full sovereign control to all aspects of the defence of the Realm in accordance with that mandate of the people."

On 19 January 2021, Riley re-joined UKIP, and was selected as the lead candidate for UKIP for the Mid and West Wales region of the Senedd for the 2021 election. He was not elected to the Senedd, although he received 3,731 votes.

== Works ==
Riley has written and edited a number of books on military history, including:

- History of the Queen's, 1959–1970. 1984.
- Riley, Jonathon P. (1987). From Pole to Pole: Life of Quintin Riley, 1905–80. Bluntisham Books. ISBN 1871999030.
- Riley, Jonathon P. (1998). From Pole to Pole: Life of Quintin Riley, 1905–80, revised second edition. Bluntisham Books. ISBN 1871999030.
- The Monitor Mission in the Balkans (1992)
- Soldiers of the Queen: The History of the Queen's Regiment 1966–1992 (1993) ISBN 0-948251-65-4 OCLC 29634690
- White Dragon: The Royal Welch Fusiliers in Bosnia (editor) (1995)
- Napoleon and the World War of 1813 (2000) ISBN 0714648930
- Regimental Records of The Royal Welch Fusiliers, Vol. VI 1945–1969 and Vol. VII 1970–2000 (2001)
- The Life and Campaigns of General Hughie Stockwell: From Norway, Through Burma, to Suez (2007)
- Napoleon as a General: Command from the Battlefield to Grand Strategy (2007)
- That Astonishing Infantry: The History of the Royal Welch Fusiliers 1689–2006 (2008) ISBN 1-84415-653-2 OCLC 176923405; second edition 2017
- Decisive Battles: From Yorktown to Operation Desert Storm. Continuum. 2010. ISBN 978-1-847-25250-0. OCLC 503647436.
- Up to Mametz – and Beyond. 2010.; second edition 2021
- A Matter of Honour. The Life, Campaigns and Generalship of Isaac Brock. Robin Brass Studio. 2011. ISBN 978-1-896-94165-3. OCLC 701589968.; second edition 2012
- 1813: Empire at Bay. The 6th Coalition and the Downfall of Napoleon. Praetorian. 2013. ISBN 978-1-783-03397-3. OCLC 851390748.
- The Last Ironsides: The English Expedition to Portugal, 1662–1668. Helion and Company. 2014. ISBN 978-1-909-98220-8. OCLC 884859822.; second edition 2015; paperback edition 2017
- The First Colonial Soldiers: A Survey of British overseas territories and their garrisons, 1650–1714. Volume 1: The British Isles, Europe, Asia and Africa (co-authored with Wienand Drenth). Drenth Publishing. 2014. ISBN 978-90-818887-2-1.
- The First Colonial Soldiers: A Survey of British overseas territories and their garrisons, 1650–1714. Volume 2: The Americas and the Caribbean (co-authored with Wienand Drenth). Drenth Publishing. 2015. ISBN 978-90-818887-3-8.
- Oft in Danger: the Life and Campaigns of General Sir Anthony Farrar-Hockley. Helion and Company. 2015. ISBN 978-1910777251.
- Regimental Records of The Royal Welch Fusiliers, Volume V, Part One, November 1918 – May 1940 (co-authored with Peter Crocker and Richard Sinnett). Helion & Company. 2019.
- Regimental Records of The Royal Welch Fusiliers, Volume V, Part Two, May 1940 – 1945 (co-authored with Peter Crocker and Richard Sinnett). Helion & Company. 2019.
- 'Ghosts of Old Companions'. Lloyd George's Welsh Army, the Kaiser's Reichsheer and the Battle for Mametz Wood 1914–1916. Helion & Company. 2019.
- Winning Wars. The Enduring Nature and Changing Character of Victory from Antiquity to the 21st Century [Ed Mattahias Strohn], two chapters. Casemate. 2021.
- The Colonial Ironsides. English Expeditions under the Commonwealth and Protectorate 1650 – 1660. Helion & Co. 2022.
- From Pole to Pole: Life of Quintin Riley, 1905–80, revised and expanded third edition. Golden Duck. 2022. ISBN 978-1871999037.
- Stormproofing [Ed Andrew Stewart, CHACR], chapter on Generals and Generalship. Casemate. 2025.
- Regimental Records of The Royal Welch Fusiliers, Volume VIII, 2001 - 2014, with Supplement 1689 - 2014. Helion & Company. 2025.

Military offices
Preceded by Bill Rollo	General Officer Commanding; Multi-National Division (South East), Iraq; 2004–2005	Succeeded by James Dutton
New title	Deputy Commander, ISAF; 2008–2009	Succeeded by Sir James Dutton
Cultural offices
Preceded by Paul Evans	Master of the Armouries; 2009–2013	Succeeded by Edward Impey
