= Jonathan Shaw (British Army officer) =

British Army general

Major General Jonathan Shaw CB CBE
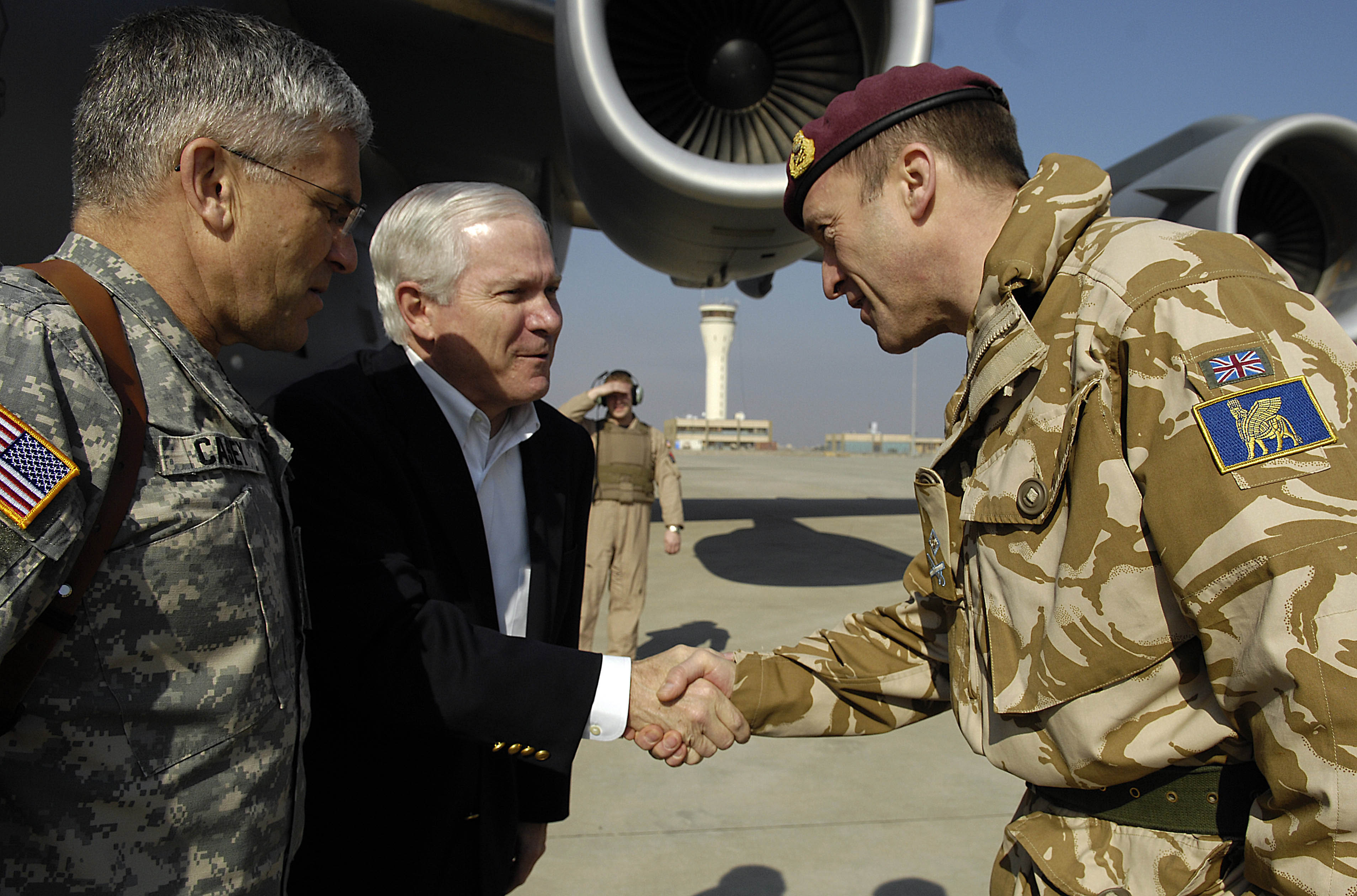
- Shaw (right) shaking hands with US Secretary of Defense Robert M. Gates in Basra, Iraq, 19 January 2007
- Born: 22 November 1957 (age 68); Leeds, West Yorkshire
- Military career
- Allegiance: United Kingdom
- Branch: British Army
- Service years: 1981–2012
- Rank: Major General
- Commands: Multi-National Division (South-East); Director Special Forces; Multi-National Brigade (Centre); 12th (Mechanized) Brigade; 2nd Battalion, Parachute Regiment
- Conflicts: Falklands War; The Troubles; Kosovo War; Iraq War
- Awards: Companion of the Order of the Bath; Commander of the Order of the British Empire

Major General Jonathan David Shaw, CB, CBE (born 22 November 1957) is a retired British Army officer.

== Military career ==
Educated at Sedbergh School and Trinity College, Oxford, where he studied Philosophy, Politics, and Economics, Shaw was commissioned into the Parachute Regiment in 1981. He was a platoon commander with 3rd Battalion, Parachute Regiment during the Falklands War. Having attended the Staff College, Camberley, between 1989 and 1990, he was appointed commanding officer of the 2nd Battalion, Parachute Regiment in 1997.

After attending the Higher Command and Staff Course at the Joint Services Command and Staff College in 2000, Shaw was made commander of the 12th (Mechanized) Brigade in 2002, and subsequently commanded the Multi-National Brigade (Centre) in Kosovo. He was appointed Director Special Forces in 2003, and having attended the Royal College of Defence Studies in 2006, he became General Officer Commanding Multi-National Division (South-East) in Iraq in January 2007 and went on to be chief of staff at HQ Land Forces in September 2007. He became Assistant Chief of Defence Staff (International Security Policy) in March 2009 and Assistant Chief of Defence Staff (Global Issues) in January 2011. His responsibilities include Chemical Biological Radiological & Nuclear Policy, Arms Control and Counter Proliferation and Cyber.

Shaw was appointed a Companion of the Order of the Bath in the 2012 Birthday Honours. He retired from the army in 2012.

== Family ==
Shaw is married to Gillie, a partner in a firm of lawyers; they have two children.

== Publications ==
- Shaw, Jonathan (16 October 2014). Britain in a Perilous World: The Strategic Defence and Security Review We Need. Haus Publishing. ISBN 978-1908323811.

Military offices
Preceded by Graeme Lamb	Director Special Forces; 2003–2006	Succeeded by Adrian Bradshaw
Preceded by Richard Shirreff	General Officer Commanding; Multi-National Division (South East), Iraq; January–August 2007	Succeeded by Graham Binns
