= No. 1419 Flight RAF =

No. 1419 Flight RAF

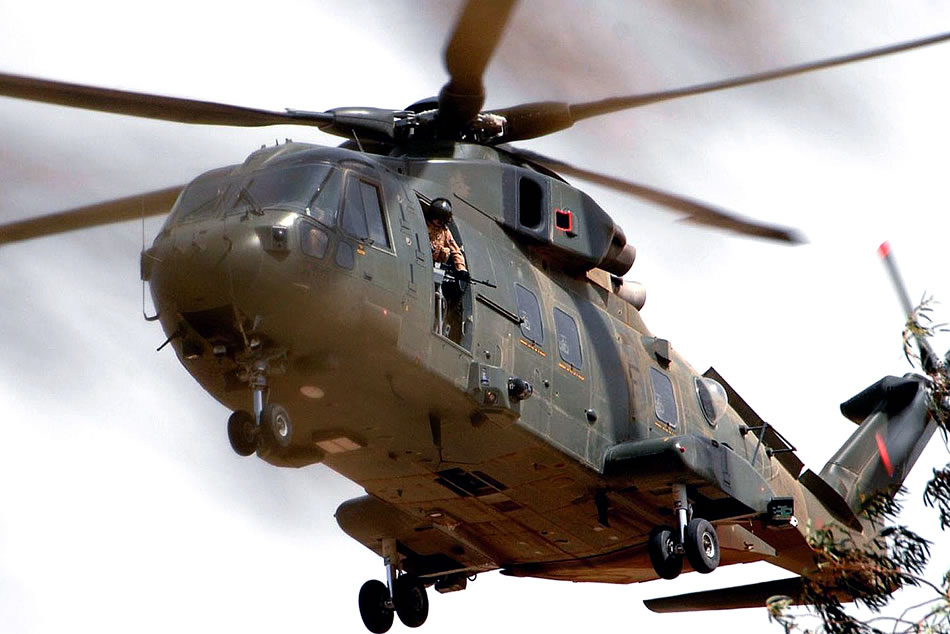
- A No. 1419 (Tactical Support) Flight AgustaWestland Merlin HC.3 landing at Al Fao, Iraq, 29 September 2008
- Active: 21 August 1940 – 25 August 1941; 5 March 2005 - May 2013.
- Role: Special Duties; Tactical Support
- Garrison/HQ: RAF North Weald; RAF Stradishall; RAF Newmarket; COB Basra, Iraq; Camp Bastion, Afghanistan
- Equipment: Westland Lysander I Armstrong Whitworth Whitley V Martin Maryland; AgustaWestland Merlin HC.3

No. 1419 (Tactical Support) Flight RAF was a flight within the Royal Air Force.

== History ==
=== Second World War ===
No. 419 (Special Duties) Flight was formed at RAF North Weald on 21 August 1940. It moved to RAF Stradishall where it was disbanded to form No. 1419 (Special Duties) Flight on 1 March 1941, continuing to fly Westland Lysander aircraft, Armstrong Whitworth Whitley bombers and Martin Maryland reconnaissance bombers on Special Operations Executive clandestine operations. The flight was disbanded at RAF Newmarket on 25 August 1941 to form No. 138 Squadron RAF which continued flying clandestine support missions for the remainder of World War II.

=== Iraq War ===
No. 1419 (Tactical Support) Flight RAF was resurrected at Basra, Iraq from elements of No. 28 Squadron RAF and No. 78 Squadron RAF from RAF Benson flying AgustaWestland Merlin HC.3 helicopters in support of Operation Telic as part of Joint Helicopter Force (Iraq) until the British drawdown in Iraq, the flight then being relocated to Afghanistan, in support of Operation Herrick.

=== Afghanistan ===
The flight was relocated to Camp Bastion as part of Joint Helicopter Force (Afghanistan) in 2009.

The flight was disbanded in May 2013 when the aircraft were returned to the UK.
