= Robert Fry =

Royal Marines general (born 1951)

Lieutenant General Sir Robert Fry KCB CBE
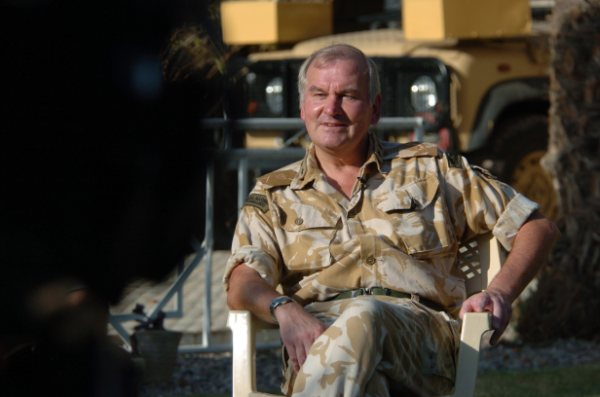
- Lieutenant General Sir Robert Fry (self-portrait taken in Baghdad 2007)
- Born: 6 April 1951 (age 75)
- Military career
- Allegiance: United Kingdom
- Branch: Royal Marines
- Service years: 1973–2007
- Rank: Lieutenant General
- Commands: Royal Marines; 3 Commando Brigade; 45 Commando
- Conflicts: Gulf War; Kosovo War; Iraq War
- Awards: Knight Commander of the Order of the Bath; Commander of the Order of the British Empire; Mentioned in Despatches; Legion of Merit (United States)

Lieutenant General Sir Robert Alan Fry, KCB, CBE (born 6 April 1951) served as a Royal Marine for over 30 years and was involved in military operations in Northern Ireland, the Gulf, Kosovo, Iraq and Afghanistan. After retirement from military service he went into private business and, in 2007, became CEO of Hewlett Packard's defence and security business in Europe, the Middle East and Africa. In 2010 he was appointed chairman of McKinney Rogers International and subsequently, in 2011, Albany Associates.

== Early career ==
After taking a degree in economics at the University of Bath and working for a period in commerce in New York City, Fry joined the Royal Marines in 1973. His early career was spent at regimental and special duties. Attendance at the Army Staff College was followed by tours in the Ministry of Defence and Directorate of Special Forces, a sequence punctuated in the 1986/7 academic year when he studied for an MA (Distinction) in War Studies at King's College London.

== Senior military career ==
In 1989, Fry was appointed Chief of staff, HQ 3 Commando Brigade, and subsequently took part in Operation Haven in Northern Iraq. This was followed by a return to the Ministry of Defence before taking command of 45 Commando in 1995. In 1997, in the rank of brigadier, he became the Director of Naval Staff Duties in the Ministry of Defence, after which he took over command of 3 Commando Brigade in 1999 and deployed to Kosovo (CBE).

He was appointed Commandant General Royal Marines in 2001, and a year later he took up the job of Commander United Kingdom Amphibious Forces, in which capacity he deployed as the UK Maritime Component Commander for operations in the Gulf.

He assumed the post of Chief of Staff at the Permanent Joint Headquarters in Northwood in May 2002 and remained in the job throughout the planning for and conduct of operations against Iraq. He took over the job of Deputy Chief of the Defence Staff (Commitments) in July 2003.

In 2004, the Chiefs of Staff Committee (COS) directed Fry to develop a plan to support NATO and switch British forces from Iraq to Afghanistan, where they had been involved since 2001. The plan had to accommodate the difficulty of concurrent operations in two theatres but was judged necessary in order to prevent a failure of the Alliance and the loss of Southern Afghanistan to Taliban control.

He was deployed as Senior British Military Representative and Deputy Commanding General, Multinational Force, Iraq in March 2006 and retired in 2007.

== Later career ==
From July 2007 to March 2010, Fry served as CEO of HP Enterprise Services Defence & Security UK, where he ran HPs $1.5 billion Europe, Africa and Middle East defence business. In January 2010 he was appointed chairman of the business consultancy McKinney Rogers International and in 2011 became chairman of Albany Associates. He remains an advisor to HP and a number of other companies in the defence and banking sectors.

Fry is an established essayist and occasional columnist. He is also a visiting professor at Reading University, a visiting fellow at Oxford University and a visiting professor at King's College London Department of War Studies. He is also a member the Royal United Services Institute executive council and a trustee of Help for Heroes.

== Awards ==
Early on in his career Fry was Mentioned in Despatches and appointed a Member of the Order of the British Empire. Later on he was appointed a Commander of the Order of the British Empire for services as commander of a multinational brigade in Kosovo in 1998. In July 2003, he was appointed a Knight Commander of the Order of the Bath for his services as Director of Operations in the MoD, and was made Officer of the United States' Legion of Merit in 2006 for his final operational tour as Deputy Commanding General of coalition forces in Iraq. In 2012 he became the first non US recipient of the USMC Semper Fidelis award and in 2014 received an honorary doctorate (LLD) from the University of Bath.

== Family ==
He is married to Liz and they have two daughters. He maintains his military links as colonel of the Special Reconnaissance Regiment, and is a Freeman of the City of London and Liveryman of the Worshipful Company of Plaisterers.

Military offices
Preceded by Robert Fulton	Commandant General Royal Marines; 2001–2002	Succeeded by Anthony Milton
Preceded by Sir Anthony Pigott	Deputy Chief of the Defence Staff (Commitments); 2003–2006	Succeeded by Sir Charles Style
Preceded by Nick Houghton	Senior British Military Representative and Deputy Commanding General, Multinational Force, Iraq; March 2006 – September 2006	Succeeded by Graeme Lamb
