= Richard Shirreff =

British Army general

General Sir Richard Shirreff KCB CBE
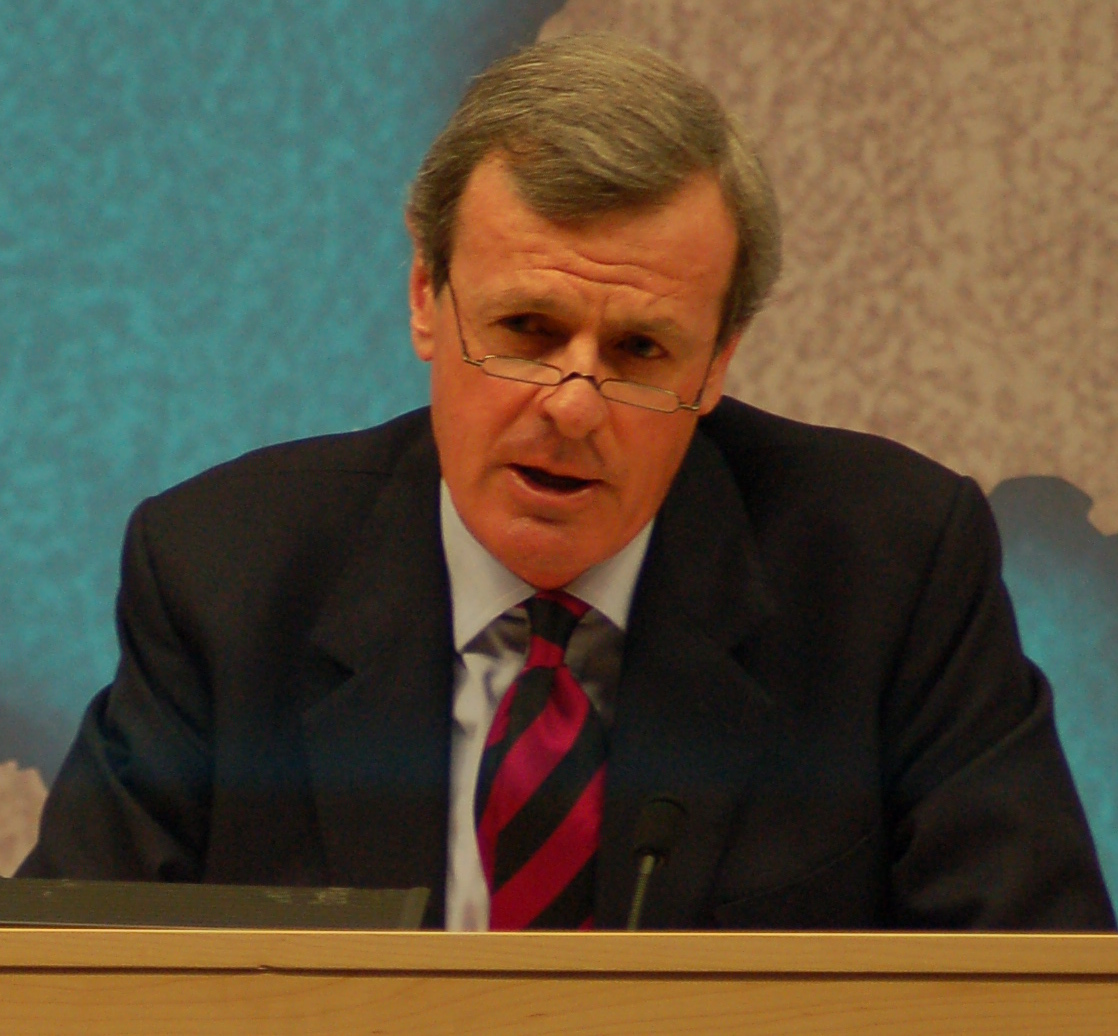
- General Sir Richard Shirreff in 2010
- Born: Alexander Richard David Shirreff; 21 October 1955 (age 70); Kenya Colony
- Military career
- Allegiance: United Kingdom
- Branch: British Army
- Service years: 1976–2014
- Rank: General
- Commands: Deputy Supreme Allied Commander Europe; Allied Rapid Reaction Corps; 3rd Mechanised Division; 7th Armoured Brigade; King's Royal Hussars
- Conflicts: The Troubles; Gulf War; Iraq War
- Awards: Knight Commander of the Order of the Bath; Commander of the Order of the British Empire; Queen's Commendation for Valuable Service

General Sir Alexander Richard David Shirreff, KCB, CBE (born 21 October 1955) is a retired senior British Army officer and author. From March 2011 to March 2014 he served as Deputy Supreme Allied Commander Europe.

== Early and personal life ==
Shirreff was born in Kenya, the son of Alexander David Shirreff MC of the 5th Battalion King's African Rifles. He was educated at Oundle School, at that time an all-boys private school in Northamptonshire.

Shirreff was commissioned into the 14th/20th King's Hussars as a second lieutenant on probation (university cadetship) on 3 September 1976. While sponsored through university by the British Army, he studied modern history at Exeter College, Oxford (BA, MA). He was confirmed as a second lieutenant on probation and as a second lieutenant (seniority from 1 February 1974) on 18 June 1977 and simultaneously promoted to lieutenant from the same date (seniority from 1 February 1976).

== Military career ==
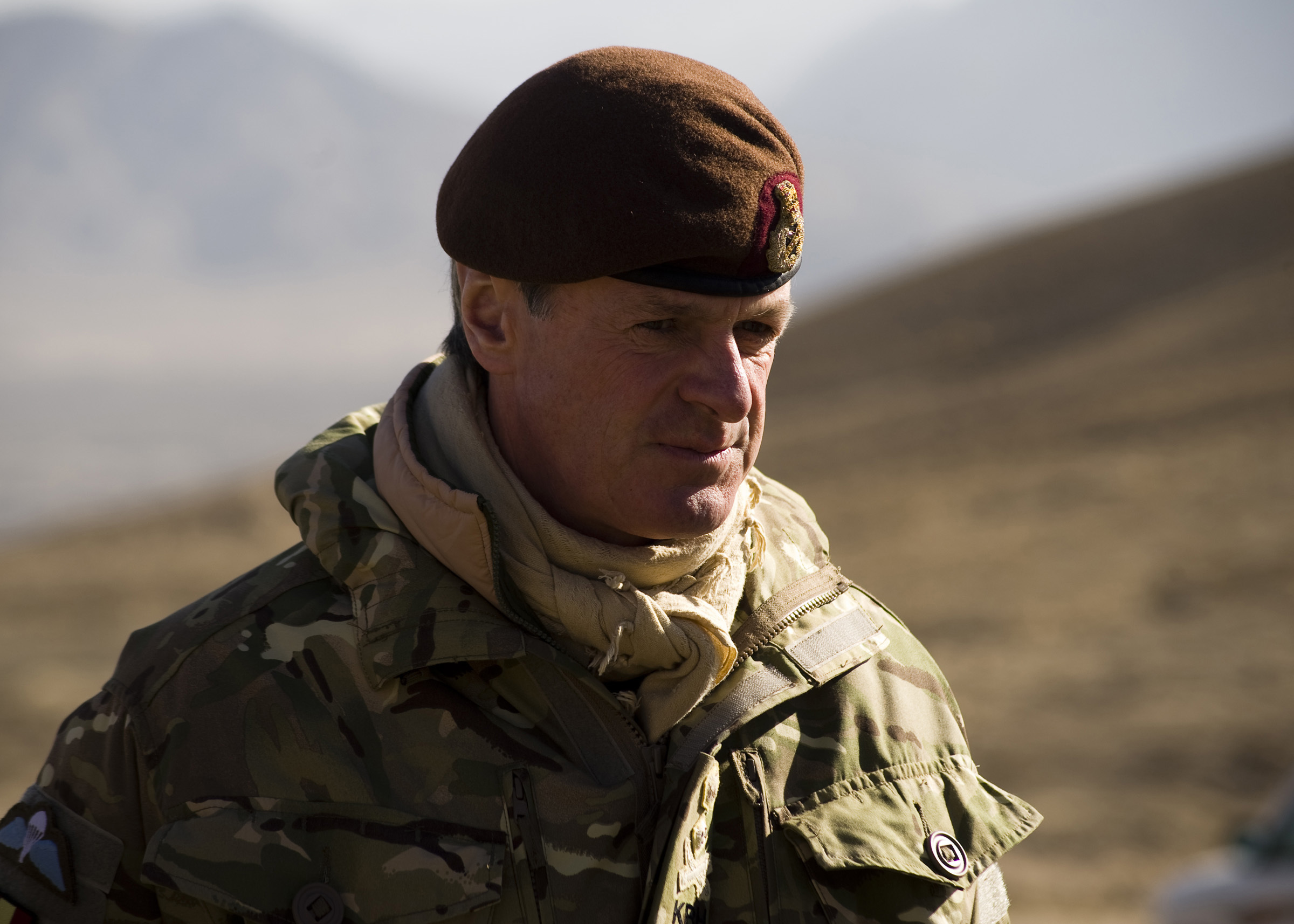
Lt Gen Shirreff visiting Afghanistan in 2011 as Deputy Supreme Allied Commander Europe

Shirreff was promoted to captain on 1 August 1980, and to major on 30 September 1987. Having seen active service during the Gulf War in 1991, Shirreff was promoted to lieutenant colonel on 30 June 1992, and was appointed commanding officer of the King's Royal Hussars in 1994. He deployed with his Regiment to Northern Ireland in 1995, for which Shirreff was awarded a Queen's Commendation for Valuable Service. Promoted to colonel – Army Plans at the Ministry of Defence on 30 June of the following year, he was advanced to brigadier on 30 June 1998. He was appointed Commander of 7th Armoured Brigade, which was deployed to Kosovo, and was made a Commander of the Order of the British Empire (CBE) in April 2001 in recognition of his service.

Shirreff was promoted to major general on 9 May 2003 and became Chief of Staff at Land Command and in 2005 he became General Officer Commanding 3rd (UK) Mechanised Division, which deployed as HQ Multinational Division South East in Iraq in July 2006. In January 2007 he was appointed Commander of the Allied Rapid Reaction Corps, and was promoted to lieutenant general on 13 December of that year. Shirreff was knighted as a Knight Commander of the Order of the Bath (KCB) in the 2010 New Year Honours.

On 11 January 2010, Shirreff gave evidence to the Iraq Inquiry. On 4 March 2011, he became Deputy Supreme Allied Commander Europe and was promoted to full general. He retired from that post in March 2014.

Shirreff is currently the honorary colonel of Oxford University OTC and served as the Honorary Colonel to the Royal Wessex Yeomanry from 2005 to 2015. He also served a term as Colonel Commandant (Cavalry) of the Royal Armoured Corps from 2004 and as Colonel of the Kings Royal Hussars from 2012 to 2017.

== Post-military career ==
Shirreff is an Advisory Board member of the non-for profit security organisation Genderforce, aiming to fight and prevent acts of Sexual and Gender Based Violence in conflict and post-conflict situations. He is a founding partner of Strategia Worldwide, a risk management consultancy founded in 2016.

In 2016, Shirreff published a book entitled 2017: War with Russia: An Urgent Warning from Senior Military Command. The part-fictional book suggests that Russia could easily invade the Baltic States, that war between Russia and NATO would be possible, and implies strongly that Shirreff finds military high command and government incapable of creating a suitable response. It also alleges that former Secretary of State for Defence, Philip Hammond, tried to court-martial him when he spoke up on British defence cuts.

Shirreff's commentaries on foreign militaries, such as his assessment on the strategic weaknesses of Russia's armed forces, have been distributed by news agencies such as Times Radio.

== Advisory role in Ukraine (2026) ==
On 15 April 2026, Shirreff was appointed chair of the newly established ARES Military Expert Council (Allied Reform and Expert Support), an international advisory body operating under the Commander-in-Chief of the Armed Forces of Ukraine Oleksandr Syrskyi. The body was created by the General Staff of the Armed Forces of Ukraine to support institutional reforms within the Armed Forces of Ukraine and to facilitate the exchange of advanced Ukrainian and international military experience.

On 22 April 2026, Syrskyi held the first working meeting with members of the council in Kyiv, during which he briefed them on the operational situation along the front line of the Russo-Ukrainian War. At the same meeting, Shirreff was additionally appointed as Syrskyi's chief foreign military adviser.

Military offices
Preceded by Graeme Lamb	General Officer Commanding the 3rd (UK) Mechanised Division; 2005–2007	Succeeded by Barney White-Spunner
Preceded by John Cooper	General Officer Commanding; Multi-National Division (South East), Iraq; 2006–2007	Succeeded by Jonathan Shaw
Preceded by Sir David Richards	Commander Allied Rapid Reaction Corps; 2007–2011	Succeeded by James Bucknall
Preceded by Sir John McColl	Deputy Supreme Allied Commander Europe; 2011–2014	Succeeded by Sir Adrian Bradshaw
