= Bill Rollo =

British Army officer (born 1955)

Lieutenant General Sir Bill Rollo KCB CBE
- Born: August 1955; London, England
- Military career
- Allegiance: United Kingdom
- Branch: British Army
- Service years: 1978–2013
- Rank: Lieutenant General
- Nickname: "Bill"
- Service number: 504027
- Commands: Force Development and Training; Multinational Division South East; 4th Armoured Brigade; Household Cavalry Regiment
- Conflicts: Bosnian War; Kosovo War; Iraq War
- Awards: Knight Commander of the Order of the Bath; Commander of the Order of the British Empire

Lieutenant General Sir William Raoul Rollo, KCB, CBE (born August 1955) is a former senior British Army officer.

== Military career ==
Rollo was commissioned as a second lieutenant (on probation) in the Territorial and Army Volunteer Reserve on 10 March 1977. He was then granted a short service commission, as a University Candidate, in the Blues and Royals on 4 September that year. His commission was subsequently confirmed and he was promoted to lieutenant, with seniority from 4 September 1975. He was promoted to captain on 4 March 1980, and to major on 30 September 1987. On 30 June 1992, he was promoted to lieutenant colonel. In 1994 he became commanding officer of the Household Cavalry Regiment and was deployed to Bosnia as part of the United Nations Protection Force.

Rollo was promoted to colonel on 30 June 1996. In 1998 he was appointed commander of the 4th Armoured Brigade, which was deployed to Macedonia and then to Kosovo.

Rollo was promoted to brigadier on 31 December 1998, with seniority from 30 June. He was appointed a Commander of the Order of the British Empire in the 2000 New Year Honours, and made aide-de-camp to Queen Elizabeth II on 1 November 2000, relinquishing the appointment on 28 June 2002.

Rollo was deployed as General Officer Commanding Multi-National Division (South East), Iraq in July 2004 and became Assistant Chief of the General Staff in January 2005. In July 2007 he was deployed again – this time as Senior British Military Representative and Deputy Commanding General, Multinational Force, Iraq.

Rollo was appointed Adjutant-General to the Forces in March 2008. Then, in December 2009, he was made Commander Force Development and Training, and in 2010 he was made Deputy Chief of the Defence Staff (Personnel and Training). He was appointed a Knight Commander of the Order of the Bath in the 2010 New Year Honours.

Between 2013 and 2023 Rollo was vice-chairman of the Commonwealth War Graves Commission.

In 2023, Rollo was made chair of trustees for The Tank Museum.

Military offices
Preceded by Andrew Stewart	General Officer Commanding; Multi-National Division (South East), Iraq; July – November 2004	Succeeded by Jonathon Riley
Preceded by David Richards	Assistant Chief of the General Staff; 2005–2007	Succeeded by Simon Mayall
Preceded by Graeme Lamb	Senior British Military Representative and Deputy Commanding General, Multinational Force, Iraq; 2007–2008	Succeeded by John Cooper
Preceded by Sir Freddie Viggers	Adjutant General; 2008–2009	Succeeded by Mark Mans
New command	Commander Force Development and Training; 2009–2010	Succeeded by Paul Newton
Preceded by Peter Wilkinson	Deputy Chief of the Defence Staff (Personnel and Training); 2010–2013	Succeeded by Andrew Gregory
