= Graham Binns =

British army officer

Major General Graham Binns CBE DSO MC
- Military career
- Allegiance: United Kingdom
- Branch: British Army
- Service years: 1976–2010
- Rank: Major General
- Service number: 503083
- Commands: Joint Services Command and Staff College; 1st (UK) Armoured Division; 7th Armoured Brigade; 1st Battalion, Prince of Wales's Own Regiment of Yorkshire
- Conflicts: The Troubles; Bosnian War; Iraq War
- Awards: Commander of the Order of the British Empire; Distinguished Service Order; Military Cross

Major General Graham John Binns, CBE, DSO, MC is a retired British Army officer. Binns served as General Officer Commanding 1st (UK) Armoured Division and then Commandant Joint Services Command and Staff College. He had previously commanded the 7th Armoured Brigade (the "Desert Rats") during Operation Telic 1 when the brigade took Basra in southern Iraq. He is the Honorary Colonel of The Yorkshire Regiment.

== Early life ==
Graham Binns was educated at Hymers College in Hull.

== Military career ==
Binns was commissioned on 11 December 1976, into the General list. He was transferred to The Prince of Wales's Own Regiment of Yorkshire on 2 July 1977. He was promoted to lieutenant on 11 December 1978. He was further promoted to captain on 11 June 1983. With this regiment he saw service in Germany, Norway, and the United Kingdom.

Between 1986 and 1988, Binns served in the Ministry of Defence. He then attended the Canadian Forces Command and Staff College in Toronto in 1988, after which he was posted again to Northern Ireland, where he became Chief of Staff of 39th Infantry Brigade. He was promoted to major on 30 September 1989. He was appointed a Member of the Order of the British Empire in 1992 "in recognition of Meritorious service in Northern Ireland."

Binns returned to The Prince of Wales's Own Regiment of Yorkshire in 1992 to command an armoured infantry company, mounted in Warrior tracked armoured vehicles, with which he served a tour in Bosnia and participated in Operation Grapple. Binns was awarded the Military Cross "in recognition of gallant and distinguished services" during this deployment. In 1994, he spent some time as an exchange officer at the United States Army Infantry School at Fort Benning, Georgia. Binns was promoted to lieutenant colonel on 30 June 1995, and returned to Britain to join the Directing Staff at the Staff College, Camberley.

In January 1997, Binns returned once again to The Prince of Wales's Own Regiment of Yorkshire and participated in exercises in Kenya, Belize and Canada. It was during this time with the battalion that he once more saw service in Northern Ireland. In April 1999, Binns became Chief of Crisis Plans Branch, Headquarters Allied Forces Southern Europe and led the team responsible for NATO operational planning in the Balkans. He was promoted to colonel on 30 June 1999, with seniority from that date. He served as Chief of Staff at HQ KFOR, a NATO-led force under a United Nations mandate that operated the military mission in Kosovo.

Binns was promoted to brigadier on 31 December 2000, with seniority from 30 June that year. In January 2001, he assumed command of 7th Armoured Brigade, and was involved in operations in the Balkans and the Middle East. Binns' "gallant and distinguished services in the former Yugoslavia" in 2001 were recognised with appointment as a Commander of the Order of the British Empire, and he was awarded the Distinguished Service Order in October 2003 for his "services whilst on operations in Iraq during the period 19 March to 19 April 2003".

Binns served as Assistant Chief of Staff Commitments at Land Command until December 2005. Between this post and his next command, he attended the Royal College of Defence Studies. He was appointed to the honorary position of Deputy Colonel of the Regiment of The Yorkshire Regiment on 6 June 2006. He was appointed General Officer Commanding 1st (UK) Armoured Division on 1 October 2006 and promoted to major general on the same day.

Binns, having joined elements of 1st (UK) Armoured Division in Iraq where it formed HQ Multi-National Division (South East), Iraq, signed a memorandum of understanding that returned the responsibility for running the province of Basra to local Iraqi leaders. He signed the document, along with General Mohan al-Furaiji and Governor Muhammad Wa'ili, in a disused departure lounge of Basra airport.

After returning to the UK in February 2008, Binns was given the honorary appointment of Colonel-Commandant of The King’s Division on 10 December 2008. In 2009 he took over command of the Joint Services Command and Staff College. He gave evidence to The Iraq Inquiry about his role in the handing over of control on 15 January 2010.

== Later life ==
In June 2010, Binns became chief executive of Aegis Defence Services, a private military and security company.

In 2011, Binns was appointed to the honorary position of Colonel of the Regiment of The Yorkshire Regiment.

In June 2016, Binns remarked in a BBC report on the aftermath his campaign of in Iraq that "I don't think we had a coherent plan in the longer term. The coalition hadn't thought through how we were going to operate in the aftermath of the war fighting..."

== Personal life ==
Binns is married to Jennie. They have four children: Sophie (born September 1985), Thomas (born May 1988), Rosemary (born March 1990) and Matilda (born June 1992).

Binns enjoys many sports including golf, sailing and orienteering.

Military offices
Preceded by John Cooper	General Officer Commanding 1st (UK) Armoured Division; 2006–2009	Succeeded by Adrian Bradshaw
Preceded by Jonathan Shaw	General Officer Commanding; Multi-National Division (South East), Iraq; August 2007 – February 2008	Succeeded by Barney White-Spunner
Preceded by Neil Morisetti	Commandant of the Joint Services Command and Staff College; 2009–2010	Succeeded by Ray Lock
