= Barney White-Spunner =

British Army general

Lieutenant General Sir Barney White-Spunner KCB CBE
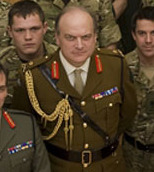
- Lieutenant General White-Spunner in 2011
- Born: 1957 (age 68–69)
- Military career
- Allegiance: United Kingdom
- Branch: British Army
- Service years: 1979–2011
- Rank: Lieutenant General
- Commands: Household Cavalry Regiment; Kabul Multinational Brigade; 3rd Mechanised Division; Multinational Division (South East); Field Army
- Conflicts: Bosnian War; Operation Essential Harvest; Iraq War
- Awards: Knight Commander of the Order of the Bath; Commander of the Order of the British Empire; Officer of the Legion of Merit (United States)
- Other work: Co-founder and Director of Burstock Ltd. Executive Chairman of the Countryside Alliance and Director of the Countryside Alliance Foundation. Chairman, Advisory Board, UK Fisheries Ltd

Lieutenant General Sir Barnabas William Benjamin White-Spunner KCB CBE (born 1957) is a retired British Army officer, who was subsequently executive chairman of the Countryside Alliance until 2016. He is an author of books on military history and a director of Burstock Ltd.

== Military career ==
Educated at Eton College and the University of St Andrews, Barney White-Spunner was commissioned into the Blues and Royals in 1979. He was appointed commanding officer of the Household Cavalry Regiment in 1996 and in that capacity was deployed to Bosnia. In 1998, he was promoted to colonel and became deputy director of defence policy in the Ministry of Defence during the Strategic Defence and Security Review and in 2001 he took charge of Operation Essential Harvest, which was aimed at disarming Albanian insurgents in Macedonia.

He became commander of the 16 Air Assault Brigade in December 2000 and was given command of the Kabul Multinational Brigade in 2002 before becoming Chief of Joint Force Operations for the national contingent in the Middle East in 2003.

By 2005, he was chief of staff at Land Command and in 2007 he was appointed general officer commanding the 3rd (UK) Mechanised Division. In February 2008, he deployed with elements of 3rd (UK) Mechanised Division to Iraq where those elements formed HQ Multinational Division (South East). He went on to be Commander of the Field Army in 2009.

He was appointed Commander of the Order of the British Empire (CBE) in 2002 and Knight Commander of the Order of the Bath (KCB) in the 2011 Birthday Honours.

On 7 January 2010, White-Spunner gave evidence to the Iraq Inquiry regarding the Battle of Basra.

He retired from the British Army in December 2011 and was appointed Executive Chairman of the Countryside Alliance and Director of the Countryside Alliance Foundation in January 2012.

In 2015, White-Spunner and George Busby co-founded Burstock Ltd, a consultancy company. Burstock has experience in defence and related sectors.

White-Spunner retired from The Countryside Alliance in 2016. He was appointed chairman of the advisory board of UK Fisheries in October 2018.

He serves as Trustee of The HALO Trust, the worlds largest humanitarian organization focused on clearing land mines and other debris of war.

== Authorship ==
White-Spunner first wrote articles for The Field magazine in 1992. Publications (chronological order):

- Baily's Hunting Companion, Cambridge, England: Baily's, 1994, OCLC 49733085 co-authored with British Field Sports Society.
- Our Countryside, Cambridge, England: Baily's, 1996, OCLC 38474081 co-authored with Simon Everett
- Great Days, Cambridge, England: Baily's, 1997, OCLC 51743648 — Contains extracts from past editions of Baily's hunting directory.
- Horse Guards, London: Macmillan, 2006, OCLC 61302547
- Of Living Valour : the Story of the Soldiers of Waterloo, London: Simon & Schuster Ltd, 2015, OCLC 904549365
- Partition: The Story of Indian Independence and the Creation of Pakistan in 1947, London: Simon & Schuster, 2017, OCLC 1023209355

Military offices
Preceded by Richard Shirreff	General Officer Commanding 3rd (UK) Mechanised Division; 2007–2009	Succeeded by James Everard
Preceded by Graham Binns	General Officer Commanding; Multi-National Division (South East), Iraq; February 2008 – August 2008	Succeeded by Andy Salmon
Preceded by Sir Graeme Lamb	Commander Field Army; 2009–2011	Post disbanded
Preceded by Sir Timothy Granville-Chapman	Colonel Commandant and President, Honourable Artillery Company; 2010–2013	Succeeded by Sir Richard Barrons
