= Andrew Stewart (British Army officer) =

Major General Andrew Stewart CB CBE
- Born: 1952 (age 73–74)
- Military career
- Allegiance: United Kingdom
- Branch: British Army
- Service years: 1972–2008
- Rank: Major General
- Conflicts: Iraq War
- Awards: Companion of the Order of the Bath; Commander of the Order of the British Empire

Major General Andrew Richard Evelyn De Cardonnel Stewart CB CBE (born 1952) is a former British Army officer who became General Officer Commanding Multi-National Division (South East), Iraq.

== Military career ==
Educated at Felsted School, Stewart was commissioned into the 13th/18th Hussars in 1972. He became Commander of 7th Armoured Brigade in December 1996, Assistant Chief of Staff (Operations) at Permanent Joint Headquarters in Northwood November 1999 and Director of Military Assistance Overseas at the Ministry of Defence in December 2001. He was deployed as General Officer Commanding Multi-National Division (South East), Iraq in December 2003 and became Assistant Chief of the Defence Staff (Policy) in 2004. He retired in 2008.

Military offices
Preceded by New Post	General Officer Commanding; Multi-National Division (South East), Iraq; 2003–2004	Succeeded by Bill Rollo
