= Graeme Lamb =

British Army general (born 1953)

Lieutenant General Sir Graeme Lamb KBE CMG DSO
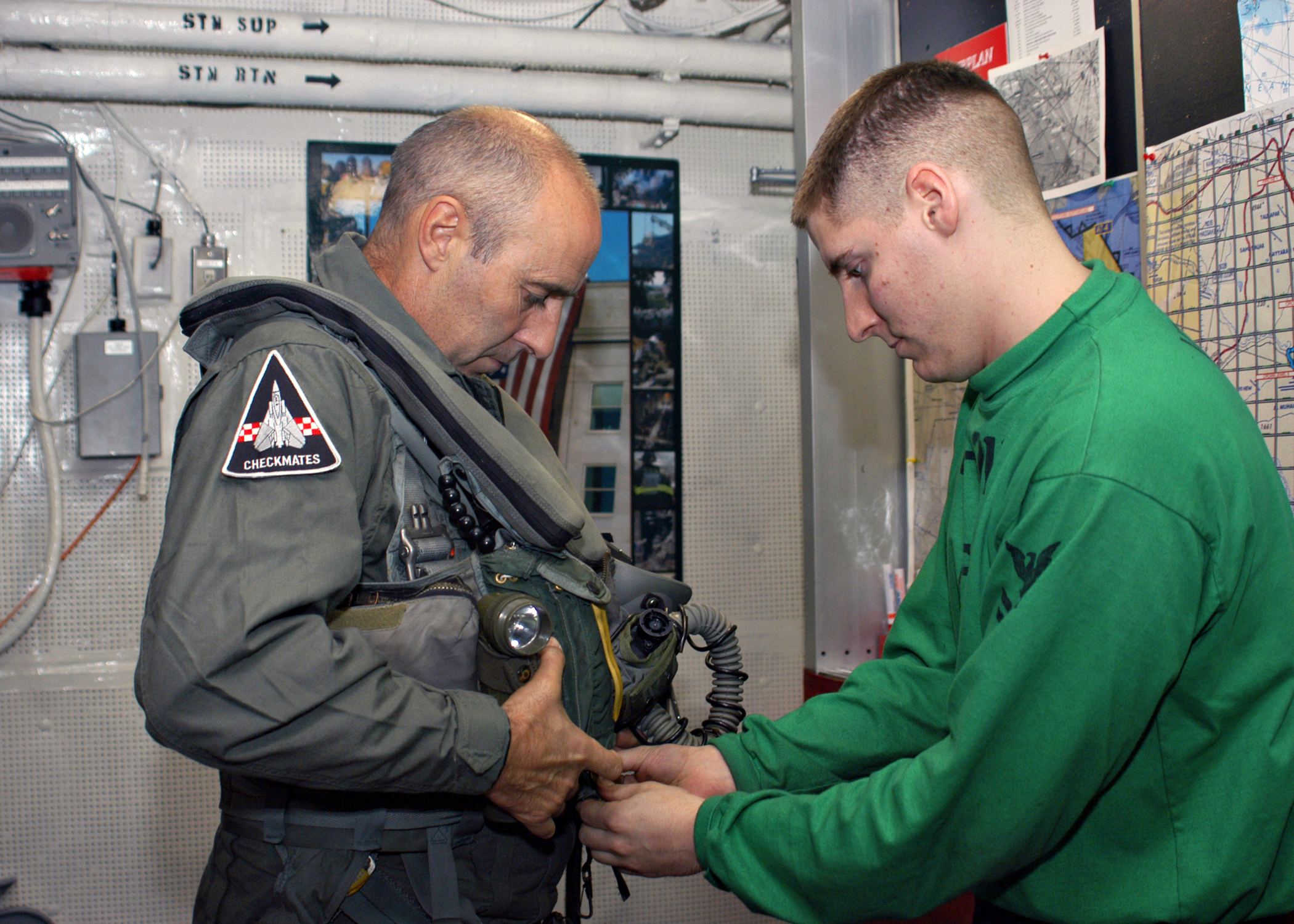
- Lamb (left) on board USS Enterprise on 27 November 2003
- Born: 21 May 1953 (age 73)
- Military career
- Allegiance: United Kingdom
- Branch: British Army
- Service years: 1973–2009
- Rank: Lieutenant General
- Unit: Queen's Own Highlanders
- Commands: Field Army; 3rd Mechanised Division; Director Special Forces; 5th Airborne Brigade; 1st Battalion, Queen's Own Highlanders
- Conflicts: The Troubles; Gulf War; Bosnian War; Iraq War; War in Afghanistan
- Awards: Knight Commander of the Order of the British Empire; Companion of the Order of St Michael and St George; Companion of the Distinguished Service Order; Mentioned in Despatches; Queen's Commendation for Valuable Service; Legion of Merit (United States)

Lieutenant General Sir Graeme Cameron Maxwell Lamb, KBE, CMG, DSO (born 21 May 1953) is a retired British Army officer. He is a former Commander of the Field Army at Land Command, known for his contributions to counter-insurgency.

== Military career ==
Educated at Rannoch School and the Royal Military Academy Sandhurst, Lamb was commissioned into the Queen's Own Highlanders as a second lieutenant on 8 March 1973. He has served in Northern Ireland and in various theatres of war, including Bosnia.

Lamb was promoted lieutenant on 8 September 1974, captain on 8 March 1979, and in 1981 he was Mentioned in Despatches for service in Northern Ireland. In the 1988 Birthday Honours he was appointed a Member of the Order of the British Empire. He was promoted lieutenant colonel on 30 December 1990 (with seniority from 30 June 1990), and commanded the 1st Battalion the Queen's Own Highlanders from 1991 to 1993. On 26 April 1994 he was appointed an Officer of the Order of the British Empire for his service in the Gulf War in 1991, and was awarded a Queen's Commendation for Valuable Service for operational service in Northern Ireland in 1993. He was promoted colonel on 30 June 1994, and brigadier on 30 June 1996, when he was appointed commander of the 5th Airborne Brigade. He then went on to join the staff of the Joint Services Command and Staff College. From 2001 to 2003 he served as Director Special Forces.

In the 2003 Birthday Honours, Lamb was appointed a Companion of the Order of St Michael and St George. On 2 July 2003 he was appointed General Officer Commanding 3rd (UK) Mechanised Division and promoted to major general. The formation deployed to Iraq, for the Iraq War. For his service in Iraq, he was appointed a Companion of the Distinguished Service Order on 23 April 2004.

In 2005 Lamb became Director-General, Training Support and on 7 September 2006 he was deployed as Senior British Military Representative and Deputy Commanding General, Multinational Force, Iraq and promoted to lieutenant general. In relation to this role, Lamb gave evidence to The Iraq Inquiry on 9 December 2009, in which he spoke of the shortcomings of the Coalition Provisional Authority. He became Commander Field Army on 19 October 2007, and on 6 November received the honorary appointment of Colonel Commandant, Small Arms School Corps. He was advanced to Knight Commander of the Order of the British Empire in the 2009 New Year Honours. In 2009 he was appointed Officer of the Legion of Merit of the United States for his service in Iraq.

Lamb stepped down as Commander, Field Army on 6 July 2009, to be succeeded by Barney White-Spunner. In August 2009 it was reported that he would be heading for Afghanistan at the direct request of General David Petraeus of the United States Army to head a programme designed to repeat the success of Lamb's efforts in Iraq, whereby insurgents were persuaded to give up their arms. Lamb has described how US General Stanley A. McChrystal convinced him to join his team over dinner in Arlington County, Virginia. By late October 2009 he had arrived in Afghanistan. He stepped down as Colonel Commandant of the Small Arms School Corps on 13 November 2009, and officially retired from the British Army the following day, retaining a commission in the Reserve of Officers.

== Post-retirement ==
Lamb again joined General Stan McChrystal lecturing for the course, Gateway to Global Affairs, at Yale University in 2011.

Lamb serves as a "special adviser" to strategic advisory firm G3 and as director to private military company Aegis Defence Services. In March 2012, it emerged that Lamb's company G3 had earlier received a £1.5 million contract from the government of Bahrain for "a media campaign to support the Kingdom of Bahrain's stance before the international community." This led to allegations that Lamb may have been paid to praise Bahrain's government in public comments and written columns during the Bahraini uprising.

Lamb is a key consultant at Skarbek Associates and is a Strategic Partner of C5 Capital, Chairman of ITC Advisory Board and an adviser to Palantir Technologies.

== Interests ==
Lamb represented Sandhurst at modern pentathlon; won the army bobsleigh championship in 1975, also coming fifth in the British national championship and 31st in the Nations Cup; and is chairman of the army snowboarding association. Lamb has been described as being "obsessively fit" and craving "adrenalin".

== Personality ==
A "particularly aggressive general", Lamb is said to have a "reputation for toughness" and enjoys an "easy way with soldiers" and a certain "mystique". Although known for his "blasphemous plain speaking" and a dislike of overly intellectual ideas, friends have declared that what he most values is clarity and robustness of thought. Lamb is well known for having achieved very close working relationships with various U.S. commanders, including McChrystal.

== Counter-insurgency ==
Lamb has been credited with having exercised substantial influence over the evolution of counter-insurgency in Iraq from 2006 onwards. Recent contemporary histories of Iraq paint a favourable impression of Lamb as Senior British Military Representative (Iraq), suggesting that Lamb, influenced by his experiences in Northern Ireland, convinced his U.S. colleagues to adopt the principle of "limited war" — a process requiring "patience, subtlety, and a willingness to accept that Iraqis' own proclivities were going to drive much of the war's outcome", leading to Lamb's own "strategic engagement initiative' of 2006–7. Lamb's departure in July 2007 left "a tremendous gap in the command's institutional memory".

As part of limited war, Lamb has emphasised the importance of precision in the use of force; he is cited as inventing the "inverse ink-spot", which reverses the traditional ink- or oil-spot approach to counter-insurgency by attacking the middle-ranks of an insurgency movement. Other phrases associated with Lamb include the terms "reconcilable" and "irreconcilable", as more complex alternatives to "enemy" or "insurgent"; and the concept of a "squeeze box" to describe the effect of the pressure on ordinary Iraqis from extremists on both sides of the Shi'a and Sunni divide.

Lamb has always acknowledged the importance of targeted force in warfare; Lamb has been quoted as describing McChrystal's forces in Iraq as being "absolutely essential to setting the conditions that allowed the Awakening to move forward". Nonetheless, he has also stressed the importance of timing in the final outreach process. Lamb is quoted as suggesting that the timing of his strategic engagement initiative in Iraq was critical, stating that if "we tried to do it in mid-2004, it would have crashed and burned... [b]ecause at the end of the day, people hadn’t exercised their revenge. They hadn’t stood at the edge of the abyss and looked into it." In a similar vein, Lamb has stated that "certain things were possible in 2006 that would not have been possible in 2004 or 2005". Interviews in 2009 with Lamb have led to him being labelled as a pragmatist in terms of tribal engagement; he has noted that "...given the difficulties we were facing, the absolute inability of the Iraqis to cope themselves, and a violent insurgency that was approaching the tipping point, we really didn't feel we had much choice."

== Bibliography ==
- Robinson, Linda. (2008) Tell me how this ends: General David Petraeus and the search for a way out of Iraq. New York: Public Affairs.
- Storrie, Sandy. "Talking To The 'Enemy' – Informal Conflict Termination in Iraq." in British Army Review, No.148, Winter 2009/2010, pp. 13–26.
- Urban, Mark. (2010) Task Force Black. London: Little Brown.

Military offices
| Preceded by John Holmes | Director Special Forces; 2001–2003 | Succeeded by Jonathan Shaw |
| Preceded by John McColl | General Officer Commanding 3rd (UK) Mechanised Division; 2003–2005 | Succeeded by Richard Shirreff |
| Preceded by Robert Fry | Senior British Military Representative and Deputy Commanding General, Multinational Force, Iraq; 2006–2007 | Succeeded by Bill Rollo |
| Preceded by Robin Brims | Commander Field Army; 2007–2009 | Succeeded by Sir Barney White-Spunner |
