= Andy Salmon =

Retired Royal Marines officer (born 1959)

Major General Andy Salmon CMG OBE
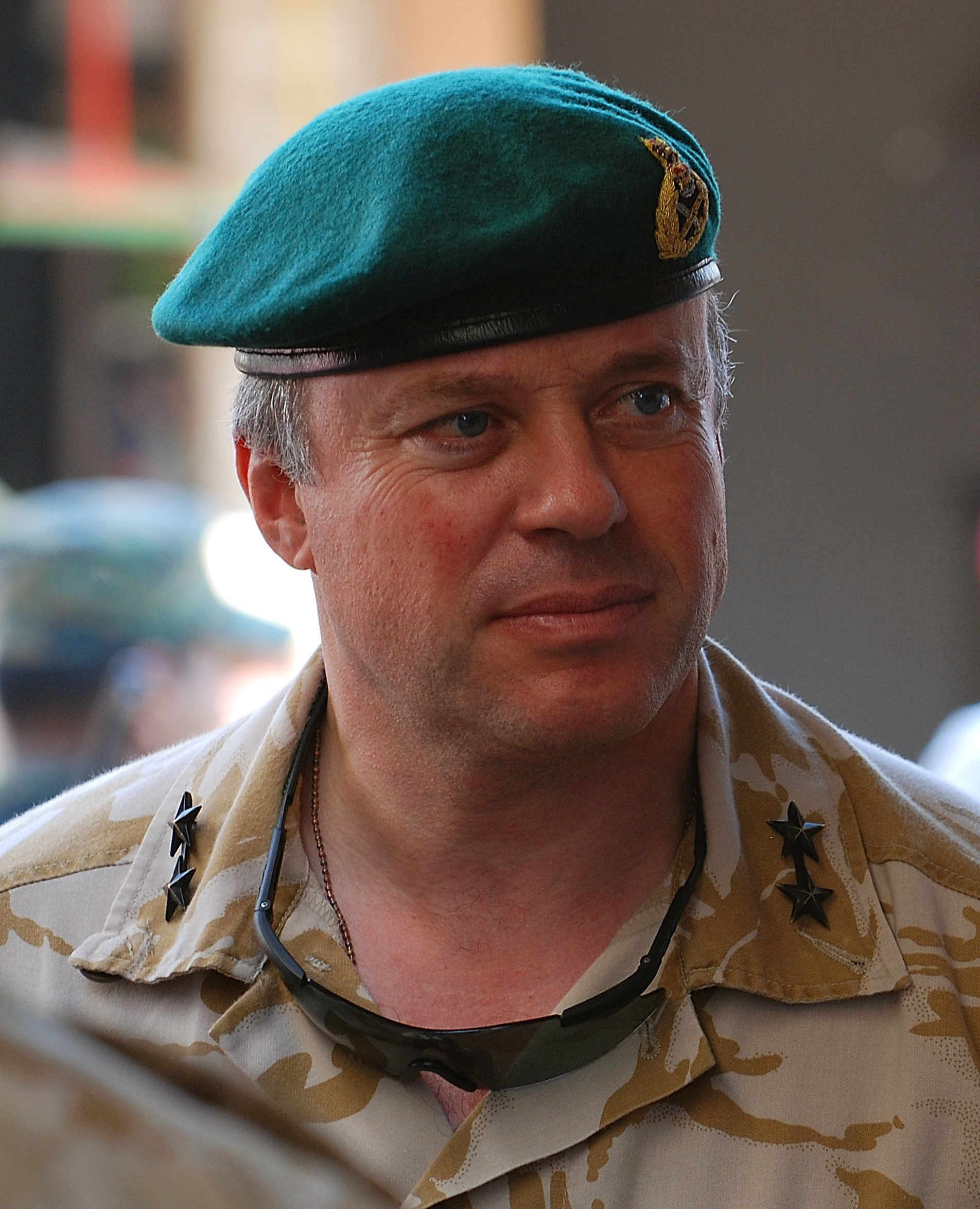
- Andy Salmon in Al Qurnah District, Iraq in 2008
- Born: 2 July 1959 (age 67)
- Military career
- Allegiance: United Kingdom
- Branch: Royal Marines
- Service years: 1977–2013
- Rank: Major General
- Commands: Commandant General Royal Marines; Multi-National Division (South-East) (Iraq); Commando Training Centre Royal Marines; 42 Commando
- Conflicts: The Troubles; Falklands War; Gulf War; Sierra Leone Civil War; Iraq War
- Awards: Companion of the Order of St Michael and St George; Officer of the Order of the British Empire; Queen's Commendation for Valuable Service; Bronze Star Medal (United States)

Major General Andrew Salmon (born 2 July 1959) is a retired Royal Marines officer who served as Commandant General Royal Marines from 2009 to 2010.

== Early life ==
Salmon was born on 2 July 1959 in Wellington, Shropshire, England. He was educated at the Royal Grammar School, Clitheroe and the Royal Grammar School, Guildford, before attending Godalming College to do his A-levels. He graduated from the University of Warwick with a Bachelor of Arts in modern history in 1980, and later earned a Master of Arts in defence studies from King's College London in 1993.

== Military career ==
Salmon joined the Royal Marines in 1977. In his early service years, he was involved in various operations including tours in Belfast (1978), the Falklands (1982), Crossmaglen (1983), South Armagh (1990), Northern Iraq (1991) and Angola (1992). During this time he served with 40 Commando, 42 Commando and 45 Commando.

Salmon was Policy Advisor to the Chiefs of Staff during the Kosovo War between 1998 and 1999. He then served as commanding officer of 42 Commando, attached to the Amphibious Ready Group (since renamed the "Amphibious Task Group"), during two interventions in Sierra Leone in 2000. He received the Queen's Commendation for Valuable Service "in recognition of gallant and distinguished services" during the latter deployment. In 2001 he became Director, Balkans in the Ministry of Defence and handled issues arising from the Insurgency in the Republic of Macedonia and relations with the International Criminal Tribunal for the former Yugoslavia before being posted to Iraq as Director Plans, Coalition Military Assistance and Training Team, Baghdad in 2003. Salmon was appointed an Officer of the Order of the British Empire in the 2004 New Year Honours and, in December 2006, was granted permission to wear the Bronze Star Medal he had received from the United States "in recognition of gallant and distinguished services during coalition operations in Iraq".

Salmon became Commandant of the Commando Training Centre Royal Marines in 2007, before being appointed Commander UK Amphibious Forces in 2008. He was deployed as General Officer Commanding Multi-National Division (South East), Iraq in August 2008. In recognition of his "gallant and distinguished service in Iraq", Salmon was appointed a Companion of the Order of St Michael and St George in September 2009.

Salmon assumed the appointment of Commandant General Royal Marines, the professional head of the Royal Marines, during a ceremony held at the Commando Training Centre Royal Marines in Lympstone, Devon, on 26 June 2009. He became Director of Force Readiness and Generation in NATO in 2010 and built their new Comprehensive Crisis and Operations Management Centre. He retired from the Royal Marines on 9 April 2013, after 36 years of service.

== Personal life ==
Salmon is president and founder of the C Group, a Fellow of the Royal Society of Arts, and sits on the Advisory Board of the Security Gap Programme at the London School of Economics, where he is a Visiting Senior Fellow.

Military offices
Preceded by Barney White-Spunner	General Officer Commanding; Multi-National Division (South East), Iraq; 2008–2009	Division disbanded
Preceded by Garry Robison	Commandant General Royal Marines; 2009–2010	Succeeded by Buster Howes
