= List of NATO installations in Afghanistan =

This is a list of North Atlantic Treaty Organization (NATO) installations in Afghanistan used during the War in Afghanistan from 2001 to 2021. This list encompasses installations used by the International Security Assistance Force from 2001 to 2014 and by the Resolute Support Mission afterwards. Included are airbases, forward operating bases, main operating bases, combat outposts, firebases, and patrol bases used by NATO forces across the six regional commands (renamed Train Advise Assist Commands after 2014): Regional Command Capital, Regional Command East, Regional Command North, Regional Command South, Regional Command Southwest, and Regional Command West.

== History ==
After 30 September 2013, there were only five sites used by the United Kingdom in Helmand Province including Camp Bastion (the main British base, closed 26 October 2014), MOB Price, MOB Lashkar Gah, PB Lashkar Gah Durai and OP Sterga 2 (last base outside Bastion, closed May 2014). After July 2021, all bases outside of Kabul were closed or transferred to the Afghan government. Some military infrastructure remained in Kabul to secure the U.S. embassy, the international zone, and Hamid Karzai International Airport.

== Regional Command Capital ==
Regional Command Capital includes the province of Kabul and was headquartered at Camp KAIA.

=== Kabul Province ===
Kabul Province Installations
Type	Name	District	Opened	Closed	Forces	Notes
Camp	HKIA/KAIA (Hamid Karzai Int'l Airport)	Kabul District	2005		ISAF Headquarters; ISAF Joint Command; Turkish Army; US Army; USMC; US Air Force; Australian Army; British Army; Canadian Army; Mongolian Armed Forces	ISAF Headquarters; ISAF Joint Command Headquarters; Headquarters for RC-Capital
Camp	Alamo	Kabul District			US Army; Australian Army	NATO Training Mission. Soldiers and Contractors.
Camp	Bala Hissar	Kabul District			US Army	
Camp	Black Horse	Kabul District	2008		US Army; Canadian Army	
Camp	Dogan	Kabul District	2002	Feb 2015	Turkish Army	
Camp	Dubs	Kabul District				
Camp	Duskin	Kabul District				
Camp	Eggers	Kabul District	2006	2014	NATO Training Mission-Afghanistan; US Army; USMC; US Air Force; Australian Army; New Zealand Army; French Army; Turkish Army; Mongolian Armed Forces	NATO Training Mission – Afghanistan Headquarters
Camp	Green	Kabul District				
Camp	Integrity	Kabul District				
Camp	Invicta	Kabul District	2006		Italian Army	
Camp	Julien (Julian)	Kabul District	Apr 2007 2003	— 29 Nov 2005	Canadian Army	Reopened as a Counterinsurgency Academy in April 2007.
Camp	New Sarobi FOB Tora	Surobi District			French Army	
Camp	Oqab	Kabul District				
Camp	Policharki	Kabul District				
Camp	Qargha	Kabul District			British Army; Australian Army; Turkish Army	Active as of May 2019.
Camp	Qasaba	Kabul District				
Camp	Scorpion	Kabul District				
Camp	Souter Camp Phoenix	Kabul District			British Army; US Army	Active as of December 2007
Camp	Warehouse				Canadian Army; French Army; Hungarian Army	

== Regional Command East ==
Regional Command East includes the provinces of Bamyan, Ghazni, Kapisa, Khost, Kunar, Laghman, Logar, Nangarhar, Nuristan, Paktika, Paktiya, Panjshir, Parwan and Wardak. Bagram Airfield is the home to RC-East command headquarters.

The Provincial Reconstruction Team (New Zealand), responsible for Bamyan Province, had its main base in Bamyan from 2003 onwards.

Contents
- Ghazni
- Kapisa
- Khost
- Kunar
- Laghman
- Logar
- Nangarhar
- Nuristan
- Paktika
- Paktiya
- Panjshir
- Parwan
- Wardak

=== Kunar or Nuristan Province ===
Kunar or Nuristan Province Installations
Type	Name	District	Opened	Closed	Forces	Notes
FOB	Badel			Before May 2013	US Army; USMC	Located in either Kunar or Nuristan Province
FOB	Bari Ali			Before May 2013	US Army; USMC	Located in either Kunar or Nuristan Province
FOB	Big Avalanche			Before May 2013	US Army; USMC	Located in either Kunar or Nuristan Province
FOB	Clydesdale			Before May 2013	US Army; USMC	Located in either Kunar or Nuristan Province
Firebase	Falcon			Before May 2013	US Army; USMC	Located in either Kunar or Nuristan Province
Firebase	Fiaz			Before May 2013	US Army; USMC	Located in either Kunar or Nuristan Province
Firebase	Hammerhead			Before May 2013	US Army; USMC	Located in either Kunar or Nuristan Province
Firebase	Little Avalanche			Before May 2013	US Army; USMC	Located in either Kunar or Nuristan Province
Firebase	Mace			Before May 2013	US Army; USMC	Located in either Kunar or Nuristan Province
Firebase	Mustang			Before May 2013	US Army; USMC	Located in either Kunar or Nuristan Province
Firebase	Penich			Before May 2013	US Army; USMC	Located in either Kunar or Nuristan Province
Firebase	Pirtle-King			Before May 2013	US Army; USMC	Located in either Kunar or Nuristan Province

=== Ghazni Province ===
Ghazni Province Installations
Type	Name	District	Opened	Closed	Forces	Notes
FOB	Andar				US Army	Delta 1-321 Airborne Field Artillery Regiment (2010); 623rd Engineer Company (2011); Company A, 201st Brigade Support Battalion (2011)
FOB	Arian COP Arian				Polish Armed Forces; US Army	Before 2011 it was called Combat Outpost Arian.
FOB	Ghazni				US Army; Polish Armed Forces; Afghan National Police (ANP)	Polish Task Force
FOB	Warrior				US Army; Polish Armed Forces	Polish Battlegroup B.
COP	Band-E-Sardeh	Andar District				
COP	Four Corners	Andar District				Formerly Called Firebase Casey in remembrance of SSG Casey Colmes kia 12 April 2007
COP	Miri Andar					Transitioned to ANSF
Firebase	Nawa	Nawa District			US Army; Afghan National Police	

=== Kapisa Province ===
Kapisa Province Installations
Type	Name	District	Opened	Closed	Forces	Notes
FOB	Kutchbach				French Army	Task Force Black Rock.
FOB	Nijrab				French Army	2nd Armored Brigade (France); Task Force Lafayette command post & Task Force Black Rock. Nicknamed FOB Morales Frazier.
FOB	Tagab				US Army	
COP	Belda	Alasay District	2009		US Army; French Army; Afghan National Army (ANA)	Named for a fallen French specialist with the 27th Alpine Mountain Battalion

=== Khost Province ===
Khost Province Installations
Type	Name	District	Opened	Closed	Forces	Notes
FOB	Salerno	Khost (Matun) District	2003	31 October 2013	US Army; US Air Force; US Navy	
Camp	Pucino	Khost (Matun) District		31 Oct 2013	USSOCOM	Sub-camp within FOB Salerno; Named for SSG Matt Pucino (ODA2223)
Camp	Clark	Mandozayi District			US Army	
FOB	Chapman Camp Chapman	Khost (Matun) District	2001		US Army; USSOCOM; CIA	Located 3.3 miles (5.3 km) north east of Khost City; Also known as Camp Chapman.
COP	Chergotah				US Army	
COP	Narizah				US Army	
COP	Sabari	Sabari District			US Army	
COP	Spera	Spera District		23 Dec 2010	US Army	
COP	Terezayi	Tirazayi District			US Army	

=== Kunar Province ===
Kunar Province Installations
Type	Name	District	Opened	Closed	Forces	Notes
Camp	Blessing FOB Blessing			2011	US Army; USMC	Named for SGT Jay Blessing (2nd Battalion, 75th Ranger Regiment)
Camp	Wright FOB Asadabad	Asadabad District			US Army	
FOB	Bostick FOB Naray		2006	2012	US Army	Formerly FOB Naray (until 2008); Named for Maj. Thomas Bostick; Near Kamu.
FOB	Joyce			Before May 2013	US Army	Possibly a Firebase.
COP	Fortress	Chawkay District	2004	2012	US Army	Possibly a Firebase
COP	Honaker-Miracle	Dara-I-Pech District		Before May 2013	US Army	Possibly a Firebase
COP	Michigan	Dara-I-Pech District		2011	US Army	Possibly a Firebase
COP	Monti				US Army	Possibly a Firebase
COP	Restrepo			Before May 2013	US Army	Possibly a Firebase
Fire Base	California	Dara-I-Pech District				Possibly expanded to a FOB.
Fire Base	Phoenix Firebase Vimoto	Dara-I-Pech District	2007	Before May 2013	US Army	
Fire Base	Vegas	Dara-I-Pech District		Before May 2013	US Army	

=== Laghman Province ===
Laghman Province Installations
Type	Name	District	Opened	Closed	Forces	Notes
FOB	Gamberi				US Army	

=== Logar Province ===
Logar Province Installations
Type	Name	District	Opened	Closed	Forces	Notes
FOB	Altimur	Altamur Village	2008	2013	US Army; Afghanistan National Police	
FOB	Charkh	Charkh District	2008		US Army	
FOB	Shank	Logar Province	2008	2014	US Army; Czech Armed Forces; Afghanistan National Army	
COP	Pul-e-Alam	Pul-i-Alam District	2009		US Army Afghanistan National Police	
COP	Kherwar	Logar Province	2009	2012	US Army Czech Armed Forces; Afghanistan National Army	Closed in August 2012 when deemed too hostile to continue operating. Rendered inoperable by USAF ordnance.
COP	Baraki Barak	Baraki Barak District	2009		US Army; Afghanistan National Police	
OP	Baraki Barak West (Spur)	Baraki Barak District	2009	2011	US Army; Afghanistan National Army	

=== Nangarhar Province ===
Nangarhar Province Installations
Type	Name	District	Opened	Closed	Forces	Notes
FOB	Connolly	Khogyani District		2013		Named after Sgt. Ryan Connolly of Santa Rosa
FOB	Fenty	Bihsud District	2007		US Army; US Air Force	Located within Jalalabad Airfield
FOB	Finley-Shields				US Army	Provincial Reconstruction Team Nangarhar
FOB	Kogyani				US Army	
FOB	Lonestar		Jul 2004	Dec 2012	US Army, USMC	
FOB	Shinwar	Shinwar District			US Army	
Fire Base	Torkham Gate	Momand Dara District	2006		US Army	

=== Nuristan Province ===
Nuristan Province Installations
Type	Name	District	Opened	Closed	Forces	Notes
FOB	Kalagush	Nurgaram District		Before May 2013	US Army	Last remaining US outpost in Nuristan Province. Outpost near to Battle of Do Ab.
COP	Keating	Kamdesh District	2006	2009	US Army	
COP	Combat Outpost Ranch House (Aranas)	Waygal District	2006	2007	US Army	
COP	Bella Base(Bella)	Waygal District	2006	2007	US Army	

=== Paktika Province ===
Paktika Province Installations
Type	Name	District	Opened	Closed	Forces	Notes
FOB	FOB Bermel Boris	Barmal District	~2003		US Army	Named for Captain Dave Boris; Formerly FOB Bermel 101st Airborne Air Assault Division 2/506th Currahee
FOB	Curry				US Army	B Company, Task Force 2-28, 172nd Infantry Brigade (2011)
FOB	Khoyr Kot Castle				US Army	
FOB	Kushamond	Dila District			US Army	
FOB	Orgun-E Camp Harriman	Urgon District	2003		US Army	Formerly Camp Harriman
FOB	Rushmore	Sharana District			United States	
FOB	Sharana Camp Kearney	Sharana District	2004	1 October 2013	US Army; Polish Armed Forces; ROK Army	Formerly Camp Kearney
FOB	Super FOB				US Army	
FOB	Tillman Firebase Lwara (aka "El Alamo")		2002		US Army	Formerly Firebase Lwara; Named for fallen US Army Ranger SPC Pat Tillman
FOB	Waza Khwa	Waza Khwa District			US Army; Polish Armed Forces	
COP	Margah Malekashay		2006		US Army	2nd Battalion, 87th Infantry Regiment 10th Mountain
Fire Base	Lilley Fire Base Shkin; Fire Base Checo	Barmal District			US Army; CIA	Named for fallen US Army MSG Arthur Lilley; Formerly Firebase Shkin; Unofficially Fire Base Checo
Fire Base	Terwah	Waza Khwa District			US Army	Closed, fell under the FOB Waza Khwa umbrella

=== Paktia Province ===
Paktiya Province Installations
Type	Name	District	Opened	Closed	Forces	Notes
FOB	Gardez	Gardez District	2003		US Army	
FOB	Lightning	Gardez District		29 March 2020	US Army	
FOB	Thunder	Gardez District			ANA	
FOB	Zormat	Zurmat District			US Army	
COP	Chamkani	Chamkani District			US Army; US Special Forces	
COP	Dand Patan	Dand Wa Patan District			US Army	
COP	Deysie	Shwak District	2008		US Army	
COP	Herrera	Zazi District	2008	2013	US Army	
Fire Base	Wilderness FOB Tellier	Gerda Serai District	2006		US Army; ANA	Also known as FOB Tellier

=== Panjshir Province ===
Panjshir Province Installations
Type	Name	District	Opened	Closed	Forces	Notes
FOB	Lion			28 Dec 2011	US Army	Intended to be converted into a Women's college

=== Parwan Province ===
Parwan Province Installations
Type	Name	District	Opened	Closed	Forces	Notes
Airfield	Bagram Airfield	Bagram District	2001	2021	US Army; USAF; Czech Republic; Georgian Land Forces; ANA; Polish Land Forces; Ugandan Reed Guards; Bosnia and Herzegovina Army; ROK Army; Mongolian Army	RC-East Headquarters; The largest American base in Afghanistan. Transitioned to Afghan control July 2021.
Camp	Albert	Bagram District	2004		US Army	Located within Bagram Airfield.
Camp	Blackjack	Bagram District			United States	Related to Bagram Airfield
Camp	Bulldog	Bagram District			United States	Related to Bagram Airfield
Camp	Civilian	Bagram District	2003		United States	Sub-camp within Bagram Airfield; Houses contractors
Camp	Cunningham	Bagram District	2004		United States	Sub-camp within Bagram Airfield
Camp	Gibraltar	Bagram District	2002		Royal Marines (RM)	Located within Bagram Airfield. Closed.
Camp	Warrior	Bagram District			United States	Related to Bagram Airfield.

=== Wardak Province ===
Wardak Province Installations
Type	Name	District	Opened	Closed	Forces	Notes
FOB	Airborne			2014	US Army	
COP	Carwille				US Army	Named for fallen US Army 1LT Donald Carwile (1-506th, 101st ABN)
COP	Dash Towp	Chak District	2011		US Army ANA	Built prior to 2011 but unoccupied by American forces prior to the beginning of 2011. ( 2-4IN, 4-10MTN DIV) VBIED attack 7/2011 Left a large number of the buildings destroyed.
COP	Sayed Abad	Saydabad District			US Army	
COP	Sultan Khyel				US Army	
COP	Tangi	Sayed Abad District		2011	US Army ANA	Transitioned to Afghan forces in April 2011, and abandoned by September 2011

== Regional Command North ==
The Regional Command North area of responsibility includes the provinces of Badakhshan, Baghlan, Balkh, Faryab, Jowzjan, Kunduz, Samangan, Sar-e Pul, and Takhar. The German Bundeswehr commands RC-North and is headquartered in country at Camp Marmal.

Contents
- Balkh
- Faryab
- Kunduz

=== Balkh Province ===
Balkh Province Installations
Type	Name	District	Opened	Closed	Forces	Notes
Camp	John Pratt	Mazar-e-Sharif District	14 Aug 2012		US Army	Possibly part of Camp Marmal.
Camp	Marmal	Mazar-e Sharif District	2005		German Army; German Navy; German Air Force; Royal Netherlands AF; Swedish Air Force; US Army; Mongolian Armed Forces	
Camp	Mike Spann	Mazar-e-Sharif District		1 May 2014	US Army	Located with ANA base Camp Shaheen
Camp	Stevenson	Mazar-e-Sharif District			US Army	
Camp	Voelke Jordania	Mazar-e-Sharif District	28 Sep 2012	28 Sep 2012	US Army	1st Battalion, 30th Infantry Regiment (2012). Renamed after Maj. Paul C. Voelke. 1st Battalion, 26th Infantry Regiment (2013)
FOB	Deh Dadi II	Deh Dadi, Dihdadi District			US Army	1014th Engineer Company (Sapper) (2011)
FOB	Hairatan (Heyratan)	Kaldar District			US Army	

=== Faryab Province ===
Faryab Province Installations
Type	Name	District	Opened	Closed	Forces	Notes
Camp	Meymaneh (Maimaneh)	Maymana District			Norwegian Army	Located at the airport.
COP	Ghowrmach ( Chinese (militærbase))			Aug 2012	US Army	148th Infantry Regiment
COP	Qaisar (FOB Qaysar)			Aug 2012	US Army	148th Infantry Regiment
FOB	Griffin COP Griffin			Aug 2012	US Army	148th Infantry Regiment, Echo Company 237th Support Battalion
FOB	Freia				US Army; Afghan National Army	

=== Kunduz Province ===
Kunduz Province Installations
Type	Name	District	Opened	Closed	Forces	Notes
FOB	Kunduz			1 Oct 2013	German Armed Forces; US Army	Provincial Reconstruction Team Last units: 6th Squadron, 4th Cavalry Regiment, 3rd Brigade Combat Team, 1st Infantry Division & 617th Engineer Company.

== Regional Command South ==
Regional Command South includes the provinces of Daykundi, Kandahar, Uruzgan, and Zabul. Kandahar Airfield serves as the headquarters for RC-South, which is commanded by the United States Armed Forces.

Contents
- Kandahar
- Uruzgan
- Zabul

=== Kandahar Province ===
Kandahar Province Installations
Type	Name	District	Opened	Closed	Forces	Notes	
Airfield	Kandahar	Kandahar District		Transferred to Afghan military May 2021	Belgian Air Force (BAF); Royal Air Force (RAF); Royal Canadian Air Force (RCAF); Royal Netherlands Air Force (RNLAF); US Army; US Air Force	RC-S Headquarters, approximate location 31.50737 N 65.85035 E	
Camp	Baker	Daman District			Australian Army	Located within Kandahar International Airport	
Camp	Losano	Kandahar District			RNLAF; US Army; US Air Force	Sub-camp located within Kandahar Airfield	
Camp	Nathan Smith	Kandahar District	2003	31 Jul 2013	Canadian Army; US Army	location 31.631031 N 65.735568 E	
FOB	Azim Jan Karez				US Army		
FOB	Azizullah				US Army		
FOB	Frontenac	Arghandab District	2008		Canadian Army	US Army Built by Canada in 2008 and turned over to the US Army in 2012 until closure. Nickname likely refers to; approximate location 31.86635 N 65.84791 E	
FOB	Howz-E-Madad	Zhari District	2010		US Army; Afghan National Army	Built by US, 101st Airborne Division	
FOB	Lindsey						
FOB	Martello	Shah Wali Kot District	2006		Canadian Army	In the vicinity of Gumbad village, occupied by troops of Princess Patricia's Canadian Light Infantry; approximate location 32.18181 N 65.87924 E	
FOB	Masum Ghar	Panjwayi District			US Army; USMC; Canadian Army; Afghan National Army	Primary combat base for Canadian battlegroup, including Leopard tanks, artillery, engineers, and infantry.; approximate location 31.54183 N 65.44991 E	
FOB	Pasab FOB Wilson	Zhari District			Canadian Army	US Army	; approximate location 31.58458 N 65.43660 E
FOB	Sarkari Karez FOB Ramrod	Maywand District			US Army	Formerly FOB Ramrod	
FOB	Scorpion				US Army		
FOB	Sperwan Ghar	Panjwayi District			Canadian Army; US Army; USMC; Afghan National Army	Combat Outpost - first occupied by Soviets in 1980s, then used by the Taliban for training, and captured in 2006 by Task Force 31 (US Special Forces); approximate location 31.49776 N 65.41848 E	
FOB	Spin Boldak	Spin Boldak District	2006		Canadian Army; French Special Forces; US Army; Albanian Special Forces; Romanian Army; Afghan National Army	Approximate location 30.99189 N 66.35746 E	
FOB	Tiger		2004	2005	US Army; Afghan National Army	Named in honor of the Louisiana State University mascot	
FOB	Walton			Closed	US Army		
FOB	Zangabad	Panjwayi District		2013	US Army		
FOB	Zettelmeyer	Arghandab District			Canadian Army	Small outpost compound on north side of Arghandab River, near Masum Ghar. Used by Canadians to support operations. Named for the distinctive heavy earthmover made in Germany and used by Canadian Military Engineers; approximate location 31.55009 N 65.44244 E	
COP	Ahmad Khan (Admadkhan)						
COP	Alizi						
COP	Ainsworth (Emarat)						
COP	Ashoque				US Army	Approximate location 31.5933 N 65.4929 E	
COP	Azim Jan Kariz						
COP	Caron (Caran)						
COP	Fitzpatrick				US Army		
COP	Ghundy Ghar		August 2007	November 2007	Canadian Army Afghan National Army	Approximate location 31.52439 N 65.28241 E	
COP	Hutal (Rath)	Maywand District			US Army		
COP	Johnston						
COP	Jelawur						
COP	Kandalay						
COP	Khenjakak						
COP	Kolk						
COP	Lakaray	Spin Boldak District	2009		US Army		
COP	Lakhokhel						
COP	Luke	Qazi Kariz District			Royal Air Force (RAF Regiment) US Army	FOB to enable Force Protection and Joint Foot Patrols with US Marines and US Army. Named after SAC Luke Southgate who was KIA in an IED strike in the AOR. Approximate Location 31°33'20"N 65°48'24"E	
COP	Macthab (Ballpeen)						
COP	Makuan						
COP	Mushan						
COP	Nalgham						
COP	Nejat						
COP	Neshin (Neshan)						
COP	Now Ruzi						
COP	Pashmul South						
COP	Sablaghay						
COP	Sangsar						
COP	Sperwan Ghar					See above	
COP	Talukan						
COP	Tarnak (Marianne)						
COP	Terminator (Atta Mohammed Khan)	Maywand District	2008		US Army		
COP	Ware (Charbaugh)						
COP	Zharir Kel (Zarifkhel)						
Patrol Base	Wilson	Arghandab District	2006	2010	Canadian Army, US Army	Route security post on Hwy 1, approximate location 31.58434 N 65.43404 E	
Fire Base	Maholic Camp Gecko Graceland		2006		US SOCOM; Canadian Special Forces	Formerly Camp Gecko.	
Strong Point	North	Arghandab District			Canadian Army		
Strong Point	South	Arghandab District			Canadian Army		
Strong Point	West	Arghandab District			Canadian Army		
Strong Point	Edgerton (Dand District)						
Strong Point	Gharibon						
Strong Point	Gorgon						
Strong Point	Haji Ramuden						
Strong Point	Haji Ramuddin II						
Strong Point	Theinhart (Theinert)						

=== Uruzgan Province ===
Uruzgan Province Installations
Type	Name	District	Opened	Closed	Forces	Notes
Multi National Base	Tarin Kot FOB Davis FOB Ripley	Tarinkot District		15 Dec 2013	Australian Army; New Zealand Army; USMC; US SOCOM; Royal Netherlands Army; Korps Commandotroepen; Afghan National Army	Formerly FOB Ripley.
Camp	Hadrian				Royal Netherlands Army	
Camp	Russell				Australian Army	Suspected to be closed.
FOB	Coyote				Royal Netherlands Army; Afghan National Army	
FOB	Phoenix				Royal Netherlands Army; Afghan National Army	
FOB	Tycz	Deh Rahwod District			US Army	
Firebase	Anaconda				US Army	Battle of Firebase Anaconda
Firebase	Tinsley Firebase Cobra		2009 2004	— 2009	US Army	Formerly Firebase Cobra.

=== Zabul Province ===
Zabul Province Installations
Type	Name	District	Opened	Closed	Forces	Notes
FOB	Apache	Qalat District			US Army; Romanian Army	
FOB	Baylough	Shah Joy District			US Army	Delta Company, 1st Battalion, 4th Infantry Regiment (2010)
FOB	Bullard	Shah Joy District			US Army	
FOB	Eagle				US Army; Afghan National Army	
FOB	Lagman	Qalat District	2004	Feb 2013	US Army; US Navy; Romanian Army; Afghan National Army	Formerly the main US/Romanian base in the Province. Named after Staff Sgt. Anthony Lagman, a soldier from Yonkers, N.Y. who was killed in action in 2004.
FOB	Lane	Arghandab District	2004	Nov 2011	US Army	Formerly A-Camp Lane. Named after SFC Mitchell A. Lane, 2-3 SFG(A). Closed on thanksgiving 2010 by 2/2 LST 2scr.
FOB	Mizan	Mizan District			US Army	
FOB	Masoud	Mizan District			Romanian Army; Afghan National Army	Near Route Chicken
FOB	Smart	Qalat District	2004	2013	US Army	Former home to PRT Zabul
FOB	Sweeney	Shinkay District	2004	2013	US Army	Named for Staff Sgt. Paul Sweeney
FOB	Viper	Tarnak Aw Jaldak District			US Army	Name of former American PMT stationed there. Referred to as "Snakes with guns" by local Taliban officials, who offered 100,000 Afghani, 10 times the normal bounty, for any Viper casualties.
FOB	Wolverine	Qalat District	2008	2013	US Army; Romanian Army; Afghan National Army	
Patrol Base	Seven	Qalat District	2011	2013	US Army; Romanian Army; Afghan National Army	

== Regional Command Southwest ==
Regional Command Southwest is headquartered at Camp Leatherneck and includes the provinces of Helmand and Nimruz.

Contents
- Helmand
- Nimruz

=== Helmand Province ===
Helmand Province Installations
Type	Name	District	Opened	Closed	Forces	Notes
Airfield	Bost	Lashkargah District		13 Mar 2020	USMC; US Army	
Camp	ABC				US Army	
Camp	Achabeti				US Army	
Camp	Antonik				US Army	
Camp	Aries 2				US Army	
Camp	Badger				US Army	
Camp	Barber				US Army	
Camp	Bishop				US Army	
Camp	Bolan				US Army	
Camp	Bouresches				US Army	
Camp	Calero				US Army	
Camp	Chosin				US Army	
Camp	Dangar				US Army	
Camp	Daytona				US Army	
Camp	Delmar				US Army	
Camp	Didgori				US Army	
Camp	Duluth				US Army	
Camp	Dwyer FOB Dwyer	Garmsir District	2007 2009	Closed 2009	USMC British Army; RM	Named after fallen British Lance Bombardier James Dwyer of 29 Commando Regiment, Royal Artillery. Active as of September 2014.
Camp	Eiffel				US Army	
Camp	El Haam				US Army	
Camp	El Paso				US Army	
Camp	Enguri				US Army	
Camp	Ertoba				US Army	
Camp	Gettysburgh				US Army	
Camp	Habib				US Army	
Camp	Honeycutt				US Army	
Camp	Januup				US Army	
Camp	Kelly				US Army	
Camp	Kems Bazaar				US Army	
Camp	Khalil				US Army	
Camp	Kopp				US Army	
Camp	Kunjik				US Army	
Camp	Lazika				US Army	
Camp	Leatherneck Tombstone	Nahri Saraj District	2008 2006	26 Oct 2014 2008	USMC	RC-SW Headquarters.
Camp	Mahafiz				US Army	
Camp	Maywand				US Army	
Camp	Mehraj				US Army	
Camp	Meis Ward				US Army	
Camp	Moose				US Army	
Camp	Orbi				US Army	
Camp	Palacio				US Army	
Camp	Paserlay				US Army	
Camp	Pleiku				US Army	
Camp	Qurta				US Army	
Camp	Reilly				US Army	
Camp	Rhino FOB Rhino	Garmsir District	25 Nov 2001	3 Jan 2002	USMC; US Navy; US Army; USAF; SASR	First USMC land base established in Afghanistan
Camp	Sacramento				US Army	
Camp	Saenz				US Army	
Camp	Said Abdul Khalil				US Army	
Camp	Saipan				US Army	
Camp	Shorabak Bastion	Nahri Saraj District	2006	26 Oct 2014 26 Oct 2014 26 Oct 2014 1 Jan 2013 26 Oct 2014 9 May 2014 20 May 2014 28 April 2014	British Army; RAF; Royal Navy (RN); Royal Marines (RM); USMC; Estonian Land Forces; Danish Defence; Tonga Defence Services	Formerly Bastion, the largest British base in Afghanistan and formerly home to Task Force Helmand.
Camp	Shurakay				US Army	
Camp	Sommerville				US Army	
Camp	Tarbett				US Army	
Camp	Wakil Wazir				US Army	
MOB	Lashkar Gah	Lashkargah District	May 2006	24 Feb 2014	British Army; RM	Formerly home to the 1st Mechanized Brigade headquarters. Handed over to the ANSF.
MOB	Price FOB Price	Nahri Saraj District	2012 2006	17 Mar 2014 2012	RM (Unknown-2013); British Army (2006–2014); Danish Defence (2006–13); US Army (2012); USMC (2008)	Formerly FOB Price.
FOB	Anchorman	Sangin District	Jun 2007	Closed	British Army; RM	Active as of April 2010.
FOB	Arnhem	Nahri Saraj District	August 2007		British Army; RM	Right Flank Scots Guards (7 Sept-?)
FOB	Budwan Armadillo	Nahri Saraj District	2010 2008	2011 2010	British Army; RM; Danish Defence	Formerly FOB Armadillo.
FOB	Delhi	Garmsir District	2006	Closed	USMC (2008 & June 2009-Unknown); British Army (2006 – 2008 & September 2008 – June 2009); RM	Active as of May 2013.
FOB	Edinburgh	Musa Qala District	2008	2012	British Army (2009); RM; USMC (2009–2012)	
FOB	Eredvi COP Eredvi	Nahri Saraj District		15 Jan 2014	USMC; Georgian Land Forces; e	Closing down convoy helped by a British battlegroup. Transformed into a Forward operating base
FOB	Gereshk		2003	Closed	USMC	Active as of 2013.
FOB	Geronimo	Nawa-I-Barakzayi District	Jul 2009	29 Mar 2013	USMC	
FOB	Gibraltar		2007	Jun 2009	USMC	
FOB	Golestan	Sangin District			USMC	
FOB	Hamidullah	Sangin District	2006	6 May 2014	USMC (Sep 2010 – May 2014); British Army (Unknown- Oct 2010); RM (Unknown- Oct 2010)	Previously FOB Nolay
FOB	Hanson Sher Wali			May 2013	USMC	Possibly upgraded to a Camp.
FOB	Inkerman				British Army; RM	
FOB	Jackson	Sangin District	2011 2008	Closed 2011	US Army British Army; RM	Named after Pte Damien Jackson, 3rd Battalion The Parachute Regiment; Active as of November 2012.
FOB	Khar Nikah Keenan		Jan 2010 2007	Closed Jan 2010	British Army; RM; Danish Defence	No. 3 Company, 1 COLDM GDS. Active as of January 2012. Formerly FOB Keenan.
FOB	Marjah	Nad Ali District		Closed	USMC	Possibly upgraded to a Camp.
FOB	Now Zad	Nawzad District		2 Aug 2013	USMC	
FOB	Payne			30 May 2013	USMC	
FOB	Pimon			Feb 2013	Estonian Land Forces	Handed over to the ANA.
FOB	Robinson; 2006-2014 Wolf; 2006-2006	Sangin Valley	2006	1 Feb 2014 2014 Unknown Unknown Unknown 1 Feb 2014	US Army; British Army; RM; Danish Defence; Union Defence Force; Canadian Forces; ANA	Named after Staff Sergeant Christopher L. Robinson, 36, Brandon, Mississippi. Formerly FOB Wolf. Now FOB Rahatullah controlled exclusively by the ANA.
FOB	Sabit Qadam	Sangin District		5 May 2014	USMC	Transferred to the 2nd Brigade, 215th Corps, ANA
FOB	Shamsher	Sangin District		Mar 2013	USMC	
FOB	Shawqat	Nad Ali District	Jul 2009	Aug 2013	British Army; RM	Last occupants: 2 LANCS. Built by 38 Engineer Regiment.
FOB	Sher Wali			Closed	USMC	
FOB	Shir Ghazay Shar Ghazay	Musa Qala District		29 Nov 2013	USMC; Georgian Army	Possibly upgraded to a Camp.
FOB	Shukvani			Closed	USMC	Possibly upgraded to a Camp.
FOB	Whitehouse	Kajaki		May 2012	USMC	HQ for 1st Battalion, 8th Marines.
FOB	Wishtan Patrol Base Wishtan	Sangin District	2010 2008	Closed 2010	British Army (August 2008-Closure); RM (August 2008-Closure); USMC (2008)	Built by Echo Coy, 2/7 USMC in 2008. Handed to British during October 2008. Active as of April 2010.
FOB	Zeebrugge	Kajaki District	2010 2010 2006	Dec 2013 Dec 2013 >2010	USMC ANA British Army; RM	Formerly a COB. HLS called Broadsword. Active as of May 2012.
COP	Faizel			Closed	USMC	Active as of May 2013. Possibly upgraded to a Camp.
COP	Kodori			Closed	USMC	Active as of May 2013. Possibly upgraded to a Camp.
Patrol Base	Airport Lounge	Sangin District		Closed	British Army; RM	OP H 11: B Company, 3 RIFLES; OP H 11: Chestnut Troop, 1 RHA, FST 2 OP H 12: Charlie Company, 40 Commando; OP H 12: 4th Regiment, RA.
Patrol Base	Almas	Sangin District	1 Nov 2009	Closed	British Army; RM; USMC (2010-)	Active as of February 2012. 3 km from FOB Jackson; OP H 11: 3 RIFLES
Patrol Base	Argyll	Nad Ali District		Sep 2009	British Army; RM	Replaced by the better FOB Shawqat a short distance away. Now a school.
Patrol Base	Armagh	Sangin District	11 Jul 2008	15 Aug 2008	British Army	2 km south of Sangin.
Patrol Base	Attal (Hero)	Nahri Saraj District	2008	Closed	British Army; RM; ANA	Previously a FOB. Active as of October 2013.
Patrol Base	Bahadur	Upper Gereshk Valley		Closed	British Army; RM	Active as of April 2012. NW of FOB Khar Nikah.
Patrol Base	Barioli/Bariolai	Sangin District		Closed	RM; USMC	Active as of April 2010; Bravo Company, 40 Commando during April 2010.
Patrol Base	Blenheim	Sangin District		Closed	British Army; RM	Active as of June 2010. OP H 11: 2 Platoon, A Company, 4 RIFLES
Patrol Base	Boldak			Closed	USMC	Active as of 10 November 2013. Possibly upgraded to a Camp.
Patrol Base	Catina	Nad Ali South		Closed	British Army; RM	Whiskey Company, 45 Commando during 2011.
Patrol Base	Chakaw	Sangin District		Closed	British Army; RM	1 km to the east of FOB Wishtan.
Patrol Base	Clifton			Mar 2013	British Army; RM	Handed over to the ANA.
Patrol Base	Emerald	Sangin District	15 Aug 2008	Closed	British Army; RM	Established by A Company, 3 PARA.
Patrol Base	Ezaray	Sangin District		Closed	British Army; RM	Bravo Company, 40 Commando
Patrol Base	Folad	Nad Ali District		Aug 2013	British Army; RM	
Patrol Base	Fulod Sangin Fulod	Sangin District		Closed	British Army; RM; USMC; ANA	Active as of May 2012. Possibly upgraded to a Camp. Formerly PB Sangin Fulod.
Patrol Base	Hazrat	Nahri Saraj District		Closed	British Army; RM; USMC; ANA	Active as of January 2013.
Patrol Base	Jahan Zeb		2011	Feb 2012	British Army; RM	Handed over to the Afghan security forces.
Patrol Base	Jaker	Nawa-I-Barakzayi District	2008	Closed	USMC (2009-); British Army (2008–2009); RM; ANA	Active as of April 2011.
Patrol Base	Juno			Closed	British Army; RM	Possibly upgraded to a Camp.
Patrol Base	Kalang			Closed	British Army; RM	
Patrol Base	Khamaar	Nad Ali District		Closed	British Army; RM	Anzio Company, 1 LANCS; B Company, 2 MERICAN; OP H 13: A Company, 3 PARA; Mike Company, RM
Patrol Base	Knarnikah			Closed	British Army; RM	
Patrol Base	Lambadand	Trek Nawa		Closed	USMC	Active as of September 2012. Possibly upgraded to a Camp.
Patrol Base	Lashkar Gah Durai	Lashkargah District		8 Mar 2014	British Army; RM; Danish Defence	Closed. 3 YORKS; 4 SCOTS
Patrol Base	Mahboob		Dec 2009	Closed	British Army; RM	Active as of October 2010.
Patrol Base	Masood	Masood District			Estonian Land Forces	Active as of November 2009.
Patrol Base	Meelet	Nad Ali South		Closed	British Army; RM	Whiskey Company, 45 Commando during 2011.
Patrol Base	Mirage	Musa Qala District	2008	Closed	USMC	Former Taliban HQ, built by 1/8 Marines. Active as of June 2011. Kilo Coy, 3/2 Marines during 2011.
Patrol Base	Nahidullah		2010	Dec 2012	British Army; RM	OP H 13: B Company, 2 SCOTS; OP H 17 (Last unit):Burma Company, 1 LANCS; Demolished by 21 Engineer Regiment.
Patrol Base	Ouellette FOB Ouellette Padnick	Nahri Saraj District	Unknown Oct 2011	Sep 2013 Unknown	British Army (Oct 2011 – Sep 2013); RM; USMC (Unknown-Oct 2011)	Possibly upgraded to a Camp. OP H 18: 4 RIFLES. Handed over to the Afghan National Civil Order Police (ANCOP). Formerly FOB Ouellette
Patrol Base	Padnick	Musa Qala		Closed	USMC	
Patrol Base	Pan Kalay			Closed	British Army; RM; ANCOP	Active as of April 2013. 1 SG
Patrol Base	Pylae	Sangin District		Closed	British Army; RM	Active as of October 2010. 8 Troop, Unknown Company, 40 Commando
Patrol Base	Qadrat	Nad Ali District		Closed	British Army; RM; ANA	OP H 13: 3 PARA.
Patrol Base	Rahim FOB Sandford		2008	Closed	British Army; RM; ANA	Formerly FOB Sandford. Active as of March 2012. C Company, 1 MERCIAN; A Company, 3 MERCIAN; 1 IG; B Company, 1 YORKS
Patrol Base	Salaang	Nad Ali District		Closed	British Army; RM; ANA	Formerly CP Salaang. Closed as of March 2013. B (Malta) Company, 1 MERCIAN; FST from 97 Battery (Lawson's Company) Royal Artillery(Op HERRICK 17)
Patrol Base	Samsor			Closed	British Army; RM	C Company, 1 PWRR; Corunna Company, 1 LANCS
Patrol Base	School House			Closed	British Army; RM	Company I, 3rd Battalion, 1st Marine Regiment
Patrol Base	Shaheed		2010	Closed	British Army; RM	OP H 11: B Company, 1 R WELSH
Patrol Base	Shahzad FOB Shahzad?	Nad Ali District		Sep 2013	British Army; RM	OP H 13: 3 PARA; OP H 13: 7 RHA; Prince of Wales's Company, 1 WG
Patrol Base	Shamal Storrai	Nad Ali District			British Army; RM	OP H 11: Arnhem Company, 2 LANCS; 4 RIFLES (2011); Yankee Company, 45 Commando (2012)
Patrol Base	Shamshad			Unknown Unknown Unknown	British Army; RM; Estonian Land Forces; USMC	Active as of 2011.
Patrol Base	Shuga	Sangin			British Army; RM	1 and 1/2 miles north of FOB Jackson; OP H 12: 40 Commando
Patrol Base	Silab	Nad Ali District		Jun 2012	British Army; RM	B Company, 4 RIFLES; OP H 16 (Last unit): 1 R ANGLIAN; Handed over to Afghan security forces. Possibly upgraded to a Camp.
Patrol Base	Sparta	Lashkargah District		Closed	British Army; RM	Royal Gurkha Rifles; Active as of July 2013.
Patrol Base	Talandaa	Route Dorset, Nad-e-Ali District		Closed	British Army; RM	
Patrol Base	Talibjan	Musa Qala District		Closed	British Army; RM; ANA	
Patrol Base	Tangiers FOB Tangiers	Sangin District	2008	2009	British Army (2008–2009); RM (2008–2009); USMC (2008); ANA (2009-Unknown)	Formerly FOB Tangiers; 2 RIFLES; Whiskey Company, 45 Commando; Handed over to the ANA.
Patrol Base	Viking	Sangin District		Closed	British Army; RM	OP H 11: A Company, 3 RIFLES.
Patrol Base	Wahid FOB Wahid	Nad Ali District	2009	Apr 2013	Estonian Land Forces; British Army; RM	D Company, 1 RGR; 2 Company, 1 WG; Handed over to the ANA.
Patrol Base	Waterloo	Sangin District		Closed	British Army; RM; ANA	40 Commando; Handed to 3rd Company, 2nd Kandak
Patrol Base	Yellow 14			Closed	British Army; RM	4 SCOTS
Patrol Base	Zumbelay Barakzjai			Closed	British Army; RM; Danish Defence	Formerly PB Barakzjai
Patrol Base	One	Nahri Saraj District	around 1 Sep 2009	before 26 Feb 2014	British Army; RM	Active as of April 2012. Believed to have been opened around September 2009; OP H 14 :A Company, 2 RGR; A Company, 5 RIFLES.
Patrol Base	Two	Nahri Saraj District	around 1 Sep 2009	Sep 2013	British Army; RM	Believed to have been opened around September 2009. OP H 13: Elements of 2 PARA; OP H 14: C Company, 1 RIFLES.
Patrol Base	Three	Nahri Saraj District	around 1 Sep 2009	before 26 Feb 2014	British Army; RM	Believed to have been opened around September 2009; OP H 11: 3 Company, 1 COLDM GDS; OP H 13: 5 SCOTS
Patrol Base	Four	Nahri Saraj District	around 1 Sep 2009	Mar 2013	British Army; RM; ANA	1 Company, 1 COLDM GDS (Nov 2009 – Apr 2010). Last unit was B Company, 1 RGR Believed to have been opened around September 2009. Possibly name changed PB Falcon Lawns.
Patrol Base	Five	Nahri Saraj District		Mar 2013	British Army; RM; ANA	Active as of October 2011; OP H 14: Kilo Company, 42 Commando
Firebase	Fiddler's Green	Nawa-I-Barakzayi District	Jul 2009	Closed	USMC	Active as of October 2011.
Joint Tactical Air Co-ordination	JTAC Hill		Oct 2008	Closed	British Army; RM	
District Centre	Kajaki			Closed	British Army; RM	OP H 8: D/X Company, 2 PARA
District Centre	Sangin			Closed	British Army; RM	2 PARA Battle Group HQ (Apr 2008 – Oct 2008); Guards Parachute Platoon, B Company, 3 PARA; C Company, 3 PARA
Platoon House	Musa Qaleh			Closed	British Army; RM	Pathfinder Platoon

=== Nimruz Province ===
Nimruz Province Installations
Type	Name	District	Opened	Closed	Forces	Notes
FOB	Caferetta		2008		USMC	
FOB	Delaram FOB Kerella	Delaram District	2008		USMC	Active as of 14 November 2013. Named for US Marine Cpl Jason Karella of 2nd Battalion 7th Marines

== Regional Command West ==
Regional Command West includes the provinces of Badghis, Farah, Ghor and Herat.

Contents
- Badghis
- Herat
- Farah

=== Badghis Province ===
Badghis Province Installations
Type	Name	District	Opened	Closed	Forces	Notes
FOB	Bala Murghab	Murghab District	2008		Italian Army; Spanish Army	3rd Bandera (Spain) (2008)
FOB	Columbus	Murghab District	2008		ANA	
FOB	Todd	Murghab District	2011		Italian Army USAF	

=== Farah Province ===
Farah Province Installations
Type	Name	District	Opened	Closed	Forces	Notes
FOB	Bakwah (Baqwah) (Bakwa)		2008		USMC	Company K, 3rd Battalion, 8th Marines (SPMAGTF-AFG) (2008)
FOB	Dimonios	Farah District			Italian Army	Home to Transition Support Unit – South (TSU-S).
FOB	Farah	Farah District	Sep 2004	Oct 2013	Italian Army; US Army; USMC; US Navy; US Air Force	
FOB	Tobruk	Bala Buluk District			Italian Army	Home to Transition Support Unit – South (TSU-S).

=== Herat Province ===
Herat Province Installations
Type	Name	District	Opened	Closed	Forces	Notes
Airbase	Shindand	Shindand District	2004	2014	Italian Air Force; Italian Army; US Air Force; Afghan Air Force (AAF)	Formerly FOB Shindand
Camp	Arena (Herat International Airport)	Herat District			Italian Air Force; Italian Army; US Army; Spanish Air Force	
Camp	Stone	Herat District		2014	Carabinieri; US Army	
Camp	Vianini			2012	Italian Army	
FOB	La Marmora	Shindand District			Italian Army	Home to Transition Support Unit – Center (TSU-C).

== Installations of Unknown Regional Province ==
Installations of Unknown Regional Command/Province
Type	Name	District	Opened	Closed	Forces	Notes
Firebase	Nixon					
Firebase	Oulet					
FOB	Bobcat	RC-SOUTH	After 2000			
FOB	Bushmaster	RC-SOUTH				
FOB	Carlson	RC-EAST				
FOB	Cobra					
FOB	Costall				Canadian Army	Named after Private Robert Costall, Canada's first combat casualty in the War on Terror.
FOB	Faizal			15 Jan 2014	United States	
FOB	Freia					
FOB	Ghecko	RC-SOUTH				
FOB	Indianhead					
FOB	Mehtar Lam					
FOB	Puza-i-Eshan					
FOB	Qalat	RC-SOUTH				
FOB	Shukvani			15 Jan 2014	United States	
FOB	Surobi	RC-CAPITAL				
PB	Shizad	RC-SW				
COP	Rankel	RC-SW			USMC	
COP	Ertoba				United States	

== See also ==
- List of Afghan Armed Forces installations
- Advance airfield
- Advanced Landing Ground
- Fire support base
- Forward operating base
- Forward Operating Site
- Loss of Strength Gradient
- Main Operating Base
