= Forward Operating Base Gibraltar =

British military base in Afghanistan (2007–2009)

FOB Gibraltar
- Helmand Province in Afghanistan

Site information
- Type: Forward Operating Base
- Owner: International Security Assistance Force (ISAF)
- Operator: British Army; Royal Marines

Site history
- Built: 2007
- In use: 2007-2009

FOB Gibraltar was a British-manned Forward Operating Base in Helmand Province, Afghanistan next to the Helmand River, near the town of Sangin. It was named after the port of Gibraltar, which was the lynchpin of British Naval dominance in the Mediterranean.

The mission for FOB Gibraltar was to train and support Afghan soldiers and take Taliban pressure off the Sangin area, so that the soldiers and the Provincial Reconstruction Team (PRT) could try to secure the population while improving their quality of life.

Taliban fighters who attacked FOB Gibraltar during the summer of 2008 referred to the base as the 'mouth of hell' or 'devil's place'. Of the 160 men of 2nd Battalion, Parachute Regiment (2 PARA) who manned the base, almost one in three were killed or wounded, a higher casualty rate than that suffered by British soldiers during the Second World War: Five killed in action, 14 seriously injured, and another 30 wounded. The Base was last occupied by C Coy 2 Rifles prior to the closure of the FOB in June 2009. C Coy 2 RIFLES moved to FOB Wishtan near Sangin.

== List of companies in FOB Gibraltar ==
- lash coy 2 York's secured and built
- D Company, 40 Commando, Royal Marines (December 2007 – April 2008)
- C Company, 2nd Battalion, Parachute Regiment (April 2008 – October 2008)
  - Temporarily supported by half of B Company, 3rd Battalion, Parachute Regiment during July 2008.
- Z Company, 45 Commando, Royal Marines (October 2008 – April 2009)
- C Company, 2nd Battalion, The Rifles (April – October 2009)

== See also ==
- List of ISAF installations in Afghanistan
