= Shamshad =

Shamshad may refer to:

== Given name ==
- Shamshad Abdullaev (1957–2024), Uzbek poet
- Shamshad Ahmad (born 1941), veteran Pakistani diplomat, international relations expert and an author
- Shamshad Akhtar (1954–2025), Pakistani development economist, diplomat and intellectual
- Shamshad Sattar Bachani, Pakistani politician
- Shamshad Begum (1919–2013), Indian singer in the Hindi film industry
- Shamshad Begum (social worker), Indian social worker
- Shamshad Cockcroft, British physiologist and a professor of cell physiology
- Shamshad Hussain (1946–2015), Indian artist
- Shamshad Khan (born 1964), Manchester based, Leeds born, poet
- Shamshad Pathan, Indian human rights lawyer and politician

== Surname ==
- Rizwan Shamshad (born 1972), Indian first class cricketer

== Other ==
- PB Shamshad, foreign military base in Helmand Province, Afghanistan
- Shamshad TV, satellite television station in Afghanistan, launched in early 2006
- Tolombeh-ye Shamshad Chah Jelali, village in Pariz Rural District, Pariz District, Sirjan County, Kerman Province, Iran

== See also ==
- Shams (disambiguation)
- Shamshabad
- Shamshadin
