= Forward Operating Base Edinburgh =

Former operating base in Helmand, Afghanistan

FOB Edinburgh
- Musa Qala District, Helmand Province in Afghanistan

Site information
- Owner: International Security Assistance Force (ISAF)
- Operator: British Armed Forces; United States Armed Forces

Location
- Shown within Afghanistan
- Coordinates: 32°21′42″N 064°42′10″E

Site history
- Built: 2007
- In use: 2007-July 2012

Airfield information
- Elevation: 798 metres (2,618 ft) AMSL
Helipads
Number	Length and surface
00	Gravel
00	Gravel

FOB Edinburgh was an International Security Assistance Force (ISAF) Forward Operating Base (FOB) operated by both the British Armed Forces and United States Armed Forces and located in Musa Qala District, Helmand Province, Afghanistan.

The base was used under Operation Herrick (OP H).

It was also seen in the episode "Joining the Royal Irish Regiment" of Ross Kemp: Return to Afghanistan, where Ross Kemp spends time at the base as well as with the soldiers out in the field.

Ross Kemp and his team are also cited as a distraction leading to the crash of an Apache AH1 that had taken off from the base in 2008 according to a Ministry Of Defence report. Both crew members escaped with minor injuries.

== History ==
=== British units ===
It has been used by:

- OP H VII - 52nd Infantry Brigade (December 2007 - March 2008)
- OP H VIII - 16 Air Assault Brigade (March 2008 - September 2008)
- OP H IX - 3 Commando Brigade (October 2008 - April 2009)
- OP H X - 19th Light Brigade (April 2009 - October 2009)
- OP H XI - 11 Light Brigade (October 2009 - April 2010)
  - 2nd Battalion, Royal Gurkha Rifles

=== American units ===
- 1st Battalion, 2nd Marines
- Alpha Battery, 1st Battalion, 11th Marines
- Charlie Battery, 1st Battalion 10th Marines, November 2010 - May 2011.
- Alpha Battery, 1st Battalion 12th Marines from April 2011 - November 2011.
- Kilo Battery, 3rd Battalion 10th Marines, Regimental Combat Team 7 from March 2010 to May 2010 (First American unit on the base and took control of it from the British).
- 576th EN CO, 4th EN BN, US Army, RCP, July 2011 to July 2012.
- 2nd Battalion 5th Marines, Regimental Combat Team 5 during June 2012.
- IMA Detachment, 1st Maintenance Battalion (-) (Reinforced), 1st Marine Logistics Group (Forward) during 2012.
- Charlie Company, 1-214th Aviation Regiment, "Weizen Dust-Off" from December 2010 to August 2011.
- Weapons Company, H&S Company, 2nd Battalion 5th Marines from March 2012 to September 2012 when the base was torn down.

== Photo gallery ==
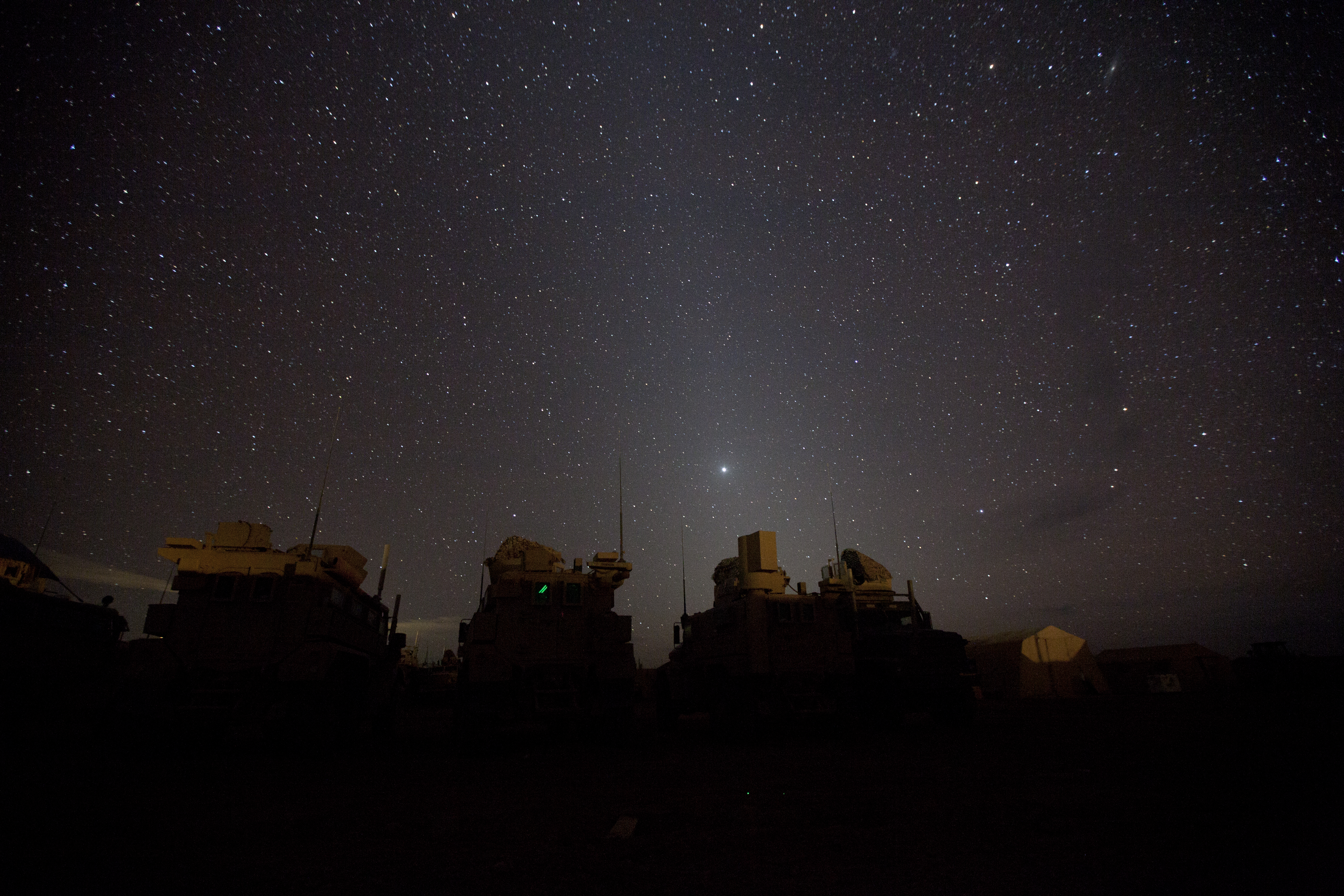
Vehicles of the U.S. Marine Corps under a starry sky at FOB Edinburgh, February 4, 2011.

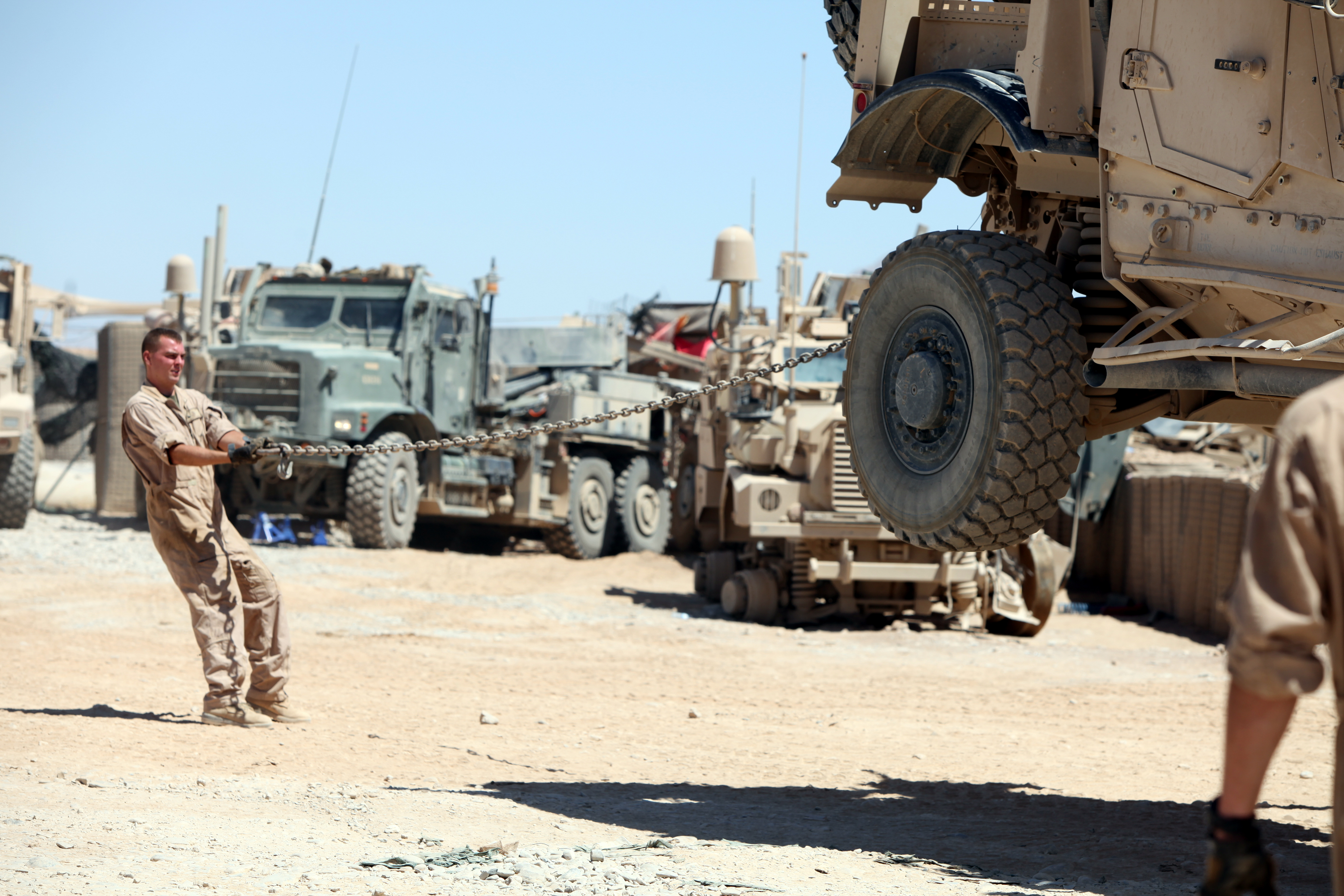
A U.S. Marine steadies an MRAP vehicle as it's lifted at FOB Edinburgh, June 20, 2011.

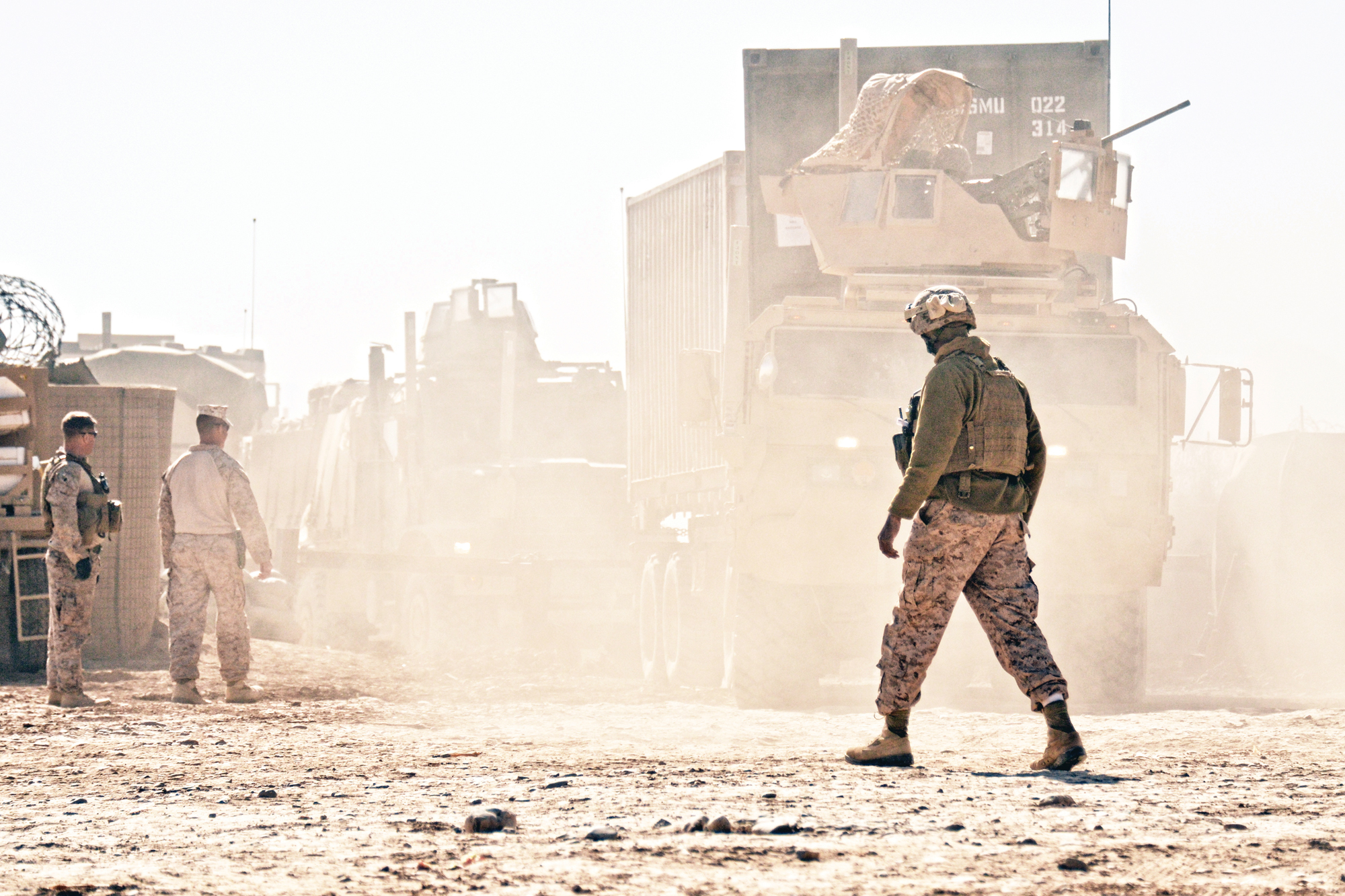
Staff Sgt. Weatherly oversees CLB-4 vehicles entering FOB Edinburgh on March 13, 2012.

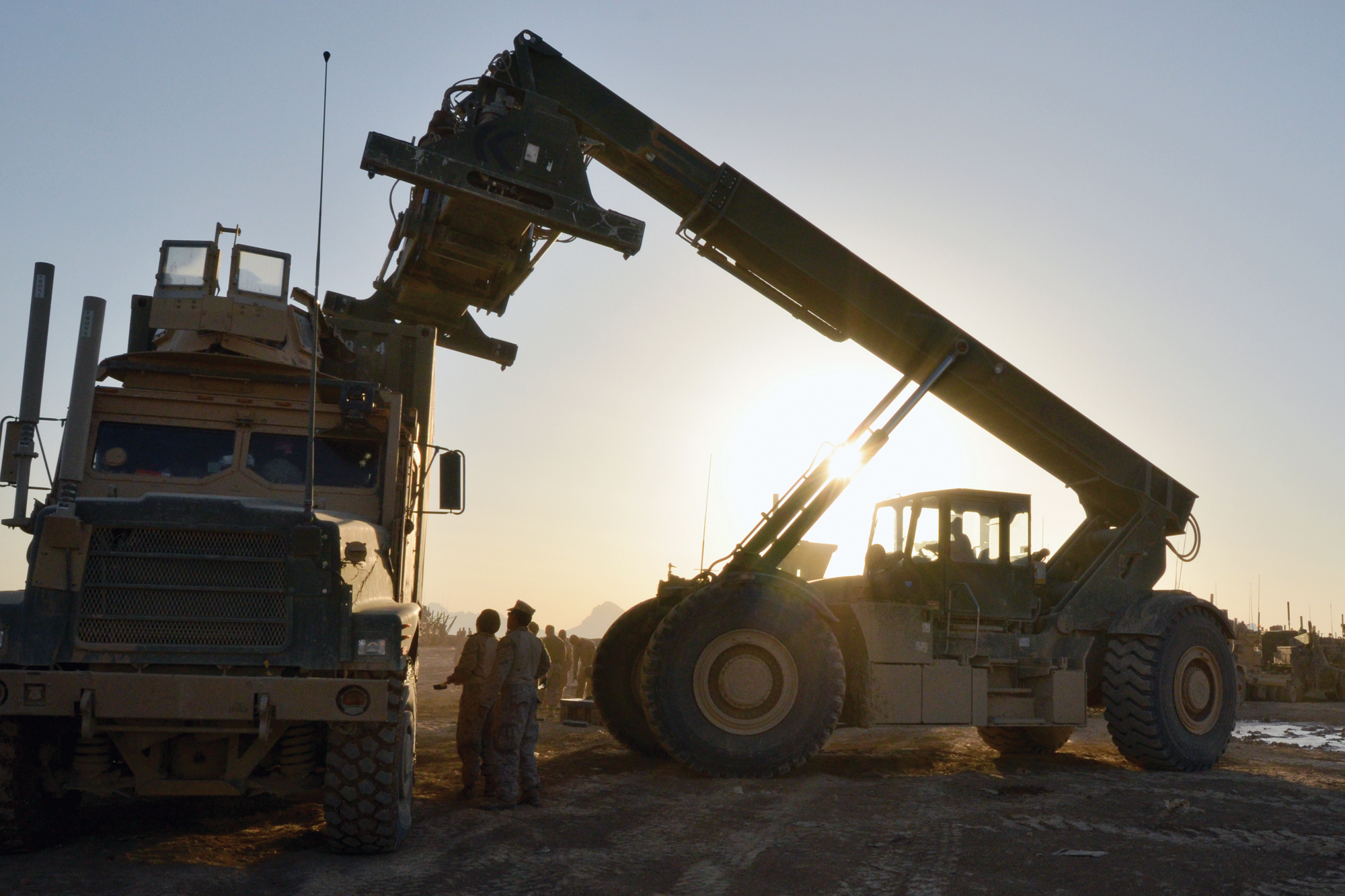
A CLB-4 handler loads a container onto an AMK31 truck at FOB Edinburgh on March 13, 2012, during retrograde operations.

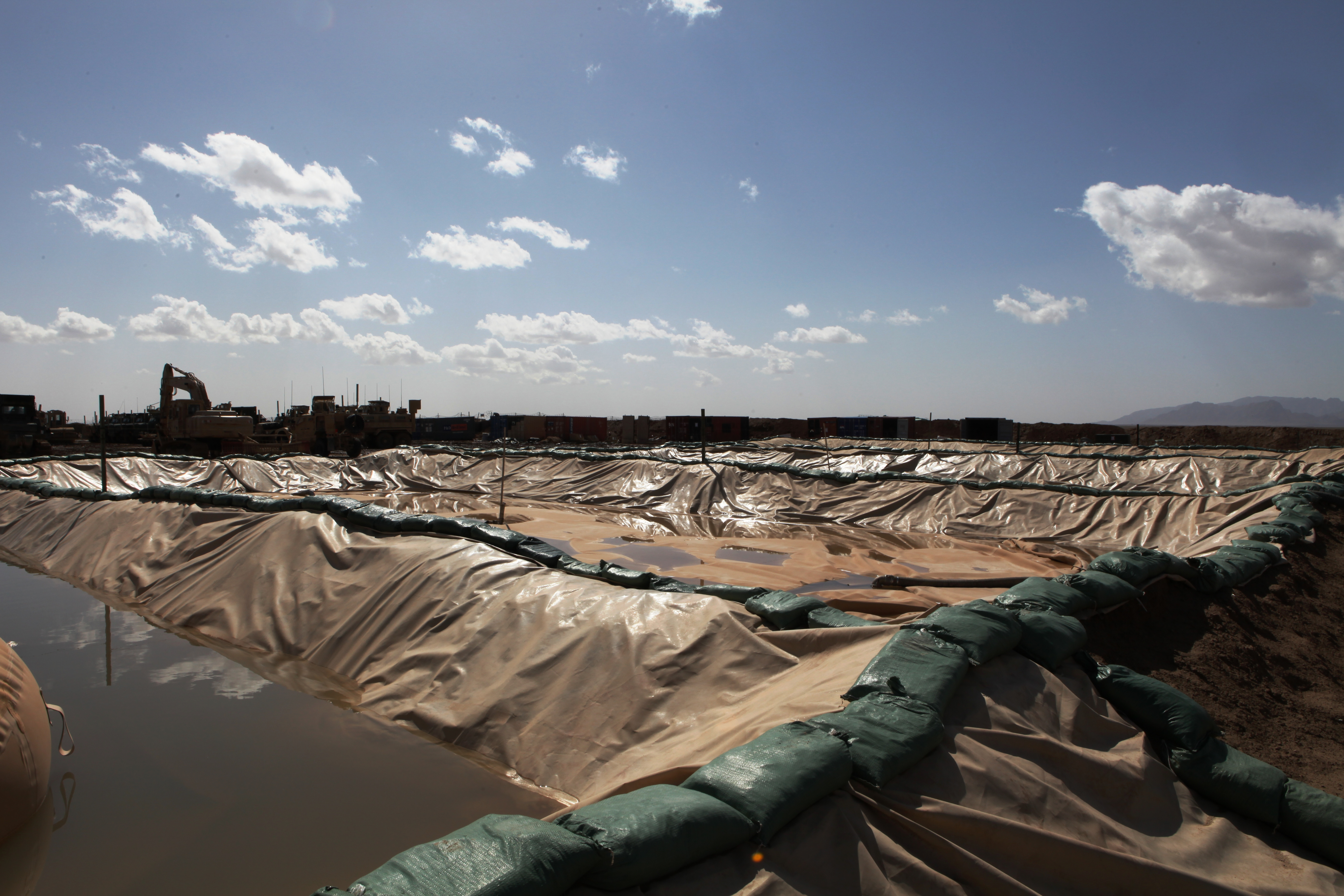
Inflatable storage containers at FOB Edinburgh hold fuel to support vehicles, aircraft, and equipment, dispensing about 10,000 gallons daily.

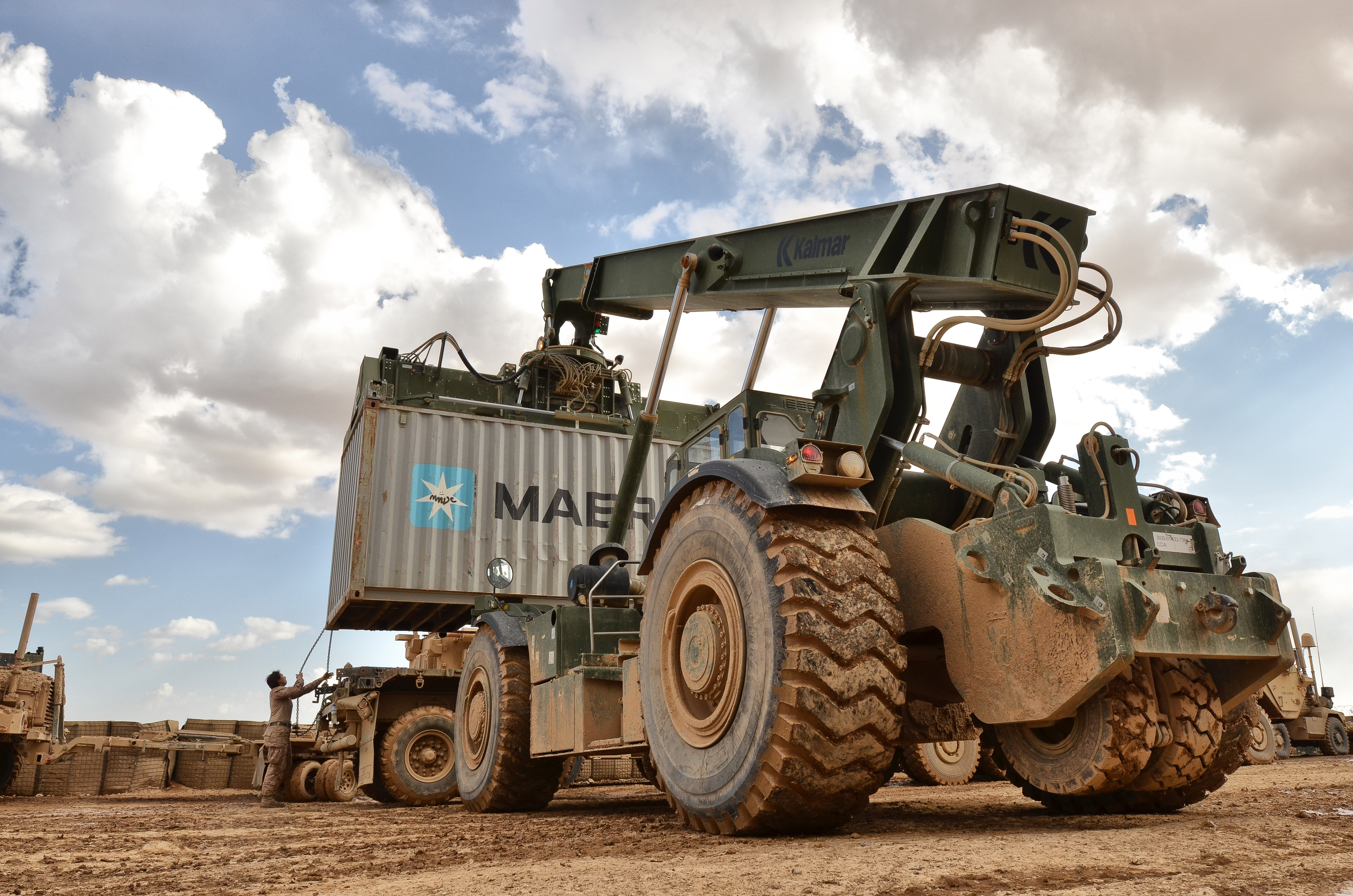
A container handler off-loads a shipping container at FOB Edinburgh on April 22, 2012, during a six-day logistics patrol.

== See also ==
- List of ISAF installations in Afghanistan
- Ross Kemp in Afghanistan
