= JTAC =

JTAC may refer to:

- JTAC Hill, a fort in Helmand Province, Afghanistan
- Joint Terrorism Analysis Centre, advises the UK government on terrorist threats
- Joint Terminal Attack Controller, someone who directs aircraft in a military operation
- Advanced Mobile Phone System#TACS.2C ETACS and JTAC variants, an analogue mobile phone standard, also known Japanese Total Access Communication
- Juniper Networks Technical Assistance Center
- Journal of Thermal Analysis and Calorimetry, a scientific journal
