= Patrol Base Rahim =

Patrol Base Rahim ~~FOB Rahim~~ ~~FOB Sandford~~
- Helmand Province in Afghanistan

Site information
- Owner: International Security Assistance Force (ISAF)
- Operator: British Army (2007-2012); Royal Marines (RM) (2007-2010); Afghan National Army (ANA); Royal Danish Army (RDA)

Location
- Shown within Afghanistan
- Coordinates: 32°03′39″N 064°51′11″E

Site history
- Built: 2007
- In use: 2007-2012

Airfield information
- Elevation: 921 metres (3,022 ft) AMSL
Helipads
Number	Length and surface
01	Concrete

Patrol Base Rahim was an International Security Assistance Force (ISAF) Patrol Base (PB) operated by the British Army and located in Nahri Saraj District, Helmand Province, Afghanistan.

== History ==
The patrol base was built in 2007 by the British Army and named after L/Cpl Paul "Sandy" Sandford, who fell in battle on 6 June 2007.

- The first Danish soldiers in Sandford arrived on 4 August 2007.
- The Danish forces have had regular units in the camp, both infantry and units from CIMIC.
- The Leopard 2 platoon during March 2007.
- In January 2010, changed Sandford to Rahim.

The following units were posted here at some point:

- Operation Herrick IX (October 2008 - April 2009)
- Operation Herrick X (April 2009 – October 2009)
- Operation Herrick XI (October 2009 - April 2010)
- Operation Herrick XII (April 2010 - October 2010)
  - C Company, 1st Battalion, The Mercian Regiment.
- Operation Herrick XIII (October 2010 - April 2011)
  - 4th Company of the 1st Battalion, Irish Guards.
- Operation Herrick XIV (April 2011 – October 2011)
  - A Company, 3rd Battalion, The Mercian Regiment.
- Operation Herrick XV (October 2011 - April 2012)
  - B Company, 1st Battalion, The Yorkshire Regiment.
  - 37 Armoured Engineer Squadron, 35 Engineer Regiment between September 2011 and March 2012.
- Operation Herrick XVI (April - October 2012)
  - Number 2 Company, 1st Battalion, Grenadier Guards.

Dismantled and cleared Oct 2012

== See also ==
- List of ISAF installations in Afghanistan
