= Forward Operating Base Arnhem =

Former operating base in Helmand, Afghanistan

FOB Arnhem
- Nahri Saraj District, Helmand Province in Afghanistan

Site information
- Owner: International Security Assistance Force (ISAF)
- Operator: British Army; Royal Danish Army (RDA); Afghan National Army (ANA)

Location
- Shown within Afghanistan
- Coordinates: 31°37′23″N 064°22′53″E

Site history
- Built: July - August 2007
- Built by: 20 Field Squadron, 36 Engineer Regiment; 4 Logistics Support Regiment RLC
- In use: August 2007 - 2010

Forward Operating Base Arnhem or more simply FOB Arnhem is a former International Security Assistance Force (ISAF) Forward operating base which was located in Nahri Saraj District, Helmand Province, Afghanistan.

== History ==
The base was originally established by members of the Ministry of Defence and used by British units under Operation Herrick.

== Units ==
It has been used by:

- Operation Herrick VI - 12th Mechanized Brigade (April 2007 - October 2007):
  - 5th Scout Squad (RDA)
  - 3 Company, 1st Battalion, Grenadier Guards, Operational Mentoring and Liaison Team (OMLT).

2 Platoon, Somme Coy. London Regiment

  - Right Flank, 1st Battalion, Scots Guards.
- Operation Herrick VII - 52nd Infantry Brigade (October 2007 - April 2008):
  - 2nd Battalion, the Yorkshire Regiment OMLT.

Possibly destroyed December 2007.

== See also ==
- Operation Herrick order of battle
- List of ISAF installations in Afghanistan
