= Forward Operating Base Jackson =

FOB Jackson FOB Sabit Qadam
- IATA: none; ICAO: none

Summary
- Airport type: Military
- Owner: International Security Assistance Force (ISAF)
- Operator: United States Marine Corps (USMC); Formerly: British Army & Royal Marines
- Location: Helmand Province, Afghanistan
- Built: 2006
- In use: 2006-2010 UK; 2010-2014 United States
- Coordinates: 32°04′33″N 064°49′55″E
- Interactive map of FOB Jackson; FOB Sabit Qadam

Helipads
Number	Length		Surface
Number	ft	m	Surface
01		25	Dirt

Forward Operating Base Jackson (FOB Jackson) was a military base used by both British and US forces located at west of Sangin Village, Sangin District, Helmand Province, Afghanistan.

The FOB was named after British soldier Private Damien 'Jacko' Jackson of the 3rd Battalion, Parachute Regiment who was killed in Sangin in 2006.

It was initially used by the British Armed Forces as part of Operation Herrick (OP H) before being turned to the United States Marine Corps (USMC) during 2010.

In early 2012, FOB Jackson was renamed FOB Sabit Qadam by Coalition forces.

== History ==
It has been used by:

- OP H IV - 16 Air Assault Brigade (May 2006 - November 2006):
- OP H V - 3 Commando Brigade (November 2006 - April 2007):
- OP H VI - 12th Mechanized Brigade (April 2007 - October 2007):
- OP H VII - 52nd Infantry Brigade (October 2007 - April 2008):
- OP H VIII - 16 Air Assault Brigade (April 2008 - October 2008):
  - 2nd Battalion, Parachute Regiment HQ
  - Ranger Company, Royal Irish Regiment attached to 2 PARA.
- OP H IX - 3 Commando Brigade (October 2008 - April 2009):
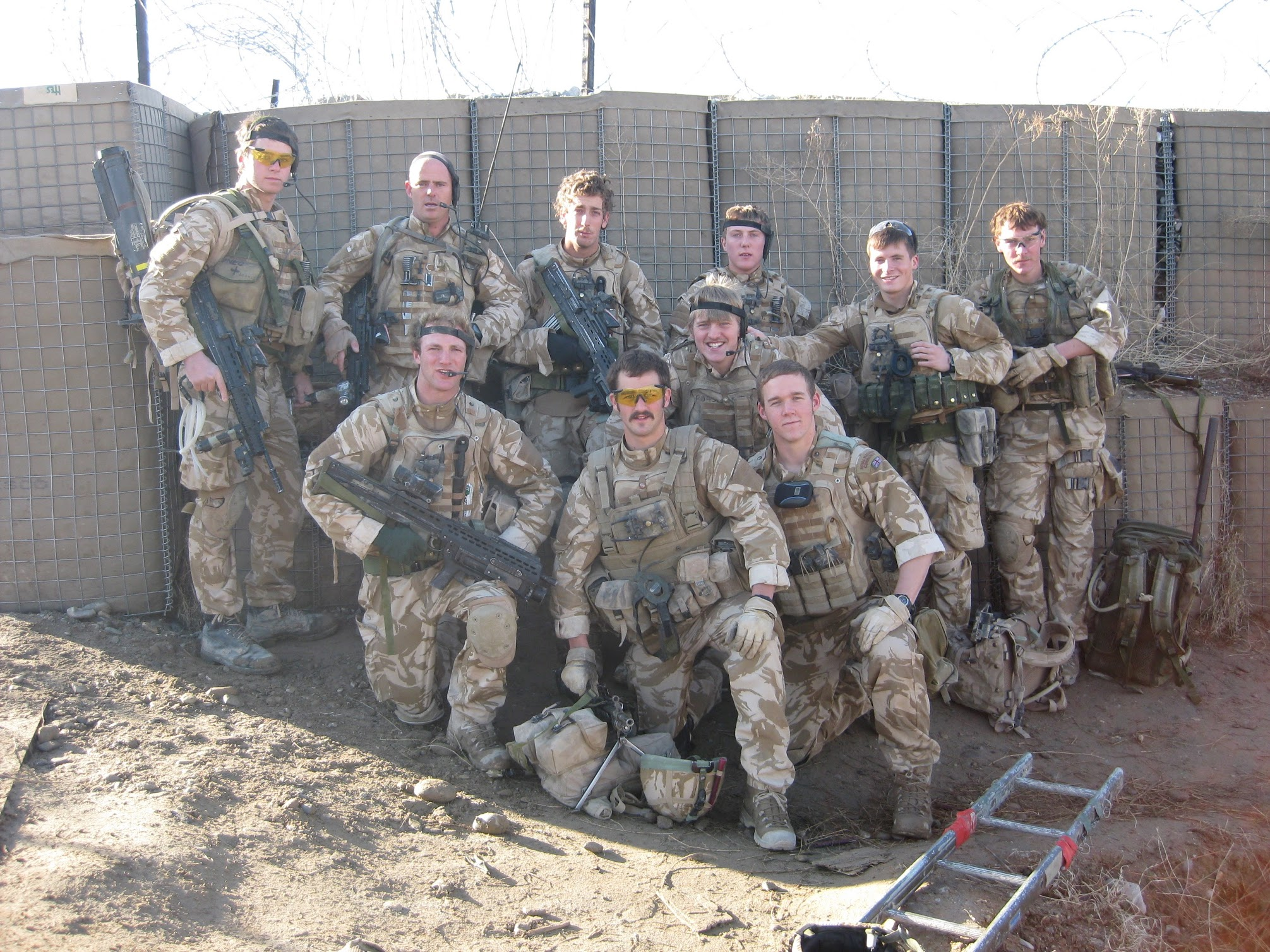
  2 Tp, W Coy, 45 Cdo RM - Sangin 2009
  - 45 Commando, Royal Marines
    - Whiskey Company (with one troop each from Yankey, X-Ray and Zulu Companies to form Operations Company (Ops Coy))
- OP H X - 19th Light Brigade (April 2009 - October 2009):
  - 2nd Battalion, The Rifles
    - Alpha Company
- OP H XI - 11 Light Brigade (October 2009 - April 2010):
- OP H XII - 4th Mechanized Brigade (April 2010 - October 2010):
  - 40 Commando, Royal Marines
- 3rd Battalion 7th Marines between October 2010 until 2011.
- 3rd Battalion 5th Marines
- 1st Battalion 5th Marines
- 3rd Battalion 7th Marines
- 3rd Battalion 4th Marines (2013)
- 2nd Battalion 7th Marines
- Charley Company, 1st Battalion 7th Marines

== See also ==
- List of ISAF installations in Afghanistan
