= Forward Operating Base Lagman =

FOB Lagman
- Qalati Ghilji, Zabul Province in Afghanistan

Site information
- Owner: International Security Assistance Force (ISAF)
- Operator: United States Armed Forces; Romanian Armed Forces

Location
- Shown within Afghanistan
- Coordinates: 32°07′48″N 66°55′47″E

Site history
- Built: 2004
- In use: 2004-unknown

Airfield information
- Elevation: 1,597 metres (5,240 ft) AMSL
Runways
Direction	Length and surface
00/00	Asphalt

Forward Operating Base Lagman, simply known as FOB Lagman, was a forward operating base in Qalati Ghilji, Zabul Province, Afghanistan that was operated by both the United States and Romanian Armed Forces.

The base was the main FOB for both the United States and Romania in Zabul Province and was named after Staff Sgt. Anthony Lagman, a soldier from Yonkers, N.Y. who was killed in action in 2004.

== History ==
The site that would eventually become Forward Operating Base Lagman was originally an abandoned mud shack to the east of the large hill-top fortress overlooking the town of Qalat. Elements of Alpha Company, 2-22nd Infantry Regiment, 2nd Brigade Combat Team (10th Mountain Division) first surrounded the mud shack with a rudimentary barrier of concertina wire and guard positions in a sparse firebase position. Over their remaining deployment, this firebase was slowly built up with mortar positions, raised guard shacks, sandbag bunkers, and a large tent for sleeping.

Nearing the end of 2nd Brigade Combat Team's 2003 - 2004 deployment rotation, the firebase was officially named after Staff Sgt. Anthony Lagman, who died during a combat operation in the village of Miam Do in March 2004. At the end of 2nd Brigade Combat Team's 2003-2004 deployment rotation, the firebase was turned over to elements of 3rd Brigade Combat Team, 25th Infantry Division (Light).

The base was home to:

- EOD response teams from the 706th Ordnance Company (EOD) January 2004 until July 2004
- 926th Engineer Battalion Bravo Company (US Army Reserve) July 2004 until March 2005
- 926th Engineer Battalion Charlie Company (US Army Reserve) March 2005 until March 2006 (This unit would become infamous for the report that two Soldiers of the unit had abused a detainee.)
- A detachment of Naval Mobile Construction Battalion Seven (NMCB 7)
- 2nd Battalion, 35th Infantry Regiment until 10 April 2005.
- 2nd Battalion, 503rd Infantry Regiment from 10 April 2005.
- Elements of 1st Battalion, 325th Air Infantry Regiment, 82nd Airborne Division for help with Afghan Elections.
- 70th Engineer Battalion Bravo Company RCP 6 2007-2008
- Elements of B CO 1/158th Inf. (3rd PLT) Arizona National Guard (part of the PRT mission providing security for Civil Affairs team) 03/2007 to 03/2008.
- Elements of the 28th Infantry Division, Pennsylvania National Guard, as the Security Force of the Provincial Reconstruction Team from March 2008 to November 2008.
- 206th Engineers, RCP 6, Kentucky Army National Guard March 2008- Feb. 2009
- 951st Engineer Company (Sapper), RCP 6, Wisconsin National Guard Feb. 2009-Sept. 2009 (relocated to FOB Shank)
- 1st Battalion, 4th Infantry Regiment sometime between July 2006 and January 2011.
- Elements of 2nd Battalion, 82nd Airborne Division Combat Aviation Battalion and with attachments of 1st Battalion, 285th Aviation Recon. Battalion (Arizona Army National Guard) QRF E.Co. Fueler and Ammo Sections (2007) Operation Enduring Freedom 8
- HQ 2nd Stryker Cavalry Regiment 2010-2011
- Elements of the 422nd Expeditionary Signal Battalion, Nevada Army National Guard, 2011-2012
- 812th Infantry Battalion (Romania).
- Elements of 3rd Stryker Brigade Combat Team, 2nd Infantry Division from December 2011
- Elements of the 7th Infantry Division.
- Task Force 1-41 FA, 1st Armored Brigade Combat Team, 3rd Infantry Division - January 2013
- 883rd Route Clearance Company, North Carolina Army National Guard until September 2012
- 151st Engineering Company, North Carolina Army National Guard from September 2012.
- 870th Engineer Company (Sapper), Florida Army National Guard, from August 2012 - June 2013.
- Security Forces Assistance Team 21, 29th Infantry Brigade Combat Team during November 2012
- 787th Ordnance Company (Explosive Ordnance Disposal), 3rd Ordnance Battalion from March 2012
- 618th Engineer Support Company (Airborne) January 2010 - December 2010
- 1-41 FA, 1st Armored Brigade Combat Team, 3rd Infantry Division from Ft Stewart GA were the last to occupy the FOB before transferring the site to Afghan security forces.

== See also ==
- List of ISAF installations in Afghanistan
