= Forward Operating Base Shank =

Forward operating base of U.S. military

Forward Operating Base Shank (FOB Dahlke) (Camp Dahlke West)
- Logar Province in Afghanistan
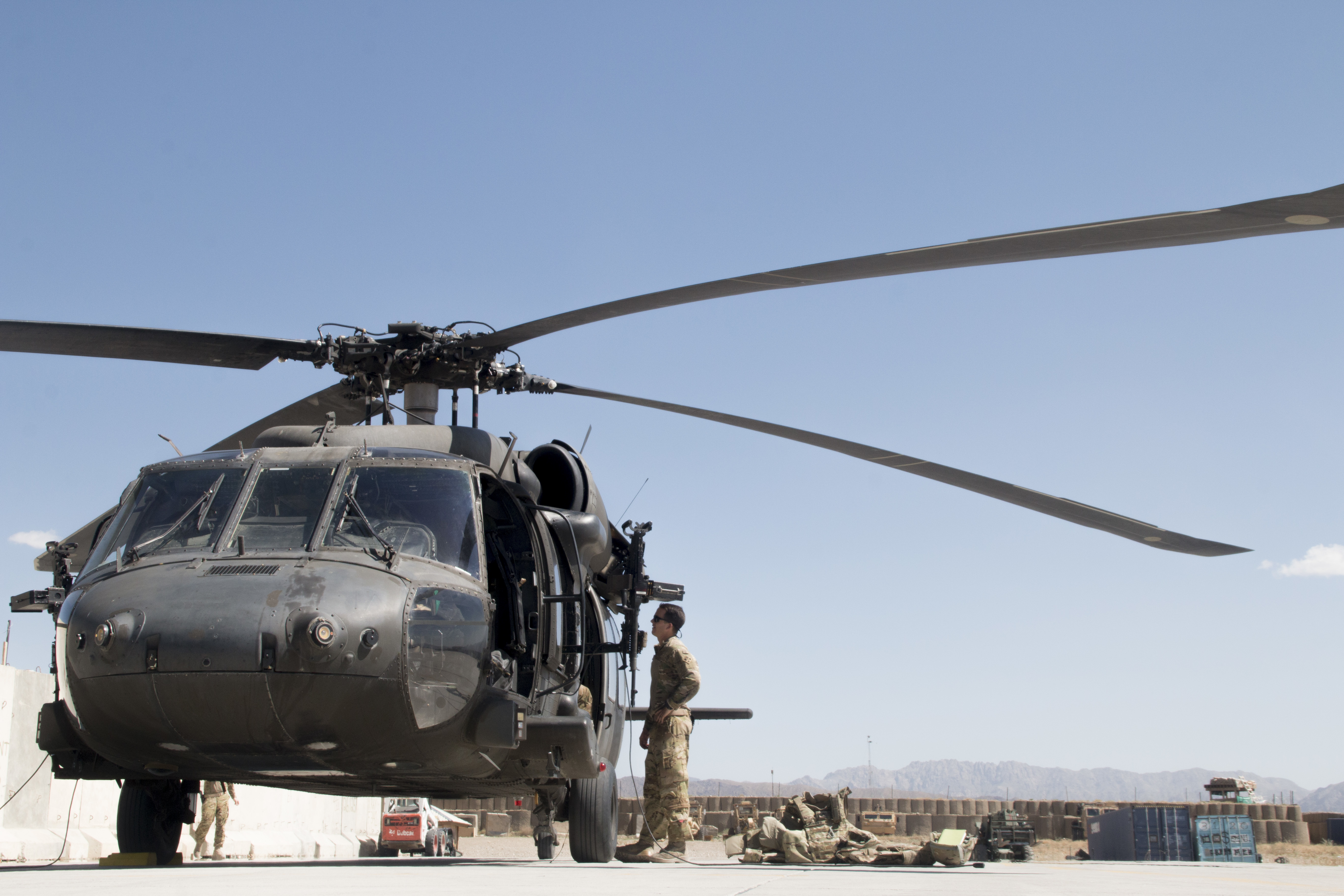

Site information
- Type: FOB
- Owner: Resolute Support Mission (RS)
- Operator: United States Armed Forces; Afghan National Security Forces

Location
- Shown within Afghanistan
- Coordinates: 33°55′19″N 69°04′41″E

Site history
- Built: 2008
- In use: 2008–2021

Airfield information
- Identifiers: IATA: OAA, ICAO: OASH
- Elevation: 2,016 metres (6,614 ft) AMSL
Runways
Direction	Length and surface
16L/34R	2,094 metres (6,870 ft) Asphalt
15/33 (UAV)	370 metres (1,214 ft) Asphalt
Helipads
Number	Length and surface
16R/34L	610 metres (2,001 ft) Asphalt
17/35	400 metres (1,312 ft) Asphalt

Forward Operating Base Shank (IATA: OAA, ICAO: OASH, also known as Rocket City) was a forward operating base of the U.S. military, located in Logar Province of eastern Afghanistan, about 12 km south-east of the city of Baraki Barak. During Operation Enduring freedom, FOB Shank was one of the most heavily rocketed forward operating bases in Afghanistan. In 2014, the base was turned over to Afghan National Army, who established Camp Maiwand at the northern end of the FOB. American forces later returned and reoccupied the southern portion of the FOB, under the name Camp Dahlke.

== History ==
In 2008 FOB Shank was built by Alpha Company of the 508th Special Troops Battalion of the 82nd Airborne Division with assistance from the 555th Engineer Battalion. The FOB was dedicated after SSG Michael A. Shank, who was killed in the Logar Province in 2006. International Security Assistance Force (ISAF) used the base to train the Afghan National Police (ANP). The Police Academy, led by a U.S. Police Mentoring Training team, cooperated daily with the Czech Provincial Reconstruction Team Logar, composed of 200 Czech Soldiers and about 10 civilians.

These efforts were focused on training the Afghanistan National Auxiliary Police to become members of the ANP.

As of 8 July 2008, Czech and Afghan instructors were teaching the fourth group of cadets at the academy. Each group attended a three-week cycle which included first-aid treatment, tactics, patrolling, weapons training, vehicle-check-point procedures and many other police-related subjects. The practical part of the training also included scenarios where cadets were ambushed by simulated oppositional forces.

During 2014 the base was downsized partly by 663 Engineer Company (cbt hvy)and was turned over to the ANA. The ANA utilized the northern portion of the base only, which they renamed Camp Maiwand.

The last few convoys containing equipment from FOB Shank back to Bagram Airbase were completed during October 2014 by the 730th Transportation Company, 419th Combat Sustainment Support Battalion, 4th Resolute Support Sustainment Brigade.

Following the shutdown of FOB Shank, a new American base was established at the southern end of the perimeter, called FOB Dahlke or Camp Dahlke. Camp Dahlke was expanded in 2018 to support the deployment of the 1st Security Force Assistance Brigade. Camp Dahlke had facilities to house 1200 personnel.

== Deployed units ==
Aviation

- October 2008-October 2009
  - 101st Airborne 159th Aviation Brigade "Task Force Thunder" under Col. Ronald Lewis / 4-101 "Task Force Wings" under Lt. Col James Benson.
- October 2009–October 2010
  - 3rd Infantry Division 4-3 AVN Battalion "BRAWLER" under Lt. Col Ault
- December 2008-December 2009
  - 710BSB 3RD IBCT 10th MTN
- 2010–2010
  - 10th Mountain
    - Company D, 2nd Battalion, 30th Infantry Regiment, 4th Infantry Brigade Combat Team
- April 2011
  - 10th Combat Aviation Brigade
    - Company F, 2nd Battalion (Aviation Support)
- August 2011–August 2012
  - 82nd Combat Aviation Brigade (TF Corsair)
    - Unknown Company, 3rd Battalion
    - All Companies, 2nd Battalion, 82nd Aviation Regiment (UH-60M)
    - Company B, 3rd Battalion, 82nd Aviation Regiment (CH-47F)
    - Company B, 2nd Battalion, 135th Aviation Regiment (CH-47)
    - Company F, 1st Attack Battalion, 1st Air Combat Brigade, 227th Aviation Regiment, 1st Cavalry Division (Gray Eagle) (3/2012 – 03/2013) – first unit to operate Gray Eagle at Shank. This company was deployed as a standalone company and attached to the 82nd Airborne Division upon arrival to Shank. After TF Corsair left, F 227 was attached to the incoming unit until its tour of duty was completed.
    - Elements of 122nd Aviation Support Battalion
- August 2012-January 2013
  - 173rd ABCT (TF Bayonet)
- June – December 2013
  - 10th Combat Aviation Brigade (TF Knighthawk)
    - Headquarters and Headquarters Company, 2nd Assault Battalion, 10th Aviation Regiment
    - Company C, 2nd Assault Battalion, 10th Aviation Regiment (UH-60M)
    - Company E, 2nd Assault Battalion, 10th Aviation Regiment (Aviation Support)
    - Company A, 2nd Assault Battalion, 10th Aviation Regiment (AH-64)
    - Company B, 3rd General Support Aviation Battalion, 10th Aviation Regiment (CH-47F)
    - Company C, 3rd General Support Aviation Battalion, 10th Aviation Regiment (HH-60M)
- December 2013–August 2014

Taskforce Wings 4-101 Aviation Regiment

  - Taskforce Lift
    - Company C (DUSTOFF), 7-101 General Support Aviation Battalion, 159th Combat Aviation Brigade, 101 Airborne Division
    - 6-101 Aviation Battalion, 159th Combat Aviation Brigade, 101 Airborne Division
- 2014
  - 82nd Combat Aviation Brigade (TF Pegasus)
    - Company E, 1st Attack Reconnaissance Battalion, 82nd Aviation Regiment (UH-60)
    - Company F, 2nd Attack Helicopter Battalion, 82nd Aviation Regiment
    - Company B, 3rd General Support Helicopter Battalion, 82nd Aviation Regiment using the Boeing CH-47F Chinook
    - Company B, 122nd Aviation Support Battalion
- October 2014
  - Company B, 1st General Support Aviation Battalion, 169th Aviation Regiment (CH-47)
- May 2016 – Unknown
  - 40th Combat Aviation Brigade
    - Company C, 1st Battalion, 104th Aviation Regiment (DUSTOFF)
    - Company F, 2nd Battalion, 238th Aviation Regiment (UH-60)
    - Company B, 1st Battalion, 140th Aviation Regiment
    - 1st Battalion, 10th Aviation Regiment (AH-64)
- 2018
  - 101st Combat Aviation Brigade (TF Eagle Assault)
    - 5th Battalion, 101st Aviation Regiment (CH-47, UH-60, AH-64E)
    - Company B, 3rd General Support Battalion, 25th Aviation Regiment (CH47F)
- 2019
  - 1st Armored Division, Combat Aviation Brigade (TF Apocalypse)
    - 3rd Battalion (UH-60)
  - 16th Combat Aviation Brigade, B Company (CH-47) "Sugarbears"
  - 1st Combat Aviation Brigade, 1-1 Attack Battalion, Bravo Company (AH-64E) "Wolf Pack" "LUOFY"
  - 2-10 Combat Aviation Brigade, 10th Mountain Division

Ground forces

- A, B and C Companies, 710th Brigade Support Battalion, 3rd Brigade Combat Team, 10th Mountain Division between December 2008 and 2009 and December 2009.
- Alpha Battery, 4th Battalion, 319th Airborne Field Artillery Regiment, 173rd Airborne Brigade Combat Team during July 2012.
  - M777 howitzer
  - M119 howitzer
- Elements of 919th ICTC, 103rd Sustainment Command from 2010 to 2011
- 2nd Battalion - 30th Infantry Regiment, 4th Brigade Combat Team, 10th Mountain Division from October 2010 to October 2011.
- A Co, 1st Battalion – 41st Infantry Regiment, 3rd Infantry Brigade Combat Team, 1st Armored Division during 2011–2012.
- 3rd Infantry Brigade Combat Team, 1st Armored Division from Fort Bliss, Tx, from 2011 to 2012.
- 628th Forward Surgical Team, from San Antonio, Tx, 2011–2012
- Elements of 427th BSB (NY ARNG) attached to 401st AFSB during 2011–2012
- 1st Squadron (Airborne) 91st Cavalry, 173rd Airborne Brigade Combat Team, June 2012–March 2013.
- 102nd Sapper Company, 307th Engineer Battalion, June 2012- March 2013
- Naval Mobile Construction Battalion 14 Detachment 2, August 2012-February 2013
- 6th Squadron, 8th Cavalry Regiment, 4th Infantry Brigade Combat Team, 3rd Infantry Division, March 2013–November 2013.
- Bravo Company "Mongoose Bravo" 1st Battalion, 5th Cavalry Regiment, 2nd Brigade Combat Team, August 2013–March 2014
- 710th Brigade Support Battalion and 2nd Battalion, 87th Infantry Regiment, 3rd Brigade Combat Team, 10th Mountain Division between October 2013 and July 2014
- 388th Clearance Company, January 2014–October 2014.
- B CO, 1st Battalion – 502nd Infantry Regiment, 2nd Brigade Combat Team, 101st Airborne (Air Assault) Division during January 2014–October 2014.
- 2nd Squadron 3rd Cavalry Regiment between June 2014 to October 2014.
- 1982nd Forward Surgical Team during 2015.
- Alpha Battery 1st Battalion 265th ADA Regiment; 164th ADA Brigade Florida Army National Guard, June 2015–February 2016 ADA
- 389th Engineer Company, 2016–2017
- 207th Engineer Construction Company, Over The Horizon, 2017
- 136th Combat Sustainment Support Battalion during October 2017.
- 2-174 ADA C-RAM (Ohio National Guard) 2017–2018
- 659th Engineer Construction Company, Over The Horizon, 2017–2018
- 2nd Squadron 1st Cavalry Regiment, Fort Carson 2018–2019
- Elements of 495th Combat Sustainment Support Battalion 2018–2019.
- 3rd Platoon, Alpha Company, 1-38 Infantry Battalion, 1st SBCT, 4th ID. 2018–2019
- Elements of the 329th Combat Sustainment Support Battalion, TF Viking 2019–2020
- 801st Engineering Company, Over The Horizon, 2019
- 829 Engineering Company, TF Over The Horizon, 2020
- Bravo and Delta Co and Headquarters Elements of the 1st Battalion 178 Infantry Regiment (Illinois National Guard) TF Southeast, September 2019–January 2020.
- Elements of Bravo Company and HHC 1st Battalion 508th Parachute Infantry Regiment, 3BCT, 82ND ABN DIV (TF FURY), October 2019–January 2020
- 10th Mountain 1-32 Infantry

== See also ==
- List of ISAF installations in Afghanistan
