= Forward Operating Base Sarkari Karez =

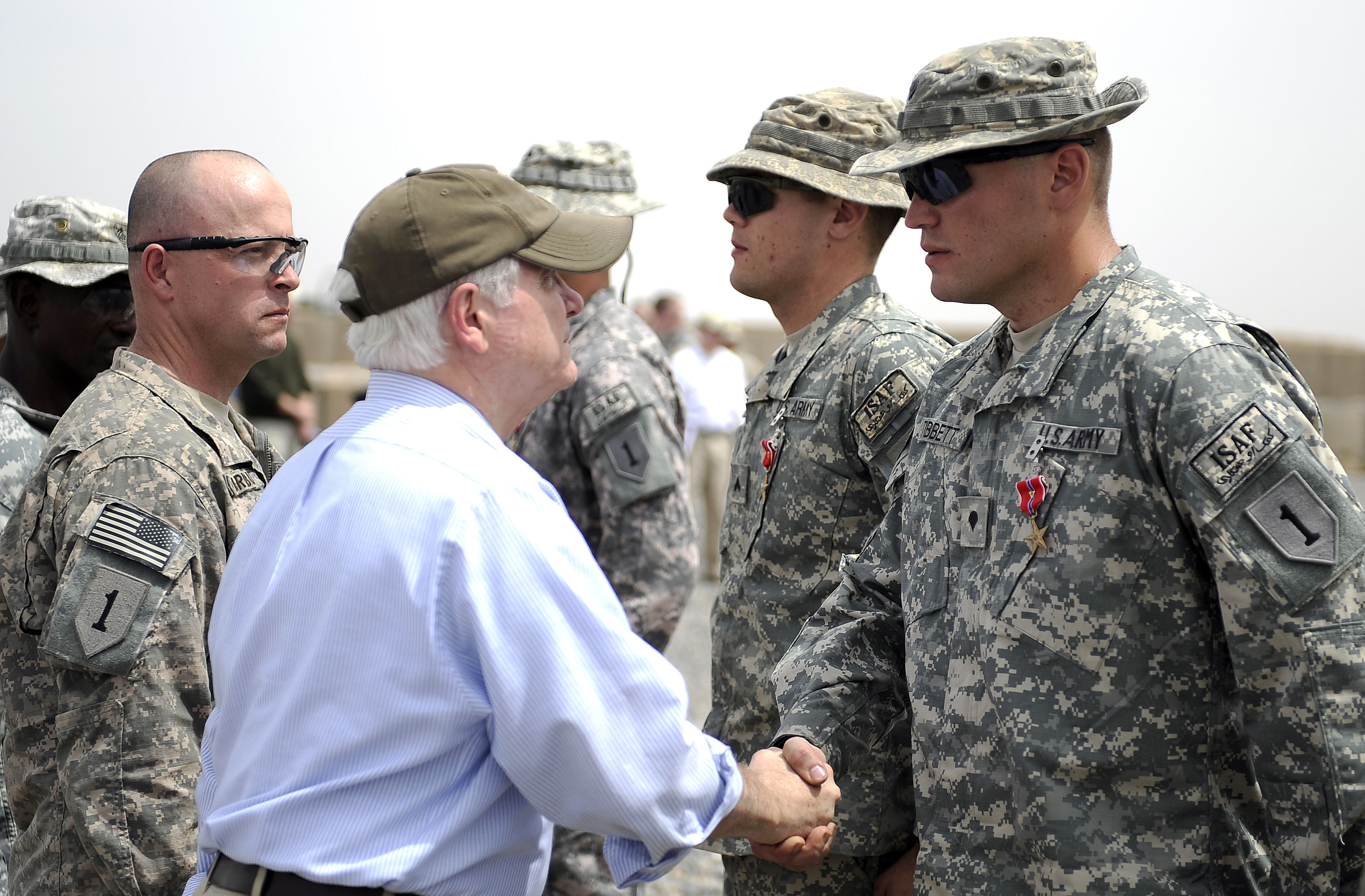
Secretary of Defense Robert M. Gates awarding medals at FOB Ramrod.

Forward Operating Base Sarkari Karez was a foreign military base in Maywand District, Kandahar Province, Afghanistan. The base was initially established, secured and named by the 2nd Battalion, 2nd Infantry "Ramrods" in 2008. It was built by the Bravo Company, 62nd Engineer Battalion based in Fort Hood. After President Barack Obama expanded the US presence in Afghanistan, several thousand U.S. Army soldiers were stationed at the base.

In June 2011, the FOB was renamed Sarkari Karez after 2nd Battalion, 34th Armor Regiment, 1st Brigade, 1st Infantry Division out of Fort Riley, Kansas assumed responsibility.

== FOB Ramrod soldiers charged with murder ==
In May 2010, an investigation into the alleged use of hashish by members of Bravo Company of the 2nd Battalion, 1st Infantry Regiment and the 5th Brigade of the 2nd Infantry Division uncovered a murder conspiring ring. Five U.S. Army soldiers were charged with killing three Afghan civilians for sport. Body parts of the victims, such as finger bones and a skull had been collected as war trophies.

== See also ==
- List of NATO installations in Afghanistan
