= Forward Operating Base Shawqat =

Former operating base in Helmand, Afghanistan

FOB Shawqat
- Helmand Province in Afghanistan
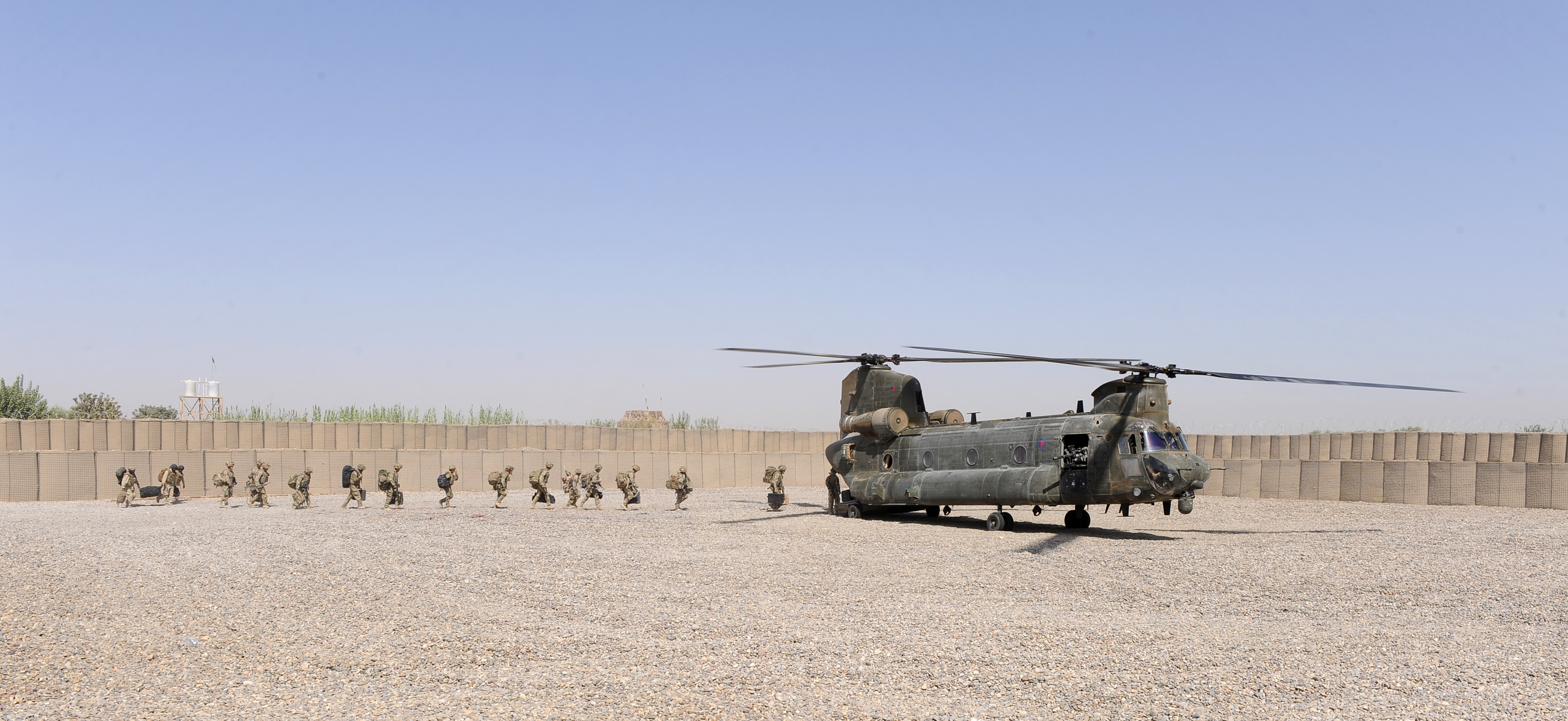

Site information
- Owner: International Security Assistance Force (ISAF)
- Operator: British Armed Forces

Location
- Shown within Afghanistan
- Coordinates: 31°38′32″N 064°14′28″E

Site history
- Built: March–September 2009
- Built by: 38 Engineer Regiment
- In use: July 2009-August 2013

Airfield information
- Elevation: 798 metres (2,618 ft) AMSL
Helipads
Number	Length and surface
00	Concrete

FOB Shawqat was an International Security Assistance Force (ISAF) Forward Operating Base (FOB) operated by the British Armed Forces and located in Nad Ali District, Helmand Province, Afghanistan. The FOB was established on the site of a British Built mud brick fort dating from the Anglo-Afghan Wars.

The base was used under Operation Herrick (OP H).

== History ==
It has been used by:

- OP H X - 19th Light Brigade (April 2009 - October 2009):
  - 1st Battalion, Welsh Guards
    - Battlegroup HQ
    - Prince of Wales's Company
  - 4th Battalion, The Rifles
    - R Company
- OP H XI - 11 Light Brigade (October 2009 - April 2010):
- OP H XII - 4th Mechanized Brigade (April 2010 - October 2010):
- OP H XIII - 16 Air Assault Brigade (October 2010 - April 2011):
  - 1st Battalion, Royal Irish Regiment
    - B Company
  - 16 Medical Regiment, RAMC
  - 2 Royal Tank Regiment - Cyclops
  - 51 Parachute Squadron, Royal Engineers
- OP H XIV - 3 Commando Brigade: (April 2011 - October 2011)
  - 45 Commando
    - Whiskey Company
- OP H XV - 20th Armoured Brigade (October 2011 - April 2012):
- OP H XVI - 12th Mechanized Brigade: (April 2012 - October 2012)
  - 1st Battalion, The Royal Anglian Regiment
- OP H XVII - 4th Mechanized Brigade (October 2012 - April 2013):
  - Royal Scots Borderers, 1st Battalion The Royal Regiment of Scotland
      - Delta Company
    - 21 Royal Engineer Regiment, 4 Squadron
  - 22 Engineer Regiment
- OP H XVIII - 1st Mechanized Brigade (April 2013 - October 2013):
  - 2nd Battalion, The Duke of Lancaster's Regiment

The base was closed down during August 2013.

== See also ==
- List of ISAF installations in Afghanistan
