= Forward Operating Base Zeebrugge =

Former operating base in Helmand, Afghanistan

FOB Zeebrugge ~~COB Zeebrugge~~
- Kajaki District, Helmand Province in Afghanistan
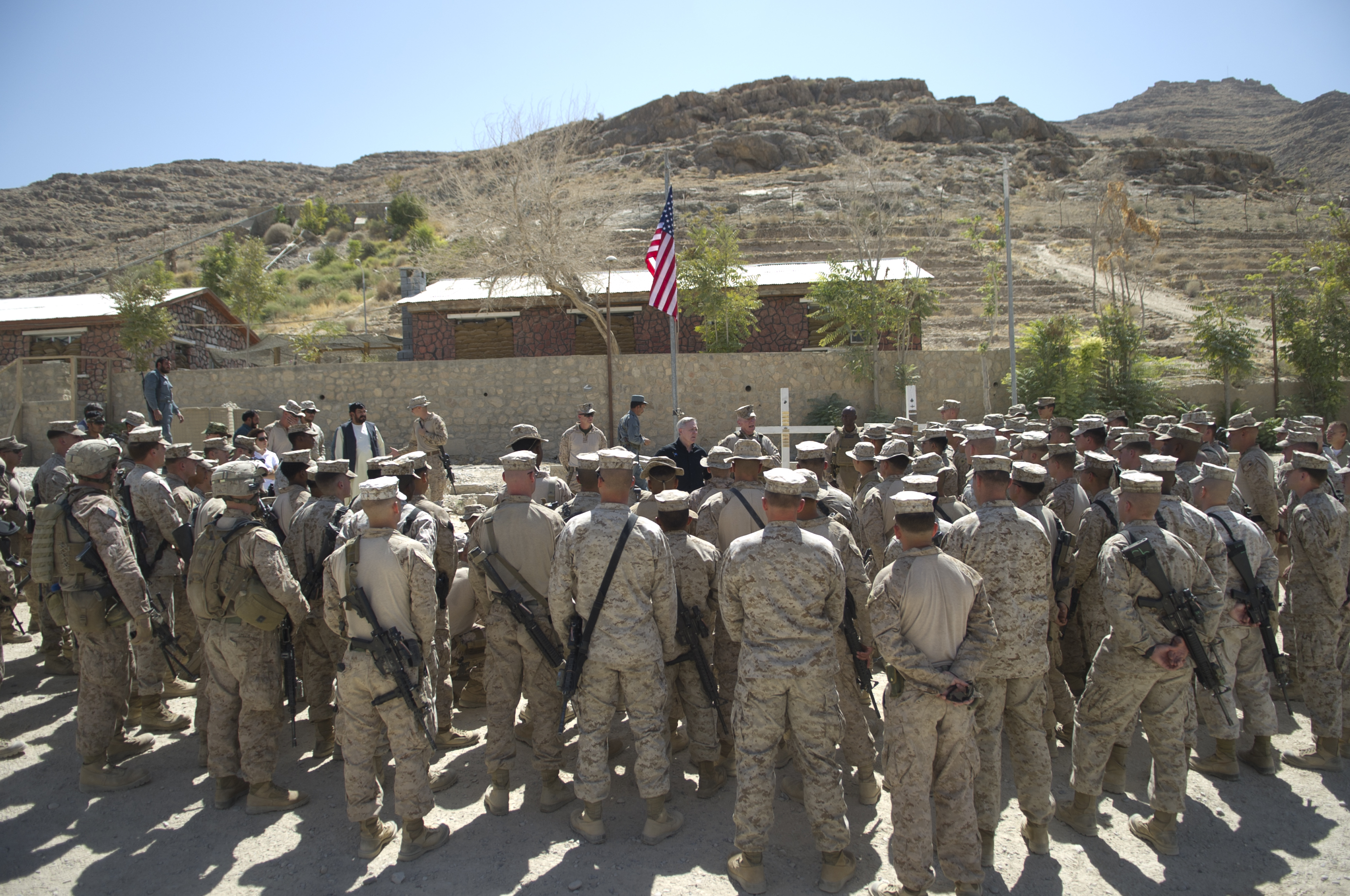
- Soldiers at FOB Zeebrugge in 2011

Site information
- Type: forward operating base
- Owner: International Security Assistance Force (ISAF)
- Operator: British Army (2006–June 2010); Royal Marines (2006–June 2010); United States Marine Corps (June 2010–Dec 2013)

Location
- Shown within Afghanistan
- Coordinates: 32°19′21″N 65°6′20″E

Site history
- Built: 2006
- In use: 2006-December 2013

Airfield information
- Elevation: 921 metres (3,022 ft) AMSL
Helipads
| Number | Length and surface |
|---|---|
| 00 | Concrete |

FOB Zeebrugge is a former International Security Assistance Force (ISAF) Forward Operating Base (FOB) initially operated by the British Army and the Royal Marines under Operation Herrick (OP H) before being transferred to the United States Marine Corps and located in Kajaki District, Helmand Province, Afghanistan.

== Units ==
- OP H VII (November 2007 - April 2008)
  - 40 Commando, Royal Marines
    - Charlie Company
- June 2010 - November 2010
  - 3rd Battalion, 12th Marine Regiment
    - India Battery
- From November 2010 - May 2011
  - 1st Battalion, 10th Marine Regiment
    - Bravo Battery
- From May 2011 to November 2011
  - 2nd Battalion, 12th Marine Regiment
    - Echo Battery
  - 1st Battalion, 12th Marine Regiment
    - 2nd Platoon, Charlie Battery
- From November 2011 - May 2012
  - 2nd Battalion, 11th Marine Regiment
    - Golf Battery
- From May 2012
  - 2nd Battalion, 10th Marines
    - Fox Battery
  - 1st Battalion, 1st Marines (later joined by 1st Squad, 2nd Platoon)
    - 3rd Platoon Alpha Company
  - 2nd Battalion, 7th Marines
  - 1st Battalion, 8th Marines
- From Feb 2012 - Sept 2013
  - 3rd Battalion, 4th Marine Regiment (Weapons Co.)
  - Embedded Training Team Kajaki - Afghan Police Advisor (H&S Co. 1 MEF/MHG)
  - 1st MSOB (MARSOC Raider BN 8123)

Observation Posts Athens and Shrine were nearby.

== See also ==
- List of ISAF installations in Afghanistan
