= Forward Operating Base Arian =

Former forward operating base in Afghanistan

FOB Arian
- Ghazni, Ghazni Province in Afghanistan
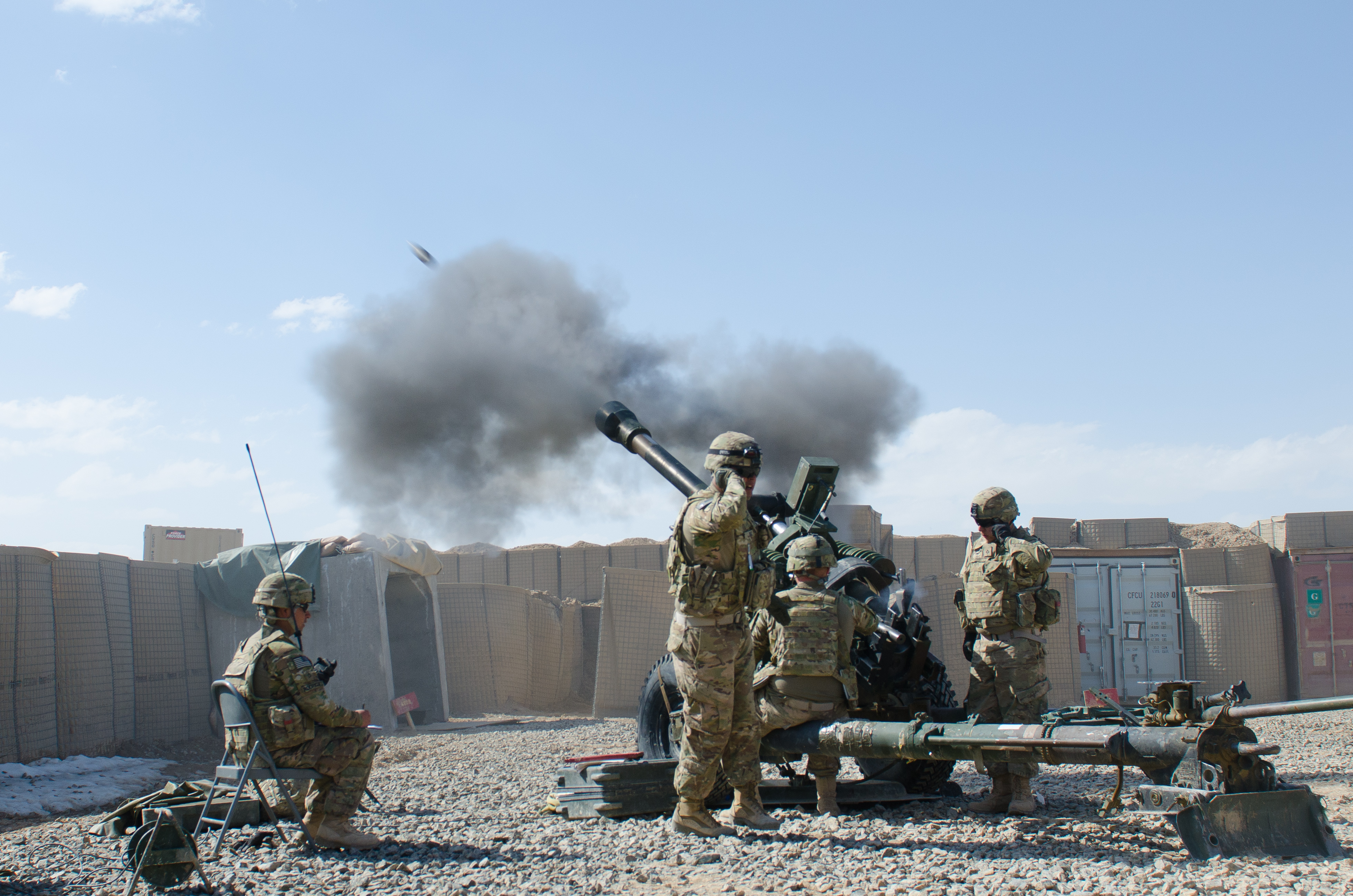
- U.S. soldiers with Alpha Battery, 3rd Battalion, 6th Field Artillery Regiment conduct training with the M119 105 mm howitzer

Site information
- Type: Forward operating base
- Owner: International Security Assistance Force (ISAF)
- Operator: United States Armed Forces; Afghan National Army

Location
- Shown within Afghanistan
- Coordinates: 33°30′16″N 68°24′38″E

Site history
- Built: 2005
- In use: 2005-2013

Airfield information
Helipads
Number	Length and surface
01	30m x 30m Asphalt
02	30m x 30m Asphalt

Forward Operating Base Arian was a forward operating base operated by the International Security Assistance Force (ISAF). It was originally Combat Operating Post Arian, but in 2011 rapidly expanded to forward operating base size. It was in Ghazni Province, Afghanistan.

Deployed units

- 2nd Battalion, 504th Parachute Infantry Regiment, 1st Brigade Combat Team, 82nd Airborne Division (2012-)
- 307th Brigade Support Battalion, 82nd Airborne Division (2012-)
- Bravo Battery, 3rd Battalion 319 Airborne Field Artillery Regiment, 82 Airborne Division (2012-)
- 6th Kandak, 3rd Brigade, 203rd Corps (2012)
- Alpha Battery, 3rd Battalion, 6th Field Artillery Regiment (2013)

== See also ==
- List of NATO installations in Afghanistan
- List of Afghan Armed Forces installations
