= JTAC Hill =

Former British military installation in Helmand Province, Afghanistan

JTAC Hill ("Joint Terminal Attack Controller" Hill) was a British Armed Forces installation in Helmand Province, Afghanistan.

JTAC Hill was originally built in 1841 by the Royal Engineers for the tactical defence of British India. It was later strengthened and used as a strategic base during the War in Afghanistan, serving as a point for forward air controllers to guide and coordinate military aircraft in the region. JTAC Hill served as the southernmost British stronghold in Helmand Province, almost 100 miles south of the main British base, Camp Bastion, and just forty miles north of the frontier with Pakistan.

Following the British withdrawal from Afghanistan in 2014, the fate of JTAC Hill was left unknown, though it was likely decommissioned. As of the collapse of the Islamic Republic of Afghanistan following the Taliban's offensive and takeover in 2021, JTAC Hill is believed to no longer exist.

== Prince Harry ==
On 28 February 2008, the American news aggregator Drudge Report reported that Prince Harry, Duke of Sussex, then a junior officer of the Household Cavalry, was operating as a Forward Air Controller on JTAC Hill with a Gurkha unit. The United Kingdom Ministry of Defence had made agreements with the news media of the United Kingdom and some other countries not to reveal that the prince was there until he came home or until the news was otherwise released. An Australian weekly women's magazine, New Idea, initially broke the story in January, but it was not followed up at the time. New Idea editors claimed ignorance of any news blackout. The Berliner Kurier had also published a short piece on 28 February 2008, before Drudge.

== See also ==
- Operation Herrick
- List of ISAF installations in Afghanistan
