= Forward Operating Base Wishtan =

FOB Wishtan ~~Patrol Base Wishtan~~
- Helmand Province in Afghanistan

Site information
- Owner: International Security Assistance Force (ISAF)
- Operator: British Army (August 2008-2010); Royal Marines (August 2008-2009); United States Marine Corps (2008)

Location
- Shown within Afghanistan
- Coordinates: 32°03′39″N 064°51′11″E

Site history
- Built: 2008
- In use: 2008-2010

Airfield information
- Elevation: 921 metres (3,022 ft) AMSL
Helipads
Number	Length and surface
00	Concrete

FOB Wishtan is an International Security Assistance Force (ISAF) Forward Operating Base (FOB) operated by the British Army and located in Sangin District, Helmand Province, Afghanistan.

== History ==
FOB Wishtan was built by Echo Company, 2nd Battalion 7th Marines, United States Marine Corps (USMC) during 2008 and was handed to the British Army during October 2008 with the first unit being Whiskey Company, 45 Commando, Royal Marines.

The following units were posted here at some point:

- Operation Enduring Freedom - Afghanistan (OEF-A)
  - Echo Company, 2nd Battalion 7th Marines, USMC until October 2008
- Operation Herrick IX (October 2008 - April 2009)
  - Whiskey Company, 45 Commando, Royal Marines
- Operation Herrick X (April – October 2009)
  - A Company, 2nd Battalion, The Rifles until June 2009
  - C Company, 2nd Battalion, The Rifles from July 2009
- Operation Herrick XI (October 2009 - April 2010)
  - B Company, 1st Battalion, The Royal Regiment of Scotland
- Operation Herrick XII (April - October 2010)
  - A Company, 1st Battalion, The Mercian Regiment (Cheshire)

== Current use ==
It was abandoned in 2010.

== See also ==
- List of ISAF installations in Afghanistan
