= Forward Operating Base Hamidullah =

Former operating base in Helmand, Afghanistan

Hamidullah Nolay
- Afghanistan

Site information
- Type: FOB
- Owner: International Security Assistance Force
- Operator: British Army; Royal Marines; United States Marine Corps; Afghan National Army

Location
- Shown within Afghanistan
- Coordinates: 32°1′59″N 64°50′2″E

Site history
- Built: 2007
- In use: 2008 - 2014

Forward Operating Base Hamidullah or more simply FOB Hamidullah is a former Forward Operating Base in Afghanistan operated by the International Security Assistance Force (ISAF) under Operation Herrick (OP H) and Operation Enduring Freedom (OEF).

It was formerly FOB Nolay.

== Units ==
- OP H 6 (June–October 2007)
- OP H 7 (October 2007 – April 2008)
- OP H 8 (April 2008 – October 2008)
- OP H 9 (October 2008 – April 2009)
  - X Company, 45 Commando
- OP H 10 (April 2009 – October 2009)
- 2nd Battalion, Royal Regiment of Fusiliers
- OP H 12 (May - October 2010)
  - Alpha Company, 40 Commando
- OEF (July 2010)
  - India Company, 3rd Battalion, 7th Marines
- OEF (December 2010)
  - Lima Company, 3rd Battalion, 5th Marines
- OEF (December 2010-January 2011)
  - Echo Company "The Greenhats", 2nd Battalion 9th Marines
- OEF (July until November 2011)
  - Bravo Company, 1st Battalion 6th Marines
- OEF (November 2011 until May 2011)
  - India Company, 3rd Battalion, 7th Marines
- OEF (February 2012)
  - Weapons Company, 3rd Battalion 7th Marines, Regimental Combat Team 6
  - 2nd Marine Logistics Group (Forward)
- OEF (July 2012)
  - 3rd Platoon, Alpha Company, 1st Battalion 1st Marines, Regimental Combat Team 6
- OEF (November 2012 until May 2014)
  - Security Force Assistance Advisor Team 2-215 with elements of the 303rd Psychological Operations Company (TPT 1622)

The base was resupplied by Alpha Company, Combat Logistics Battalion 6, 1st Marine Logistics Group (Forward) during July 2010.

The base was enhanced by Heavy Equipment Platoon, Support Company, 8th Engineer Support Battalion, 1st Marine Logistics Group (Forward) during October 2010 and by Utilities Platoon, Service Company, 8th Engineer Support Battalion, 1st Marine Logistics Group (Forward) during December 2010.

The base was reduced in size by Combat Logistics Battalion 7.

Handed over to 2nd Brigade, 215th Corps, Afghan National Army during May 2014.
