= Firebase Tinsley =

- Afghanistan
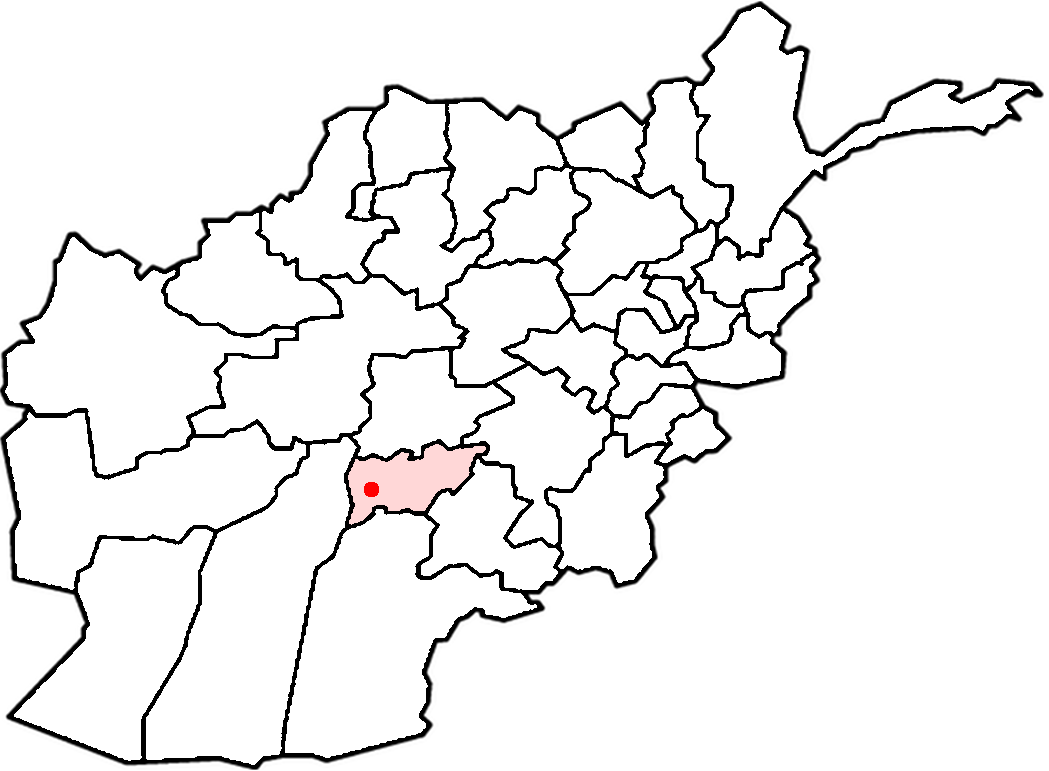
- The location of Firebase Tinsley (aka Firebase Cobra) in Oruzgan Province

Site information
- Type: Fire support base
- Condition: Abandoned

Location
- Coordinates: 32°56′37″N 65°33′59″E

Site history
- Built: 2004 by Charlie Company 2nd Battalion, 5th Infantry Regiment, 25th Infantry Division
- Battles/wars: Operation Enduring Freedom

Garrison information
- Garrison: 3rd Special Forces Group, Operational Detachment Alpha 3124, Civil Affairs Team 745 (November 2007), Charlie Company 2nd Battalion, 5th Infantry, 25th Infantry Division

Firebase Tinsley, formerly known as Firebase Cobra, was a United States military fire support base, located in Oruzgan Province in Afghanistan. This base was established by the Charlie Company "Cobras" of the 2nd Battalion, 5th Infantry who were deployed with the 25th Infantry Division (Light) out of Schofield Barracks, Hawaii. The base was named Firebase Cobra until the death of Capt. John Tinsley near there in August 2009. It was featured in National Geographic's "Inside the Green Berets" television series. The U.S. Army's 3rd Special Forces Group is stationed there. It was a joint US/AUS special operations base.

On November 2, 2007 the SF Group, and members of the Afghan National Army and Afghan National Police, left the base to get the nearby village of Sarsina, to perform a humanitarian aid and medical capabilities mission. Staff Sergeant Carlo A. Alcazar of CA 745 reported that only a few families came in for the medical treatment offered by the troops from Firebase Cobra, and that the Taliban prevented many from getting the medical service. After completing their humanitarian mission, the soldiers examined the village. “What was alarming,” said Captain Stephen P. Ward, who accompanied Alcazar and the rest of the men, “was the buildings had locks and barricaded doors, which was a clear indication that the village wasn’t abandoned, but had been turned into a defendable position." Eventually, the men discovered that the village had been evacuated and at least 300 Taliban militants were entrenched into several fighting positions in an attempt to ambush Coalition forces in the area. According to a GlobalSecurity.org report, "at one point CA 745 had to go in and rescue the Special Forces Commander who got caught between the American and Taliban lines when they reoriented their vehicles in a fighting position, eventually reaching him and pulling back."

Staff Sergeant Alcazar, Captain Ward and Sergeant First Class Drew Kimmey, another member of the group, were all honored for their action. Sgt. 1st Class. Kimmey received a Silver Star, and Staff Sgt. Alcazar and Capt. Ward both were awarded Bronze Stars.

Air Force Combat Controller Mark Andrew Forester was killed in action at Firebase Tinsley on the 29th of September, 2010 (Operation Enduring Freedom), while trying to save a fallen comrade. For his actions on that day he was posthumously awarded the Silver Star and the Purple Heart.
