= Forward Operating Base Inkerman =

Military base in Afghanistan

FOB Inkerman
- Sangin District in Afghanistan

Site information
- Type: Forward Operating Base
- Owner: International Security Assistance Force
- Operator: British Army; Royal Marines

Location
- Shown within Afghanistan
- Coordinates: 32°05′N 64°53′E

Site history
- Built: 2006
- In use: June 2007 – unknown

Forward Operating Base Inkerman or more simply FOB Inkerman is a former forward operating base in Afghanistan operated by the International Security Assistance Force (ISAF) under Operation Herrick (OP H), it was located 6 miles (9.7 km) north east of Sangin.

== Units ==
- OP H 6 (June – October 2007)
  - 1st Battalion, Grenadier Guards
  - D ( Cambridgeshire) Company Reconnaissance Platoon, C (Essex) Company, 1st Battalion, Royal Anglian Regiment
- OP H 7 (October 2007 – April 2008)
  - Alpha Company, 40 Commando Royal Marines
  - Hislop Troop, 97 Battery (Lawson's Company), 4th Regiment Royal Artillery
- OP H 8 (April 2008 – October 2008)
  - B Company, 2nd Battalion, Parachute Regiment
    - Temporarily supported by half of B Company, 3rd Battalion, Parachute Regiment during July 2008.
  - 8 Platoon (Fire Support Group), B Company, 2nd Battalion, The Rifles
  - 1st and 2nd Troop, A Squadron, Queens Royal Lancers who formed the Viking Armoured Support Group. (May 2008 - September 2008)
- OP H 9 (October 2008 – April 2009)
  - Yankee Company, 45 Commando, Royal Marines
- OP H 10 (April 2009 – October 2009)
  - 2nd Battalion, The Rifles
- OP H 11 (October 2009 - April 2010)
  - A Company, 4th Battalion, The Rifles
- OP H 12 (April 2010 - October 2010)
  - Bravo Company, 40 Commando, Royal Marines

== Bibliography ==
- Bishop, P (2009). Ground Truth. UK: HarperPress. ISBN 978-0-00-729665-1.
- Douglas, C (2013). Fire Mission. UK: Createspace. ISBN 978-1492880769.
- Lewis, R (2013). Company Commander. UK: Virgin Books. ISBN 978-0753540312.
- Streatfeild, R (2014). Honourable Warriors: Fighting the Taliban in Afghanistan. USA: Pen & Sword Military. ISBN 978-1783462278.
