= Musa Qala District =

Musa Qala موسی قلعه
- District
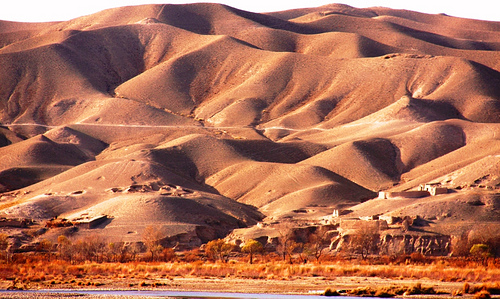
- Valley and mountains surrounding Musa Qaleh

- Location within Afghanistan
- Coordinates: 32°28′12″N 64°44′24″E
- Country: Afghanistan
- Province: Helmand Province

Population (2012)
  - Total: 57,500

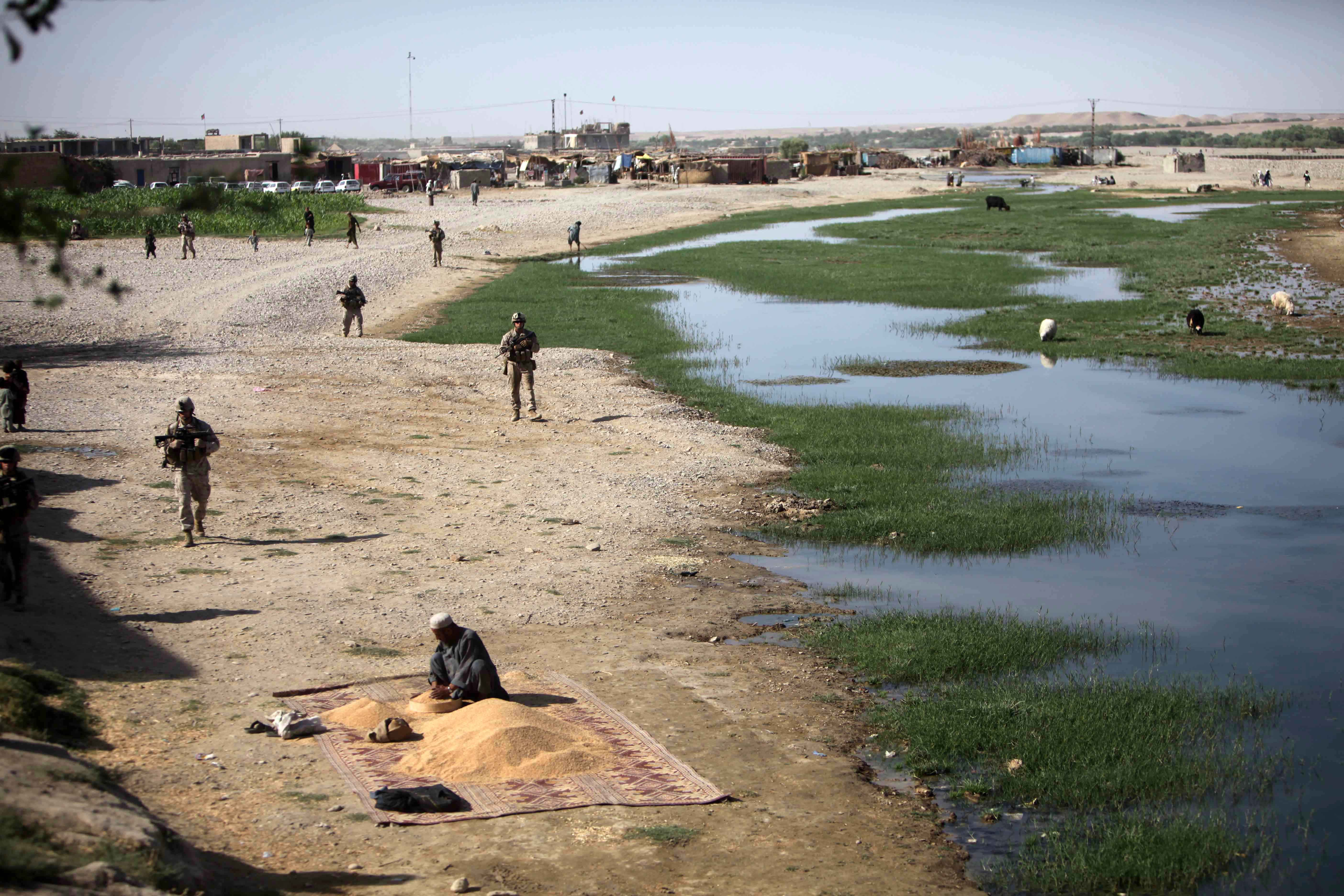
Marines with 1st Battalion, 2nd Marine Regiment, patrol the Musa Qala District Center in 2010.

Musa Qala (Pashto: موسی قلعه) is a district in the north of Helmand Province, Afghanistan. Its population was around 57,500 in 2012 and are 97% ethnic Pashtun. The district centre is the village of Musa Qala; there are 19 other large villages and 200 smaller settlements, mostly along the Musa Qala River. The area is irrigated by the Helmand and Arghandab Valley Authority.

NATO-led International Security Assistance Force extended its presence to this region in mid-2006. Musa Qala, along with the rest of Helmand, was to be under the responsibility of British forces.

The village of Musa Qala was the scene of fierce fighting between British Pathfinder Platoon troops and Taliban insurgents during the summer of 2006. The British had set up a stronghold in the local governor's office and faced daily waves of determined attacks. The British garrison was later relieved by a Danish infantry team who faced renewed insurgent attacks, culminating in better-trained militant fighters equipped with rockets and mortars. After a month of these attacks, the fighting died down, and the Danish forces handed control of the base back to British forces. On 17 October 2006, after a 35-day lull in violence, the British left the village, handing over control to the local elders' council.

== History ==
In January 1979, Musa Qala fell to Nasim Akhundzada after a battle against a pro-government militia led by Ghulam Dastgar Mahali, and the district governor, Zabit Aulleah, fled. Three days later, Afghan forces captured the district and installed the new district governor from Nangarhar, Sher Gul. In February 1979, the government withdrew its army, and Nasim Akhudzada recaptured Musa Qala and executed thirty elders who cooperated with the government.

On August 26, 2015, Taliban fighters seized control of district headquarters from Afghan forces.

== 2007 fighting between ISAF and Taliban insurgents ==
A unit of several hundred Taliban soldiers occupied Musa Qala on February 2, 2007. Eurasianet reported: "The attack laid waste to an agreement there, brokered last fall by Richards and local tribal elders, under which NATO troops agreed to withdraw from the town in return for a commitment by local Afghan leaders to oppose the Taliban."

British General David J. Richards, an expert at negotiation, was the outgoing NATO commander. Eurasianet reported that the new NATO commander, U.S. General Dan McNeill, opposes the kind of local agreements that Richards favored, and speculated that the aerial bombardment that was reported to have killed Mullah Abdul Ghafour in February 2007 was a sign of McNeill's more aggressive, less conciliatory approach.

== See also ==
- Districts of Afghanistan
