= Patrol Base Shamshad =

Patrol Base Shamshad
- Helmand Province in Afghanistan
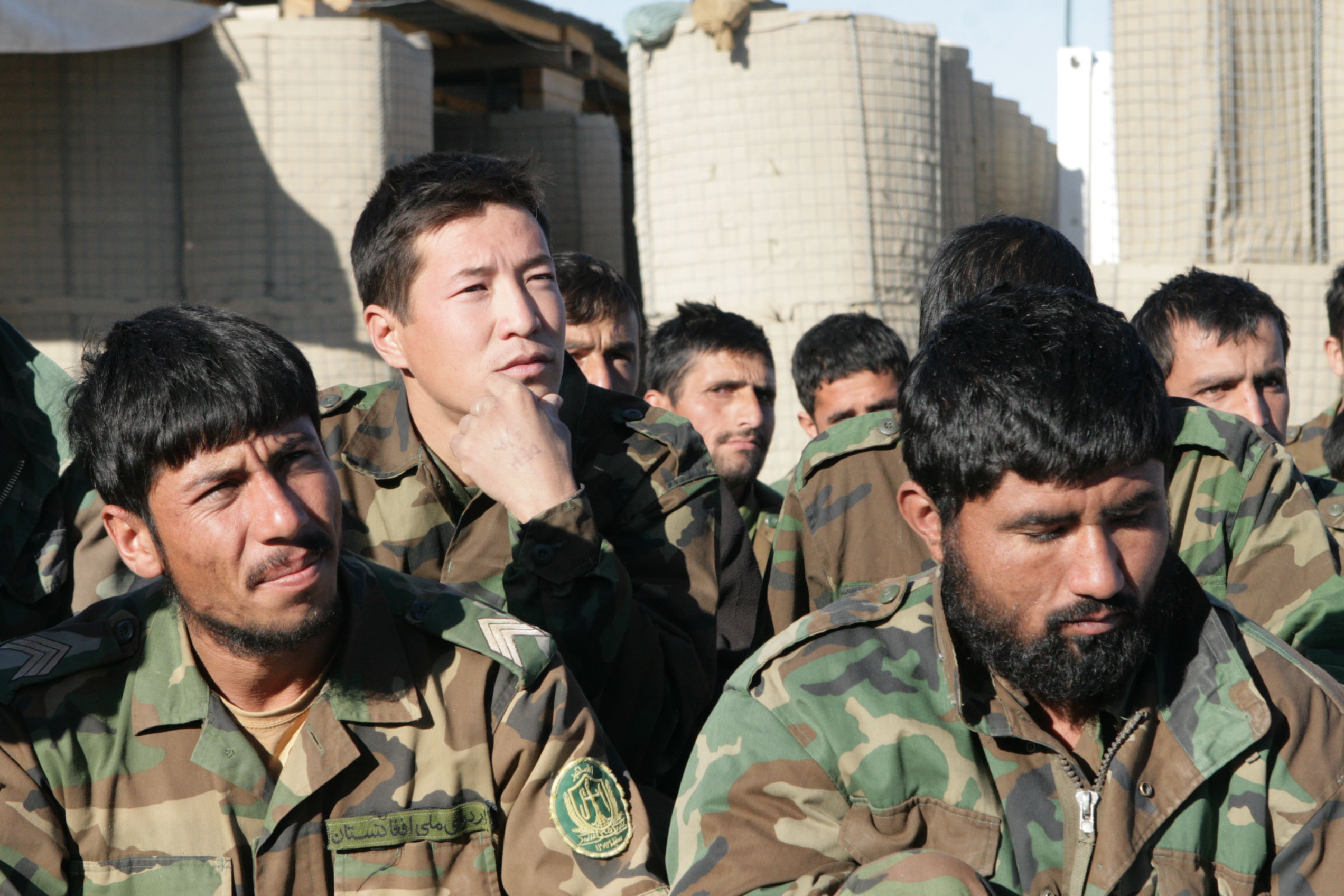
- Afghan soldiers at Patrol Base Shamshad

Site information
- Owner: International Security Assistance Force (ISAF)
- Operator: Afghan National Army (ANA); British Army; Maavägi; United States Army; United States Marine Corps (USMC)

Patrol Base Shamshad is a foreign military base in Helmand Province, Afghanistan. The camp is 15 kilometres (9.3 mi) south of Garmsir.

Both Estonian and British troops have occupied the base. The base has been used to train Afghan soldiers.

== Units ==
The following units have been posted here at some point:

- 'A' Squadron of the 1st The Queen's Dragoon Guards under Operation Herrick IX between October 2008 and April 2009.
- Company C, Expeditionary Estonian Task Force during November 2009.
- 2nd Brigade Platoon, 2nd Air Naval Gunfire Liaison Company, Marine Expeditionary Brigade-Afghanistan during November 2009.
