= Operation Herrick order of battle =

This is the Operation Herrick ground order of battle, which lists any British ground forces that have taken part in the duration of Operation Herrick between 2002 and 2014.

== Operation Herrick 0-10 ==
Operation Herrick began in 2002 on the end of Operation Fingal, which saw Britain hand command of the ISAF force to Turkey. At that point, the deployment was scaled back from 2,100 to approximately 300, primarily concerned with security in Kabul, and manning the UK Afghan National Army Training Team (UKANATT). In 2003, the deployment in Kabul was expanded to battalion size when two Provincial Reconstruction Teams were established, along with a rapid reaction force, based around a light role infantry battalion, the Afghanistan Roulement Infantry Battalion (ARIB). In January 2006, the Government announced that, due to the worsening situation in the south of Afghanistan, a brigade sized formation numbering approximately 3,300, Task Force Helmand, would be deployed to Helmand Province.

=== Operation Herrick ===
April 2004 - September 2004:

- Deputy Commander, Combined Force Command, Afghanistan: Major-General John Cooper (May 2004 to December 2004)
- 1st Battalion, The Green Howards (Alexandra, Princess of Wales's Own Yorkshire Regiment)

=== Operation Herrick I ===
October 2004 - March 2005:

- Deputy Commander, Combined Force Command, Afghanistan: Major-General John Cooper (October 2004 to December 2004)
- Deputy Commander, Combined Force Command, Afghanistan: Major-General Peter Gilchrist (December 2004 to March 2005)
- 1st Battalion, The Worcestershire and Sherwood Foresters Regiment (29th/45th Foot)

=== Operation Herrick II ===
April 2005 - September 2005:

- Deputy Commander, Combined Force Command, Afghanistan: Major-General Peter Gilchrist (April 2005 to September 2005)
- 2nd Battalion, Royal Gurkha Rifles

=== Operation Herrick III ===
October 2005 - March 2006:

- Deputy Commander, Combined Force Command, Afghanistan: Major-General Peter Gilchrist (October 2005 to December 2005)
- Deputy Commander, Combined Force Command, Afghanistan: Major-General Christopher Wilson (January 2006 to March 2006)
- 1st Battalion, Royal Gloucestershire, Berkshire and Wiltshire Regiment
  - Support Company
- Elements of 7th Signal Regiment

=== Operation Herrick IV ===
April 2006 – September 2006:

- Deputy Commander, Combined Force Command, Afghanistan: Major-General Christopher Wilson (April 2006 to September 2006)
- HQ, 16 Air Assault Brigade
- Headquarters Allied Rapid Reaction Corps Support Battalion
  - British Forces Transport Troop

Principal Manoeuvre Units

- 3rd Battalion, The Parachute Regiment
  - A Company
  - B Company & 6 (Guards) Platoon
  - C Company & Ranger Platoon
  - Support Company
- 1st Battalion, The Royal Irish Regiment (27th (Inniskilling), 83rd, 87th and Ulster Defence Regiment)
  - Somme Platoon
  - Barrosa Platoon
  - Patrols Platoon
  - Ranger Platoon
  - Reconnaissance Platoon

ANA & ANP Mentoring

- 7th Parachute Regiment Royal Horse Artillery

Logistics HQ

- Commando Logistic Regiment

Other units

- Easy Company
  - Somme Platoon from 1st Battalion, Royal Irish Regiment
  - Barrosa Platoon from 1st Battalion, Royal Irish Regiment
  - Ad hoc company headquarters from 3 PARA
- Pathfinder Platoon
- Household Cavalry Regiment
  - D Squadron (Formation Reconnaissance Squadron)
- Argyll and Sutherland Highlanders, 5th Battalion the Royal Regiment of Scotland
  - B Company

Royal Artillery

- 5th Regiment Royal Artillery
  - Unknown Battery (STA)
  - 4/73 (Sphinx) Special Observation Post Battery RA
- 32nd Regiment Royal Artillery
  - 18 (Quebec 1759) Battery

Royal Engineers

- 23 Engineer Regiment (Air Assault), Royal Engineers
  - 51 Parachute Squadron
    - 8 Troop (Made up of attached personnel from 9 Parachute Squadron RE)
- Elements of 33 Engineer Regiment RE
- 39 Engineer Regiment RE
  - 53 Field Squadron
  - 48 Field Squadron

Royal Logistic Corps

- Elements of 11 Explosive Ordnance Disposal Regiment RLC
- 13 Air Assault Support Regiment RLC
- 29 Regiment RLC

Royal Signals

- 216 Signal Squadron
- Elements of 14th Signal Regiment (Electronic Warfare)

Royal Electrical and Mechanical Engineers

- 7 Air Assault Battalion REME
  - 8 Close Support Squadron

Royal Army Medical Corps

- 16 Close Support Medical Regiment, Royal Army Medical Corps

Royal Military Police

- 1st Regiment, Royal Military Police
  - 114 Provost Company
- 4 Regiment Royal Military Police
  - 156 Provost Company (Air Assault)

Theatre Reserve Battalion

- 2nd Battalion, Royal Regiment of Fusiliers

=== Operation Herrick V ===
October 2006 - April 2007:

- Deputy Commander, Combined Force Command, Afghanistan: Major-General Christopher Wilson (October 2006 to December 2006)
- Commander, International Security Assistance Force: General Sir David Richards (December 2006 to April 2007)
- HQ, 3 Commando Brigade

ANA & ANP Mentoring

- 45 Commando, Royal Marines
  - Whiskey Company
  - Zulu Company

Logistics HQ

- Commando Logistic Regiment

Other units

- The Light Dragoons
  - C Squadron
- 42 Commando, Royal Marines
  - Juliet Company
  - Kilo Company
  - Mike Company
    - 10 Troop
    - 11 Troop
  - Reconnaissance Troop
- 32nd Regiment Royal Artillery
  - 42 (Alem Hamza) Battery UAVs
- 29th Commando Regiment Royal Artillery
  - 7 (Sphinx) Battery Royal Artillery
  - 148 Commando Forward Observation Battery Royal Artillery
- 28 Engineer Regiment RE
- 59 Independent Commando Squadron, Royal Engineers
- Elements of 33 Engineer Regiment RE
- Elements of 11 Explosive Ordnance Disposal Regiment RLC
- 27 Transport Regiment RLC
- 29 Regiment RLC
- 2nd Medical Brigade, Royal Army Medical Corps
  - 22 Field Hospital
- 3 Regiment RMP
  - 174 Provost Company
- Elements of The 2nd Battalion Royal Regiment of Fusiliers (Theatre Reserve Battalion)
- The Rifle Volunteers/6 Rifles (TA)
  - Peninsula Company

=== Operation Herrick VI ===
April 2007 – October 2007:

- Commander, International Security Assistance Force: General Sir David Richards (April 2007 to October 2007)
- HQ, 12 Mechanised Brigade

Principal Manoeuvre Unit

- 1st Battalion, The Worcestershire and Sherwood Foresters Regiment (29th/45th Foot)
  - B Company
  - C Company
  - D (Fire Support) Company

ANA & ANP Mentoring

- 1st Battalion, Grenadier Guards
  - Inkerman Company
  - The Queen's Company
  - No 2 company

Other units

- 12 Mechanized Brigade Reconnaissance Force (12 BRF)
  - 1 Platoon
  - 2 Platoon
  - B Troop 4/73 (Sphinx) Special Observation Post Battery RA (Detached)
- The Light Dragoons
  - B Squadron
- 2nd Royal Tank Regiment
  - Falcon Squadron
- 1st Battalion, The Royal Anglian Regiment - first unit in Afghanistan to the use the new "Vector" protected patrol vehicle
  - A (Norfolk) Company
  - B (Suffolk) Company
  - No 3 (Fighting) Company 1st Battalion The Grenadier Guards. Company was raised specifically for Herrick 6 and came under command of 1st Battalion The Royal Anglian Regiment. Company was disbanded once more on return to UK.
    - 7 Platoon
- Elements of 16th Regiment Royal Artillery
- 19th Regiment Royal Artillery
  - 5 (Gibraltar 1779–1783) Battery
  - 28/143 Battery (Tomb's Troop)
  - 127 Dragon Battery
  - 13 (Martinique 1809) Battery
  - 52 (Niagara) Battery
- 32nd Regiment Royal Artillery
  - 57 (Bhurtpore) Battery Royal Artillery UAVs
- 39th Regiment Royal Artillery
  - Unknown Troop of MLRS
- 26 Engineer Regiment RE
- Elements of 33 Engineer Regiment RE
- Elements of 11 Explosive Ordnance Disposal Regiment RLC
- 4 Logistic Support Regiment RLC
  - 871 Postal & Courier Squadron RLC
  - Elements of 152 (Ulster) Transport Regt RLC
- 4 General Support Medical Regiment
- 2nd Medical Brigade, Royal Army Medical Corps
  - 212 Field Hospital
- Somme Company, composed mainly of elements of The London Regiment, also a platoon of Grenadier Guards and individual members of the Reserve Forces.
- 23 Pioneer Regiment RLC (187 Squadron, 519 Squadron and 206 Squadron)

In February 2007, it was announced that an additional 1,400 troops would be deployed to Afghanistan, primarily formed as a battlegroup around a light infantry battalion, the 1st Battalion The Royal Welsh (Royal Welch Fusiliers).
*Renamed as 2nd Battalion, The Mercian Regiment (Worcesters and Foresters) 01/09/07

=== Operation Herrick VII ===
November 2007 - April 2008:

- Commander, International Security Assistance Force: General Sir David Richards (November 2007 to November 2007)
- Deputy Commander, International Security Assistance Force: Major-General Jonathon Riley (December 2007 to April 2008)
- HQ 52 Infantry Brigade - deployment first reported November 2006.
  - 258 Signal Squadron Royal Corps of Signals - Bde HQ

ANA & ANP Mentoring

- 2nd Battalion, The Yorkshire Regiment (14th/15th, 19th and 33rd/76th Foot) (Green Howards)
  - OMLT 2 - B (KH) Company

Other units

- Household Cavalry Regiment
  - C Squadron
  - D Squadron
- A Squadron, Queens Royal Lancers, Viking Armoured Support Group
- 40 Commando, Royal Marines - Camp Bastion (Battle Group North)
  - Alpha Company - FOB Inkerman
  - Bravo Company - Sangin
  - Charlie Company - COB Zeebrugge/Kajaki Dam
  - Delta Company - Now Zad
  - Echo Company - FOB Robinson
- 1st Battalion, Coldstream Guards
  - Unknown Platoon, No. 2 Company
  - No. 10 Platoon, No. 3 Company
  - Sniper Section
  - Support Company
- 1st Battalion, Scots Guards
  - Right Flank FV510 warrior tracked armoured vehicle
  - Elements of Number 2 Company Coldstream Guards

Attached to Right flank as dismounted infantry

- 1st Battalion, The Royal Gurkha Rifles
- Salonika Company, The Rifles
- 4th Regiment Royal Artillery
- 32nd Regiment Royal Artillery
  - 18 (Quebec 1759) Battery RA UAVs
- 39th Regiment Royal Artillery
  - Unknown Troop of M270 Multiple Launch Rocket System
- 36 Engineer Regiment RE
  - 20 Field Squadron
- Elements of 33 Engineer Regiment RE
  - 21 Field Squadron (EOD)
- Elements of 170 (Infrastructure Support) Engineer Group RE
- Kings Royal Hussars
  - B Squadron using Mastiff's
- Elements of 11 Explosive Ordnance Disposal Regiment RLC
- Elements of 14 Signal Regiment (Electronic Warfare)
- 27 Transport Regiment RLC
- 5 General Support Medical Regiment
- 1st Battalion, Royal Electrical and Mechanical Engineers
- 101 Provost Company, Royal Military Police

=== Operation Herrick VIII ===
May 2008 – October 2008:

- Deputy Commander, International Security Assistance Force: Major-General Jonathon Riley (May 2008 to October 2008)
- HQ 16 Air Assault Brigade

ANA Mentoring

- 1st Battalion, The Royal Irish Regiment (27th (Inniskilling), 83rd, 87th and Ulster Defence Regiment)
  - Imjin Company
  - Elements of C troop from C Battery 3rd Royal Horse Artillery

ANP Mentoring

- Police Reform Cell
- Royal Military Police - Police Mentoring Team (PMT)

Other units

- Household Cavalry Regiment
  - D Squadron
- Royal Scots Dragoon Guards
  - B Squadron
- Queen's Royal Lancers
  - A Squadron
  - Viking Squadron
- The Royal Highland Fusiliers, 2nd Battalion The Royal Regiment of Scotland
- The Highlanders, 4th Battalion The Royal Regiment of Scotland
  - Bravo Company
- The Argyll and Sutherland Highlanders, 5th Battalion The Royal Regiment of Scotland
- 2nd Battalion, The Parachute Regiment
  - B Company
  - C (Bruneval) Company
  - D Company - Strike operations roll
- 3rd Battalion, The Parachute Regiment
  - A Company
  - B Company
  - Guards' Parachute Platoon
- 7th (Parachute) Regiment Royal Horse Artillery
- 32nd Regiment Royal Artillery 42(Alem Hamza) Battery
- 39th Regiment Royal Artillery
  - Unknown Troop of MLRS
- 23 (Air Assault) Regiment RE
- Elements of 33 Engineer Regiment RE
- Elements of 170 (Infrastructure Support) Engineer Group, Royal Engineers
- Elements of 11 Explosive Ordnance Disposal Regiment RLC
- 13 Air Assault Support Regiment RLC
- 6 Supply Regiment RLC
- 16 Close Support Medical Regiment
- 7th Battalion, Royal Electrical and Mechanical Engineers
- Elements of 156 Provost Company, Royal Military Police

*Elements of the Theatre Reserve Battalion, B Company, 1st Battalion The Royal Welsh (Royal Welch Fusiliers), then 2nd Battalion The Princess of Wales's Royal Regiment (Queen's and Royal Hampshires) were deployed in support of both 16 Air Assault Brigade and 3 Commando Brigade

=== Operation Herrick IX ===
November 2008 - April 2009:

- Deputy Commander, International Security Assistance Force: Major-General James Dutton (November 2008 to April 2009)
- HQ 3 Commando Brigade

Principal Manoeuvre Units

- 42 Commando, Royal Marines - Kandahar Air Field
  - Juliet Company - FOB Argyll (Force protection in Kabul and Lashkar Gah)
- 45 Commando, Royal Marines (Battle Group North in the Upper Sangin Valley)
  - Victor Company - Kajaki Dam
  - Whiskey Company - FOB Jackson
  - X-Ray Company - FOB Nolay
  - Yankee Company - FOB Inkerman
  - Zulu Company - FOB Gibraltar
- 1st The Queen's Dragoon Guards (Battle Group South at Garmsir)
- 2nd Battalion, Royal Gurkha Rifles (Battle Group North West at Musa Qal'eh and Now Zad)

ANA Mentoring

- 1st Battalion, The Rifles with additional members from 6 RIFLES
  - C Company (Mentored 4th Kandak, 3rd Brigade, 205th Corps)

ANP Mentoring

- Royal Military Police
- 2nd Battalion, Royal Gurkha Rifles PMT

Other units

- Information Exploration Group (IX Group)
  - Brigade Reconnaissance Force (BRF)
  - 57 (Bhurtpore) Battery, Royal Artillery UAV Battery from 32nd Regiment Royal Artillery
- 2nd Battalion, The Royal Welsh (Royal Regiment of Wales)
- Household Cavalry Regiment
- 1st Battalion, The Princess of Wales's Royal Regiment
  - 1 Armoured Infantry company group
- 2nd Battalion, The Princess of Wales's Royal Regiment (Theatre Reserve Battalion deployment)
- 29th Commando Regiment Royal Artillery
- 39th Regiment Royal Artillery
  - 74 Battery (The Battle Axe Company) Royal Artillery using MLRS
- 24 (Commando) Regiment RE
- 35 Engineer Regiment RE
  - 77 Armoured Engineer Squadron
- Elements of 33 Engineer Regiment RE
- Elements of 170 (Infrastructure Support) Engineer Group, Royal Engineers
- Elements of 11 Explosive Ordnance Disposal Regiment RLC
- Commando Logistic Regiment, Royal Marines
- Elements of 17 Port And Maritime Regiment RLC
- United Kingdom Landing Force Command Support Group, Royal Marines
- 539 Assault Squadron RM
  - Armoured Support Group
- Royal Marines Band Service
- 3rd Battalion, Royal Electrical and Mechanical Engineers

== Operation Herrick 10-20 ==
=== Operation Herrick X ===
May 2009 – October 2009:

- Deputy Commander, International Security Assistance Force: Major-General James Dutton (May 2009 to October 2009)
- HQ 19 Light Brigade

Principal Manoeuvre Units

- 2nd Royal Tank Regiment
  - Egypt Squadron
- The Light Dragoons
- 1st Battalion, Welsh Guards
  - The Prince of Wales's Company
  - No. 2 Company
- 2nd Battalion, The Royal Welsh (Royal Regiment of Wales)
  - C Company
- The Black Watch, 3rd Battalion The Royal Regiment of Scotland - Brigade Reconnaissance Force
- 2nd Battalion, The Rifles
- 4th Battalion, The Rifles
  - B Company
  - R Company
- 2nd Battalion, The Royal Regiment of Fusiliers

ANA Mentoring

- 2nd Battalion, Mercian Regiment (Worcesters and Foresters)
  - B Company

ANP Mentoring

- Police Operational Mentoring and Liaison Team (POMLT)
- 2nd Battalion, Royal Gurkha Rifles
  - F Company

Other units

- 5th Regiment Royal Artillery
  - Unknown Battery (STA)
- 40th Regiment Royal Artillery
- 32nd Regiment Royal Artillery
- Large Elements of 9 (Plassey Battery) 12th Regiment Royal Artillery under the command of 32nd Regiment Royal Artillery (MUAS detachments x 16 which formed part of the TUAS Battery)
- 39th Regiment Royal Artillery
  - Unknown Troop of M270 Multiple Launch Rocket System
- Elements of 33 Engineer Regiment RE
- 38 Engineer Regiment RE
- Elements of 170 (Infrastructure Support) Engineer Group, Royal Engineers
- Theatre Logistics Group - 4 Logistic Support Regiment
- Elements of 11 Explosive Ordnance Disposal Regiment RLC
- 17 Port and Maritime Regiment RLC, Royal Logistic Corps (Kabul)
- 27 Regiment RLC
  - 91 Supply Squadron
- 19 Combat Service Support Battalion, Royal Electrical and Mechanical Engineers (REME)
- 4th Battalion REME,
- 2nd Medical Regiment
- 4th Battalion, The Mercian Regiment
  - Normandy Company
- Elements of 5th Battalion Royal Regiment of Fusiliers (Kabul)
- 173rd Provost Company Royal Military Police

=== Operation Herrick XI ===
November 2009 - April 2010:

- Deputy Commander, International Security Assistance Force: Major-General Nicholas Parker (November 2009 to April 2010)
- HQ 11 Light Brigade

Principal Manoeuvre Units

- The Household Cavalry Regiment
  - A and C Squadrons in their role of Formation Reconnaissance
  - B Squadron in the Brigade level role of Brigade Reconnaissance Force
- 1st Battalion, Grenadier Guards
  - Queen's Company
  - No. 2 Company
  - The Inkerman Company
    - 5 Platoon
- 1st Battalion, Coldstream Guards
- 3rd Battalion, The Rifles
- 1st Battalion, The Royal Welsh (Royal Welch Fusiliers)
- 2nd Battalion, The Royal Welsh (Royal Regiment of Wales)
  - A Company

ANA Mentoring

- 2nd Battalion, The Yorkshire Regiment (14th/15th, 19th & 33rd/76th Foot) (Green Howards)

ANP Mentoring

- 1st Battalion, The Royal Anglian Regiment
  - No. 3 Company
- 4th Regiment Royal Military Police
  - 160 Provost Company

Other units

- 1st Royal Tank Regiment
  - D Squadron
- Elements of 2nd Royal Tank Regiment
- 4th Battalion The Rifles
  - A Company
- 1st Battalion The Royal Regiment of Scotland
  - B Company
- 1st Regiment Royal Horse Artillery
- 28 Engineer Regiment RE
- Elements of 33 Engineer Regiment RE
- Elements of 101 (City of London) Engineer Regiment RE
- Elements of 170 (Infra Sp) Engineer Group, Royal Engineers
- Elements of 11 Explosive Ordnance Disposal Regiment RLC
- 104 Battalion Royal Electrical and Mechanical Engineers
- 10 Queen's Own Gurkha Logistic Regiment RLC
- 261 Signals Squadron, Royal Corps of Signals
- 5th Regiment Royal Artillery
  - K 'Hondeghem' Bty (STA)
- Elements of 256 (City of London) Field Hospital
- Theatre Logistics Group - 9 Regiment RLC

In October 2009, the total force was increased to 9,000 personnel with the addition of several other units:

- 1st Battalion, Coldstream Guards
- 1st Battalion, The Royal Anglian Regiment
  - No. 3 Company
- 3rd Battalion, The Royal Anglian Regiment
  - 12 Platoon
- 2nd Battalion, The Duke of Lancaster's Regiment (King's, Lancashire & Border)
  - No. 1 Company
- 1st Battalion, The Royal Regiment of Scotland
  - BRAVO Company

=== Operation Herrick XII ===
May 2010 - October 2010:

- Deputy Commander, International Security Assistance Force: Major-General Nicholas Parker (May 2010 to September 2010)
- Deputy Commander, International Security Assistance Force: Major-General James Bucknall (September 2010 to October 2010)
- HQ 4 Mechanized Brigade
  - 204 Signal Squadron Royal Signals

Principal Manoeuvre Units

- Queen's Royal Lancers
- 40 Commando, Royal Marines
  - Bravo Company
    - 4 Troop
  - Charlie Company
    - 7 Troop
  - Delta Company
- 1st Battalion, The Royal Gurkha Rifles
- 1st Battalion, The Duke of Lancaster's Regiment (King's, Lancashire and Border)
- 1st Battalion, Scots Guards

ANA Mentoring

- Brigade Advisory Group (BAG)
- The Royal Scots Borderers, 1st Battalion The Royal Regiment of Scotland

ANP Mentoring

- Police Mentoring and Advisory Group (PMAG)
- 1st Battalion, The Mercian Regiment (Cheshire)

Other units

- Royal Dragoon Guards
  - A SQN
  - C SQN
  - D SQN The Green Horse
- 4th Regiment Royal Artillery
- Theatre UAV Battery
- 21 Engineer Regiment RE
- Elements of 33 Engineer Regiment RE
- Elements of 11 Explosive Ordnance Disposal Regiment RLC
- 3 Medical Regiment
- 34 Field Hospital
- 1st Battalion, Royal Electrical and Mechanical Engineers
- 101st Battalion, Royal Electrical and Mechanical Engineers
- 12 Close Support Logistic Regiment (CSLR) - based on 12 Logistic Support Regiment, Royal Logistic Corps (since disbanded)
- Elements of 23 Pioneer Regiment (Force Protection Platoon, 12 CSLR) (since disbanded)
- Elements of 150 Regiment, Royal Logistic Corps (integrated within 12 CSLR)
- Theatre Logistics Group - 8 Regiment RLC
- Weapon Intelligence Specialist Company
- 2nd Battalion, Arnhem Coy The Duke of Lancaster's Regiment (King's, Lancashire & Border)
- Theatre Provost Group: 150 Provost Company, 1st Regiment Royal Military Police, supported by 101 and 243 Provost Companys, 5th Regiment Royal Military Police and the Tactical Provost Wing, Royal Air Force Police.

=== Operation Herrick XIII ===
November 2010 - April 2011:

- Deputy Commander, International Security Assistance Force: Major-General James Bucknall (November 2010 to April 2011)
- HQ, 16 Air Assault Brigade
  - 216 Parachute Signal Squadron

Principal Manoeuvre Units

- 2nd Royal Tank Regiment
  - Badger Squadron
  - Cyclops Squadron
  - Falcon Squadron
- 2nd Battalion, The Parachute Regiment
- 3rd Battalion, The Parachute Regiment
- 1st Battalion, The Royal Irish Regiment (27th (Inniskilling), 83rd, 87th and Ulster Defence Regiment)
- The Royal Highland Fusiliers, 2nd Battalion The Royal Regiment of Scotland
  - B Company

ANA Mentoring

- BAG
- 1st Battalion, Irish Guards

ANP Mentoring

- PMAG
- The Argyll and Sutherland Highlanders, 5th Battalion The Royal Regiment of Scotland

Other units

- Household Cavalry Regiment
  - D Squadron
- Elements of 4th Battalion, The Parachute Regiment Arnhem Company
- Elements of 2nd Battalion, The Royal Irish Regiment Barrossa Company
- Elements of 4th Battalion, Duke of Lancaster's Regiment
- 5th Regiment Royal Artillery
  - Z Battery (STA)
- 7th (Parachute) Regiment Royal Horse Artillery
- 32nd Regiment Royal Artillery
  - Unknown battery of UAVs
- 39th Regiment Royal Artillery
  - Unknown Troop of MLRS
- 23 (Air Assault) Regiment RE
  - 9 Parachute Squadron RE
  - 51 Parachute Squadron RE
  - 5 Armoured Squadron RE attached
- Elements of 33 Engineer Regiment RE
- Elements of 101 (City of London) Engineer Regiment RE
- Elements of 170 (Infra Sp) Engineer Group, Royal Engineers
- Elements of 11 Explosive Ordnance Disposal Regiment RLC
- 626 and 601 Tactical Air Control Party
- Theatre Logistics Group - 17 Port and Maritime Regiment RLC
- 13 Air Assault Support Regiment RLC
- 9 Regiment RLC
  - 95 Squadron RLC
- 6 Supply Regiment RLC
- 16 Medical Regiment
- 207 (Manchester) Field Hospital
- 212 (Sheffield) Field Hospital
- 7th Battalion, Royal Electrical and Mechanical Engineers

=== Operation Herrick XIV ===
May – October 2011:

- Deputy Commander, International Security Assistance Force: Major-General James Bucknall (May 2011 to October 2011)
- HQ 3 Commando Brigade

Principal Manoeuvre Units

- Brigade Reconnaissance Force
- 1st Battalion, The Rifles
  - A Company.
  - B Company
  - C Company.
  - S Company.
- 42 Commando, Royal Marines
  - Juliet Company
  - Lima Company
  - Mike Company
- 45 Commando, Royal Marines
- The Highlanders, 4th Battalion The Royal Regiment of Scotland
  - B Company.

ANA Mentoring

- BAG
- 3rd Battalion, The Mercian Regiment (Staffords)

ANP Mentoring

- PMAG
- 2nd Battalion, The Royal Gurkha Rifles
  - A Company.

Other units

- The Royal Scots Dragoon Guards (Carabiniers and Greys)
- The 9th/12th Royal Lancers (Prince of Wales')
- 30 Commando (IX), Royal Marines
- 29 (Commando) Regiment, Royal Artillery
  - 53 (Louisburg) Battery RA
- 24 Commando Engineer Regiment RE
- 32 Engineer Regiment RE
- Elements of 28 Engineer Regiment
  - 39 Armoured Engineer Squadron
- 32 Regiment, Royal Artillery
- Elements of 33 Engineer Regiment RE
- Elements of 11 Explosive Ordnance Disposal Regiment RLC
- Commando Logistic Regiment, Royal Marines
- 2 Close Support Battalion, Royal Electrical and Mechanical Engineers

=== Operation Herrick XV ===
November 2011 - April 2012:

- Deputy Commander, International Security Assistance Force: Major-General Adrian Bradshaw (November 2011 to April 2012)
- HQ 20th Armoured Brigade
- Brigade Reconnaissance Force
  - Elements of 1st Battalion, The Yorkshire Regiment
  - Elements of 1st The Queen's Dragoon Guards

Principal Manoeuvre Units

- The Queen's Royal Hussars (Queen's Own and Royal Irish)
- 5th Battalion, The Rifles
- The Black Watch, 3rd Battalion The Royal Regiment of Scotland
- 1st Battalion, Grenadier Guards
- 2nd Battalion, The Mercian Regiment (Worcesters & Foresters)

ANA Mentoring

- BAG
- 2nd Battalion, The Rifles

ANP Mentoring

- PMAG
- 1st Battalion, The Princess of Wales's Royal Regiment

Other units

- 1st The Queen's Dragoon Guards
- 1st Battalion, The Yorkshire Regiment (Prince of Wales's Own)
  - A Company attached to 3 SCOTS
  - B Company attached to the Danish Army
  - C Company attached to the Danish Army
  - Support Company attached to the Queen's Royal Hussars
  - Headquarters staff attached to Task Force Helmand Headquarters.
- 35 Engineer Regiment RE
- 38 Engineer Regiment RE
  - 11 Field Squadron
- Elements of 39 Engineer Regiment Royal Engineers
- 1 Logistic Support Regiment RLC
- 1 Medical Regiment
- 3 Close Support Battalion, Royal Electrical & Mechanical Engineers
- 110 Provost Company
- Elements of 33 Engineer Regiment RE
- Elements 170 Infra Sp Engr Gp Royal Engineers
- 5th Regiment Royal Artillery
  - K 'Hondeghem' Bty (STA)
- 10 (Assaye Battery) 47th Regiment Royal Artillery
- 26 Regiment Royal Artillery (16 Battery Sandhams Company)

=== Operation Herrick XVI ===
May 2012 - October 2012:

- Deputy Commander, International Security Assistance Force: Major-General Adrian Bradshaw (May 2012 to September 2012)
- Deputy Commander, International Security Assistance Force: Major-General Nick Carter (September 2012 to October 2012)
- HQ 12 Mechanised Brigade

Principal Manoeuvre Units

- The King's Royal Hussars - HQ at MOB Lashkar Gah
  - B Squadron
  - D Squadron (Warthog Squadron) MOB Price
- 1st Battalion, Grenadier Guards
- 3rd Battalion, The Yorkshire Regiment (14th/15th, 19th and 33rd/76th Foot) (Duke of Wellington's)

1st Battalion The Royal Welsh

  - Prince Wales’s Company of 1st Battalion, Welsh Guards (Working as the operations company attached to the 3rd Battalion The Yorkshire Regiment)
- 1st Battalion, The Royal Anglian Regiment
  - A (Norfolk) Company
  - B (Suffolk) Company
  - C (Essex) Company
- Brigade Operations Company (BOC)
  - No. 3 Company, 1st Battalion Welsh Guards

ANA Mentoring

- BAG
  - 3rd Battalion, The Rifles Locations at:
    - Camp Tombstone, Camp Bastion
    - Camp Shorabak, Camp Bastion

ANP Mentoring

- PMAG
  - 1st Battalion, Welsh Guards at MOB Lashkar Gah
    - No. 2 Company
    - Support Company
    - LD Sqn
    - QOGLR Sqn
  - 174 Provost Company, Royal Military Police.
  - 7 (Royal Air Force Police) Squadron

BRF

- B Squadron The Light Dragoons and Soldiers from Welsh Guards, RLC and American EOD

Other units

- The Light Dragoons
  - A Squadron
- 4 Close Support Battalion, Royal Electrical and Mechanical Engineers
- 1st Royal Tank Regiment
- 19th Regiment Royal Artillery
- Elements of 5th Regiment Royal Artillery
  - P Battery (The Dragon Troop) Royal Artillery (STA)
- 32nd Regiment Royal Artillery – 22 (Gibraltar 1779–83) Battery
  - Desert Hawk III UAV
  - Honeywell T-Hawk MAV
  - Watchkeeper UAV
- 176 Abu Klea Battery 39 Regiment Royal Artillery
- 26 Engineer Regiment RE at Camp Bastion
- 33 Engineer Regiment (EOD) RE
- 4 Logistic Support Regiment RLC
- 24 Postal, Courier & Movements Regiment RLC
- 4 Medical Regiment, Royal Army Medical Corps
- 228 Signals Squadron

=== Operation Herrick XVII ===
November 2012 - April 2013:

- Deputy Commander, International Security Assistance Force: Major-General Nick Carter (November 2012 to April 2013)
- HQ 4th Mechanized Brigade Headquarters and Signal Squadron (204)
- HQ 104 Logistic Support Brigade

Principal Manoeuvre Units

- The Queen's Royal Lancers
- 1st Battalion, Scots Guards
- 40 Commando, Royal Marines - HQ at MOB Price
- 1st Battalion, The Mercian Regiment (Cheshire)
- 1st Battalion, The Duke of Lancaster's Regiment

ANA Mentoring

- BAG
- The Royal Scots Borderers, 1st Battalion The Royal Regiment of Scotland
  - Delta Company

ANP Mentoring

- PMAG
- The Royal Dragoon Guards

Other units

- 1st Battalion, The Royal Gurkha Rifles
- Elements of The Honourable Artillery Company
- Elements of The Royal Mercian and Lancastrian Yeomanry
- Elements of 6th Battalion The Royal Regiment of Scotland
- Elements of 3rd Battalion The Princess of Wales's Royal Regiment
- Elements of 4th Battalion The Duke of Lancaster's Regiment
- Elements of 4th Battalion The Mercian Regiment
- Elements of The London Regiment

Royal Artillery

- 4th Regiment Royal Artillery
- Elements of 5th Regiment Royal Artillery
  - 93 (Le Cateau) Battery
- Elements of 16 Regiment Royal Artillery
- Elements of 32 Regiment Royal Artillery
- Elements of 39 Regiment Royal Artillery
- Elements of 101 Regiment Royal Artillery

Royal Engineers

- 21 Engineer Regiment RE
- Elements of 28 Engineer Regiment
- Elements of 36 Engineer Regiment (Search)
- Elements of 42 Engineer Regiment (Geographic)
- Elements of 75 Engineer Regiment
- Elements of 101 (City of London) Engineer Regiment (Explosive Ordnance Disposal)
- Elements of 170 (Infrastructure Support) Engineer Group

Royal Logistic Corps

- Elements of 6 Regiment RLC
- 7 Regiment RLC
- Elements of 9 Regiment RLC
- Elements of 11 Explosive Ordnance Disposal Regiment RLC
- 12 Logistic Support Regiment RLC
- Elements of 17 Port and Maritime Regiment RLC
- Elements of 23 Pioneer Regiment RLC
- Elements of 29 Regiment RLC
- Elements of 148 Expeditionary Force Institute Squadron RLC
- Elements of 150 (Yorkshire) Transport Regiment RLC
- Elements of 159 Supply Regiment RLC

Royal Signals

- 2 Signal Regiment
- Elements of 10 Signal Regiment
- Elements of 14 Signal Regiment (Electronic Warfare)
- Elements of 15 Signal Regiment (Information Support)
- Elements of 21 Signal Regiment (Air Support)
- Elements of 32 Signal Regiment

Royal Electrical and Mechanical Engineers

- 1 Close Support Battalion REME
- Elements of 7 Air Assault Battalion REME
- Elements of 101 Force Support Battalion REME
- Elements of 102 Battalion REME
- Elements of 103 Battalion REME

Medical

- 3 Medical Regiment
- Elements of 204 (Northern Irish) Field Hospital
- Elements of 243 (Wessex) Field Hospital
- Elements of Tactical Medical Wing, RAF

Law enforcement

- 150 Provost Company, Royal Military Police
- Elements of 101 Provost Company Royal Military Police
- Elements of 5th Regiment Royal Military Police
- Elements of Special Investigations Branch (United Kingdom)
- Elements of The Military Provost Staff

Other units

- Elements of 1st Military Working Dog Regiment
- Elements of 1 Military Intelligence Battalion
- Elements of 2 Military Intelligence (Exploitation) Battalion
- Elements of 4 Military Intelligence Battalion
- Elements of The Military Stabilisation and Support Group
- Elements of 15 Psychological Operations Group
- Elements of The Defence Cultural Specialist Unit
- Elements of 90 Signals Unit, Royal Air Force
- Elements of 1 Air Control Centre, Royal Air Force
- Elements of 33 (Engineering) Squadron, Royal Air Force
- Elements of Tactical Supply Wing, Royal Air Force
- Elements of 1 Air Mobility Wing, Royal Air Force
- Elements of 2 (Mechanical Transport) Squadron, Royal Air Force
- Elements of 93 (Expeditionary Armaments) Squadron, Royal Air Force
- Elements of Engineering and Logistics Wing, Royal Air Force Odiham

=== Operation Herrick XVIII ===
May 2013 – October 2013:

- Deputy Commander, International Security Assistance Force: Major-General Nick Carter (May 2013 to July 2013)
- Deputy Commander, International Security Assistance Force: Major-General John Lorimer (July 2013 to October 2013)
- HQ 1 Mechanized Brigade
  - 215 Signal Squadron (Brigade Headquarters)
  - Campaign Signal Regiment: 3rd (United Kingdom) Division Headquarters and Signal Regiment (3DSR)
  - British Forces Combat Camera Team
  - EOD and Search Task Force
  - Joint Fires and Targeting Group
  - Operational Intelligence Support Group
  - Rear Operations Group
  - Transition Support Unit
    - Transition Support Unit Lashkar Gah
    - Transition Support Unit Nad-e Ali
    - Transition Support Unit Nahr-e-Saraj

Principal Manoeuvre Units

- 2nd Royal Tank Regiment (Armoured)
- 2nd Battalion, The Duke of Lancaster's Regiment (King's, Lancashire and Border) (Light Role Infantry)
- 1st Battalion, Royal Regiment of Fusiliers (Armoured Infantry)
  - Y Company

ANA Mentoring

- BAG
- 4th Battalion, The Rifles (Mechanized Infantry)

ANP Mentoring

- PMAG
- The Royal Highland Fusiliers 2nd Battalion, Royal Regiment of Scotland (Light Role Infantry)

Other units

- 1st Battalion, Irish Guards
  - No. 2 Company (Brigade Operations Company)
- Brigade Reconnaissance Force
  - Household Cavalry Regiment (Formation Reconnaissance)
  - 4 RIFLES Recce platoon
    - Intelligence Surveillance Target Acquisition and Reconnaissance Group
    - Unknown Squadron
- Royal Artillery
  - 1st Regiment Royal Horse Artillery (Light Role Artillery)
  - Z Battery (Surveillance & Target Acquisition)
  - 47 Regiment - 21 Air Assault Battery (UAS)
- Royal Engineers
  - 22 Engineer Regiment
- Royal Electrical and Mechanical Engineers
  - 6 (Close Support) Battalion REME
- Royal Signals
  - 258 Signal Squadron
  - 202 Signal Squadron
- Royal Logistic Corps
  - 3 Logistic Support Regiment RLC
- Army Medical Services
  - 5 Medical Regiment, Royal Army Medical Corps

=== Operation Herrick XIX ===
November 2013 - June 2014:

- Deputy Commander, International Security Assistance Force: Major-General John Lorimer (November 2013 to June 2014)
- HQ 7 Armoured Brigade
- 207 Signal Squadron (Brigade Headquarters)
- Infantry
  - 1st Battalion, Coldstream Guards
  - 2nd Battalion, Royal Anglian Regiment (Light Role Infantry)
    - C Company
  - 3rd Battalion, Mercian Regiment (Armoured Infantry)
  - The Highlanders, 4th Battalion, Royal Regiment of Scotland (Armoured Infantry)
- Armour
  - 9th/12th Royal Lancers (Prince of Wales's) (Formation Reconnaissance)
  - The Royal Scots Dragoon Guards (Carabiniers and Greys) (Armoured)
- Royal Artillery
  - 3rd Regiment Royal Horse Artillery (Light Role Artillery)
    - OP Sterga 2
  - 32nd Regiment Royal Artillery (UAV)
  - Elements of 5th Regiment Royal Artillery (STA)
    - 53 (Louisburg) Battery RA
- Royal Engineers
  - 32 Engineer Regiment
- Royal Electrical and Mechanical Engineers
  - 2 (Close Support) Battalion REME
- Royal Logistic Corps
  - 2 Logistic Support Regiment RLC
- Army Medical Services
  - 2nd Medical Regiment, Royal Army Medical Corps

=== Operation Herrick XX ===
June 2014 - December 2014:

- UK contingent commander: Brigadier James Swift (June 2014 - December 2014)
- Elements of 20th Armoured Brigade HQ
- HQ 102 Logistic Brigade
- Infantry
  - Elements of 1st Battalion, The Princess of Wales’s Royal Regiment
  - 2nd Battalion, The Rifles
  - 5th Battalion, The Rifles
  - Elements of 7th Battalion, The Rifles
- Armour
  - 1st The Queen's Dragoon Guards
  - Elements of the Queen's Royal Hussars
- Royal Artillery
  - Elements of 5th Regiment K 'Hondeghem' Bty
  - 26th Regiment
  - Elements of 39th Regiment
  - Elements of 47th Regiment
    - 43 Battery Watchkeeper UAS
- Royal Engineers
  - 64 Works Group
  - Elements of 33 Regiment (Explosive Ordnance Disposal)
  - Elements of 35 Regiment
  - Elements of 42 Regiment (Geographic)
- Royal Electrical and Mechanical Engineers
  - 3 Close Support Battalion
  - Elements of 102 Battalion
- Royal Logistic Corps
  - 2 Operational Support Group
  - 1 Regiment
  - Elements of 6 Regiment
  - Elements of 7 Regiment
  - Elements of 11 Explosive Ordnance Disposal Regiment
  - Elements of 13 Air Assault Support Regiment
  - Elements of 29 Regiment
  - Elements of 150 (Yorkshire) Transport Regiment
  - Elements of 159 Supply Regiment
  - Elements of Headquarters Expeditionary Forces Institute and 148 (Expeditionary Forces Institute) Squadron
- Army Medical Services
  - 1st Armoured Medical Regiment Royal Army Medical Corps (RAMC)
  - 2nd Medical Brigade (United Kingdom) RAMC
    - 34 Field Hospital
  - Elements of 1st Military Working Dog Regiment
- Royal Signals
  - 1st (United Kingdom) Armoured Division Headquarters and Signal Regiment
  - Elements of 10 Regiment
  - Elements of 14 Regiment (Electronic Warfare)
  - Elements of 15 Regiment (Information Support)
  - Elements of 30 Regiment
- Military Intelligence
  - Elements of 1 Military Intelligence Battalion
  - Elements of 2 Military Intelligence Battalion
  - Elements of 4 Military Intelligence Battalion
- Police
  - Elements of 1st Regiment RMP
  - Elements of Special Investigation Branch (United Kingdom) RMP
  - Elements of Close Protection Unit RMP
  - No. 2 Tactical Police Squadron RAF
  - Elements of the Military Provost Staff
- Royal Air Force
  - No. 7 Force Protection Wing RAF (HQ)
  - No. 15 Squadron RAF Regiment
  - No. 34 Squadron RAF Regiment
  - No. 609 Squadron Royal Auxiliary Air Force (RAuxAF)

== Kabul Support Unit ==
- 1st Battalion, Coldstream Guards from February 2014 to August 2014.
  - HQ Company
  - No. 1 Company
  - No. 2 Company
  - Elements of No. 4 (Support) Company

== Logistic Support ==
Supporting the UK force is HQ Joint Force Support (Afghanistan)(JFSp(A)). This 1* headquarters has commands the:

- Theatre Logistics Group
  - Joint Movements Unit
  - Reverse Supply Chain Squadron
  - Reverse Support Chain Squadron
  - Transport Troop
  - Vehicle Replenishment Section
- Theatre Provost Group
- Theatre Medical Group
- Theatre Equipment Support Group
  - Joint Helicopter Support Unit
  - Equipment Support Company
  - Redeployment Platoon

== Stabilisation Teams ==
- Military Stabilisation Support Team
  - Lashkar Gah District Stabilisation Team
