= Main Operating Base Lashkar Gah =

MOB Lashkar Gah
- Lashkargah District, Helmand Province in Afghanistan

Site information
- Owner: International Security Assistance Force (ISAF)
- Operator: British Army

Location
- Shown within Afghanistan
- Coordinates: 31°36′09″N 064°22′19″E

Site history
- Built: 2006
- In use: 2006-2014

Airfield information
- Elevation: 787 metres (2,582 ft) AMSL
Helipads
| Number | Length and surface |
|---|---|
| 01 | Concrete |
| 02 | Concrete |

MOB Lashkar Gah was a British Army main operating base located in Lashkargah District, Helmand Province, Afghanistan.

The base was formerly used by Task Force Helmand HQ until 9 August 2013 and was controlled under Operation Herrick. The base was handed over to the Afghan National Army on 24 February 2014.

== History ==
Units stationed at the base included:

- Operation Herrick 4 – 16 Air Assault Brigade (May 2006 – November 2006).
  - Lashkar Gah PRT
- Operation Herrick 5 – 3 Commando Brigade HQ (November 2006 – April 2007).
- Operation Herrick 6 – 12th Mechanized Brigade HQ (April 2007 – October 2007).
- Operation Herrick 7 – 52nd Infantry Brigade HQ (October 2007 – April 2008).
- Operation Herrick 8 – 16 Air Assault Brigade HQ (April 2008 – October 2008).
- Operation Herrick 9 – 3 Commando Brigade HQ (October 2008 – April 2009).
- Operation Herrick 10 – 19th Light Brigade HQ (April 2009 – October 2009).
- Operation Herrick 11 – 11 Light Brigade HQ (October 2009 – April 2010).
- Operation Herrick 12 – 4th Mechanized Brigade HQ (April 2010 – October 2010).
- Operation Herrick 13 – 16 Air Assault Brigade HQ (October 2010 – April 2011).
- Operation Herrick 14 – 3 Commando Brigade HQ (April 2011 – October 2011).
- Operation Herrick 15 – 20th Armoured Brigade HQ (October 2011 – April 2012).
- Operation Herrick 16 – 12th Mechanized Brigade HQ (April 2012 – October 2012).
- Operation Herrick 17 – 4th Mechanized Brigade HQ (October 2012 – April 2013).
- Operation Herrick 18 – 1st Mechanized Brigade HQ (April 2013 – October 2013).
- Operation Herrick 19 – 2nd Battalion, Royal Anglian Regiment (October 2013 – 24 February 2014).

== See also ==
- List of ISAF installations in Afghanistan
- Operation Herrick order of battle
