= Sangar (fortification) =

Temporary military fortified position

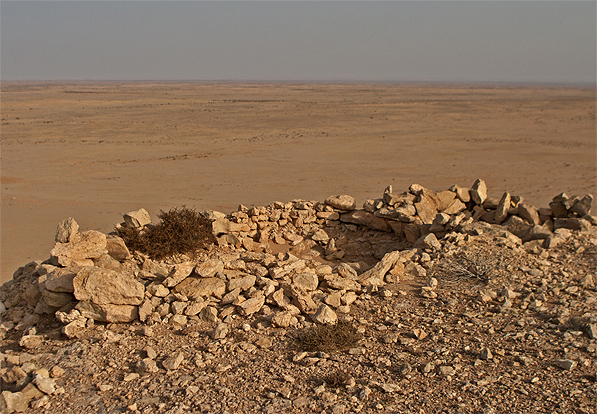
Sangar from the Western Sahara conflict probably dating from the 1980s

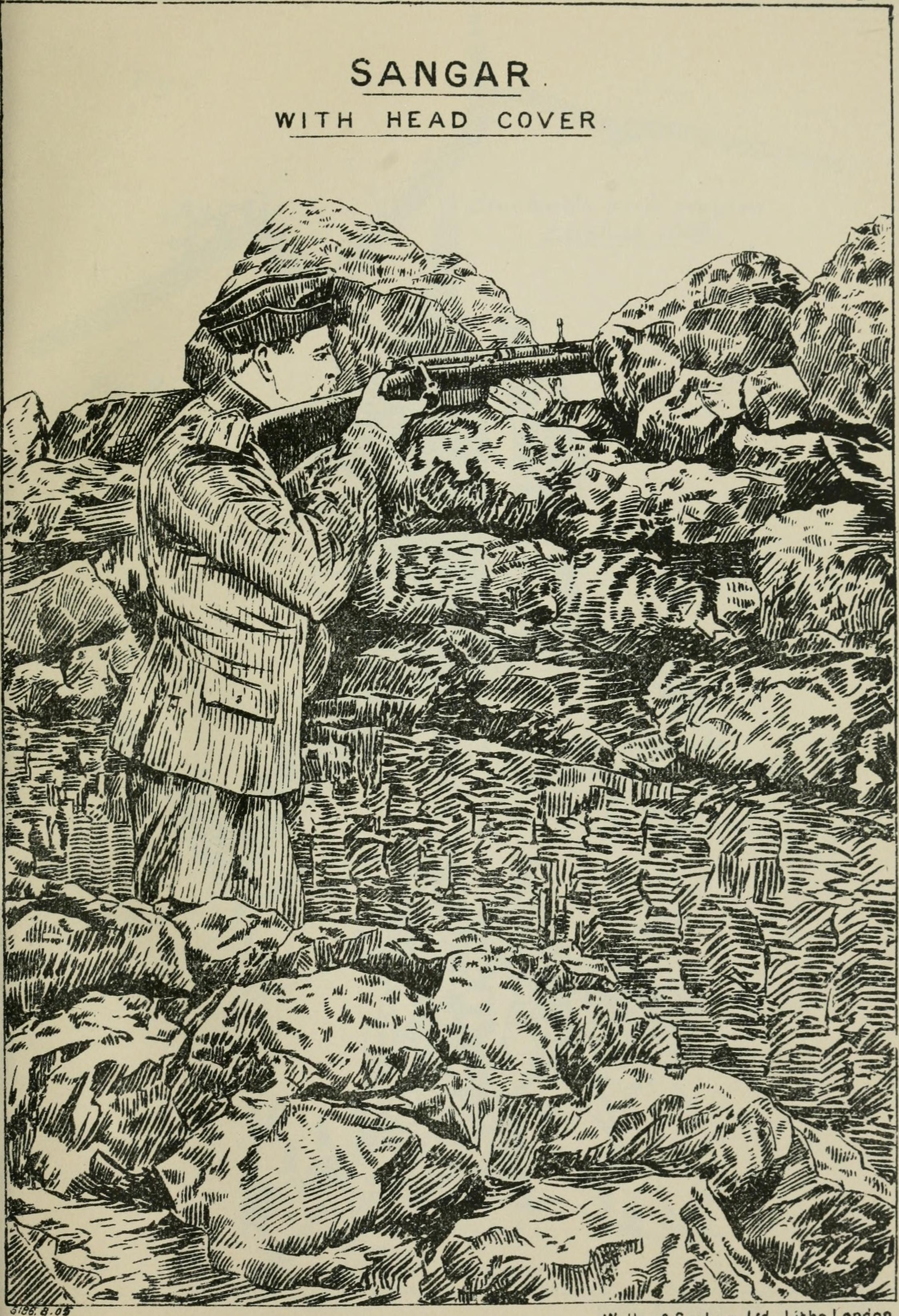
Illustration from the Manual of Military Engineering (1905)

A sangar (Persian: سنگر, also sanger) is a temporary fortified position with a breastwork originally constructed of stones, and now built of sandbags, gabions or similar materials. Sangars are normally constructed in terrain where the digging of trenches would not be practicable. The term is still frequently used by the British Army, but has now been extended to cover a wider range of small fortified positions.

== Etymology ==
The word was adopted from Hindi and Pashto and derives originally from the Persian word sang, "stone". Its first appearance in English (as recorded by the Oxford English Dictionary) is in the form sunga, and dates from 1841. The word has also occasionally been used as a verb, meaning "to fortify with a sangar": however, this usage appears to have been limited to the first decade of the 20th century.

== Traditional usage ==
The term was originally used by the British Indian Army to describe small temporary fortified positions on the North West Frontier and in Afghanistan. It was widely used by the British during the Italian Campaign of the Second World War. The term is also used by the British Royal Air Force to describe fortified guard positions on airfields.

== Modern usage ==
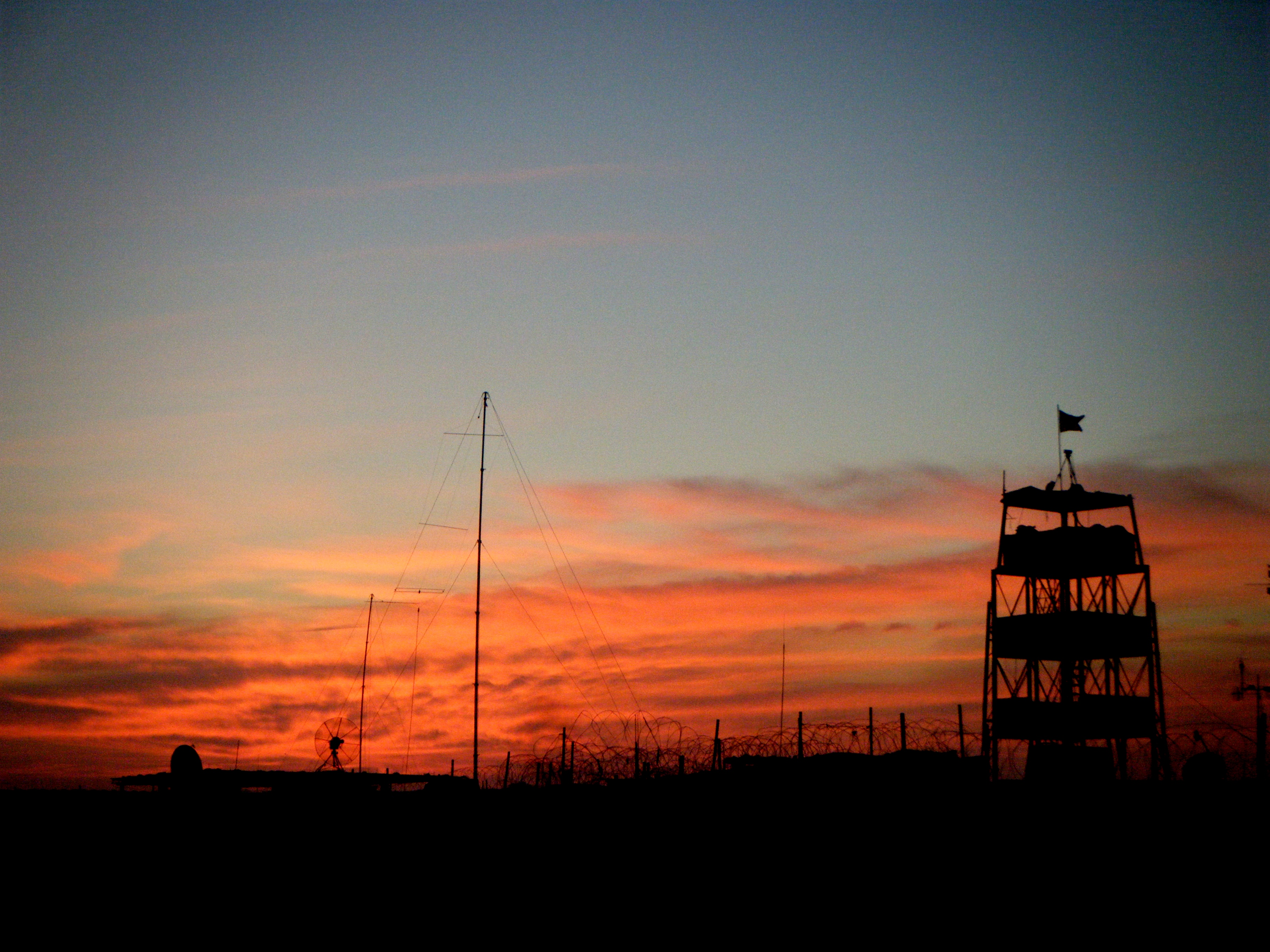
Supersangar at the British forward operating base, Price, Gereshk, Afghanistan (photograph taken in 2013 during the War in Afghanistan)

More recently, the use of the term has been extended to cover a wider range of small, semi-permanent fortified positions. The Independent Monitoring Commission stated immediately after The Troubles in Northern Ireland:

The British Army use other terms to classify their sites covered by our definition [of towers and observation posts]. For the avoidance of any doubt we set out below the military terms we have deemed to be included in this part of the report.

Sangar: A sangar is a protected sentry post, normally located around the perimeter of a base. Its main function is to provide early warning of enemy/terrorist activity/attack in order to protect forces both within the base and those deployed within sight of the sangar.

Supersangar: A supersangar is an elevated sangar and may be indistinguishable from what is commonly termed a tower.

== See also ==
- List of established military terms
