= Peter Gilchrist =

Peter Gilchrist may refer to:

- Peter Gilchrist (British Army officer) (born 1952), retired senior British Army officer
- Peter Gilchrist (billiards player) (born 1968), Singaporean English billiards player
