= Nick Pope (British Army officer) =

British Army general

Lieutenant General Sir Nick Pope KCB CBE
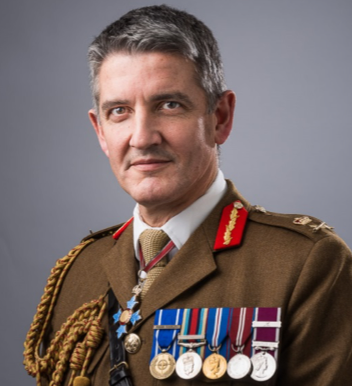
- Born: 1962 (age 63–64)
- Military career
- Allegiance: United Kingdom
- Branch: British Army
- Service years: 1981 – 2020
- Rank: Lieutenant General
- Service number: 513735
- Commands: 1st Signal Brigade; 30th Signal Regiment
- Conflicts: Bosnian War; War in Afghanistan
- Awards: Knight Commander of the Order of the Bath; Commander of the Order of the British Empire

Lieutenant General Sir Nicholas Arthur William Pope, KCB, CBE (born 1962) is a former senior British Army officer. He served as the last Master-General of the Ordnance from 2011 to 2013 when the position was abolished and then as Deputy Chief of the General Staff from 2015 to 2019.

== Early life and education ==
Pope was born in 1962. He was educated at Desborough School in Maidenhead, and Jesus College, Cambridge.

== Military career ==
Pope was commissioned into the Royal Corps of Signals in 1981. He commanded the independent signal squadron in Headquarters, 19th Mechanised Brigade in 1997 and was deployed in that role to Bosnia. He was appointed Commanding Officer of 30th Signal Regiment in November 2000 and became Deputy Director of Defence Resources and Plans at the Ministry of Defence in late 2002. He went on to be Commander of 1st Signal Brigade at Rheindahlen in September 2005 and was subsequently deployed to Afghanistan.

He was appointed Strategic Communication Officer to the Chief of the Defence Staff in Spring 2011 and became Director of Battlefield Manoeuvre and Master-General of the Ordnance in November 2011. He became Director General Capability in October 2013, and Deputy Chief of the General Staff in December 2015. Pope was Master of the Royal Corps of Signals and Colonel Commandant of the Brigade of Gurkhas.

Pope was appointed Knight Commander of the Order of the Bath (KCB) in the 2019 Birthday Honours.

In 2022, he was appointed as Chair of Cobseo, the military charities confederation. He was also appointed Non Executive Director of Pearson Engineering, a defence manufacturing company in Newcastle upon Tyne. Pope is also Chair of Governors at Godolphin School in Salisbury.

Military offices
Preceded by Bill Moore	Master-General of the Ordnance; 2011–2013	Post abolished
Preceded by Mark Poffley	Deputy Chief of the General Staff; 2015–2019	Succeeded by Christopher Tickell
