= Main Operating Base Price =

MOB Price ~~FOB Price~~
- Gereshk, Helmand Province in Afghanistan
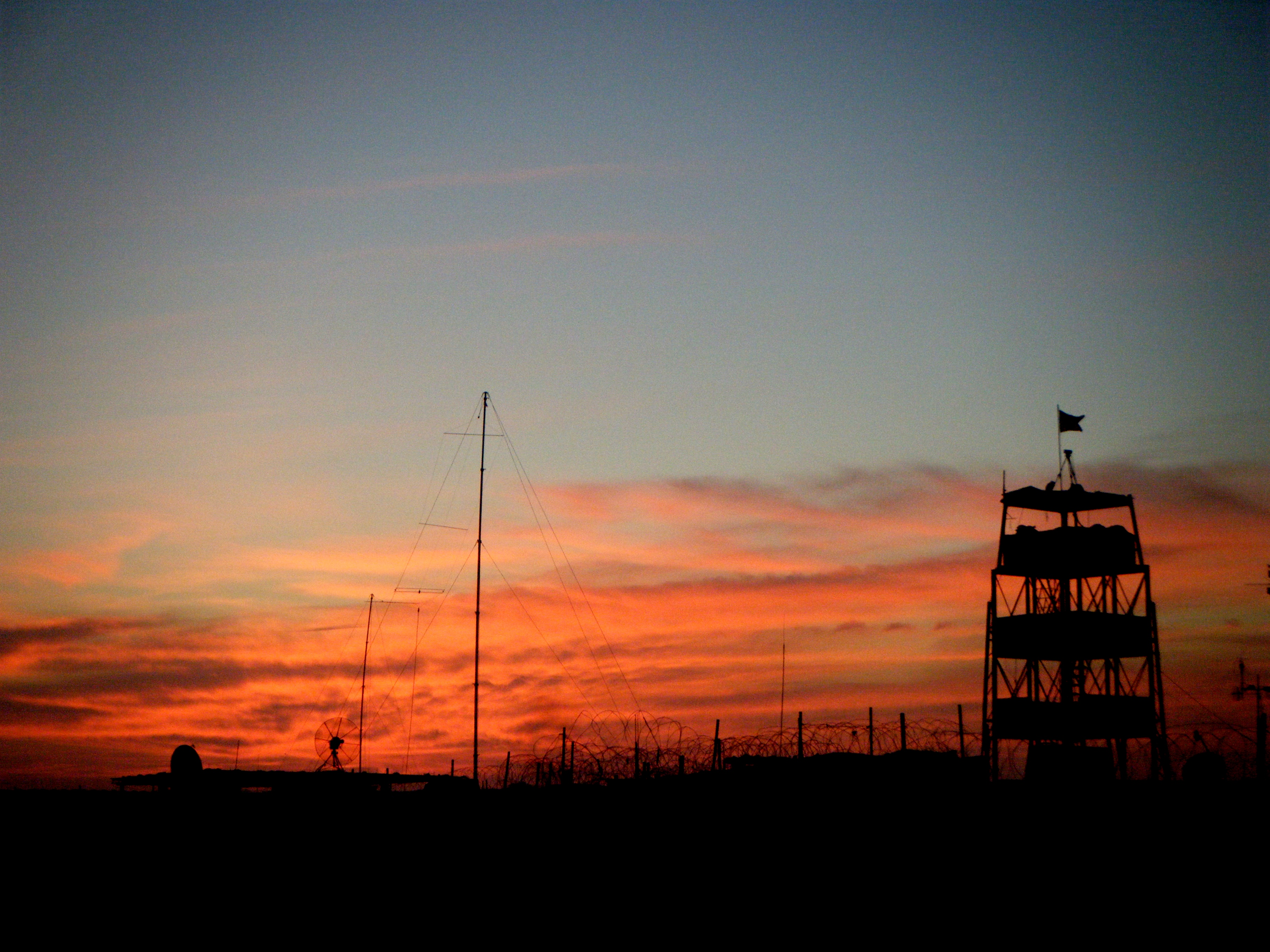

Site information
- Type: Main Operating Base
- Owner: International Security Assistance Force (ISAF)
- Operator: British Army

Location
- Shown within Afghanistan
- Coordinates: 31°49′08″N 064°33′28″E

Site history
- Built: 2006
- In use: 2006-2012 as FOB Price; 2012-2014 as MOB Price

Garrison information
- Occupants: British Army; United States Army; Danish Defence

Airfield information
- Elevation: 835 metres (2,740 ft) AMSL
Helipads
Number	Length and surface
00	Dirt

MOB Price is a former International Security Assistance Force (ISAF) Main Operating Base located in Nahri Saraj District, Helmand Province, Afghanistan

It was formerly a forward operating base until 2012 but has been expanded.

== History ==
The base started operating in 2006, and between 2007 and 22 July 2013, it was the headquarters of the Danish Battle Group, the British used the base between 2006 and 2014 when the base was closed by Marine Special operations Team 8213 from 2d Marine Raider Battalion, under Operation Herrick (OP H).

Despite the draw-down of British troops, this base has been expanded by 21 Engineer Regiment in November 2012.

=== British units ===
It has been used by:

- OP H IV – 16 Air Assault Brigade (May 2006 – November 2006):
  - 3rd Battalion, Parachute Regiment.
- OP H V – 3 Commando Brigade (November 2006 – April 2007):
  - J Company 42 Commando.
- OP H VI – 12th Mechanized Brigade (April 2007 – October 2007):
- OP H VII – 52nd Infantry Brigade (October 2007 – April 2008):
- OP H VIII – 16 Air Assault Brigade (April 2008 – October 2008):
- OP H IX – 3 Commando Brigade (October 2008 – April 2009):
- OP H X – 19th Light Brigade (April 2009 – October 2009):
- OP H XI – 11 Light Brigade (October 2009 – April 2010):
- OP H XII – 4th Mechanized Brigade (April 2010 – October 2010):
- OP H XIII – 16 Air Assault Brigade (October 2010 – April 2011):
- OP H XIV – 3 Commando Brigade: (April 2011 – October 2011):
  - A Squadron, 9th/12th Royal Lancers.
  - Brimstone One-Four, a four-man RAF, Army and Royal Marines Counter-Improvised Explosive Device team.
- OP H XV – 20th Armoured Brigade (October 2011 – April 2012):
  - B Squadron, 1st The Queen's Dragoon Guards.
- OP H XVI – 12th Mechanized Brigade: (April 2012 – October 2012):
  - 1st Battalion Grenadier Guards.
  - 19th Regiment Royal Artillery.
- OP H XVII – 4th Mechanized Brigade (October 2012 – April 2013):
  - 40 Commando (Royal Marines) with the base being nicknamed HMS Price.
  - The Royal Scots Borderers, 1st Battalion, The Royal Regiment of Scotland
  - 4th Regiment Royal Artillery.

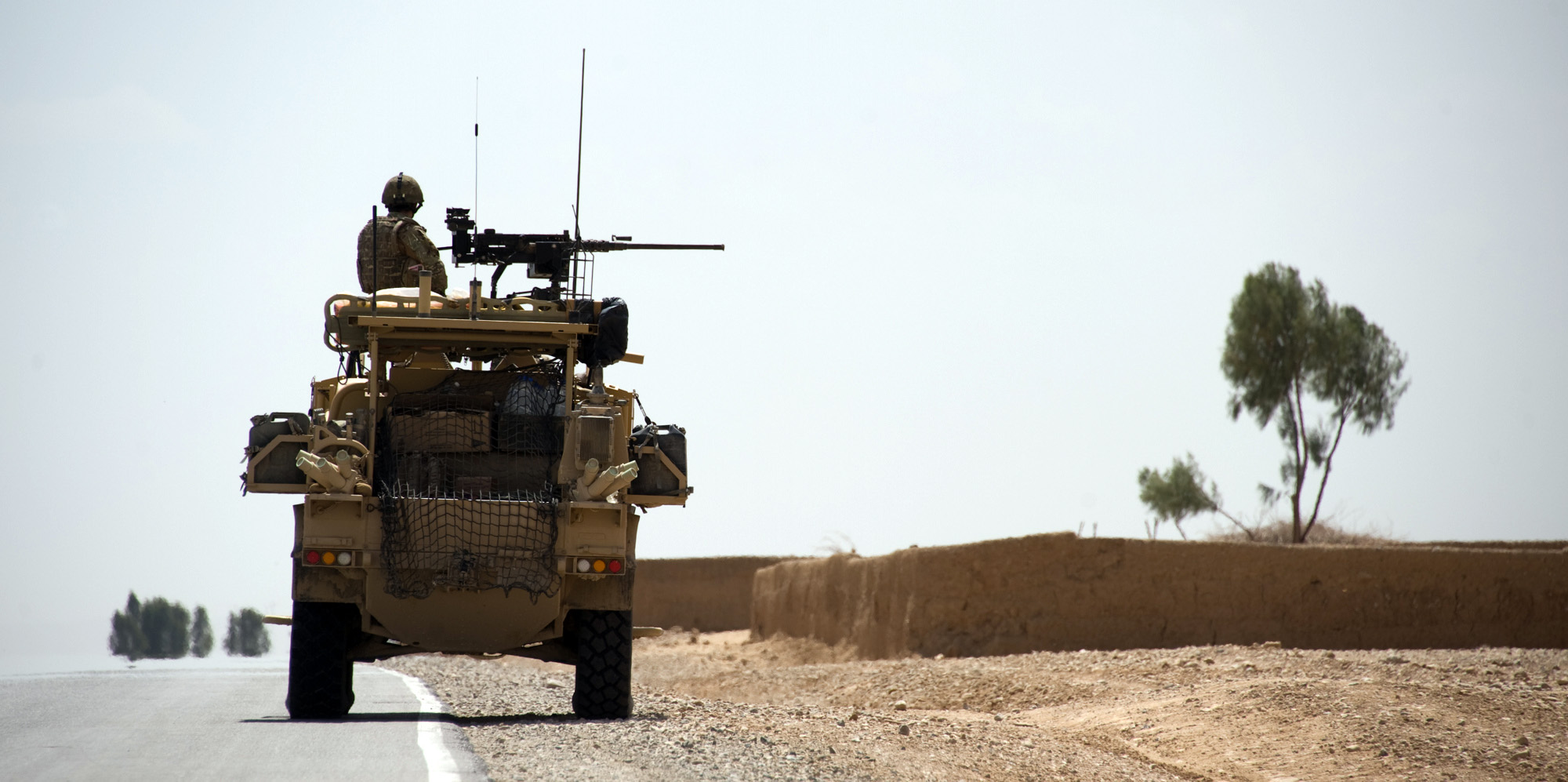
A Jackal on patrol from MOB Price

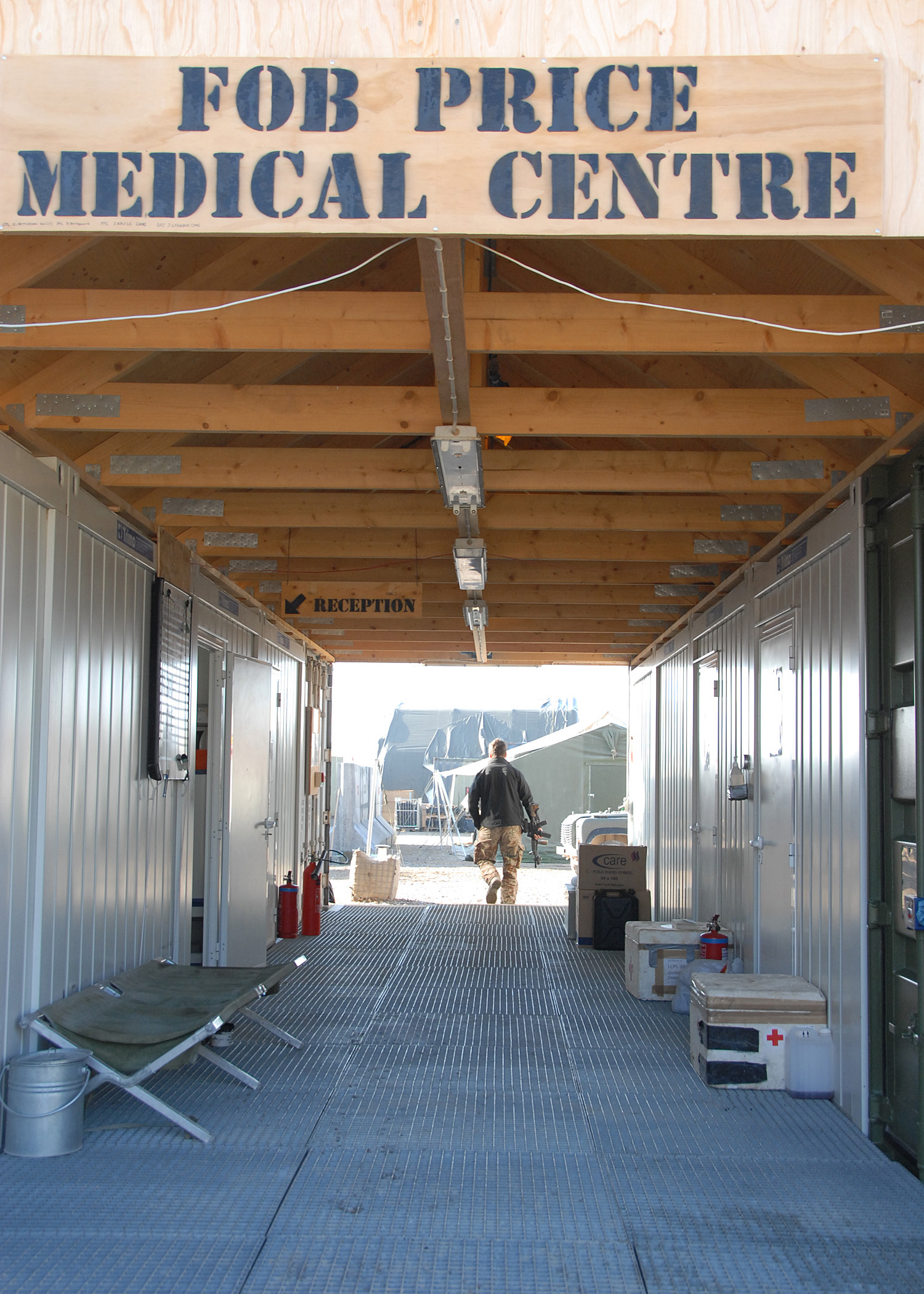
The base medical centre

- OP H XVIII – 1st Mechanized Brigade (April 2013 – October 2013):
  - 2nd Royal Tank Regiment.
  - 1st Battalion Royal Regiment of Fusiliers.
  - 4th Battalion The Rifles (Brigade Advisory Group).
  - 1st Regiment Royal Horse Artillery Fire support team (L (Ńery) Battery and E Battery with RAF Regiment JTAC).
- OP H XIX – 7th Armoured Brigade (October 2013 – April 2014):
  - 3rd Battalion, The Mercian Regiment.

=== American units ===
1st Platoon, A Battery, 3rd Battalion, 17th Field Artillery Regiment, 5th Stryker Brigade Combat Team, and 2nd Infantry Division were posted to FOB Price between January 2010 and May 2010 to conduct fire support.

Charlie Company, 4th Battalion, and 23rd Infantry Regiment in February 2012.

Embedded Training Team (ETT), 6th Kandak, 4th Brigade, 205th Corp (6/4/205) operated out of FOB Price from May 2009 to September 2009. This ETT was part of Combined Task Force Phoenix.

Charlie (Cobra) Company 2-5 IN 3/1 AD from 10 February 2014 to 15 July 2014, when the base was turned over to ANA / ANSF forces.

3rd & 7th Special Forces Group, Ft. Bragg, NC 2006.

Embedded Training Team, Police Mentor Team, RC South, Task Force Phoenix, South Carolina National Guard and New York National Guard, Team Mongoose, 2007–2008

1st & 2nd Marine Raider Battalions, 2007–2014

== Future ==
The base was closed down in March 2014.

== See also ==
- List of ISAF installations in Afghanistan
- Operation Herrick order of battle
