= 15 Air Assault Support Squadron RLC =

15 Air Assault Support Squadron
- Active: 1878 – 2013; 2022 –
- Country: United Kingdom
- Branch: British Army
- Type: Close support
- Role: Logistical support
- Part of: 13 Air Assault Regiment RLC
- Garrison/HQ: Roman Barracks, Colchester

Insignia
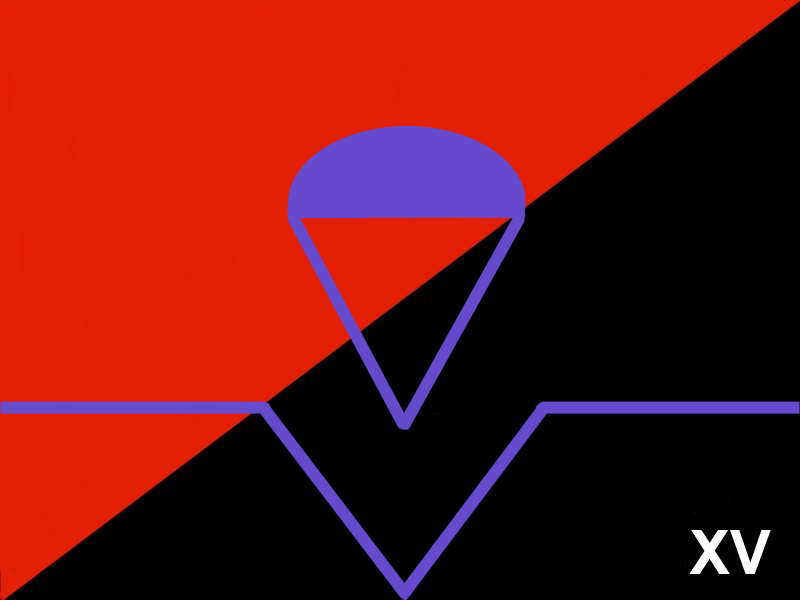
- Tactical Recognition Flash

15 Air Assault Support Squadron is a British Army logistic squadron, currently under 13 Air Assault Support Regiment RLC.

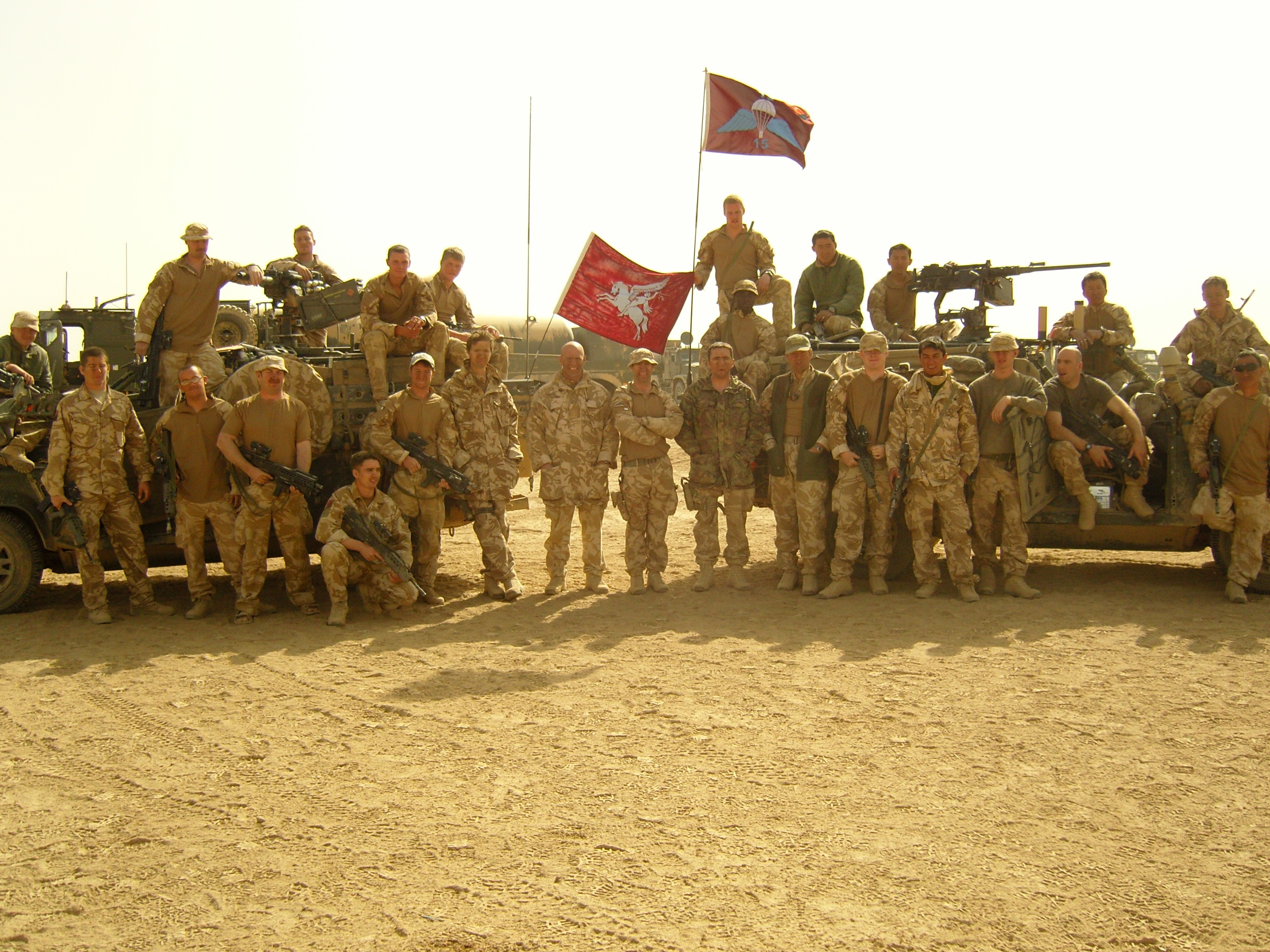

== History ==
The Squadron was formed at Woolwich on May 8, 1878, with a group of men and their horses. Soon afterwards, the horses were replaced with mules and the Company found itself employed on transport duties throughout the British Empire. The company was deployed to the Egyptian Campaign of 1882-1883, and to South Africa from 1889 to 1902 where they deployed on supply tasks during the Second Boer War. The company also fought in Somaliland in 1904 prior to its return to Britain. When World War I broke out, 15 Company was deployed to France, equipped with horse transport, in support of the British Expeditionary Force. The Company disbanded in 1919 on its return to Britain. The Unit was reformed in 1922 as 15 Motor Transport Company Royal Army Service Corps and stationed at York.

== World War II ==
Again the company disbanded before reforming to enter World War II. In the beginning of the war, their duties were UK-based, operating with requisitioned civilian vehicles. In January 1942, the company received a fleet of AEC Matadors and deployed on operations in the tank transporting role. The Unit was renamed 24 Company RASC and served in the Middle East, including transport duties at the Battle of El Alamein. After the defeat of the Afrika Korps, the Unit reverted to 15 Company and returned to Britain prior to its involvement in the invasion of Europe in 1944.

== Post World War II ==
After World War II, 15 Company was disbanded for a third time, only to reappear at York in 1951 as a General Transport (GT) Company. In 1961 the Company disbanded for a fourth time, yet its title was revived when 122 (Tipper) Company RASC, based in Scarborough Barracks Osnabrück, West Germany, was renamed 15 Company RASC. The Unit took on the GT role for a second time in January 1965 when they exchanged Tipper and assault vehicles for 4 ton vehicles. Four months later, equipped with AEC Mk 1 10 ton cargo vehicles, the Unit changed its title on disbandment of the RASC to become 15 Squadron Royal Corps of Transport (RCT). The Unit saw a period of stability and celebrated its centenary in 1978 in Osnabrück.

== 1980s ==
The Squadron returned to the UK in 1983 and was based in Gaza Barracks, Catterick as part of the 2nd Infantry Division Transport Regiment; its vehicle fleet was also changed from the 10 ton AEC to Bedford TM 8 tonne, 4 x 22,000-litre Truck Tanker Fuel (TTFs) and associated Materials Handling Equipment (MHE). In 1990, the Squadron deployed to Cyprus in support of the UNFICYP under the command of Major Steve Bragg and was mainly made up of Territorial Army (TA) personnel. The regular troops were deployed on Operation Granby (Gulf War 1) as sub-units of other squadrons.

== 1990s ==
In 1993, the Logistic Support Review and Options for Change saw the amalgamation of the RCT with the other Corps to become the Royal Logistic Corps. At the same time, 24 Airmobile Brigade was established in Colchester requiring a Combat Service Support (CSS) Battalion. 15 Squadron already had a troop in support of the Airmobile Brigade, however now the whole unit become a second-line transport sub-unit of the CSS Battalion. The fleet consisted of DROPS MMLC, 14, 8 and 4 ton General Service Vehicles, Truck Tanker Fuel (TTFs), Unit Bulk Refuel Equipment (UBRE) and various Material Handling Equipment (MHE).

The Squadron was again re-roled and renamed 15 Attack Support Squadron due to the formation of 16 Air Assault Brigade and the arrival of the Attack Helicopter (AH). In April 2000, the Squadron deployed on a six-month tour of Northern Ireland on Operation Banner. The Squadron acquired a new fleet of Multi Wheel Drive (MWD) fuel vehicles for the transportation of aviation fuel.

== CSS to 16 Air Assault Brigade ==
In 2001, the Squadron deployed to Macedonia on Operation Bessemer to assist with disarming the Macedonian population.

The Squadron deployed again to support the Brigade in 2001 upon short notice to Afghanistan as part of Operation FINGAL in support of US war on terrorism.

A period of stability was established until Operation TELIC in 2003 where the Regiment deployed to Kuwait and Iraq.

In March 2006, the Squadron deployed as 15 Close Support Squadron to Operation HERRICK 4, providing intimate CSS support to the 3 PARA battlegroup based in Helmand Province.

In 2007 the Squadron was redesignated 15 Air Assault Close Support Squadron and now constantly maintains a parachute element for insertion onto a Drop Zone.

The Squadron deployed to Afghanistan in March 2008 on Op HERRICK 8, where it conducted numerous Combat Logistic Patrols to Sangin, Musa Qaleh and Now Zad. Members of the Squadron were responsible for the protection and transportation of a turbine to the Kajaki Dam during Operation OQAB TSUKA (Eagles Summit in Pashtu).

The squadron disbanded in 2013, in the re-organisation of the army.

== Future Soldier ==
The squadron was reformed in April 2022, as the Gurkha-manned 15 Air Assault Support Squadron, through the renaming and re-subordination of 60 Close Support Squadron from 4 Regiment RLC.
