= 10 Queen's Own Gurkha Logistic Regiment RLC =

British Army unit

10 The Queen's Own Gurkha Logistic Regiment
- Active: 2001–present
- Country: United Kingdom
- Branch: British Army
- Type: Regiment; 556 personnel
- Part of: Royal Logistic Corps
- Garrison/HQ: Gale Barracks, Aldershot

The Queen's Own Gurkha Logistic Regiment, also known as 10 The Queen's Own Gurkha Logistic Regiment or 10 QOGLR, is a regiment of the British Army's Royal Logistic Corps.

== History ==
The regiment was created on 5 April 2001. It was formed as a merger of The Queen's Own Gurkha Transport Regiment, The Gurkha Transport Regiment and The Gurkha Army Service Corps which formed as component parts of The Brigade of Gurkhas on 1 July 1958. A post on the Gurkha Brigade website in August 2016 noted that a further two new QOGLR squadrons will be formed in the future.

- Structure:
  - 36 Headquarters Squadron
  - 1 Supply Squadron
  - 28 Fuel and General Transport Squadron
  - 15 Air Assault Support Squadron (under operational command of 13 Air Assault Support Regiment RLC)
  - 94 Supply Squadron (under operational command of 9 Regiment RLC)
