= Bill Moore (British Army officer) =

Major General Bill Moore CBE
- Military career
- Allegiance: United Kingdom
- Branch: British Army
- Service years: 1977 –
- Rank: Major General
- Commands: 7th Parachute Regiment Royal Horse Artillery; 19th Mechanized Brigade
- Conflicts: Iraq War
- Awards: Commander of the Order of the British Empire

Major General William Hewitt Moore CBE (born 24 February 1958) is a British Army officer who served as Master-General of the Ordnance.

== Military career ==
Moore was commissioned into the Royal Artillery in 1977. He was appointed Commanding Officer of 7th Parachute Regiment Royal Horse Artillery in 1996. He became Colonel Force Development in the Directorate General of Doctrine and Development in 1998 and operational commander for the Sierra Leone Armed Forces in 2001 before becoming Commander of 19th Mechanized Brigade in December 2001 prior to the Brigade's deployment to Iraq in 2003. He went on to be Director of Equipment Capability (Ground Manoeuvre) at the Ministry of Defence in 2004, Director General Logistics, Support and Equipment at HQ Land Forces in 2007 and Deputy Commanding General for the Multi-National Corps – Iraq in 2009. He became Director of Battlefield Manoeuvre and Master-General of the Ordnance in 2010.

== Family ==
He is married to Jane; they have two sons.

Military offices
Preceded by Richard Barrons	Deputy Commanding General Multi-National Corps – Iraq; 2009–2010	Succeeded by Corps disbanded
Preceded by Chris Wilson	Master-General of the Ordnance; 2010–2011	Succeeded by Nick Pope
