= 13 Air Assault Support Regiment RLC =

- Active: 1999 - present
- Country: United Kingdom
- Branch: British Army
- Type: Airborne
- Role: Logistics
- Size: Regiment; 667 personnel
- Part of: 16 Air Assault Brigade Combat Team
- Garrison/HQ: Merville Barracks, Colchester Garrison
- Engagements: Operation Banner; Operation Telic; Operation Herrick; Operation Pitting
- Website: 13 Air Assault Support Regiment RLC

13 Air Assault Support Regiment RLC is a regiment of the Royal Logistic Corps of the British Army, under the command of 16 Air Assault Brigade Combat Team.

== History ==
The regiment was formed in 1999, upon the formation of 16 Air Assault Brigade, in order to provide logistical support to the brigade.

Elements of the regiment were deployed on Operation Herrick XX, the final phase of the UK’s combat operations in Afghanistan, that came to an end on 31 December 2014.

The regiment was deployed to Kabul on Operation Pitting, tasked to help evacuate British nationals and entitled Afghans as the Taliban took over Afghanistan in 2021.

== Structure ==
The regiment's current structure is as follows:

- 24 Headquarters Squadron
- 47 Air Despatch Squadron - work closely with the RAF to deliver logistic support.
- 15 Air Assault Support Squadron (QOGLR)
- 63 Air Assault Support Squadron - supports 2 PARA.
- 82 Air Assault Support Squadron - supports 3 PARA.
- 8 Parachute Field Company, Royal Electrical and Mechanical Engineers
- 65 Troop – a specialised unit that provides direct support to out of area operations.
