= Nicholas Merbury =

Member of the Parliament of England

Nicholas Merbury (died 1421) was an English administrator, member of parliament and first Master of the Ordnance.

He was probably the son of Sir Thomas Merbury of Northamptonshire. He was the brother of Sir Laurence Merbury, Lord Treasurer of Ireland, and of John Merbury, MP for Herefordshire. He begin his career in the service of Henry Percy, 1st Earl of Northumberland and was present, in September 1402, at the Battle of Humbleton Hill in Northumberland. After Percy's downfall, he transferred his allegiance to King Henry IV.

He was appointed a justice of the peace for Northamptonshire in 1412, serving until 1417. He was elected member of parliament for Northamptonshire in 1413 and 1414.

He sat on a number of commissions and in 1414 was tasked with recruiting workmen for the Ordnance, after which he was appointed the first Master of the Ordnance for life. He also held a number of other lifetime public appointments such as Usher of the King's chamber (1415), Chief Butler of England (1418), Chirographer of the common pleas (1420), Keeper of the King's jewels and privy purse (1421) and Bailiff of the royal forest of Cliffe, Northants.

He married in 1411, Margaret, the widow of Edward le Latimer, 6th Baron Latimer of Braybrook. They had no children. Nicholas's estates passed to his brother Sir Laurence, and then apparently to their niece Elizabeth, Lady Devereux.
