= 53 (Louisburg) Battery Royal Artillery =

British Army artillery battery

53 (Louisburg) Air Assault Battery, Royal Artillery
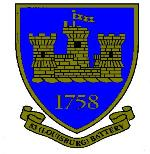
- Active: 1 Apr 1740 – date
- Country: UK
- Branch: Royal Artillery
- Type: Regular Army
- Role: Surveillance and Target Acquisition
- Size: Battery
- Part of: 5th Regiment Royal Artillery
- Location: Catterick Garrison
- Anniversaries: Louisburg Day 27 July
- Equipment: LCMR
- Engagements: Siege of Louisburg
- Battle honours: Ubique

53 (Louisburg) Air Assault Battery is the second most senior artillery battery. Formed in 1740, the battery is currently part of 5th Regiment Royal Artillery and is based at Marne Barracks, Catterick, North Yorkshire. The battery operates in a Surveillance and Target Acquisition role in support of 16 Air Assault Brigade Combat Team.

== Coat of arms ==
Former Shield of Nova Scotia

The battery coat of arms is a gold-blue-gold stable belt derived from the "Shield" of Nova Scotia 1867–1929, representing the earth banks either side of the St Lawrence River as authorised circa 1904. The shield depicts 3 thistles, which represent the 3 municipalities of Nova Scotia (New Scotland) and the salmon is shown swimming west.

== History ==
53 (Louisburg) Air Assault Battery descended from Captain Melledge's Company, formed in 1740 at Royal Artillery Barracks, Woolwich. It saw service in the Caribbean, protecting and expanding British interests until 1743 when it returned to Woolwich. In 1745 the company departed for the new territories, newly acquired from the French, in Canada and commenced garrison duties. From 1751 to 1758, the company was commanded by Captain Charles Brome.

=== Seven Years' War ===
It was in 1758 that the second Battle of Louisbourg took place, and the company, commanded by Captain T Ord from 23 May 1758, played a pivotal role in securing the town. The honour title "Louisburg" commemorates the first stage of the campaign in Canada against the French in the Siege of Louisbourg; it was first launched from Halifax (Nova Scotia). The company's contribution to the siege was an integral part of the sea-borne assault to capture the Fortress of Louisbourg which would allow the Royal Navy to sail down the St. Lawrence River for an attack on Quebec unmolested. The ground around Louisburg did not lend itself well to artillery, being composed mainly of swamp and marsh.

In honour of the company commander during the battle, Captain T Ord, the Battery HQ Troop is called "Ord’s" Troop. "A" Troop is named after Captain J Anderson, who commanded the company in 1858 during the Indian Rebellion of 1857 and "B" Troop after Captain N S K Bayliss who was company commander in 1855 during the Siege of Sevastopol (1854–1855). The company served in Canada until 1766 and then spent the rest of the eighteenth century in various theatres of the British Empire including the Mediterranean and the Caribbean.

=== Nineteenth century ===
The company bombarded the French invasion fleet in Dieppe in 1801 and taking part in the Siege of Copenhagen in 1807. The company then spent a long deployment in Ireland from 1811 until 1849, when it took up coastal defence duties. At that time, all batteries in the Royal Artillery were called "companies" and named after their company commander. In 1859, batteries were formed and the practice of naming the sub-units after their commanders ceased and all new batteries were given either a letter or number. 53 (Louisburg) Battery is the second senior numbered battery in the Royal Regiment of Artillery with 19/5 Gibraltar Battery being the senior. In recognition of the tremendous achievement of the company during the Siege of Louisburg it was awarded the honour title 'Louisburg' on 3 May 1937. For the remainder of the nineteenth century, the battery served around the British Empire in Aden, India, Burma and Britain. Notable achievements during this time included the Crimea and Afghanistan. In the Crimea, the company took part in the Siege of Sebastopol, and the relief of Kandahar Garrison, Afghanistan in 1880.

=== Twentieth century ===
By the early 1900s, the battery returned to Britain and became part of the coastal defence forces until 1926. The battery then re-roled as a 'heavy gun' battery until 1947. In 1947, the battery was reformed and armed with Bofors 40/L60 Mk 3. It became part of 22nd Light Anti Aircraft Regiment Royal Artillery based in Germany. It was later reequipped with Bofors 40/L70 and FCE (Fire Control Equipment) No 7 Radars. During the period of the Emergency in Eastern Pacific, the battery deployed to Changi, Singapore in 1964. The battery then undertook a further tour to ensure stability in the region in 1966 to Tampin and Kuching, Borneo. In 1969, the battery title finally becomes recognisable as 53 (Louisburg) Light Air Defence Battery Royal Artillery.

The outbreak of the Troubles in Northern Ireland led to the battery deploying in an infantry role in 1972 to Derry. It then undertook further tours to Northern Ireland in the following years: 1973, 1974, 1978, 1987, 1993, 1997, and 1999. The battery also re-roled several times over this period with equipment changing from Bofors to the introduction of Rapier, Tracked Rapier, and finally Towed Rapier FSB2 (Field Standard B2). Elements from the battery deployed in 1990 in support of the first Gulf War and the 1990s the battery also deployed twice to Cyprus.

22nd AD Regiment Royal Artillery was placed in suspended animation in April 2004 and the battery was assigned to 5th Regiment Royal Artillery in Marne Barracks, Catterick on 21 July 2004. It has since converted to a Surveillance and Target Acquisition (STA) Role.

== Recent operations ==
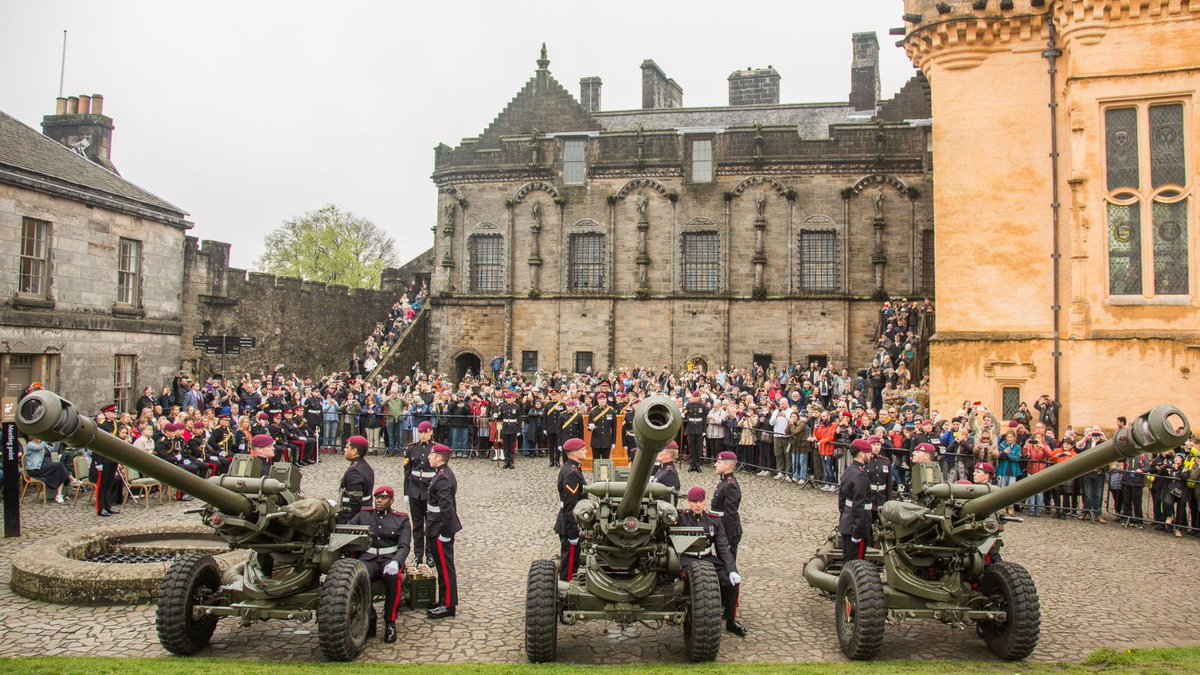
Soldiers from the Battery firing a Royal Gun Salute at Stirling Castle for the Coronation of Charles III and Camilla

Since joining 5th Regiment RA, 53 (Louisburg) Battery has served on Operation TELIC in Iraq twice and also on Operation HERRICK in Afghanistan four times. On 20 June 2014, the battery held are-rolling parade and subsequently became affiliated with 16th Air Assault Brigade.

== Chronology of campaigns ==
53 Company/Battery served in:

Year	Campaign	Location and remarks
1758	Siege of Louisbourg	Canada
1801	Dieppe	Nil
1807	Siege of Copenhagen	Nil
1854–55	Siege of Sevastopol (1854–1855)	Crimea
1857	Indian Rebellion of 1857	Nil
1878–80	Second Anglo-Afghan War	Nil
1914–18	Suvla, Gallipoli Campaign	World War I
1939–45	World War II	Europe
1964	Indonesia–Malaysia confrontation	Changi, Singapore
1966	Indonesia–Malaysia confrontation	Tampin and Kuching, Borneo
1972	Operation Banner	Derry, Northern Ireland
1973	Operation Banner	Unstated, Northern Ireland
1974	Operation Banner	Unstated, Northern Ireland
1978	Operation Banner	Unstated, Northern Ireland
1987	Operation Banner	Unstated, Northern Ireland
1993	Operation Banner	Unstated, Northern Ireland
1997	Operation Banner	Unstated, Northern Ireland
1999	Operation Banner	Unstated, Northern Ireland
1990	Operation Granby	Iraq
1990	Sovereign Base Areas / UNFICYP	British Forces Cyprus
2003	Operation Tosca, UNFICYP	British Forces Cyprus
2005	Operation Telic 6	Iraq
2007	Operation Telic 10	Iraq
2007	Operation Herrick 6	Afghanistan
2009	Operation Herrick 10	Afghanistan
2011	Operation Herrick 14	Afghanistan
2013–14	Operation Herrick 19	Afghanistan

== Early Captains ==
Below is a short list of the captains (commanding officers) of the battery:

- Captain George Fead (1782–1792)
- Cpt. Thomas R. Charleston (1792–1799)
- Cpt. William Cox (1799–1805)
- Cpt. William Millar (1805)
- Cpt. William Payne (1805–1816)
- Cpt. James S. Bastard (1816–1817)
- Cpt. J. F. Fead (1817–1821)
- Cpt. H. B. Lane (1821–1826)
- Cpt. Charles G. Napier (1826)
- Cpt. Thomas Scott (1826–1834)
- Cpt. William A. Raynes (1834–1843)
- Cpt. G. M. Glasgow (1843–1848)
- Cpt. H. J. Morris (1848–1851)
- Cpt. A. G. W. Hamilton (1851–1854)
- Cpt. A. C. Pigou (1854–????)

== See also ==
- List of Royal Artillery Batteries

== Sources ==
- Major Francis Duncan, History of the Royal Regiment of Artillery, Compiled from Original Records, Volume I, London John Murray, Albemarle Street 1879.
