= Master-General of the Ordnance =

Former senior British military officer

Office of the Master-General of the Ordnance
- Ministry of Defence
- Member of: Board of Ordnance, Army Board
- Reports to: Secretary of State for Defence
- Nominator: Secretary of State for Defence
- Appointer: Prime Minister; Subject to formal approval by the Queen-in-Council
- Term length: Not fixed (usually for life)
- Inaugural holder: Nicholas Merbury
- Formation: 1415–2013

The Master-General of the Ordnance (MGO) was a very senior British military position from 1415 to 2013 (except 1855–1895 and 1939–1958) with some changes to the name, usually held by a serving general. The Master-General of the Ordnance was responsible for all British artillery, engineers, fortifications, military supplies, transport, field hospitals and much else, and was not subordinate to the commander-in chief of the British military. In March 2013 the holder was titled as "Director Land Capability and Transformation", but still sat on the Army Board as Master-General of the Ordnance; in September 2013 the post was eliminated.

== History ==
The Office of Armoury split away from the Privy Wardrobe of the Tower (of London) in the early 15th century. The Master of the Ordnance came into being in 1415 with the appointment of Nicholas Merbury by Henry V. The Office of Ordnance was created by Henry VIII in 1544 and became the Board of Ordnance in 1597. Its head was the Master-General of the Ordnance; his subordinates included the Lieutenant-General of the Ordnance and the Surveyor-General of the Ordnance. Before the establishment of a standing army or navy, the Ordnance Office was the only permanent military department in England. In 1764 it established the British standard ordnance weights and measurements for the artillery, one of the earliest standards in the world.

The position of Master-General was frequently a cabinet-level one, especially in the late 18th and early 19th centuries, when it was normally a political appointment. In 1855 the post was discontinued and certain of the ceremonial aspects of the post were subsequently vested in the Commander-in-Chief of the Forces. In 1904, the post was re-established, and until 1938 the Master-General of the Ordnance was the Fourth Military Member of the Army Board.

In 1913, the control of military aviation was separated from the responsibilities of the Master-General of the Ordnance. A new Department of Military Aeronautics was established and Brigadier-General Henderson was appointed the first director.

In March 2013, the holder was titled as "Director Land Capability and Transformation" but still sat on the army board as Master-General of the Ordnance. In September 2013, the post was abolished.

== Masters of the Ordnance 1415–1544 ==
- Nicholas Merbury, 1415–1420
- John Hampton 1429
- William Gloucestre, 1435
- Gilbert Par, 1437
- Thomas Vaughan 1450
- John Judde 1456–1460 (murdered 1460)
- Philip Herveys c.1461
- Richard Guildford 1485–1494
- Robert Clifford 1495– (died 1508)
- Sir Sampson Norton 1511–1513
- Sir Henry Willoughby 1513
- Sir William Skeffington 1529–1535
- Bernardin de Valois (Bernadyne de Wallys) 1536
- Sir Christopher Morris 1537–1544

== Masters-General of the Ordnance, 1544–1855 ==
Source: Institute of Historical Research

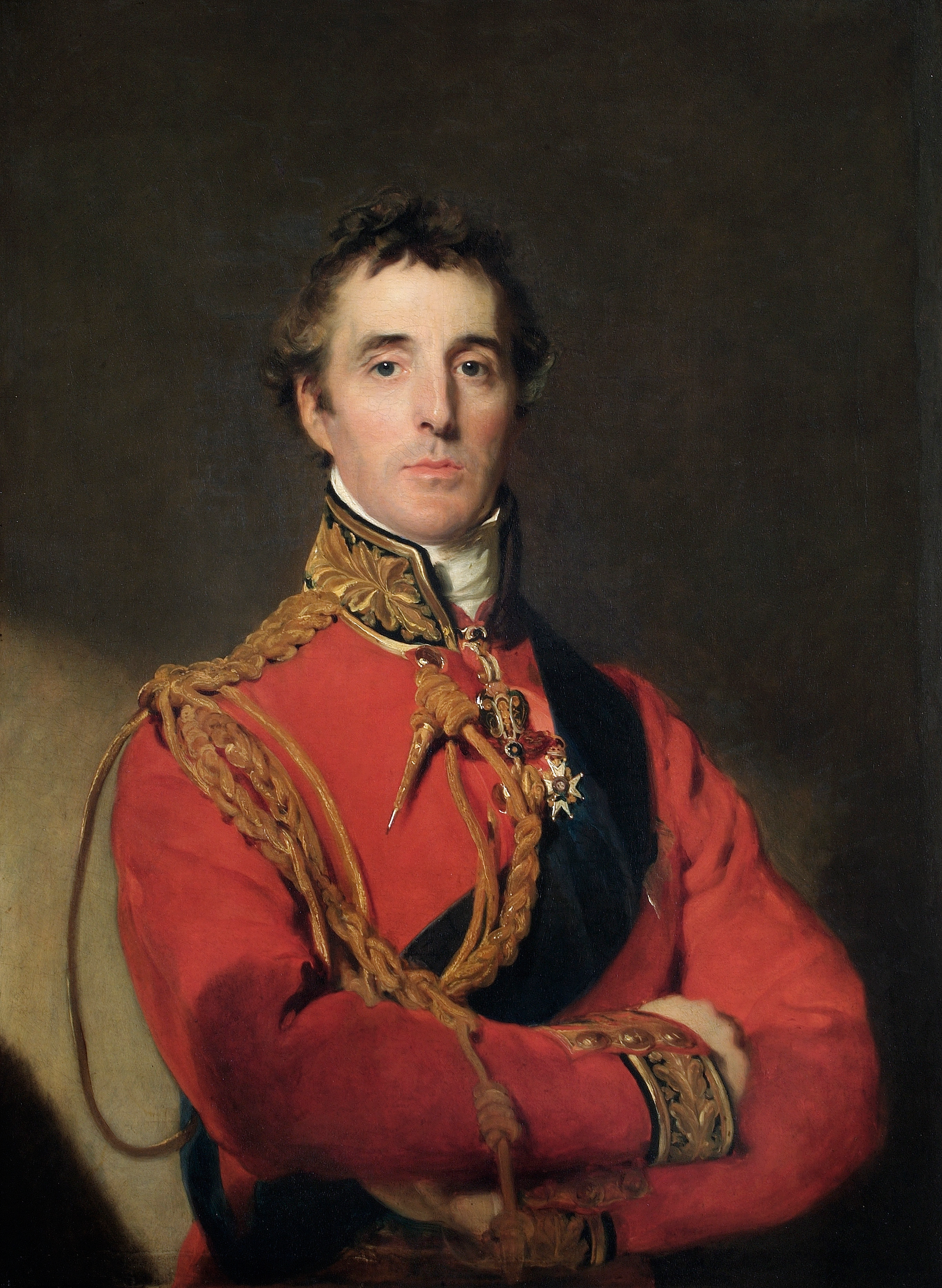
Portrait of the Duke of Wellington by Thomas Lawrence. Wellington held the post between 1819 and 1827.

- Sir Thomas Seymour 1544–1547
- Sir Philip Hoby 1547–1554
- Sir Richard Southwell 1554–1559
- Ambrose Dudley, 3rd Earl of Warwick 1560–1585
- Ambrose Dudley, 3rd Earl of Warwick jointly with Sir Philip Sidney 1585–1586
- Ambrose Dudley, 3rd Earl of Warwick 1586–1590
- Sir Henry Lee 1590–1597
- Robert Devereux, 2nd Earl of Essex 1597–1601
- vacant 1601–1603
- Charles Blount, 1st Earl of Devonshire 1603–1606
- vacant 1606–1608
- George Carew, 1st Lord Carew, 1st Earl of Totnes (1626) 1608–1629
- Horace Vere, 1st Lord Vere of Tilbury 1629–1634
- Mountjoy Blount, 1st Earl of Newport 1634–1661
- Sir William Compton 1661–1663
- in commission 1664–1670

William Berkeley, 1st Baron Berkeley
Sir John Duncombe
Thomas Chicheley

- Sir Thomas Chicheley 1670–1679
- in commission 1679–1682

Sir John Chicheley
Sir William Hickman, Bt.
Sir Christopher Musgrave, Bt

- George Legge, 1st Baron Dartmouth 1682–1688
- Frederick Schomberg, 1st Duke of Schomberg 1689–1690
- vacant 1690–1693
- Henry Sidney, 1st Earl of Romney 1693–1702
- John Churchill, 1st Duke of Marlborough 1702–1712
- Richard Savage, 4th Earl Rivers 1712
- James Hamilton, 4th Duke of Hamilton 1712
- vacant 1712–1714
- John Churchill, 1st Duke of Marlborough 1714–1722
- William Cadogan, 1st Earl Cadogan 1722–1725
- François de La Rochefoucauld, marquis de Montandre 1725
- John Campbell, 2nd Duke of Argyll 1725–1740
- John Montagu, 2nd Duke of Montagu 1740–1742
- John Campbell, 2nd Duke of Argyll 1742
- John Montagu, 2nd Duke of Montagu 1742–1749
- vacant 1749–1755
- Charles Spencer, 3rd Duke of Marlborough 1755–1758
- vacant 1758–1759
- John Ligonier, 1st Viscount Ligonier 1759–1763
- John Manners, Marquess of Granby 1763–1770
- vacant 1770–1772
- George Townshend, 4th Viscount Townshend 1772–1782
- Charles Lennox, 3rd Duke of Richmond 1782–1783
- George Townshend, 4th Viscount Townshend 1783–1784
- Charles Lennox, 3rd Duke of Richmond 1784–1795
- Charles Cornwallis, 1st Marquess Cornwallis 1795–1801
- John Pitt, 2nd Earl of Chatham 1801–1806
- Francis Rawdon Hastings, 2nd Earl of Moira 1806–1807
- John Pitt, 2nd Earl of Chatham 1807–1810
- Henry Phipps, 1st Earl of Mulgrave 1810–1819
- Arthur Wellesley, 1st Duke of Wellington 1819–1827
- Henry William Paget, 1st Marquess of Anglesey 1827–1828
- William Carr Beresford, 1st Viscount Beresford 1828–1830
- Sir James Kempt 1830–1834
- Sir George Murray 1834–1835
- Sir Richard Hussey Vivian, 1st Bt. 1835–1841
- Sir George Murray 1841–1846
- Henry William Paget, 1st Marquess of Anglesey 1846–1852
- Henry Hardinge, 1st Viscount Hardinge 1852
- Fitzroy James Henry Somerset, 1st Baron Raglan 1852–1855

== 1855–1894 ==
The post did not exist for the period 1855 to 1894.

== Inspector-General of the Ordnance 1895 to 1899 ==
In 1895 the post was revived, but re-styled Inspector-General.
Included:

- Lieutenant-General Sir Edwin Markham, April 1895 – December 1898

== Director-General of the Ordnance 1899 to 1904 ==
Included:

- General Sir Henry Brackenbury, February 1899 – February 1904

== Master-General of the Ordnance 1904 to 1938 ==
Holders of the post have included:

- Lieutenant-General Sir James Murray (1904–1907)
- Major-General Sir Charles Hadden (1907–1913)
- Major-General Sir Stanley von Donop (1913–1916)
- Lieutenant-General Sir William Furse (1916–1919)
- Lieutenant-General Sir John Du Cane (1920–1923)
- Lieutenant-General Sir Noel Birch (1923–1927)
- Lieutenant-General Sir Webb Gillman (1927–1931)
- Lieutenant-General Sir Ronald Charles (1931–1934)
- Lieutenant-General Sir Hugh Elles (1934–1938)

== 1939–1958 ==
The post was abolished by Leslie Hore-Belisha, the Secretary of State for War, as he perceived it to be a block on production, transferring tank development responsibility to the Director General of Munitions Development. It was not re-instated until 1959.

== Master-General of the Ordnance 1960 to 2013 ==
- Lieutenant-General Sir John Cowley (1960–1962)
- General Sir Cecil Sugden (1962–1963)
- Lieutenant-General Sir Charles Jones (1963–1966)
- Lieutenant-General Sir Charles Richardson (1966–1971)
- General Sir Noel Thomas (1971–1974)
- General Sir John Gibbon (1974–1977)
- General Sir Hugh Beach (1977–1981)
- General Sir Peter Leng (1981–1983)
- General Sir Richard Vincent (1983–1987)
- General Sir John Stibbon (1987–1991)
- General Sir Jeremy Blacker (1991–1995)
- Lieutenant-General Sir Robert Hayman-Joyce (1995–1998)
- Major-General David Jenkins (1998–2000)
- Major-General Peter Gilchrist (2000–2004)
- Major-General Andrew Figgures (2004–2006)
- Major-General Dick Applegate (June 2006 – November 2006)
- Major-General Chris Wilson (2006–2010)
- Major-General Bill Moore (2010–2011)

Post holders official dual title was: Director Land Capability and Transformation and Master-General of the Ordnance

- Major-General Nick Pope (2011–2013)
