= 27 Regiment RLC =

- Active: 1965–present
- Country: United Kingdom
- Branch: British Army
- Role: Logistics
- Size: Regiment; 744 personnel
- Part of: 101 Logistic Brigade
- Garrison/HQ: St Omer Barracks, Aldershot Garrison
- Engagements: Operation Grapple; Operation Banner; Operation Telic; Operation Herrick
- Website: 27 Regiment RLC

27 Regiment RLC is a regiment of the Royal Logistic Corps of the British Army.

== History ==
27 Transport Regiment, of the newly formed Royal Corps of Transport, was formed in 1965 as a maritime transport squadron. Upon the creation of the Royal Logistic Corps in 1993, 27 Transport Regiment was transferred without a change in title.

== Structure ==
The regiment's current structure is:

- 77 Headquarters Squadron
- 8 Fuel and General Transport Squadron
- 19 Tank Transporter Squadron
- 91 Supply Squadron
- 7 Fuel and General Transport Squadron
