= John Cooper (British Army officer) =

Former British Army officer (born 1955)

Lieutenant General John Cooper CB DSO MBE
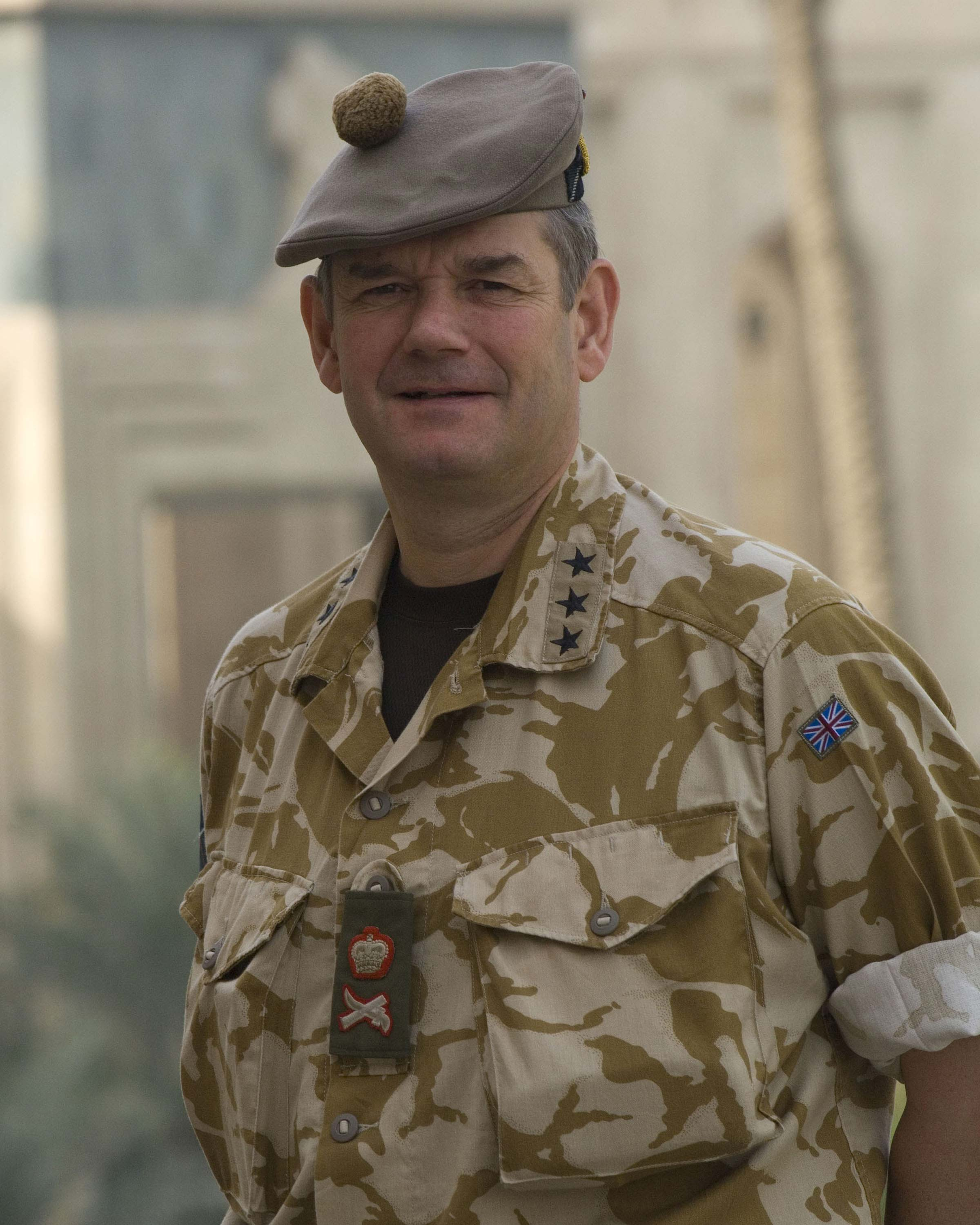
- Cooper in 2008
- Born: 17 February 1955 (age 71); Berwick-on-Tweed, England
- Military career
- Allegiance: United Kingdom
- Branch: British Army
- Service years: 1975–2009
- Rank: Lieutenant-general
- Service number: 499682
- Unit: King's Own Scottish Borderers
- Commands: Deputy Commander of Multinational Force-Iraq (2008–2009); 1st (UK) Armoured Division (2005–2006); 12th Mechanised Brigade (1999–2002); 1st Battalion, King's Own Scottish Borderers (1994–1997)
- Conflicts: Operation Banner; Gulf War; Bosnian War; Iraq War; War in Afghanistan
- Awards: Companion of the Order of the Bath; Distinguished Service Order; Member of the Order of the British Empire; Bronze Star Medal (United States)

Lieutenant-General John Cooper, CB, DSO, MBE (born 17 February 1955) is a former British Army officer. From March 2008 he was the Deputy Commander of Multinational Force-Iraq (MNF-I), the operational-level headquarters in Iraq, and the Senior British Military Representative-Iraq. As Deputy Commander, he was the principal assistant to General Raymond T. Odierno of the United States Army. He stepped down on 4 March 2009, and retired from the army later that year.

== Early life and career ==
Cooper was born on 17 February 1955 in Berwick-upon-Tweed. Educated at Berwick Grammar School, he then went to Royal Military College, Sandhurst, and was commissioned into the King's Own Scottish Borderers (KOSB) as a second lieutenant on 8 March 1975. He initially served in Northern Ireland, Britain and Germany, he was promoted lieutenant on 8 March 1977, and captain on 8 September 1981. In the early 1980s he served two tours with a British Army advisory and training team in Zimbabwe before attending Staff College, Camberley in 1987. He was promoted major on 30 September 1987, and after graduation from the staff course, he was appointed Chief of Staff, 8th Infantry Brigade in Northern Ireland 1988–89, for which he was appointed Member of the Order of the British Empire (MBE) on 6 November 1990. He then commanded a rifle company in 1st Battalion, KOSB (1KOSB), including active service in the Gulf War. He was promoted lieutenant colonel on 30 June 1994, and commanded 1KOSB for a further tour in Northern Ireland, for which he was appointed to the Distinguished Service Order (DSO), as well as tours in Edinburgh and Lancashire. He then served as an instructor at the Staff College, Camberley, and at the Joint Services Command and Staff College.

== Higher command ==
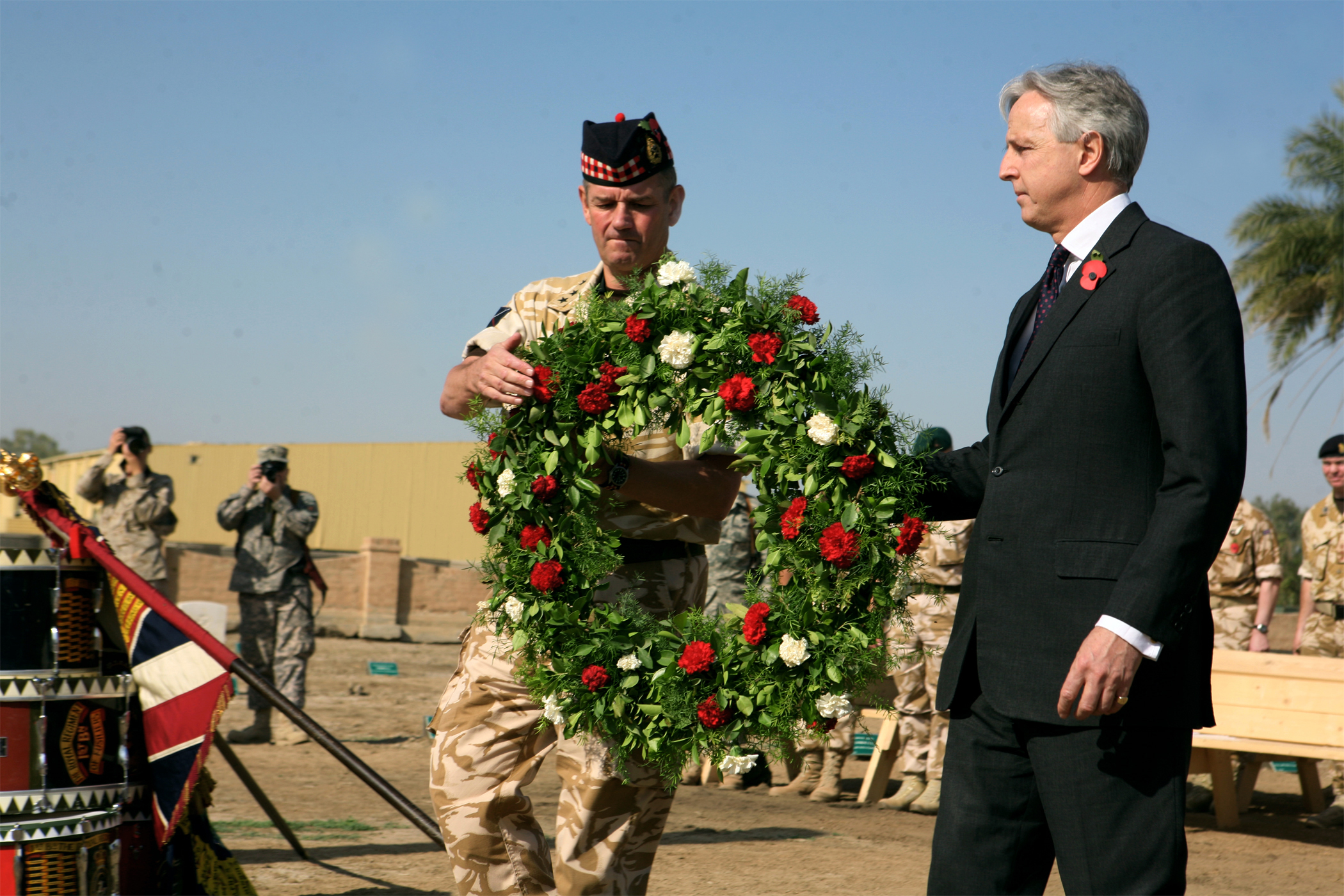
Cooper (centre) placing a wreath at a memorial marker during an Armistice Day rededication ceremony for the newly restored cemetery at RAF Habbaniya, 2008

In November 1997, Cooper was appointed to a high staff position as Deputy Assistant Chief of Staff, G3 (O&D) in HQ LAND, where he had responsibility for implementing recommendations arising from the Strategic Defence Review. He attended the Higher Command and Staff Course in 1998, and was promoted colonel on 30 June 1998. He was officially promoted to brigadier on 31 December 1999, with seniority from 30 June 1999, having taken command of the 12th Mechanised Brigade in November 1999. The brigade deployed to Bosnia in 2000. He was appointed to the honorary position of KOSB's Colonel of the Regiment on 9 February 2001 and held that post until the regiment was disbanded with its merger into the Royal Regiment of Scotland on 28 March 2006, when he became a Deputy Colonel of the new regiment. He was appointed the Chief of the Defence Staff's liaison officer to the Chairman of the Joint Chiefs of Staff in the Pentagon (United States) in Washington DC in 2002. He then assumed the appointment of Chief of Staff, Field Army, HQ Land Command.

Upon promotion to major general on 7 May 2004, Cooper became Deputy Commander Combined Forces Command (Afghanistan) until December 2004. He was awarded the US Bronze Star Medal for his service in Afghanistan. When he departed Afghanistan, he took command of 1st (UK) Armoured Division on 25 January 2005, taking elements of that division to Iraq where it formed HQ Multi-National Division (South-East). He returned to England for two years of senior leadership positions before his promotion to lieutenant general and return to Iraq on 23 March 2008 to become Senior British Military Representative and Deputy Commanding General, Multinational Force, Iraq. He stepped down from the post on 4 March 2009. In an interview on 3 March 2009 he expressed his belief that the struggle against Al Qaida in Iraq had been won, and that the country was getting back on its feet.

Cooper was appointed Companion of the Order of the Bath (CB) in the 2009 Birthday Honours. He retired from the army on 21 November 2009.

Military offices
New post	Deputy Commander, Combined Forces Command (Afghanistan); 2004	Succeeded by Peter Gilchrist
Preceded by Peter Wall	General Officer Commanding 1st (UK) Armoured Division; 2005–2006	Succeeded by Graham Binns
Preceded by James Dutton	General Officer Commanding; Multi-National Division (South East), Iraq; 2005–2006	Succeeded by Richard Shirreff
Preceded by Bill Rollo	Senior British Military Representative and Deputy Commanding General, Multinational Force, Iraq; 2008–2009	Succeeded by Chris Brown
