= George Fead =

George Fead (1729?–1815), was a lieutenant-general and colonel-commandant fourth battalion Royal Artillery. He spent 30 years of his military service on foreign postings.

== Career ==
Fead entered the Royal Military Academy, Woolwich, as a cadet 1 September 1756, became a lieutenant-fireworker Royal Artillery on 8 June 1756. As a lieutenant-fireworker he was present at the Siege of Louisburg, Cape Breton, in 1758 during the Seven Years' War. He was afterwards taken prisoner at Newfoundland, but exchanged. He returned to America, where he remained for six or seven years, part of the time at Pensacola. He became second lieutenant in 1760, first lieutenant in 1764, and captain-lieutenant in 1771.

He served in Menorca from 1774 to 1781, becoming a captain in 1779, and commanded the artillery during the defence of Fort St. Philip from August 1780 to February 1781, during which he lost an eye by the bursting of a shell. He was one of the witnesses on the trial of Lieutenant-general James Murray, the governor, on charges preferred by Sir William Draper. He became a brevet major in 1783, and went to Newfoundland a second time in 1790. He became a regimental major in 1792 and lieutenant-colonel in 1793, and in 1794 served under the Duke of York in the Flanders Campaign. He became a brevet colonel in 1797 and a regimental colonel in 1799, going to Jamaica in 1799 to command the artillery there for many years. He became a major-general in 1803, and was made lieutenant-general and lieutenant-governor of Port Royal in 1810.

Fead died at his home on Woolwich Common on 20 November 1815, aged 85. He had nine sons in the armed forces, several of whom were killed or died on duty abroad.
