= Dalton Barracks =

Army barracks in Oxfordshire, England

- Abingdon
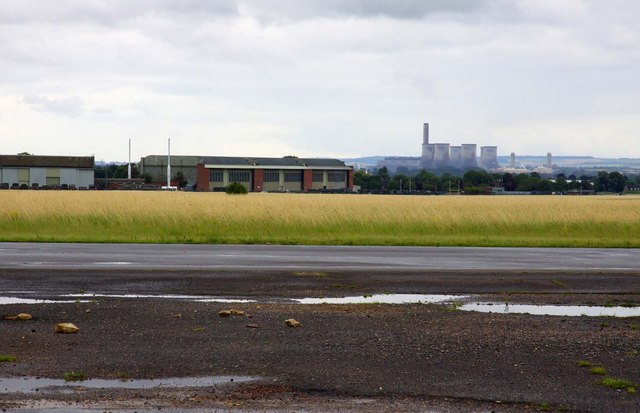
- Dalton Barracks

Site information
- Type: Barracks
- Owner: Ministry of Defence
- Operator: British Army

Location
- Location within Oxfordshire
- Coordinates: 51°41′27″N 01°19′00″W

Site history
- Built: 1992
- In use: 1992–Present

Garrison information
- Occupants: Royal Logistic Corps; Intelligence Corps

Dalton Barracks is a military installation near Abingdon in Oxfordshire, England and home to 4 Regiment Royal Logistic Corps.

== History ==
The barracks were established, on the site of the former RAF Abingdon airbase, in 1992: they were named after James Dalton VC, who earned his VC as an acting assistant commissary in the Commissariat and Transport Department at the Battle of Rorke's Drift. The barracks were initially occupied by 3 and 4 Close Support Regiments of the Royal Corps of Transport (now 3 and 4 Regiments of the Royal Logistic Corps).

The primary occupier of the barracks is now 4 Regiment RLC, after 3 Regiment was disbanded as part of the Future Soldier reforms.

== Based units ==
The following units are based at Dalton Barracks.

- 4 Regiment, Royal Logistic Corps
  - 75 Headquarters Squadron
  - 4 Close Support Squadron
  - 33 General Support Squadron
  - 60 Close Support Squadron
  - REME Light Aid Detachment (LAD)
- 21 MI Company, 2 MI Battalion, Intelligence Corps
- Thames Valley Wing RAFAC

== Future ==
In March 2013, the Ministry of Defence announced that 12 Logistic Support Regiment would be disbanded with the loss of 400 jobs on the site. In November 2016, the MoD announced that the site would close completely in 2029, this was later extended to 2031.

In 2021, it was reported that the site was being used to film Masters of the Air, an upcoming television series from Tom Hanks and Steven Spielberg.
