= Christopher Wilson (British Army officer) =

Major General Chris Wilson CB CBE
- Military career
- Allegiance: United Kingdom
- Branch: British Army
- Service years: 1973–2010
- Rank: Major General
- Awards: Companion of the Order of the Bath; Commander of the Order of the British Empire
- Other work: Colonel Commandant, Royal Artillery

Major General Christopher Colin Wilson CB CBE is a former British Army officer who became Director of Battlefield Manoeuvre and Master-General of the Ordnance.

== Military career ==
Wilson was commissioned into the Royal Artillery in 1973. He was appointed the Senior Army Representative at the Royal College of Defence Studies in 2005. He was deployed as Deputy Commander, Combined Forces Command in Afghanistan in 2006 and became Director of Battlefield Manoeuvre and Master-General of the Ordnance in 2006 before retiring in May 2010.

He was also Colonel Commandant of the Royal Artillery.

Military offices
Preceded by Peter Gilchrist	Deputy Commander, Combined Forces Command (Afghanistan); 2006	Succeeded by Post disbanded
Preceded by Dick Applegate	Master-General of the Ordnance; 2006–2010	Succeeded by Bill Moore
