= 4 Regiment RLC =

4 Close Support Logistic Regiment
- Active: 1965 - present
- Country: United Kingdom
- Branch: British Army
- Role: Close Support Logistics
- Size: Regiment; 545 personnel
- Part of: 12th Armoured Brigade Combat Team
- Garrison/HQ: Dalton Barracks, Abingdon
- Engagements: War in Afghanistan
- Website: 4 Regiment RLC

4 Regiment RLC is a regiment of the British Army's Royal Logistic Corps.

== History ==
The regiment was formed before World War I and was titled as 4th Regiment, Royal Logistic Corps. From 1993 to 1994, the regiment was involved in Operation Grapple 3 in Bosnia and Herzegovina. From 2003 to 2004, the regiment was on operations in Iraq on Operation Telic. In 2005, it was renamed as 4 Logistic Support Regiment. In 2018, the regiment supported operations in Ukraine and Estonia. It also provided support at home during the COVID-19 pandemic in the United Kingdom.

== Structure ==
The current regimental structure is as follows:

- 75 Headquarters Squadron
- 4 Close Support Squadron
- 33 General Support Squadron
- 60 Close Support Squadron
- Royal Electrical and Mechanical Engineers Light Aid Detachment
