= 12th Armoured Brigade (United Kingdom) =

British Army formation

- Insignia of 12th Mechanized Brigade
- Active: 1899 – present
- Country: United Kingdom
- Branch: British Army
- Type: Mechanized infantry
- Part of: 3rd (United Kingdom) Division
- Garrison/HQ: Bulford Camp
- Engagements: Second Boer War; First World War; Le Cateau; Battle of Marne; Battle of Aisne; First Battle of Ypres (1914); Battle of Messines (1914); Hill 60; Second Battle of Ypres (1915); Battle of Albert; Battle of Le Transloy; Battle of the Somme; First Battle of the Scarpe; Third Battle of the Scarpe; Battle of Polygon Wood; Battle of Broodseinde; Battle of Poelcapelle; Battle of Passchendaele; Battle of Arras (1918); Battle of Hazebroucke; Battle of Bethune; Advance in Flanders; Battle of the Scarpe (1918); Battle of Drocourt-Quéant; Battle of the Canal du Nord; Battle of the Selle; Battle of Valenciennes; Second World War

Commanders
- Current commander: Brigadier Henry Searby
- Notable commanders: R.A.P. Clements; Sir Henry Maitland Wilson; Sir Adrian Carton de Wiart; Sir John Hawkesworth; Daniel Beak; Sir Richard Hull; Sir Gordon MacMillan

Insignia
NATO Map Symbol
12
3

The 12th Armoured Brigade, formerly the 12th Armoured Infantry Brigade, is a regular brigade of the British Army which has existed almost continuously since 1899 and now forms part of the 3rd (United Kingdom) Division.

== History ==
=== Second Boer War ===
British Army brigades had traditionally been ad hoc formations known by the name of their commander or numbered as part of a division. However, units involved in the Second Boer War in 1899 were organised into sequentially numbered brigades frequently reassigned between divisions. 6th Division, consisting of the 12th and 13th Brigades, was formed on 30 November and landed in South Africa during January 1900. It was moved up to Nauwpoort, where the 12th Brigade under the command of Major-General R.A.P. Clements was pushed forward to reinforce the Cavalry Division. When the field force was reorganised after the capture of Bloemfontein, the 12th Brigade returned to the command of the 6th Division. The brigade saw action at the Battle of Rensburg, Battle of Norval's Point, Battle of Biddulph's Berg and Battle of Slabbert's Nek.

However, after the defeat of the main Boer field armies and the development of guerrilla warfare, all the divisions and brigades were broken up to form ad hoc 'columns' and garrisons. Battalions were detached from 12th Bde during operations in the Brandwater Basin in July 1900, and Maj-Gen Clements had detachments of Mounted infantry and Imperial Yeomanry attached to his command. By the end of the year, Clements was an important column commander, but none of his units came from his original 12th Brigade.

==== Order of Battle ====
The 12th Brigade was originally constituted as follows:

- 2nd Battalion, Bedfordshire Regiment
- 1st Battalion, Royal Irish Regiment
- 2nd Battalion, Worcestershire Regiment
- 2nd Battalion, Wiltshire Regiment

After the Boer War, the 12th Brigade became a permanent headquarters in 1902, stationed with the 6th Division at Plymouth. By 1907, it was still part of the 6th Division, but now stationed at Colchester in Eastern Command. In the Expeditionary Force established by the Haldane reforms, the 12th Brigade at Colchester and later at Dover became part of the 4th Division. It remained so until the outbreak of World War I.

=== First World War ===
During the First World War, the 12th Brigade, a regular army formation, was assigned to the 4th Infantry Division. It was dispatched to France, crossing the English Channel on 22 August 1914, as part of the British Expeditionary Force (BEF) and saw action in the First Battle of the Marne beginning in September 1914. It then spent much of the remaining conflict engaged in trench warfare.

==== Order of battle ====
The 12th Brigade was constituted as follows during the war:

- 1st Battalion, King's Own (Royal Lancaster Regiment)
- 2nd Battalion, Lancashire Fusiliers
- 2nd Battalion, Essex Regiment
- 2nd Battalion, Duke of Wellington's (West Riding Regiment) (from January 1916 to 10th Brigade, February 1918)
- 2nd Battalion, Royal Irish Regiment (from March 1915 to 11th Brigade, July 1915)
- 1/5th Battalion, South Lancashire Regiment (from February 1915 until January 1916)
- 1/2nd Battalion, Monmouthshire Regiment (until January 1916)

From early November 1915 until February 1916, the 12th Brigade was swapped with the 107th (Ulster) Brigade of the 36th (Ulster) Division.

=== Second World War ===
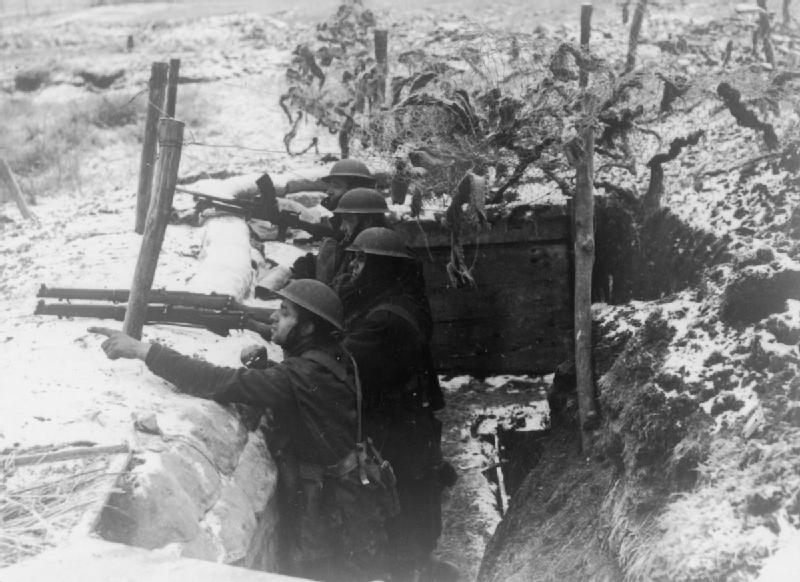
Men of the 2nd Battalion, Royal Fusiliers in a trench in front of the Maginot Line, 3 January 1940.

During the Second World War, except for a few brief periods of detachment, the brigade formed part of the 4th Infantry Division, as in the First World War. It was part of the British Expeditionary Force (BEF) and took part in the Battle of France and the subsequent Dunkirk evacuation in May–June 1940.

The brigade remained in the United Kingdom for the next two years, preparing and training to repel Operation Sea Lion, the German invasion of England, although that never arrived. It moved to North Africa in February 1943 to participate in the Tunisian Campaign's later stages, where it saw action at the Battle of Oved Zara, the Battle of Medjez Plain and the Battle of Tunis. It then took part in the Italian Campaign, moving to Naples in February 1944 and saw further action at the Fourth Battle of Monte Cassino. By October 1944, the 4th Division was taking part in the British Eighth Army's battle on the Gothic Line. Still, it was withdrawn in November to spend the rest of the war in Greece, part of the Allied force tasked to prevent civil unrest as rival factions attempted to fill the political vacuum when the Germans withdrew from the country.

==== Order of battle ====
The 12th Infantry Brigade was constituted as follows during the war:

- 2nd Battalion, Royal Fusiliers
- 1st Battalion, South Lancashire Regiment (until June 1940)
- 1st Battalion, Black Watch (until March 1940)
- 12th Infantry Brigade Anti-Tank Company (left to join 4th Battalion, Reconnaissance Corps, 1 January 1941)
- 6th Battalion, Black Watch (from March 1940)
- 1st Battalion, Queen's Own Royal West Kent Regiment (from September 1940)

=== Post-1945 ===
The brigade was disbanded in March 1947, but reformed as the 91st Lorried Infantry Brigade in April 1956. During the 1970s, it was one of two "square" brigades assigned to the 2nd Armoured Division. After being briefly converted to "Task Force Delta" in the late 1970s, the brigade was reinstated in 1981 as 12th Armoured Brigade, assigned to 1st Armoured Division and based at Quebec Barracks at Osnabrück. It remained with the 1st Armoured Division, apart from a spell under HQ 3rd Armoured Division during Operation Granby, until disbandment under Options for Change. Following the Strategic Defence Review in 1998, the brigade was reformed as a mechanized unit under the 3rd Mechanised Division at Aldershot Garrison; it relocated to Ward Barracks in Bulford Camp in February 2004.

== Future ==
Under the Future Soldier programme, the brigade has been redesignated as the 12th Armoured Brigade. In the future, it will control a reconnaissance regiment (KRH) equipped with the General Dynamics Ajax. The current armoured regiment (RTR) will be re-equipped with the Challenger 3 MBT, and the armoured infantry battalions with the Warrior IFV will be re-equipped with the Boxer AFV.

== Organisation ==
The current organisation of the brigade under the Defence in a Competitive Age is:

- 12th Armoured Infantry Brigade Headquarters, at Bulford Barracks, Bulford Garrison
- Royal Tank Regiment, at Aliwal Barracks, Tidworth
- King's Royal Hussars, at Aliwal Barracks, Tidworth Garrison
- The Royal Wessex Yeomanry (Army Reserve)
- 1st Battalion, Royal Welsh, at Lucknow Barracks, Tidworth Garrison (Armoured Infantry)
- 1st Battalion, Mercian Regiment, at Picton Barracks, Bulford Garrison (Armoured Infantry)
- 3rd Battalion, The Rifles
- 3rd Battalion, Royal Welsh, Battalion HQ in Cardiff, Wales (Army Reserve – Armoured Infantry, paired with 1 R WELSH)
- 4th Battalion, Mercian Regiment, Battalion HQ in Wolverhampton, West Midlands (Army Reserve – Armoured Infantry, paired with 1 MERCIAN)
- 4 Regiment, Royal Logistic Corps, at Dalton Barracks, Abingdon
- 4 Battalion, Royal Electrical and Mechanical Engineers
- 15th Signal Regiment
- 19th Regiment Royal Artillery
- 26 Engineer Regiment

== Brigade Commanders ==
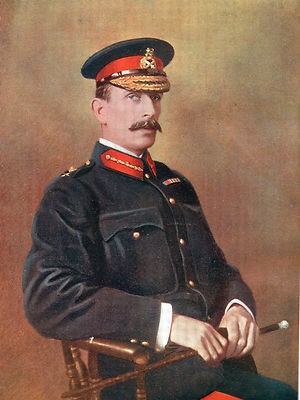
Maj-Gen R.A.P. Clements, the brigade's first commander.

Brigade commanders have included:

- Major-General R.A.P. Clements: 1899–1900
- Brigadier-General Charles E. Bradley: 22 July 1905–July 1909
- Brigadier-General Francis S. Inglefield: July 1909 – June 1912
- Brigadier-General Henry F.M. Wilson: June 1912 – September 1914
- Lieutenant-Colonel Frederick G. Anley: September 1914 (acting)
- Brigadier-General Henry F. M. Wilson: September – October 1914
- Brigadier-General Frederick G. Anley: October 1914 – June 1916
- Brigadier-General James D. Crosbie: June 1916 – January 1917
- Brigadier-General Adrian Carton de Wiart: January – November 1917
- Lieutenant-Colonel H. W. Glenn: November 1917 (acting)
- Brigadier-General Edward A. Fagan: November 1917 – October 1918
- Brigadier-General E.B. Macnaghten: October 1918 – 1919
- Brigadier-General Arthur H. Marindin: November 1919 – November 1923
- Brigadier-General Neville J.G. Cameron: November 1923 – October 1925
- Brigadier-General Edward B. Hankey: October 1925 – October 1929
- Brigadier Sir Hereward Wake, Bt.: October 1929 – August 1932
- Brigadier Charles A. Howard: August 1932 – July 1935
- Brigadier Martin Kemp-Welsh: July 1935 – August 1936
- Brigadier the Hon. P. Gerald Scarlett: August 1936 – September 1938
- Brigadier John G.W. Clark: September 1938 – October 1939
- Brigadier John L.I. Hawkesworth: October 1939 – June 1940
- Brigadier Daniel M.W. Beak: June 1940 – December 1941
- Brigadier Robert G.W. Callaghan: December 1941 – April 1943
- Brigadier Richard A. Hull: April–June 1943
- Brigadier Gordon H.A. MacMillan: June 1943
- Brigadier Thomas P.D. Scott: July–November 1943
- Brigadier F.M. Elliott: November 1943 – April 1944
- Brigadier Algernon G.W. Heber-Percy: April 1944–
- Brigadier Cyril E.H. Dolphin: 1949–1950
- Brigadier Frederick Stephens: -December 1950
- Brigadier Victor D.G. Campbell: December 1950 – November 1952
- Brigadier John F.M. Macdonald: November 1952 – 1954
- Brigadier Alfred (John) Tilly: 1954–1955
- Brigadier Ian H. Freeland: April 1956 – November 1957
- Brigadier Patrick H. Man: 1959 – March 1962
- Brigadier Philip T. Tower: March 1962 – 1964
- Brigadier Walter B. Thomas: 1964–1966
- Brigadier H. Mark G. Bond: 1966 – December 1968
- Brigadier W.G. Hugh Beach: December 1968 – September 1970
- Brigadier David T. Young: September 1970 – September 1972
- Brigadier Walter R. Taylor: September 1972 – December 1974
- Brigadier Michael F. Reynolds: December 1974 – December 1976
- Brigadier John C.O.R. Hopkinson: December 1976 – December 1978
- Brigadier Brian L.G. Kenny: December 1978 – December 1980
- Brigadier Charles A. Ramsay: December 1980 – December 1982
- Brigadier Peter R. Davies: December 1982 – November 1984
- Brigadier Jeremy J.G. Mackenzie: November 1984 – 1986
- Brigadier G. Hyde: 1986 – December 1988
- Brigadier Jonathan M.F.C. Hall: December 1988 – November 1990
- Brigadier Timothy J. Granville-Chapman: November 1990 – January 1993
- Brigadier John Cooper: November 1999 – January 2002
- Brigadier the Hon. Jonathan D. Shaw: January 2002 – April 2003
- Brigadier Christopher G.S. Hughes: April 2003 – June 2005
- Brigadier John G. Lorimer: June 2005 – November 2007
- Brigadier David M. Cullen: November 2007 – December 2009
- Brigadier Justin C.W. Maciejewski: December 2009 – September 2011
- Brigadier Douglas M. Chalmers: September 2011 – September 2013
- Brigadier C. Roland V. Walker: October 2013 – July 2015
- Brigadier Robin C.N. Sergeant: July 2015–
- Brigadier Henry Searby 2023–2025

== Sources ==
- L.S. Amery (ed), The Times History of the War in South Africa 1899-1902, London: Sampson Low, Marston, 7 Vols 1900–09.
- Maj A.F. Becke,History of the Great War: Order of Battle of Divisions, Part 1: The Regular British Divisions, London: HM Stationery Office, 1934/Uckfield: Naval & Military Press, 2007, ISBN 1-847347-38-X.
- Col John K. Dunlop, The Development of the British Army 1899–1914, London: Methuen, 1938.
- Lt-Col H.F. Joslen, Orders of Battle, United Kingdom and Colonial Formations and Units in the Second World War, 1939–1945, London: HM Stationery Office, 1960/London: London Stamp Exchange, 1990, ISBN 0-948130-03-2/Uckfield: Naval & Military Press, 2003, ISBN 1-843424-74-6.
- Watson, Graham (2005). The British Army in Germany: An Organizational History 1947–2004. Tiger Lily. ISBN 978-0972029698.

=== External links ===
- Chris Baker, The Long, Long Trail
- 12th Armoured Infantry Brigade
- British Army 1939
