= Peter Gilchrist (British Army officer) =

British Army general

Major General Peter Gilchrist CB
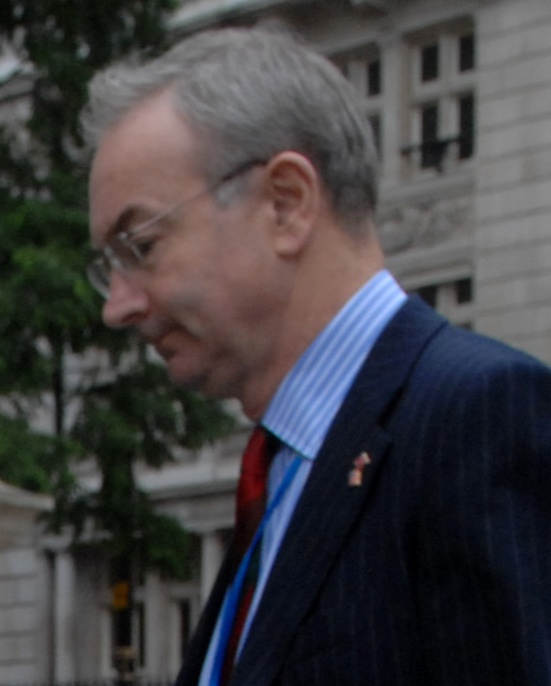
- Gilchrist in 2008
- Born: 28 February 1952 (age 74)
- Military career
- Allegiance: United Kingdom
- Branch: British Army
- Service years: 1973–2009
- Rank: Major General
- Service number: 499420
- Commands: 1st Royal Tank Regiment
- Conflicts: War in Afghanistan
- Awards: Companion of the Order of the Bath; Bronze Star Medal (United States)

Major General Peter Gilchrist, CB (born 28 February 1952) is a retired senior British Army officer who served as Master-General of the Ordnance from 2000 to 2004.

== Military career ==
Educated at Marlborough College, Gilchrist was commissioned into the Royal Tank Regiment in 1973. He became commanding officer of the 1st Royal Tank Regiment in 1993, Deputy Director of Ordnance in 1996 and Programme Director for Armoured Systems in 1998. He went on to be an executive director at the Defence Procurement Agency and Master-General of the Ordnance in 2000. He was deployed to Afghanistan as Deputy Commander at Combined Forces Command in 2004, and then became Head of the British Defence Staff and Defence Attaché in Washington, D.C. in 2006. He retired in 2009.

Military offices
Preceded by David Jenkins	Master-General of the Ordnance; 2000–2004	Succeeded by Andrew Figgures
Preceded by John Cooper	Deputy Commander, Combined Forces Command (Afghanistan); 2004–2005	Succeeded by Chris Wilson
Preceded by Anthony Dymock	Head of the British Defence Staff in Washington, D.C. 2005–2008	Succeeded by Michael Harwood
