= Sunda Straits Crisis =

1964 diplomatic incident in Indonesia

- Part of the Indonesia–Malaysia confrontation
- The Sunda Strait separating Java and Sumatra was the center of the Crisis.
Date	27 August – 10 September 1964
Location	Sunda Strait, Indonesia
Result	See Aftermath

Belligerents
United Kingdom	Indonesia

Commanders and leaders
Alec Douglas-Home; (United Kingdom) Peter Thorneycroft; (United Kingdom) Earl Mountbatten of Burma; (United Kingdom) Varyl Begg	(Indonesia) Sukarno; (Indonesia) Subandrio; (Indonesia) Suwito

Strength
1 aircraft carrier 3 destroyers 2 frigates	full strength of the Indonesian Air Force number of light surface vessels and submarines

The Sunda Straits Crisis was a two-week confrontation between the United Kingdom and Indonesia over the passage of the Illustrious-class aircraft carrier HMS Victorious through the Sunda Strait, a major waterway separating the Indonesian islands of Java and Sumatra, occurring between August and September 1964. The incident was part of the larger Indonesia-Malaysia confrontation, an armed conflict between Indonesia and Malaysia (with the military support of Britain) over the formation of the latter as an independent state.

On 27 August 1964, the British aircraft carrier HMS Victorious and her two destroyer escorts sailed through the Sunda Strait, an international waterway claimed by Indonesia, en route to Australia. Upset by the casual warning the British had given of the ships' impending passage through the Strait (a telephone call made two days before, which did not mention the carrier) and wary of the possibility that the British were attempting to provoke a violent response, the Indonesian Ministry of Foreign Affairs decided two days later to prohibit the warships from making the return journey to Singapore, scheduled for the middle of September.

Infuriated by what was perceived as another affront to British prestige after the recent landings at Pontian and Labis by Indonesian volunteers in southwestern Malaysia, members of the British Cabinet, particularly Peter Thorneycroft and Louis Mountbatten, favoured sending the carrier back through the Strait in spite of the Indonesian ban. Though British naval commanders in the Far East had grave concerns that the Victorious would be indefensible while in passage, the prevailing opinion was that not to send the ship would result in an immense political defeat on both a domestic and international scale as well as the loss of rights to an important waterway. Tension mounted as the British and Indonesians each refused to bend, and as the carrier's time to sail came, war became increasingly likely.

On 10 September, however, the Indonesians proposed a way out: an alternative route through the Lombok Strait. The British took them up on this offer, to the relief of both parties, and the Victorious made a peaceful return through Indonesian territory. War was averted, and the climax of tensions during the confrontation had been passed. Never again was the threat of all-out war a realistic possibility, despite some large land battles in northern Borneo the following spring, and the confrontation wound down by late fall of 1965. It had never escalated into a major conflict, and a peace deal was signed the following year.

== Origins ==
On 31 August 1957, the British territory of Malaya received its independence from the Crown as a part of Britain's colonial withdrawal from the Far East, after nearly a decade of tortuous counter-insurgency warfare by British and Commonwealth troops against Malayan rebels in the Malayan Emergency. British plans dictated that the new state would be federated with the British colonies of Sarawak, Sabah, and Brunei in northern Borneo in order to better protect British military and economic interests in those regions. Brunei did not join, but Sarawak, Sabah, and Singapore had all agreed to join the new Federation by 1963. This project, labeled the 'Grand Design' by politician Malcolm MacDonald in the 1950s, became the cornerstone of British strategic thinking concerning Southeast Asia, and led to the initial federation of the numerous Malayan states in spite of their various differences, with Singapore and the Borneo states joining later. This plan also earned the support of the Malaysian government, which hoped to forestall claims from Indonesia on Borneo.

=== Beginnings of the confrontation ===
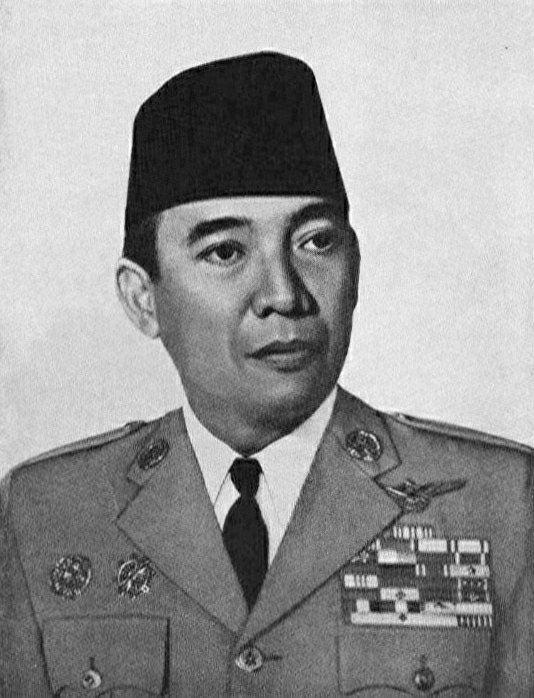
President Sukarno of Indonesia was a driving force behind Konfrontasi.

Indonesia, meanwhile, and especially her longtime president Sukarno, was vehemently opposed to the creation of the Federation. Sukarno opposed both the preservation of the 'imperialist' British presence in Southeast Asia, a region in which he aspired to be the supreme power, and the incorporating of the Borneo colonies into the new Federation, as his goal was to control the entire island. Indeed, through possession of the Kalimantan region, Indonesia already controlled the vast majority of Borneo. To improve Indonesia's position at the negotiating table before the Federation was created, Sukarno initiated a period of Konfrontasi (confrontation) with Malaysia. Consisting initially of frequent raids by Indonesian 'volunteers' into Malaysian territory, the conflict was not considered a war by either side, least of all by the Indonesians. When questioned on what the confrontation was, Foreign Minister Subandrio of Indonesia replied, "Confrontation does not include war, because it can be carried on without war."

To Sukarno, this sort of operation had a number of merits. Starting a military operation against 'imperialists' would help to bind together the antagonistic forces of the army and the Communist Party (PKI) in supporting him, while not creating a fully conflict would prevent the militarily superior British and their Commonwealth allies from using their full force. Indonesia had also pulled off a successful operation using similar techniques in the West Irian campaign against the Dutch a decade prior, a raiding campaign into Western New Guinea had ended with the Dutch ceding that territory to prevent Indonesia from 'falling' to Communism.

=== The confrontation expands ===
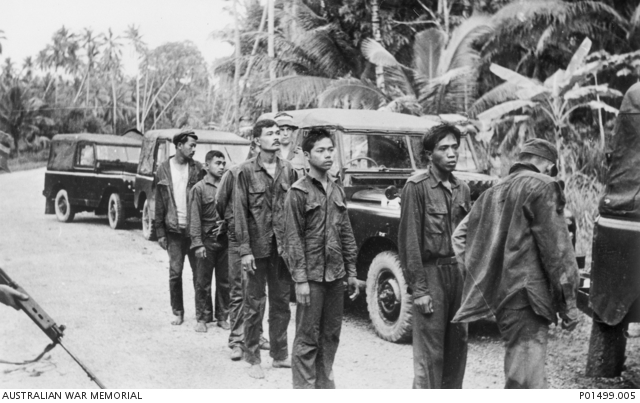
Indonesian troops captured after a raid at Kesang River on the Malay Peninsula.

The main part of the confrontation is generally split into three distinct phases. In the first, Indonesia supported revolts against Anglo-Malaysian rule in northern Borneo, most notably the Brunei Revolt in December 1962. In the second, the guerrilla raids began in earnest, from April 1963 onwards. The fighting in this phase, while causing some damage and casualties, was relatively minor and the incursions were usually only made up of platoon sized bands crossing the Kalimantan border into Sarawak and Sabah. These operations were the essence of the initial strategy to improve the Indonesian negotiating position and continued alongside said negotiations throughout the summer of 1963. However, on 16 September, the negotiations concluded with the formation of the Malaysian Federation, which included Malaya, Singapore, and the two Borneo states (Sarawak and Sabah). In response, the raids were intensified into larger groups working with or consisting of Indonesian regular troops. This was the beginning of the escalation of the conflict into its third and most dangerous phase.

However, that phase was a year in coming. After spending most of 1964 engaged in northern Borneo and becoming ever more frustrated with Britain's opposition to his plans, Sukarno delivered a speech in Jakarta on 17 August for Independence Day. In it, he railed against the Western powers, particularly Britain and America, for their policies in Vietnam and Malaysia. He declared that the following year would be a "year of living dangerously" for Indonesia. This speech, which came a week after Sukarno acknowledged North Vietnam's statehood, became a signal of intent, and Sukarno meant to back his words up with action. That night, a small contingent of Indonesian soldiers landed at Pontian, in the state of Johor on the southern tip of the Malay Peninsula. Though the raiders were quickly apprehended by elite Malaysian security forces of the Senoi Praaq, it was clear to all parties that the confrontation was rapidly expanding. A threatened Malaysia declared a state of emergency and put pressure on the British to act in their defense.

== Crisis ==
=== Victorious sails from Singapore ===
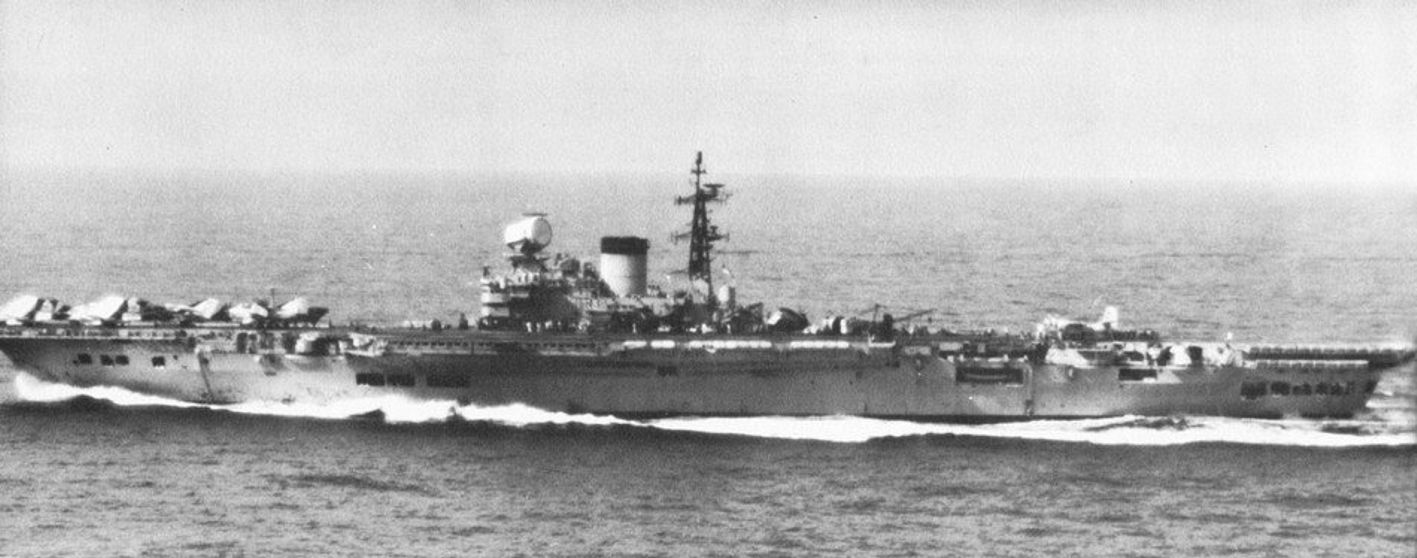
HMS Victorious underway in the Pacific in 1964.

On 26 August, the aircraft carrier HMS Victorious sailed from Singapore with her two escorting destroyers, HMS Caesar and HMS Cavendish, bound for Fremantle in Western Australia. The purpose of the voyage is still disputed, but it is probable that the carrier group was passing through as a show of strength to Indonesia in the wake of the Pontian landings as well as the routine 'goodwill visit' that the vessel was purportedly making to Britain's ally. The task force was surprisingly met by very little Indonesian response as it passed through their territorial waters, the carrier reporting only a single Tupolev Tu-16 aircraft making a flyover as the warships passed through the Sunda Strait the following day. The ownership of the Strait itself was complex, as Indonesia claimed it despite British assertions that it was an international waterway that her warships could pass through at any time. Following standard British procedure in such a situation, the British Military Attache in Jakarta had telephoned ahead to the Indonesian Director of Naval Intelligence that the squadron would be passing through Indonesian territory without seeking their clearance, a precedent set the last time Britain had used the Straits in October 1963. This policy, engineered by the Foreign Office, had the dual purpose of notifying the Indonesians of a possibly provocative action without recognizing what they thought to be exaggerated claims on international waters. The return date to Singapore was not set exactly at the time of sailing but was to be sometime in mid-September.

=== Initial Indonesian response ===
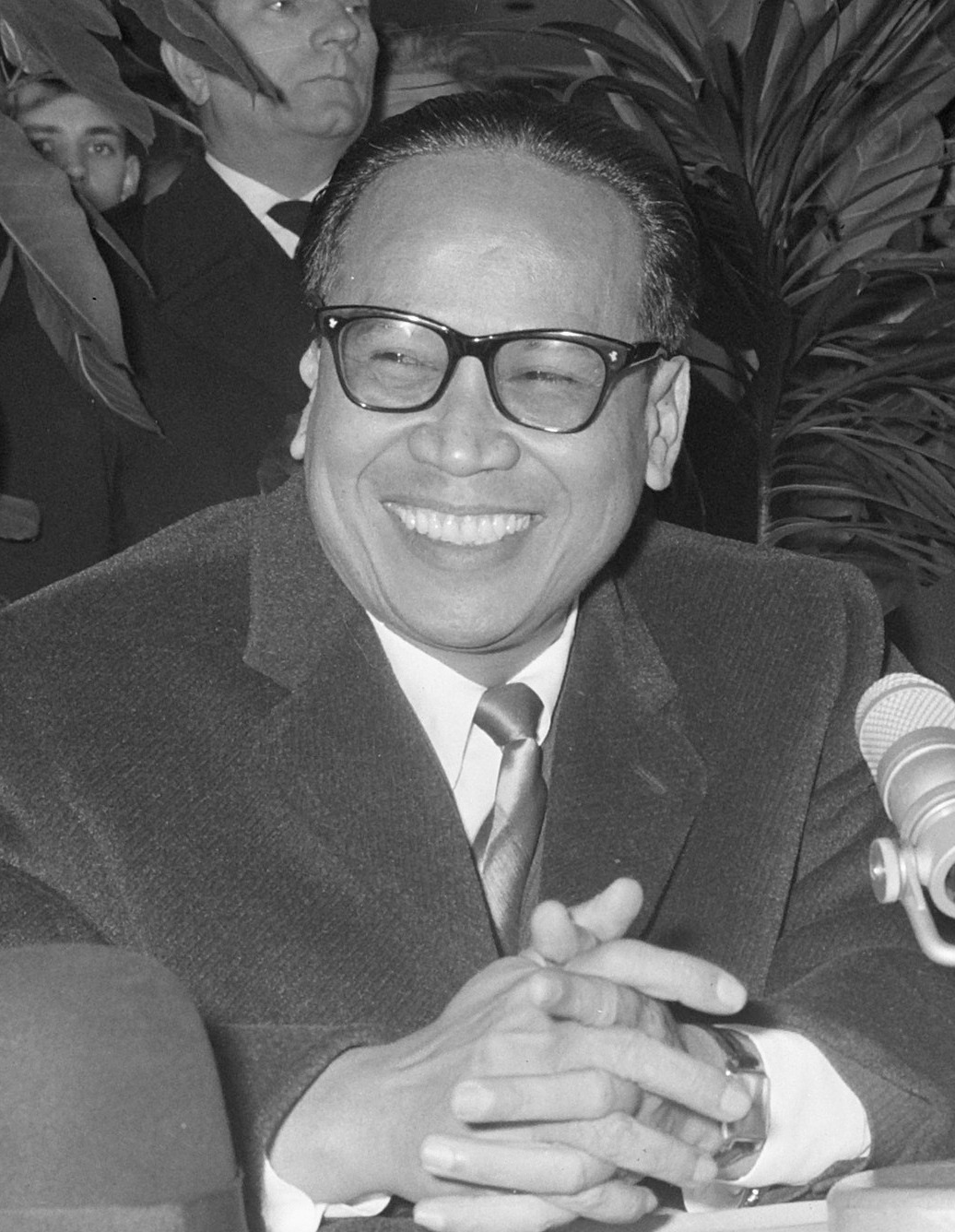
Foreign Minister Subandrio, pictured in 1964.

The following day (28 August), Deputy Foreign Minister of Indonesia Suwito summoned the British Charge d'Affaires to complain that the British notification had been far too casual, and whilst not asking for the British to receive Indonesian permission for such an action, he asked Britain to give a more formal, preferably written, announcement next time. Or else, Suwito warned, "present tension might result in an unplanned, unwanted but serious incident," a statement that was quickly passed on to the British government. The Charge d'Affairs replied that any further notice would be in writing, so as not to provoke any issue. Several days later, on 2 September, the day after the Labis landings, Subandrio took an even tougher line, telling the Australian Ambassador to Jakarta that the Victorious would be refused return passage through the Strait. The motivations for the ban are not clear, as official documents on it from the time are unavailable, but Subandrio's announcement was in line with government policy on passage through Indonesian waters, which was moving towards cracking down on unauthorized passages after an American carrier group had made the voyage earlier in the month. Indonesian policy-makers was also likely worried about the threat of British air power so close to Jakarta as well as the possibility that the British were attempting to provoke a response similar to the one the Vietnamese had made against America during the Gulf of Tonkin incident earlier that year. The latter seems exceedingly probable given Sukarno's furious response to the incident, and it is unsurprising in such a context that the response to the British incursion was equally forceful. In any case, the pervading thought in the Indonesian command was that this was a direct retaliation to the Pontian landings and a signal of British resolve, which although worrying could not overtake the British violation of their nautical claims in importance.

=== British resolve and plans for forcing the Strait ===
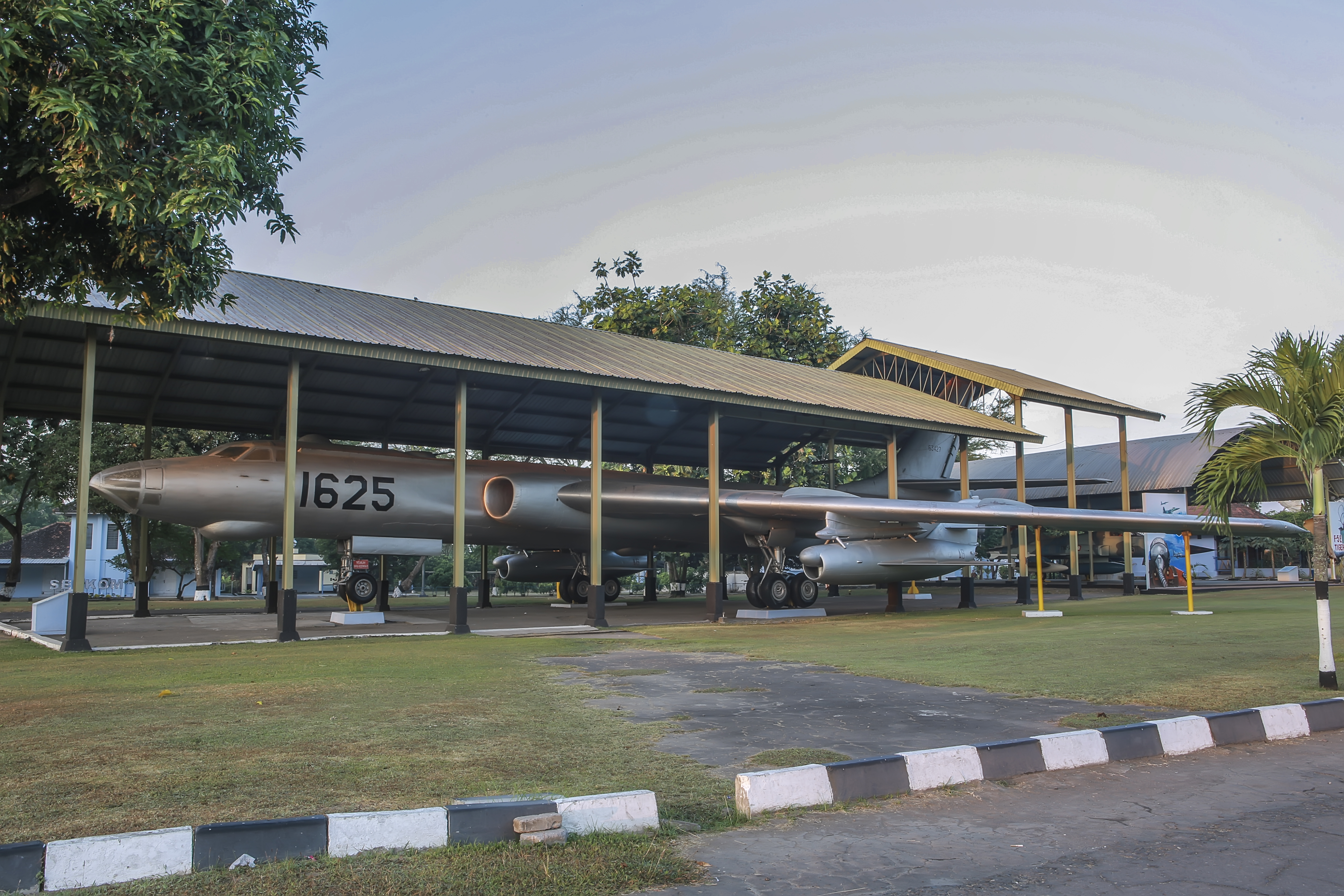
Tupolev Tu-16, one of the Soviet-made bomber aircraft of the Indonesian Air Force during the Cold War.

The Foreign Office, meanwhile, was determined not to back down in the face of what was seen as a further affront to British prestige and a challenge. Thorneycroft argued that if the Victorious did not pass through the Straits on her return journey, Britain "should suffer a substantial political defeat with unpredictable effects on our military position in the Far East," and was supported in this view by Admiral Mountbatten and David Luce, First Sea Lord and Chief of Naval Staff. Mountbatten went even further, warning Thorneycroft that a failure to meet the challenge would have "serious repercussions" on Britain's "whole military stature, not only in the Far East but worldwide." Luce and Mountbatten also thought this the perfect opportunity to put pressure on Jakarta for the first time, Luce stating that the return passage "might pass the initiative to us" and Mountbatten seeing it as an opportune moment to divert Sukarno from his Malaysian raiding. At the very least, innocent passage through the Strait had to be defended.

The views of Whitehall were not echoed by the naval commanders, especially Sir Varyl Begg, Commander-in-Chief of British forces in the region, who believed that the carrier was too weak to defend herself against Indonesian attack or strike in turn against them. Begg judged that the narrowness of the Strait combined with the local geography restricted the ships' movement and negated their radar, while custom prevented the carrier from flying its aircraft or even carrying them on deck, rendering it and the escorts extremely vulnerable in case of attack. He offered instead to send the destroyers, which were far more expendable than a fleet carrier. His views were supported by the High Commissioner to Malaysia, Lord Antony Head, who argued that there would be very little gain for Indonesia and loss for Britain if the carrier was not risked. Luce, however, remained adamant that the Victorious must sail through herself, but in order to ease Begg's fears assured him that the more modern carrier HMS Centaur would be on hand to provide air cover for the task force. Reinforcements were also rushed to Singapore to meet any Indonesian provocation. Thorneycroft ordered Begg to begin planning for the forced passage of the Strait, as officials determined on 3–4 September that the carrier must not be diverted.

In the resulting Cabinet meeting on naval deployments on 7 September, Thorneycroft and Mountbatten acknowledged that though the carrier would be at risk of severe damage or loss, preventing Sukarno from achieving a victory of brinkmanship was worth the peril. Though Foreign Secretary R.A. Butler strongly represented Begg's argument that the Victorious was too valuable an asset to lose, Thorneycroft's arguments won out. The Cabinet concurred that the ship should not be diverted, as a blockage of the carrier would increase Sukarno's prestige to no end, and approved preparations for Operation Althorpe, a plan to wipe out the Indonesian Air Force in retaliation for an attack. Although no precipitous decision was made, and though the Cabinet had agreed to examine the matter further.

=== The Indonesian alternative and resolution of the crisis ===
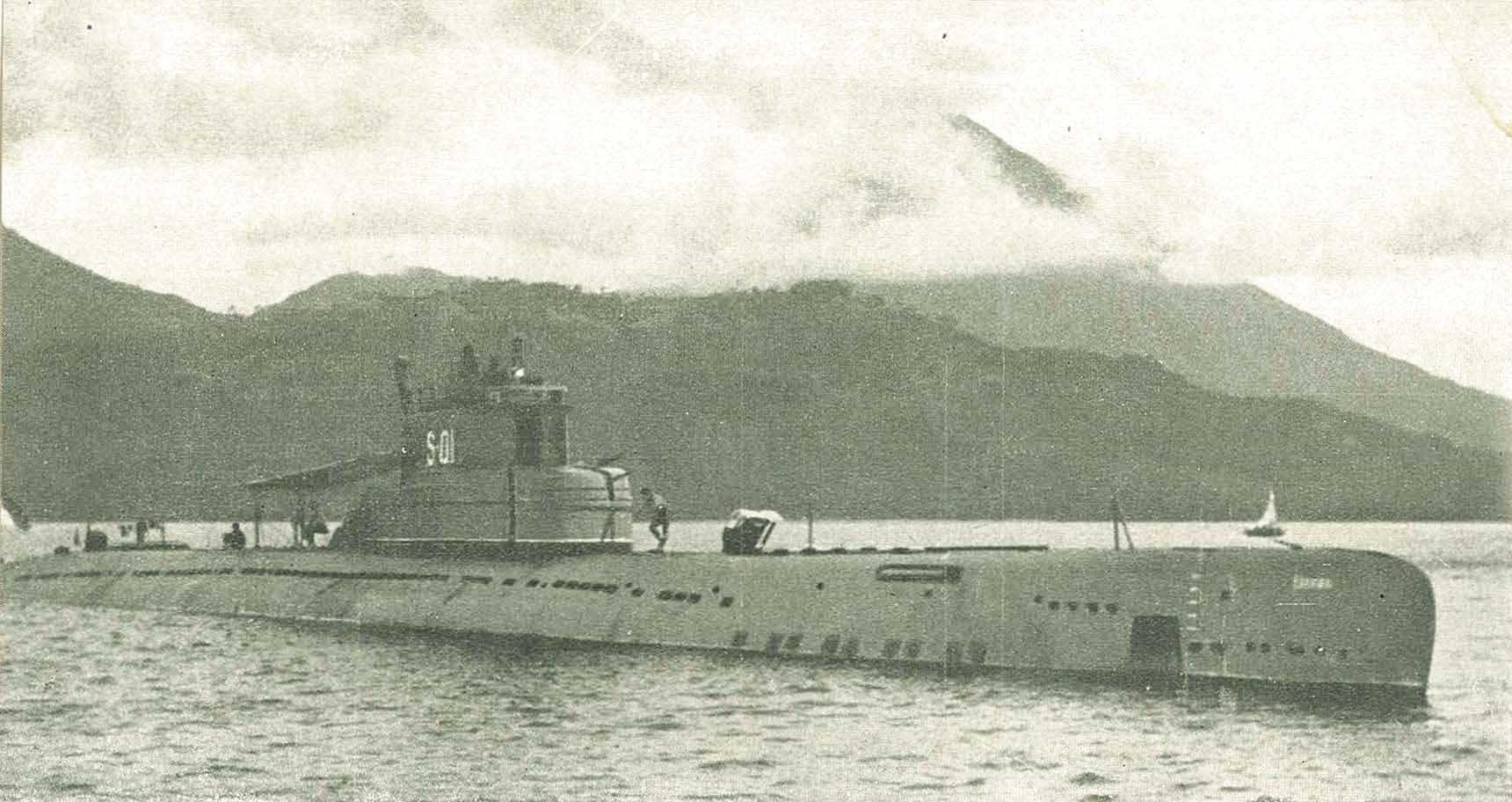
A Whiskey-class submarine of the Indonesian Navy.

On 9 September, Suwito informed a British diplomat that the Strait would be closed for naval exercises and that it would be appreciated if British warships steered clear of the area in the interim. To Britain, this seemed an escalation of the Crisis, as if the task force sailed through they might have to fight the Indonesian Navy directly, though in fact Indonesia was lessening its resolve to refuse the task force passage through the Strait, and hoped to keep the British from attempting to force their way through via more indirect means. This was not the way the British interpreted it, however, and the announcement triggered a new round of debates over the forced passage. Thorneycroft reviewed the plan with the Foreign Office, Ministry of Defence, and the Commonwealth Relations Office, most of whom told him to consider the opinions of the commanders on site. After remembering the influential Lord Head's endorsement of Begg's views, Thorneycroft was swayed, and decided that the two destroyers should proceed through the Strait without the Victorious, using the aircraft of that vessel and the Centaur for cover. Though worried about the psychological effect of the non-passage of the carrier, he was reminded that Britain had not informed Jakarta that the ship would return that way in the first place.

In the Cabinet meeting of the next morning, Butler raised the issue once more, informing them that Indonesia was attempting to prevent the innocent passage of the Victorious through the Sunda Strait on the pretext of naval exercises. Thorneycroft then spoke, stating that Sukarno would "gain in prestige" if he stopped the vessels from sailing through and that he might close other waters to the Royal Navy should he be successful. He acknowledged that he had originally planned to send the carrier through the Strait herself, but after discussion with Head and Begg decided to send the destroyers through instead, and send the Victorious north around Sumatra. The ships would still be able to uphold the right of passage while forcing Sukarno to either attack them or let them through. If Indonesia did attack the ships, "it would be an act of war... and we [Britain] should have to retaliate in force." Though the Cabinet noted that the destroyers could be lost if attacked, it was deemed necessary not to bend to Sukarno. Britain and Indonesia were on the precipice of all-out war.

What the Cabinet did not know yet, however, was that Indonesia had prepared an alternative to going over the edge. That same day, 10 September, Suwito asked for Britain to avoid a terrible 'misunderstanding,' and in a secret offer asked them to use the Lombok Strait instead. While further away from Jakarta, it was still claimed by Indonesia and might help the British attempt to save face while not stepping into a war they did not truly desire. With the Foreign Office's backing, Thorneycroft and Prime Minister Alec Douglas-Home approved the compromise and notified Suwito that the ships would take the Lombok Strait instead. Suwito appeared, according to eyewitnesses, "extremely relieved" at having avoided full conflict. The Victorious, after rendezvousing with the destroyer HMS Hampshire along with the frigates HMS Dido and HMS Berwick, sailed safely through the Lombok Strait on 12 September.

== Aftermath ==
The Sunda Straits Crisis was the closest the Indonesia-Malaysia confrontation came to total war, and in the end, a standoff was indeed avoided, but the shadow of conflict had not entirely passed. Indonesia had not yet finished with her landings in Malaysia, and Britain had committed to retaliation if worst came to worst after pressure applied by Malaysia through both government channels and the United Nations. However, the crisis rapidly abated after the passage of the Victorious through the Lombok Strait. Malaysian Prime Minister Tunku Abdul Rahman reported secret peace feelers from Sukarno on 16 September, and though the British doubted the sincerity of these offers there was little doubt that the incident had rattled Jakarta's confidence. Indonesia's support from Africa and Asia in the UN began to waver and only survived condemnation for their antics in Malaysia due to a veto from the Soviet Union. As a result of this success, the Tunku told the British on 18 September that he would not seek to retaliate directly and would attempt to bring the case back to the UN, to the relief of Britain, who welcomed the "let-off." Britain cancelled plans for any more inflammatory passages by their capital ships, and from that point forward in became clear that it was not in the interest of either side to go into war.

=== Disputed result ===
The debate over who came out the best from the Crisis, Britain or Indonesia, continues on into the present, and though many historians depict a British advantage (admittedly, these historians are British and American) there is a credible case for the success of both sides.

==== Britain ====
Though the Victorious had been forced to transit the Lombok Strait instead of the Sunda, most English-language historians suggest that Britain's show of force during the Sunda Straits Crisis was a political success. Numerous accounts, including Gregory Fremont-Barnes' History of Counterinsurgency, are content with a simplified version that Indonesia closed the Strait for one reason or another, and that the arrival of the task force assembled around the aging carrier had intimidated Sukarno into reopening it. A common argument is that the passage was an effective and daring show of force, and often ignores the Sunda Strait issue altogether. This was a sentiment shown by the crew of the Victorious herself, who during their passage through the Lombok Strait went to action stations at the sight of an Indonesian submarine and prepared to fire on it if there was any sign of hostility, and believed that the Indonesians thought it wiser to hold back in fear of their power. This was not a view that the British official reports sought to dissuade, depicting the result as a compromise concession by the Indonesians, who had in brinksmanship terms, 'blinked first' after British refusal to back down. The Foreign Office even went to the extremity of claiming that the Lombok Strait was just as convenient for passage as the Sunda Strait, despite its far greater distance from Singapore and Australia. At the very least, the subsequent Indonesian United Nations defeat and Abdul Rahman's agreement to avoid retaliation was a very positive result for Britain to take from the incident.

==== Indonesia ====
In contrast, historian Toh Boon Kwan argues that the Indonesians, rather than the British, were the primary beneficiaries of the crisis. He states that British policy makers, relieved at the opportunity to avoid a costly war, had failed to note that diverting the task force through the Lombok Strait was militarily advantageous to Indonesia, whose warships could screen the Victorious from a nearby naval base. Furthermore, forcing a capital ship of the vaunted Royal Navy to take a circuitous route through Indonesian waters proved a major diplomatic coup. Indonesian politicians gained confidence from the Crisis, now believing that they could go toe-to-toe with 'Imperialists' and survive "brushes with danger." This, acknowledged Toh, oddly contrasts with the defeatist views of the army, who were irritated at how close they had come to war, and who in any case carried out the policies of the Confrontation with little relish. It was the army, he asserts, that sent the peace initiatives to the Tunku in September.

== Sources ==
- Auerswald, David P. (2000). Disarmed Democracies: Domestic Institutions and the Use of Force. University of Michigan Press. ISBN 9780472111206.
- Easter, David (2012). Britain and the Confrontation with Indonesia, 1960–66. I.B.Tauris. ISBN 9780857721150.
- Elleman, Bruce A.; Paine, S.C.M. (2010). Naval Power and Expeditionary Wars: Peripheral Campaigns and New Theatres of Naval Warfare. Routledge. ISBN 9781136841699.
- Fremont-Barnes, Gregory (2015). A History of Counterinsurgency. ABC-CLIO. ISBN 9781440804250.
- Kraska, James; Pedrozo, Raul (2013). International Maritime Security Law. Martinus Nijhoff Publishers. ISBN 9789004233577.
- McCart, Neil (1998). HMS Victorious, 1937–1969. Fan Publications. ISBN 9781901225013.
- Roberts, John (2009). Safeguarding the Nation: The Story of the Modern Royal Navy. Seaforth Publishing. ISBN 9781848320437.
- Simpson, Emile (2012). War From the Ground Up: Twenty-First Century Combat as Politics. Oxford University Press. ISBN 9780199365357.
- Subritzky, J. (2000). Confronting Sukarno: British, American, Australian and New Zealand Diplomacy in the Malaysian-Indonesian Confrontation, 1961–5. Springer. ISBN 9780230595453.
- Toh, Boon Kwan (2005). "Brinkmanship and Deterrence Success during the Anglo-Indonesian Sunda Straits Crisis, 1964–1966". Journal of Southeast Asian Studies. 36 (3): 399–417. doi:10.1017/S0022463405000226. JSTOR 20072668.
- Tuck, Christopher (2016). Confrontation, Strategy and War Termination: Britain's Conflict with Indonesia. Routledge. ISBN 9781317162100.
