= General Travers =

General Travers may refer to:

- James Travers (1820–1884), British Indian Army general
- Paul Travers (1927–1983), British Army lieutenant general
- Robert Travers (MP) (c. 1596–1647), Irish general
