= Lord William Seymour =

Lord William Seymour may refer to:

- Lord William Seymour (MP) (1759–1837), MP for Coventry, Downton, and Orford
- Lord William Seymour (British Army officer) (1838–1915), British general
