= Robert Garrett (disambiguation) =

Robert Garrett (1875–1961) was an American athlete.

Robert Garrett may also refer to:

- Bobby Garrett (1932–1987), American football player
- Bob Garrett (TV), character on the TV series October Road
- Robert Garrett (footballer) (born 1988), Northern Irish footballer
- Robert Garrett (basketball) (born 1977), German basketball player
- Robert Garrett (British Army officer) (1794–1869)
