= David Russell (British Army officer) =

British army general (1809-1884)

General Sir David Russell KCB
- Born: 27 May 1809; Scotland
- Died: 16 January 1884 (aged 74); Kensington, London, England.
- Military career
- Allegiance: United Kingdom
- Branch: British Army
- Service years: 1828–
- Rank: General
- Commands: South-Eastern District
- Conflicts: Indian Rebellion
- Awards: Knight Commander of the Order of the Bath

General Sir David Russell KCB (27 May 1809 – 16 January 1884) was a British Army officer.

== Early life ==
Russell was born in Scotland in 1809 the son of James Russell (1783-1830), Colonel of the Stirlingshire Militia, and his wife, Mary Stirling (1786-1820). He was educated at Edinburgh and Dresden.

== Military career ==
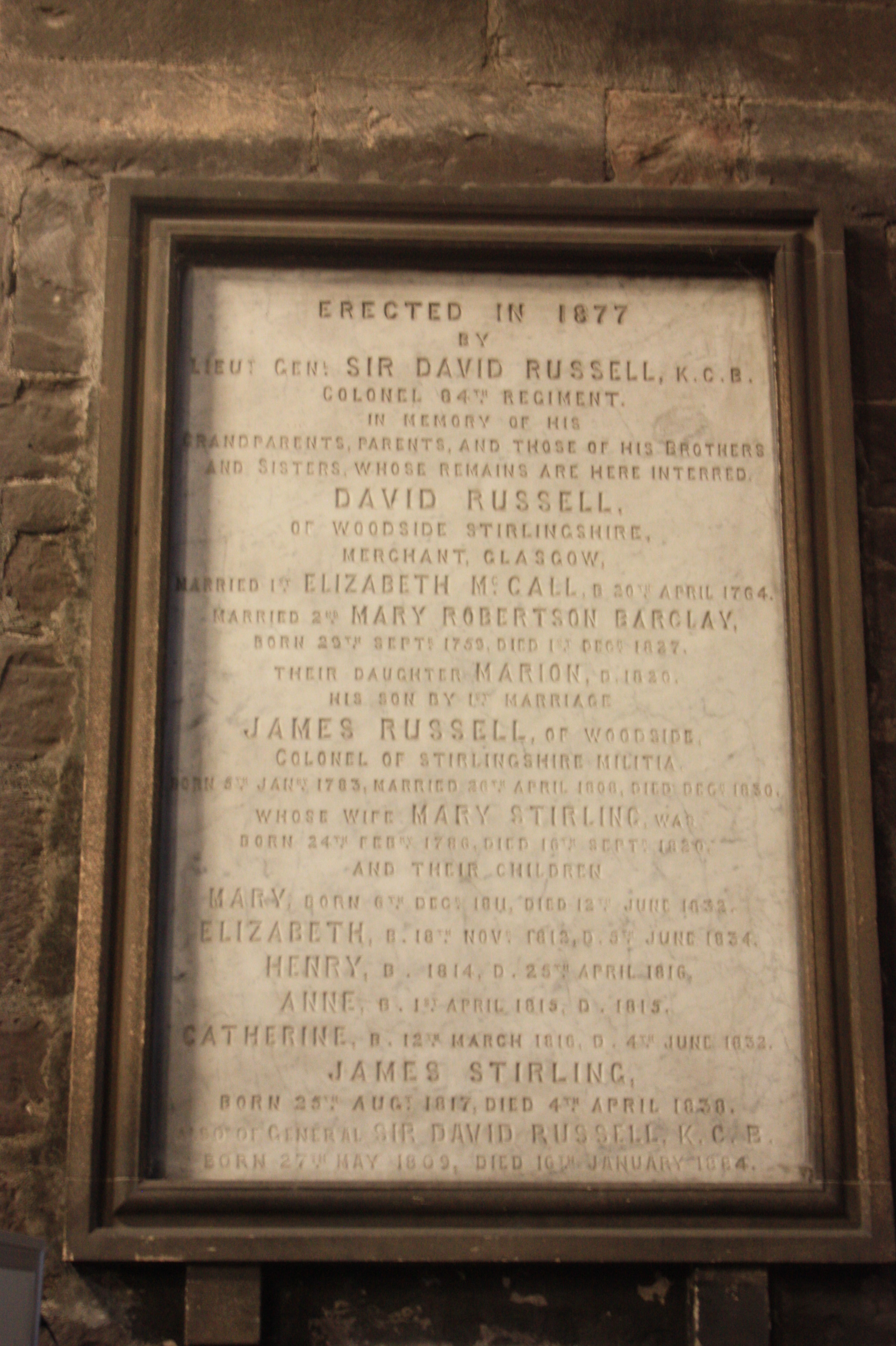
Memorial to Sir David Russell and his family, Dunblane Cathedral

Russell was commissioned as a cornet in the 7th Light Dragoons on 10 January 1828. He commanded the 5th Brigade at the second relief of Lucknow in November 1857 and commanded the 2nd Brigade at the capture of Lucknow in March 1858 during the Indian Rebellion. He became General Officer Commanding South-Eastern District in July 1868.

He was given the colonelcy of the 75th (Stirlingshire) Regiment of Foot on 18 January 1870 and transferred to the 84th (York and Lancaster) Regiment of Foot on 24 October 1872. He was made Knight Commander of the Bath (K.C.B.) by Queen Victoria on 20 May 1871.

He died in London on 16 Jan. 1884. He had lived at Westfield House (now known as the Abbotts Barton Hotel) near Canterbury.

== Later life ==
Russell died on 16 January 1884 aged 74 at his home at Elvaston Place in Kensington, London.

Military offices
Preceded by Charles Ellice	GOC South-Eastern District; 1868–1872	Succeeded by Sir Alfred Horsford
