= Terence McMeekin =

British Army general (1918–1984)

Lieutenant-General Sir Terence McMeekin KCB OBE
- Born: 27 September 1918; China
- Died: 3 August 1984 (aged 65); Tetbury, Gloucestershire
- Military career
- Allegiance: United Kingdom
- Branch: British Army
- Service years: 1938–1975
- Rank: Lieutenant-General
- Service number: 77531
- Unit: Royal Artillery
- Commands: 29th Field Regiment, Royal Artillery; 28th Commonwealth Infantry Brigade Group; 3rd Division; National Defence College; South East District
- Conflicts: World War II; Indonesia–Malaysia confrontation
- Awards: Knight Commander of the Order of the Bath; Officer of the Order of the British Empire

Lieutenant-General Sir Terence Douglas Herbert McMeekin KCB OBE (27 September 1918 – 3 August 1984) was a British Army officer who commanded 3rd Division.

== Military career ==
McMeekin was commissioned into the Royal Artillery in 1938. He served in World War II as a general staff officer before becoming Brigade Major, Royal Artillery for 1st Airborne Division in 1945. He was appointed Commanding Officer of 29th Field Regiment, Royal Artillery in 1960, Chief Instructor (Tactics) at the School of Artillery at Larkhill in 1962 and Commander of 28th Commonwealth Infantry Brigade Group in Malaya in 1964, where his troops were responsible for capturing numerous Indonesian raiding forces, most prominently at Kesang River on 29 October 1964. He went on to be Director of Public Relations (Army) at the Ministry of Defence in 1967, General Officer Commanding (GOC) 3rd Division in 1968 and Commandant of the National Defence College in 1970. His last appointment was as GOC South East District in 1972 before retiring in 1975.

In retirement he was Lieutenant of the Tower of London from 1981 and 1983 and a Freeman of the City of London.

He lived at the Old Rectory in Beverston in Gloucestershire and there is a memorial to him at St Mary's Church there.

Military offices
Preceded by Tony Deane-Drummond	GOC 3rd Division; 1968−1970	Succeeded by Glyn Gilbert
Preceded by Sir Allan Taylor	GOC South East District; 1972−1974	Succeeded by Sir James Wilson
