= Edward Gibbs =

British Army officer

Lieutenant-General Sir Edward Gibbs KCB
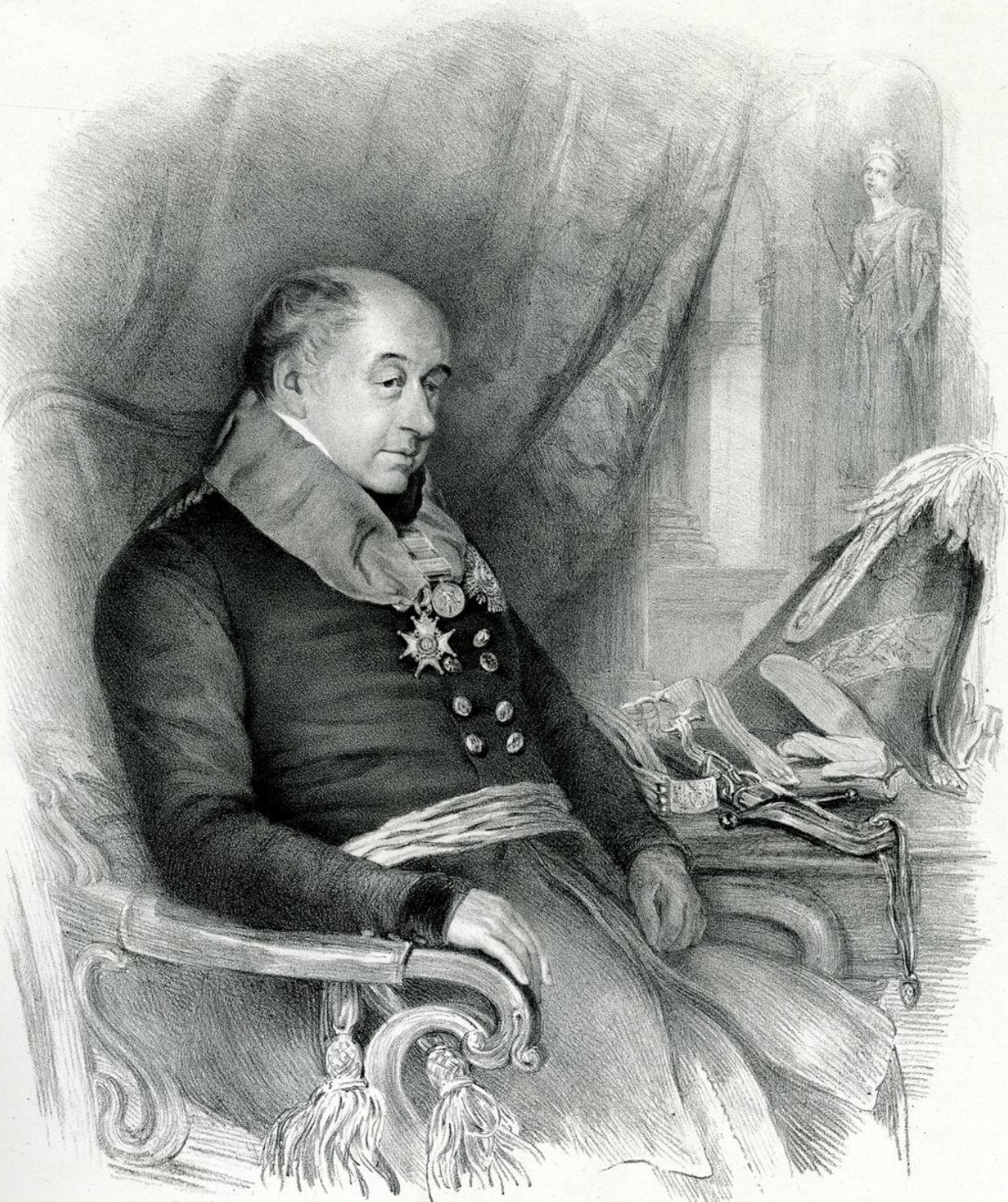
- Lithograph by Maxim Gauci, c. 1834–1850
- Born: c. 1777
- Died: 9 January 1847
- Military career
- Allegiance: United Kingdom
- Branch: British Army
- Service years: 1798–1847
- Rank: Lieutenant-General
- Conflicts: French Revolutionary Wars; Ferrol Expedition; Napoleonic Wars; Peninsular War; Battle of Vimeiro; Battle of Sabugal; Battle of Fuentes de Oñoro; Siege of Ciudad Rodrigo; Siege of Badajoz (WIA); Battle of Vitoria; Siege of Antwerp

Lieutenant-General Sir Edward Gibbs KCB (c. 1777 – 9 January 1847) was a British Army officer who became Lieutenant Governor of Jersey.

== Military career ==
Gibbs took part in the Ferrol Expedition in 1800 during the War of the Second Coalition and in the retreat to Corunna in 1809 during the Peninsular War. He also commanded 2nd Bn of the 62nd Regiment of Foot under the Duke of Wellington taking part in the Battle of Fuentes de Oñoro in 1811 and the Siege of Ciudad Rodrigo in 1812. He commanded a brigade at the Siege of Badajoz in March 1812 before commanding the 1st Bn of the 52nd Regiment of Foot at the Battle of Vitoria in 1813. He then went to the Netherlands and took part in the bombardment of Antwerp in 1814.

He was appointed Lieutenant Governor of Jersey in 1838 and died in office in 1847. He was also briefly Colonel of the 68th Regiment of Foot in 1844 before transferring as Colonel to the 68th (Durham) Regiment of Foot (Light Infantry) (1844 to his death in 1847).

Government offices
Preceded by Archibald Campbell	Lieutenant Governor of Jersey; 1838–1847	Succeeded by Sir James Reynett
Military offices
Preceded by Sir William Johnston	Colonel of the 68th (Durham) Regiment of Foot (Light Infantry); 1844	Succeeded by Charles Nicol
Preceded by Sir Thomas Arbuthnot	Colonel of the 52nd (Oxfordshire) Regiment of Foot; 1844–1847	Succeeded by Sir Archibald Maclaine
