= Landing at Kesang River =

- Part of the Indonesia-Malaysia confrontation
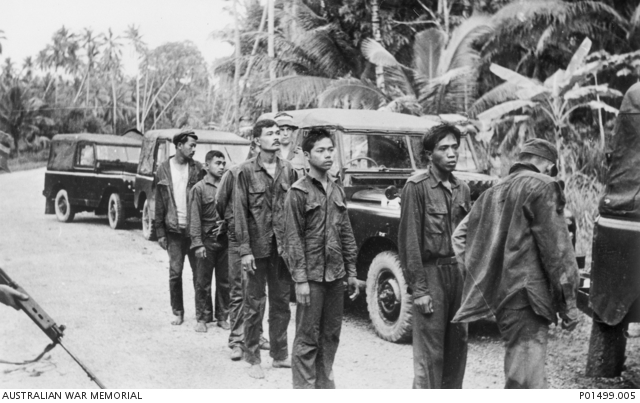
- Indonesian infiltrators captured near the Kesang River by Australian troops.
Date	29 October 1964
Location	Johor, Malaysia
Result	Commonwealth victory

Belligerents
United Kingdom; Australia; Malaysia	Indonesia

Commanders and leaders
(United Kingdom) Terence McMeekin (Australia) Bruce McDonald (Malaysia) Unknown	(Indonesia) Unknown

Strength
2,000	52

Casualties and losses
Minimal	50 killed or captured

The Landing at Kesang River (29 October 1964) was an amphibious raid conducted by a small force of Indonesian volunteers near the Kesang River, on the border between the Malaysian states of Malacca and Johore on the southwestern part of the Malay Peninsula. The landing was part of the broader Indonesia-Malaysia confrontation, an undeclared war fought between Malaysia and Indonesia during the early 1960s over the creation of an independent Malaysian Federation. The conflict chiefly encompassed parts of northern Borneo, areas that Indonesia sought control in her bid to increase her power and influence in Southeast Asia; however, the landing represented a shift of the operational sphere toward the mainland.

The landing was part of an extended campaign of similar incursions into Malaysian territory in late 1964 launched by Indonesian President Sukarno to substantiate an aggressively nationalistic speech delivered on 17 August of that year and to establish a base for a potential Communist rebellion. A first landing was dispatched that very night to the Pontian District of Johore, but was quickly halted by Commonwealth security forces. The operation at Kesang River was the sixth attempt at seaborne infiltration. During the night of 29 October, two groups were landed, one on each side of the river. As with all previous attempts, civilians reported the raiders to local police; soon, Commonwealth troops quickly swept the area and captured nearly all of the Indonesian party.

Kesang River was not the last attempt by Indonesian forces to establish a foothold in the Malayan wilderness, but continual Allied capture of the raiders began to lessen the security and diplomatic ramifications of such efforts so as to make them far less effective. However, the effort is notable for being the first occasion on which Australian troops fought against their Indonesian neighbors, a development that was the subject of controversy in both nations and helped to escalate tensions between them.

== Origins ==
During the celebrations of Indonesia's independence from the Netherlands on 17 August 1964, President of Indonesia Sukarno declared that the year to come would be a 'Year of Dangerous Living.' This was meant to signal his intent upon intensifying the ongoing Confrontation by expanding the conflict to mainland Malaysia, a risky move that might provoke a major British response. Sukarno meant to follow through with his statement immediately, and had planned to launch a series of airborne and seaborne attacks by Indonesian 'volunteers' on the Malay peninsula. Though this was a potentially dangerous effort, as it took the war out of its containment in Borneo, it had a chance of capitalizing upon recent unrest in Malaya and Singapore by putting Indonesian soldiers and sympathizers inside Malaysian territory, where they could attempt to raise the populace against a new and unpopular government. The first landing was made at Pontian on the night of Sukarno's speech, and subsequent operations were attempted at Labis, Malacca, Panchor, and Pontian again throughout the fall. The next landing was set for the night of 29 October, in the jungles surrounding the Kesang River.

== Landings ==
In the night of 29 October, 52 Indonesian volunteers sailed across the Straits of Malacca in commandeered fishing vessels, and landed on each side of the western mouth of the Kesang River. Their objective was to avoid being sighted initially by Malaysian security forces and slip quietly into the swampland, where they would attempt to blend in with the populace, begin sowing the seeds of rebellion, and launch guerrilla raids against Malaysian infrastructure. However, Malaysian fishermen spotted the raiders in the process of landing, and quickly informed the police. British troops of General Terence McMeekin's 28th Commonwealth Brigade were immediately directed to the scene, where they swept the region and killed or captured all but two of the invaders, who managed to fade into the wilderness. The remainder were swiftly shipped off to internment locations. The British were assisted by Australian troops of the Royal Australian Regiment's 3rd Battalion, led by Lieutenant-Colonel Bruce McDonald, who had also received similar tip-offs and assisted in the rout of the Indonesian force.

== Aftermath ==
Though the Landing at Kesang River was a failure for Indonesia, with none of the mission's objectives being completed, this did not deter them from future raiding attempts. One raid was attempted on the east coast of Johore at Kuala Sedili on 15 November, before the operation returned to the west once more with landings at Semarah and Kuala Buntu in December. Anglo-Malaysian naval forces intercepted several seaborne raids in December and January, before the raiding began to die down in the early part of 1965, relieving British planners of the need to make retaliatory strikes against Indonesian bases, which would have escalated the conflict yet further in a tense period.

The greatest effects of the raid were, in fact, felt in Australia, who had committed troops to a combat action for the first time. Prime Minister Robert Menzies solemnly announced that Australians had gone into battle in Parliament the following day, to widespread reaction in both Indonesia and Australia. At home, some feared that the two nations were on the 'road to war,' while in Indonesia Foreign Minister Subandrio arraigned the Australian move, stating that his nation 'would not be bullied,' and the press ratified his statement. The controversy was further compounded by Menzies's announcement of conscription on 10 November, which triggered anti-conscription rallies and incited more of the wrath the Indonesian media. In order to turn the tide of the conflict away from mainland Malaysia, the Australian government reluctantly acceded to British pressure and landed a battalion in Borneo, which saw numerous combat action in defending and leading raids over the Indonesian border.

== Sources ==
- Cheng Leng, Lim; Eng Lee, Khor (2016). Waging an Unwinnable War: The Communist Insurgency in Malaysia (1948–1989) (online ed.). Xlibris Corporation. ISBN 978-1-5245-1863-9.
- Easter, David (2012). Britain and the Confrontation with Indonesia, 1960–66. I. B. Tauris. ISBN 978-0-85772-115-0.
- Pfenningworth, Ian (2008). Tiger Territory. Rosenberg. ISBN 978-1-922013-18-7.
- Naval Review. Annapolis, MD: United States Naval Institute. 1969. ISSN 0077-6238.
- The Journal of the Royal Artillery. Vol. 100–103. Woolwich: Royal Artillery Institution. 1973. OCLC 8433089.
- Tink, Andrew (2014). Australia 1901 – 2001: A narrative history. NewSouth. ISBN 9781742241876.
