= South-Eastern District (British Army) =

Former district command of the British Army

- Active: 1856–1903; 1967–1995
- Country: United Kingdom
- Branch: British Army
- Type: Home Command
- Garrison/HQ: Dover (19th century); Aldershot Garrison (1967–1995)

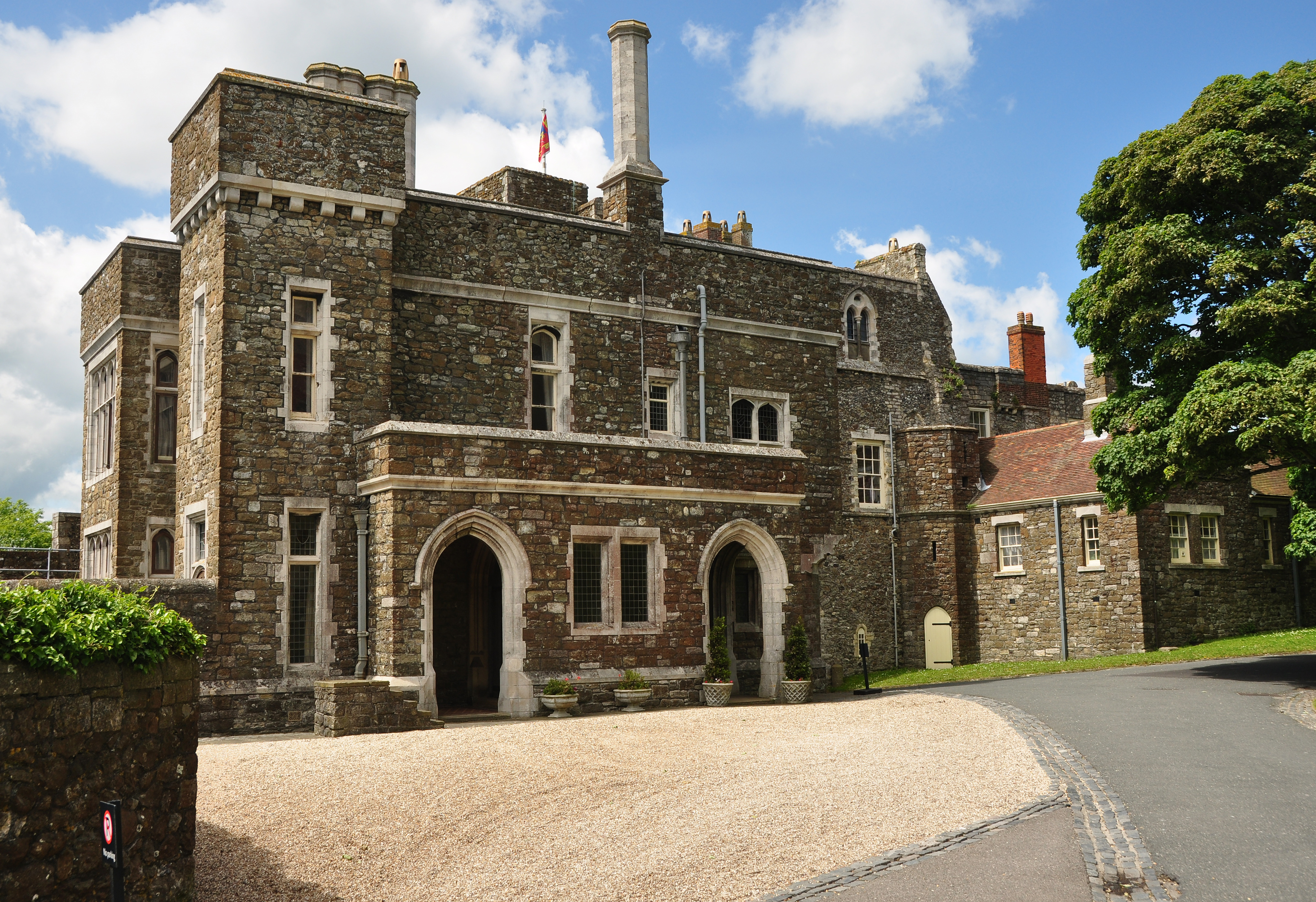
Constable's Tower, Dover Castle, command headquarters in the 19th century

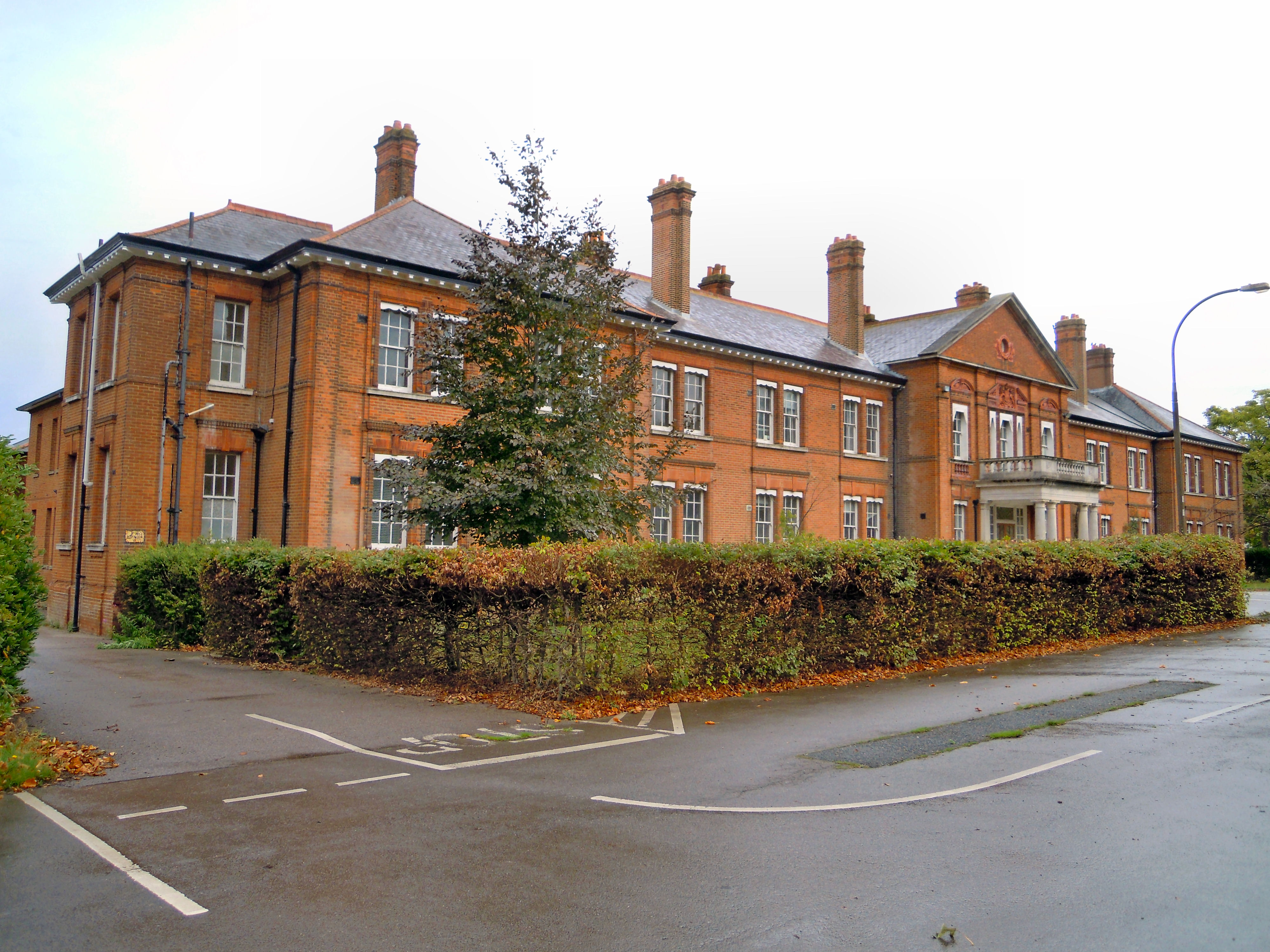
Military Headquarters, Aldershot, command headquarters 1967–1995

South-Eastern District was a district command of the British Army from the mid-19th century until 1903. It was in existence again between 1967 and 1995.

== History ==
=== Early formation ===
Historically troops based in the South-Eastern counties had reported direct to Army Headquarters in London but in July 1856 South-Eastern District was formed under Lieutenant-General Sir Colin Campbell. Campbell was recalled to become Commander-in-Chief, India just three months later and Lieutenant-General Sir Frederick Love was appointed to the command in his place. The headquarters of the command was established at Dover Castle.

=== Re-formation ===
The district was formed from Aldershot Command as part of the Territorial Army Volunteer Reserve in 1967. It had its headquarters at Aldershot Garrison, and was placed under the command of HQ UK Land Forces in 1972. It was disbanded again on the formation of HQ Land Command in 1995.

== Commanders ==
General officers commanding included:
South-Eastern District

- July-September 1856 Lieutenant-General Sir Colin Campbell
- 1856-1857 Lieutenant-General Sir Frederick Love
- 1857-1861 Lieutenant-General Robert Mansel
- 1861-1865 Lieutenant-General Arthur Dalzell
- 1865-1866 Lieutenant-General Sir Robert Garrett
- 1866-1867 Major-General William McCleverty
- 1867-1868 Major-General Charles Ellice
- 1868-1872 Lieutenant-General Sir David Russell
- 1872-1874 Major-General Sir Alfred Horsford
- 1874-1877 Major-General William Parke
- 1877-1880 Lieutenant-General Lord Alexander Russell
- 1880-1885 Major-General Edward Newdegate
- 1885-1887 Lieutenant-General Percy Feilding
- 1887-1891 Major-General Alexander Montgomery Moore
- 1891-1896 Major-General Lord William Seymour
- 1896-1898 Major-General Sir William Butler
- 1898-1899 Major-General Leslie Rundle
- 1899-1902 Major-General Henry Hallam Parr
- 1902-1903 Major-General Leslie Rundle

South East District

- 1967-1969 Major-General Charles Stainforth
- 1969-1972 Major-General Bernard Penfold
- 1972 Lieutenant-General Sir Allan Taylor
- 1972-1974 Lieutenant-General Sir Terence McMeekin
- 1974-1977 Lieutenant-General Sir James Wilson
- 1977-1979 Lieutenant-General Sir Anthony Farrar-Hockley
- 1979-1981 Lieutenant-General Sir George Cooper
- 1981-1982 Lieutenant-General Sir Paul Travers
- 1982-1983 Lieutenant-General Sir Richard Trant
- 1983-1985 Lieutenant-General Sir Geoffrey Howlett
- 1985-1988 Lieutenant-General Sir Michael Gray
- 1988-1990 Lieutenant-General Sir Peter de la Billière
- 1990-1994 Lieutenant-General Sir Richard Swinburn

Southern District

- 1994-1995 Lieutenant-General Sir Anthony Denison-Smith
