= Alexander Montgomery Moore =

General Sir Alexander Montgomery Moore KCB
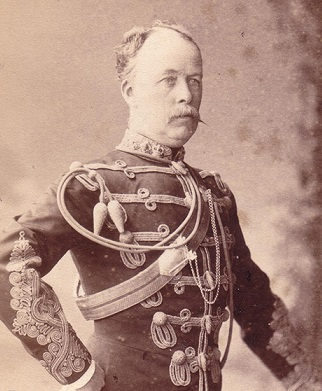
- Born: 6 April 1833
- Died: 17 January 1919 (aged 85)
- Military career
- Allegiance: United Kingdom
- Branch: British Army
- Rank: General
- Commands: The troops in Canada
- Awards: Knight Commander of the Order of the Bath

General Sir Alexander George Montgomery Moore KCB (6 April 1833 – 17 January 1919) was an officer of the British Army.

== Biography ==
He was born on 6 April 1833, the son of Alexander James Montgomery Moore of Garvey House, Aughnacloy, County Tyrone, son of Nathaniel Montgomery Moore MP, and his wife Susanna née Matcham, a niece of Lord Nelson. He was educated at Eton. He served as aide-de-camp to the Commander of the Forces in Ireland (Lord Seaton) from 1856 to 1860, commanded the 4th Hussars from 1868 to 1880, and served as assistant adjutant general for the Dublin district from 1880 to 1885. He was appointed commander of the Belfast district in 1886, of the South-Eastern District in April 1887, of the troops in Canada in June 1893 and at Aldershot in 1899. He was made KCB in 1900 and was colonel of the 4th Hussars.

Montgomery Moore was married on 30 September 1857 to the Hon. Jane Colborne, daughter of Lord Seaton. The owner of 3,500 acres, he was a justice of the peace for Belfast and a deputy lieutenant for Tyrone, and served as High Sheriff of Tyrone in 1904. He lived at Gipsy Lodge, Norwood SE and was a member of the Carlton Club and the United Service Club. He died on 17 January 1919.

Military offices
Preceded by Percy Feilding	GOC South-Eastern District; 1887–1891	Succeeded by Lord William Seymour
Preceded by Sir John Ross	Commander of the British Troops in Canada; 1893–1898	Succeeded by Lord William Seymour
