= Military Headquarters Building, Aldershot =

Military Headquarters Building
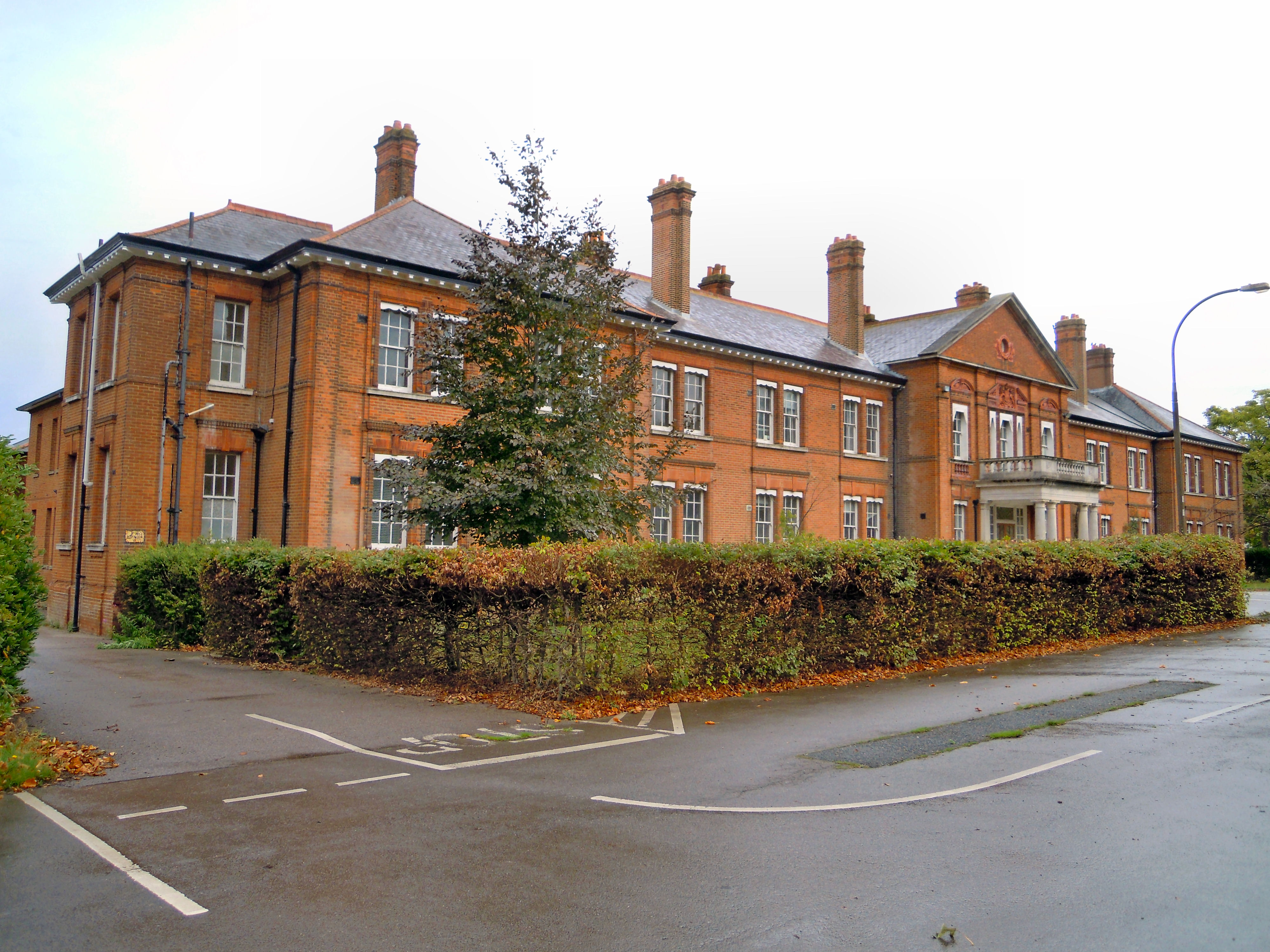
- Military Headquarters Building
- Interactive map of the Military Headquarters Building area

General information
- Architectural style: Victorian style
- Location: Steeles Road, Aldershot
- Coordinates: 51.2581°N 0.7609°W
- Completed: 1895

Design and construction
- Designations

Listed Building – Grade II
- Official name: South East District Headquarters Building of General Officers Commanding
- Designated: 17 April 1975
- Reference no.: 1092611

The Military Headquarters Building is a military office building in Aldershot, Hampshire. It is a Grade II listed building.

== History ==
The foundation stone for the building was laid by General the Duke of Connaught, the General Officer Commanding Aldershot Command, on 28 March 1894. The building, which was designed by Thomas Jerome in the Victorian style as the military headquarters for Aldershot Command, was built by Martin Wells & Co and completed in 1895.

It subsequently went on to become the military headquarters for a succession of military formations: for Aldershot Area within South Eastern Command in February 1941, for Aldershot District within Southern Command in September 1944, for South-East District in 1967, for Southern District in 1992 and finally for 4th Division in 1995. After 4th Division was disbanded in 2012, the building was briefly used by Regional Command until it moved to modern facilities at Montgomery House in May 2014.

The Military Headquarters Building was refurbished by Millgrove Construction to provide a neighbourhood centre for the Wellesley Project, a major residential development by Grainger plc, in 2016.
