= Robert Percy Douglas =

British Army general

General Sir Robert Percy Douglas Bt
- Born: 29 August 1805
- Died: 30 September 1891 (aged 86)
- Military career
- Allegiance: United Kingdom
- Branch: British Army
- Service years: 1818–1868
- Rank: General

General Sir Robert Percy Douglas, 4th Baronet (29 August 1805 – 30 September 1891) was a British Army officer who became Lieutenant Governor of Jersey.

== Early life ==
The son of General Sir Howard Douglas, 3rd Baronet, Douglas was educated at High Wycombe Royal Grammar School. As the last surviving son of his father, he succeeded to the Baronetcy in 1861.

== Military career ==
He was commissioned into the British Army in 1819 and rose to become colonel of 2nd Battalion of the Prince of Wales's (North Staffordshire) Regiment. He was Lieutenant Governor of Jersey from 1860 to 1863 and then for 5 years Lieutenant-Governor of the Cape of Good Hope, when he held the local rank of lieutenant general.

He was given the colonelcy of the 98th (The Prince of Wales's) Regiment of Foot from 1864 until the regiment merged with the 64th Regiment of Foot in 1881 to form The Prince of Wales's (North Staffordshire Regiment). He was then colonel of the 2nd Battalion in the new regiment until his death. He was promoted full general on 22 May 1874.

A daughter, Ann Penelope Harriet (1852–1927), married Sir Hugh Low at Bradford, Somerset, in 1885, and his third son was Sir Arthur Percy Douglas, 5th Baronet, Under-Secretary for Defence, New Zealand.

General Robert Percy Douglas died on 30 September 1891 aged 87 at The Hurst, his residence in Bournemouth.

A£1 coin featuring the Percy Douglas, a three-masted ship, was issued in his memory.

The town of Douglas, situated near the confluence of the Orange and Vaal Rivers in the Northern Cape province of South Africa is named after him.

Government offices
Preceded by Godfrey Mundy	Lieutenant Governor of Jersey; 1860–1862	Succeeded by B. Loch; Acting
Baronetage of Great Britain
Preceded by Howard Douglas	Baronet (of Carr); 1861–1891	Succeeded by Arthur Percy Douglas
