= Allan Taylor (British Army officer) =

British Army general (1919–2004)

Lieutenant-General Sir Allan Taylor KBE MC
- Born: 26 March 1919; Caterham, Surrey, England
- Died: 13 June 2004 (aged 85)
- Military career
- Allegiance: United Kingdom
- Branch: British Army
- Service years: 1940–1976
- Rank: Lieutenant-General
- Service number: 126636
- Unit: Royal Tank Regiment
- Commands: South East District; Staff College, Camberley; 1st Division; Berlin Brigade; Royal Armoured Corps Gunnery School; 3rd Royal Tank Regiment; 5th Royal Tank Regiment
- Conflicts: Second World War
- Awards: Knight Commander of the Order of the British Empire; Military Cross

Lieutenant-General Sir Allan Macnab Taylor, KBE, MC (26 March 1919 – 13 June 2004) was a British Army officer who commanded the 1st Division from 1968 to 1970.

== Military career ==
Educated at Fyling Hall School, Taylor was commissioned into the Royal Armoured Corps in 1940 during the Second World War. As a squadron commander with the 7th Royal Tank Regiment, he took part in the Normandy landings in June 1944, the seizing of a bridgehead over the River Odon later in the month and the Battle for Caen in July 1944. He also took part in the crossing of the River Rhine in March 1945.

Taylor was made commanding officer of the 5th Royal Tank Regiment in 1960 and commanding officer of the 3rd Royal Tank Regiment in 1961. He was appointed assistant adjutant and quartermaster general for the 1st Armoured Division in 1962, Commandant of the Royal Armoured Corps Gunnery School at Lulworth in 1963 and commander of the Berlin Brigade in Germany in 1964. He went on to be General Officer Commanding 1st Division in 1968, Commandant of the Staff College, Camberley in 1970 and General Officer Commanding South East District in 1972. His last posting was as Deputy Commander-in-Chief UK Land Forces in 1973 before he retired in 1976.

== Family ==
In 1945 Taylor married Madelaine Turpin (marriage dissolved in 1963); they had two daughters.

Military offices
Preceded by Richard Ward	General Officer Commanding 1st Division; 1968–1970	Succeeded by Jack Harman
Preceded by John Sharp	Commandant of the Staff College, Camberley; 1970–1972	Succeeded by Patrick Howard-Dobson
Preceded by Bernard Penfold	General Officer Commanding South East District; April–December 1972	Succeeded by Terence McMeekin
Preceded by Sir Frank King	Deputy Commander-in-Chief UK Land Forces; 1973–1976	Succeeded by Sir Hugh Beach
