= Frederick Love =

British Army general

General Sir Frederick Love GCB KH
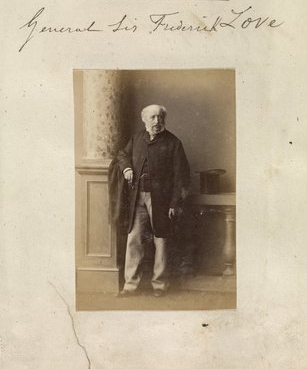
- Born: 1789
- Died: 13 January 1866 (aged 76–77)
- Military career
- Allegiance: United Kingdom
- Branch: British Army
- Service years: 1804–1857
- Rank: General
- Conflicts: Napoleonic Wars; Finnish War; Peninsular War; Battle of Corunna; Battle of the Coa; Battle of Busaco; Battle of Pombal; Battle of Redinha; Battle of Casal Novo; Battle of Foz de Arouce; Battle of Sabugal; Battle of Fuentes d'Onoro; Siege of Ciudad Rodrigo; Siege of Antwerp; War of 1812; Battle of New Orleans (WIA); Hundred Days; Battle of Waterloo (WIA); Rebellions of 1837–1838
- Awards: Military General Service Medal

General Sir James Frederick Love GCB KH (1789 – 13 January 1866) was a British Army officer who served as Lieutenant Governor of Jersey.

== Military career ==
Love was commissioned into the 52nd Regiment of Foot in 1804 and took part in the retreat to Corunna and the Battle of Bussaco during the Peninsular War. He was wounded at the Battle of Waterloo in 1815 and saved Bristol during the riots of 1831. He was appointed British resident at Zakynthos in 1835, Lieutenant Governor of Jersey in 1852 and General Officer Commanding South-Eastern District in 1856 before becoming Inspector-General of Infantry in 1857.

He was Colonel of the 57th (West Middlesex) Regiment of Foot from 1856 to 1865 and Colonel of 43rd (Monmouthshire) Regiment of Foot from 1865 to his death.

He was promoted general on 10 August 1864.

== Family ==
In 1825, he married Mary Heaviside; they had no children.

Government offices
Preceded by Sir James Reynett	Lieutenant Governor of Jersey; 1852–1856	Succeeded by Godfrey Mundy
Military offices
Preceded by Sir Colin Campbell	GOC South-Eastern District; 1856–1857	Succeeded by Robert Mansel
Preceded by Sir James Fergusson	Colonel of the 43rd (Monmouthshire) Regiment of Foot; 1865–1866	Succeeded by Sir Robert Garrett
Preceded by Lord Hardinge	Colonel of the 57th (West Middlesex) Regiment of Foot; 1856–1865	Succeeded by Charles Richard Fox
