= Landing at Pontian =

Indonesian advance on Pontian Island

- Part of the Indonesia–Malaysia confrontation
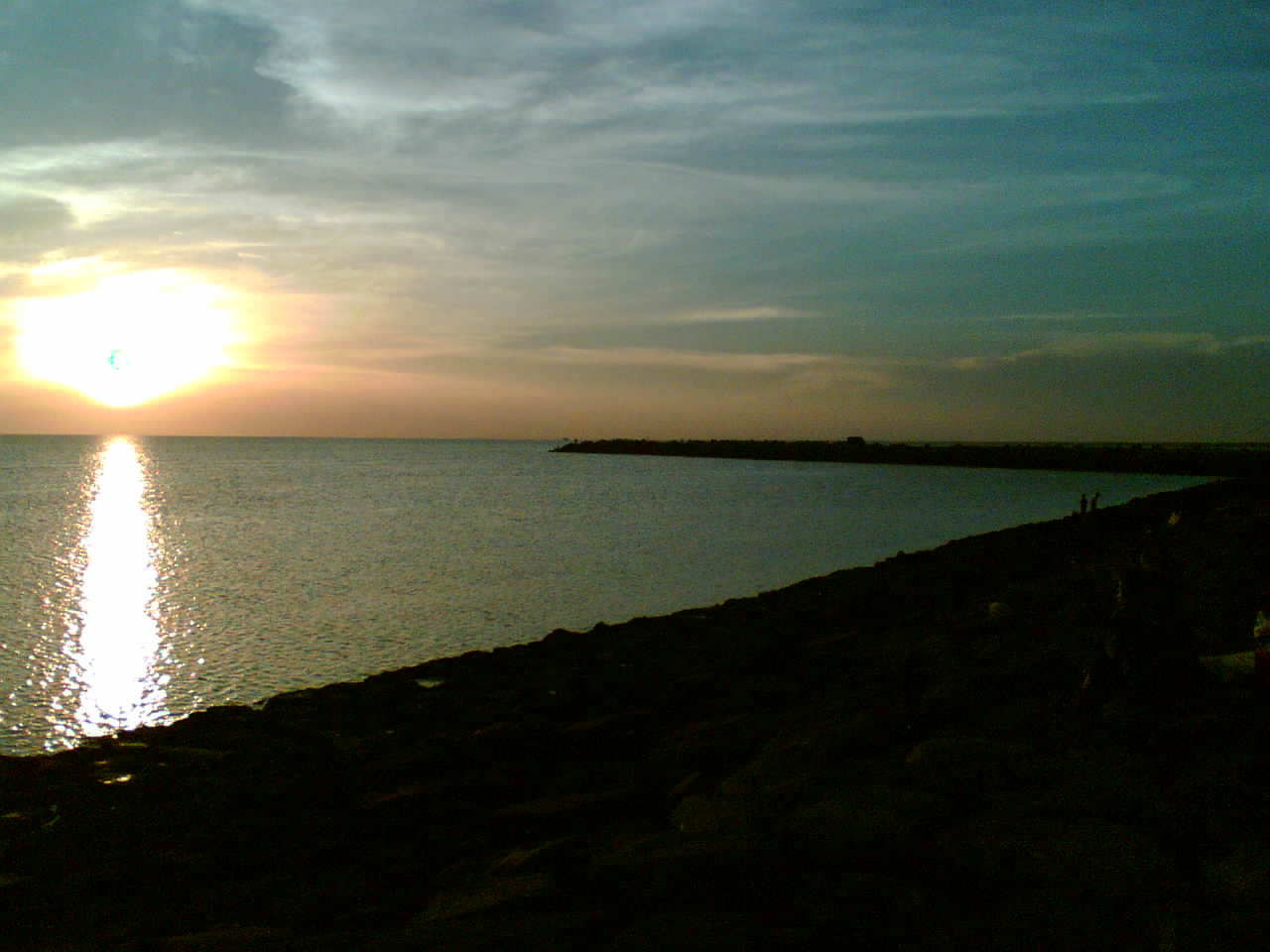
- The Pontian seaside, where Indonesian forces landed in August 1964.
Date	17 August 1964
Location	Pontian District, Johor, Malaysia
Result	Commonwealth victory

Belligerents
Malaysia; United Kingdom	Indonesia

Commanders and leaders
(Malaysia) Hassan Yunus	(Indonesia) Sukarno

Strength
Unknown	108 paratroopers (accompanied by Malaysian-Chinese guides)

Casualties and losses
4 killed	104 killed or captured

The Landing at Pontian (17 August 1964) was an amphibious landing made by a small body of Indonesian troops in the Pontian District, Johor, Malaysia. The landing took place during the Indonesia-Malaysia confrontation, an undeclared war fought between Malaysia and Indonesia during the early 1960s over the creation of a Malaysian Federation encompassing parts of northern Borneo, areas that Indonesia sought to increase its own power in Southeast Asia.

On 17 August 1964, Indonesian President Sukarno announced a 'Year of Dangerous Living' as a part of his country's Independence Day celebrations. To reinforce his point, Sukarno had ordered that a force of Indonesian troops and exiled Malaysian-Chinese land in mainland Malaysia to kick off a campaign of such invasions to create guerrilla bases in enemy territory and stir up Communist sympathizers. The effort was a failure, as targeted Malaysians proved unreceptive to Indonesian efforts and the invaders were swiftly rounded up by Anglo-Malaysian security forces.

The landing shocked the British, who had not expected such a strong and prominent step from the Indonesians, but did not incite them to respond to Sukarno's escalation of tensions. The absence of violent reply stiffened Sukarno's burgeoning resolve, and led him to continue with more landings, amphibious and airborne, throughout the fall and winter of 1964.

== Origins ==
During the celebrations of Indonesia's independence from the Netherlands on 17 August 1964, President of Indonesia Sukarno declared that the year to come would be a 'Year of Dangerous Living.' This was meant to signal his intent upon stepping up the ongoing Confrontation with Malaysia so much as to toe the line of a powerful Anglo-Malaysian military response. Unbeknownst to his people or the Malaysians and their allies, however, Sukarno meant to follow through with his statement, and had planned a series of air and seaborne attacks against the Malaysian peninsula, an overtly aggressive act in what had been so far a conflict contained to northern Borneo. Though this was a risky move, it had a chance of capitalizing upon recent unrest in Malaya and Singapore by putting Indonesian soldiers and sympathizers inside Malaysian territory, where they could attempt to raise the populace against a very new government to whom they owed little loyalty.

== Landings ==
Sukarno planned to begin his 'Year of Dangerous Living' immediately, starting with an amphibious landing that very night (17 August) by Indonesian paratroops and Malaysian-Chinese exiles, who served as guides. Their mission was twofold: the Indonesians were to establish a guerrilla base and begin to recruit and train locals in that style of warfare, whilst the others would commit acts of sabotage and carry out assassinations. The former would establish a foothold for later raids into Malaysian territory as well as attempt to create unrest among the population against the government and the British, and the latter would increase the threat of that Indonesian presence so as to exacerbate internal stresses there. The Indonesians also hoped that the cover of the immense mangrove swamps would conceal the arrival of their intruders.

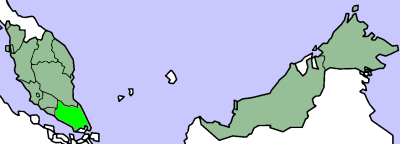
The landings took place in the Pontian District, on the west coast of the Malaysian state of Johor, highlighted on the map above.

The landings were carried out as planned, with the troops being secretly landed in three locations along the Pontian coast during the night of 17 August. From there, however, Indonesian plans went quickly astray. The local populace proved extremely unreceptive to the Indonesian incursion, and before they could begin to set up any sort of toehold and provisional government, Malaysian security forces began to arrive on the scene. A number of units were deployed by the Malaysian government, including a company of the Royal Malay Regiment, a reconnaissance regiment, and a squadron of the Senoi Praaq jungle police, who would prove important in rounding up future landings. Half of the raiders were captured immediately upon landing, and as the Malaysians cordoned off an area with a radius of 200 miles surrounding Pontian, it became simply a mopping-up operation to apprehend the others. The Senoi Praaq would be instrumental in this process, proving adept at catching Indonesian intruders while they broke cover to obtain food from Malaysian villagers, as well as following their tracks through the jungle. The perimeter was quickly shrunk to one of only an 8-mile radius as tighter checkpoints were established and security units swept the area, and Indonesian resistance quickly collapsed. All but four were captured or killed in this effort (the vast majority captured).

== Aftermath ==
The landings at Pontian, though small in scale, and unsuccessful in nature, caused a huge political crisis for Britain. The Malaysian government was infuriated, and accused the Indonesians of "blatant aggression," threatening to strike (through Britain) at their bases in Sumatra, simultaneously putting immense pressure on London to act. Though Sukarno had suffered a minor defeat, he had still managed to put the British in an extremely awkward position: if they did not retaliate, they would be seen to have lost face and to lack enough resolve to risk escalating the crisis. Retaliation, however, might bring the Confrontation towards open war, which the British were understandably unwilling to consider. The debate whether or not to act raged on in Cabinet backrooms. Lord Anthony Head proved an influential voice in the conversation, stating that interrogation had shown that more raids were impending, which would stretch British forces between the Malaysian Peninsula and Borneo, forcing an unwanted reinforcement of Southeast Asia. Head advocated preventative strikes against Indonesian bases should another raid occur.

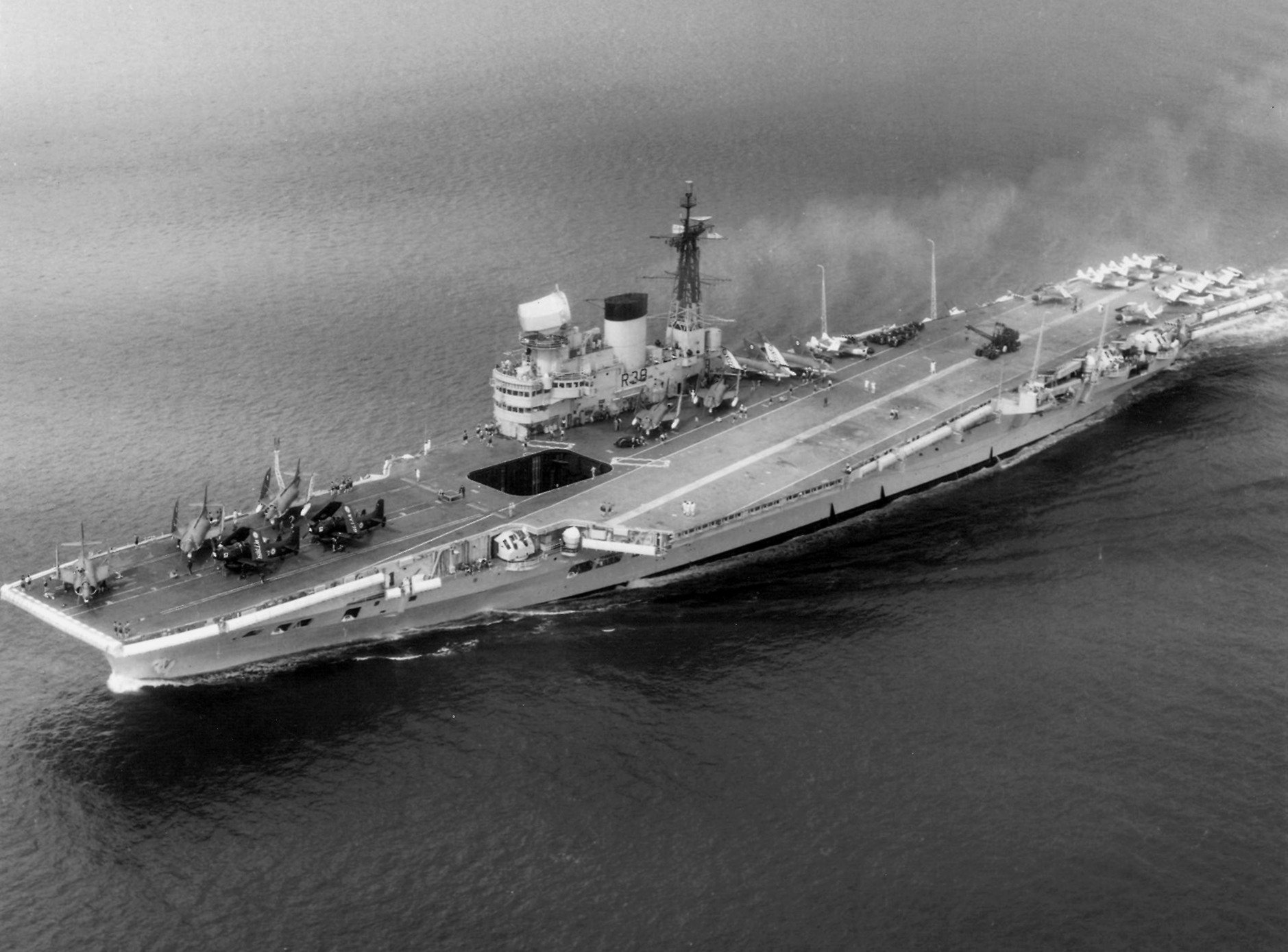
HMS Victorious, central to the Sunda Straits Crisis of 1964.

Before the British could decide upon a policy, however, Sukarno struck again, making an airborne assault Labis in the night of 1–2 September. Though the raid was a catastrophic failure, with one of the transport planes crashing en route, and the remainder of the troops arriving scattered with little food and battered morale, the move further infuriated the Malaysians, who in turn put pressure upon the British to act. The next day, colonial secretary Duncan Sandys authorized on-site naval commander Admiral Varyl Begg to plan for strikes against Indonesian bases in Sumatra. The British plans for retaliation were pre-empted once again, but this time by an act of their own. On August 27, the aircraft carrier HMS Victorious had sailed through the Sunda Straits without proper permission being gained from Indonesian authorities. The Indonesians, who feared that the British were attempting to provoke them into attacking the carrier as the Americans had the Vietnamese during the Gulf of Tonkin incident that had occurred earlier that month, were incensed. Indonesian Foreign Minister Subandrio barred Victorious return passage through the Strait on 2 September, posing a direct challenge to the British. Officials in London determined that the challenge had to be met, and that Victorious should return through the way it came. This stance, however, met important opposition. Washington did not want to be dragged into a military action due to the British overreaching themselves. And even more importantly, Begg himself opposed the passage, due to the inability of Victorious to defend herself in the Strait. What became known as the Sunda Straits Crisis was peacefully resolved, after several weeks of tension, by the Indonesians offering London another strait to pass through at Lombok, that gave the Allies an out from war, and Jakarta a passage that could be easily screened by their warships. By this time, tensions were beginning to wind to a close, though more landings were attempted that December, as both sides seemed to recognize the disadvantage of fully escalating the Confrontation through any greater action.

== Sources ==
- Easter, David (2012). Britain and the Confrontation with Indonesia, 1960–66. I.B.Tauris. ISBN 978-0857721150.
- Freeman, Donald (2003). Straits of Malacca: Gateway Or Gauntlet?. McGill-Queen's Press – MQUP. ISBN 9780773525153.
- Jumper, Roy Davis Linville (2001). Death Waits in the "dark": The Senoi Praaq, Malaysia's Killer Elite. Greenwood Publishing Group. ISBN 9780313315152.
- Lim, Cheng Leng; Lee, Khor Eng (2016). Waging an Unwinnable War: The Communist Insurgency in Malaysia (1948–1989). Xlibris Corporation. ISBN 9781524518639.
- Toh, Boon Kwan (2005). "Brinkmanship and Deterrence Success during the Anglo-Indonesian Sunda Straits Crisis, 1964–1966". Journal of Southeast Asian Studies. 36 (3): 399–417. doi:10.1017/S0022463405000226. JSTOR 20072668. S2CID 153761938.
- Tuck, Christopher (2016). Confrontation, Strategy and War Termination: Britain's Conflict with Indonesia. Routledge. ISBN 9781317162100.
