= Percy Feilding =

British Army general (1827–1904)

General Sir Percy Feilding KCB
- Born: 26 June 1827
- Died: 9 January 1904 (aged 76)
- Military career
- Allegiance: United Kingdom
- Branch: British Army
- Rank: General
- Commands: South-Eastern District
- Conflicts: Crimean War
- Awards: Knight Commander of the Order of the Bath

General Sir Percy Robert Basil Feilding KCB (26 June 1827 – 9 January 1904) was a British Army officer.

== Military career ==
Born the son of William Feilding, 7th Earl of Denbigh, Feilding was commissioned as an ensign in the 85th Regiment of Foot (Bucks Volunteers) but transferred shortly afterwards to the Coldstream Guards. He fought in the Crimean War and was appointed a Knight, 5th class of the Order of the Medjidie in March 1858. He became Commander of the Infantry Brigade at Malta in January 1879 and General Officer Commanding South-Eastern District in April 1885.

He was appointed Colonel of the Suffolk Regiment on 25 January 1900, and served as such until his death.

== Personal life ==
On 29 April 1862, he married Lady Louisa Isabella Harriet Thynne (1834 – 26 June 1919), daughter of Henry Thynne, 3rd Marquess of Bath. They had six children.

He lived at Broome Park in Betchworth and later at his family home of Sturford House, Warminster, he also resided at 107 Queen's Gate, South Kensington, when he was in London.

Military offices
Preceded by Edward Newdegate	GOC South-Eastern District; 1885–1887	Succeeded by Alexander Montgomery Moore
Honorary titles
Preceded by General John Maxwell Perceval	Colonel of the Suffolk Regiment; 1900–1904	Succeeded by Lt.-Gen. Hon. Bernard Matthew Ward
