= Alfred Horsford =

British Army general

General Sir Alfred Horsford GCB
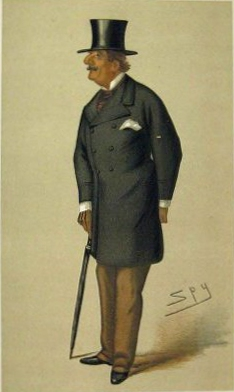
- "The Beau ideal" Horsford as caricatured by Spy in Vanity Fair, February 1877
- Born: 3 April 1816; Bath, Somerset
- Died: 13 September 1885; Munlochy, Scotland
- Military career
- Allegiance: United Kingdom
- Branch: British Army
- Service years: 1833–1880
- Rank: General
- Commands: South-Eastern District
- Conflicts: Xhosa Wars; Crimean War
- Awards: Knight Grand Cross of the Order of the Bath

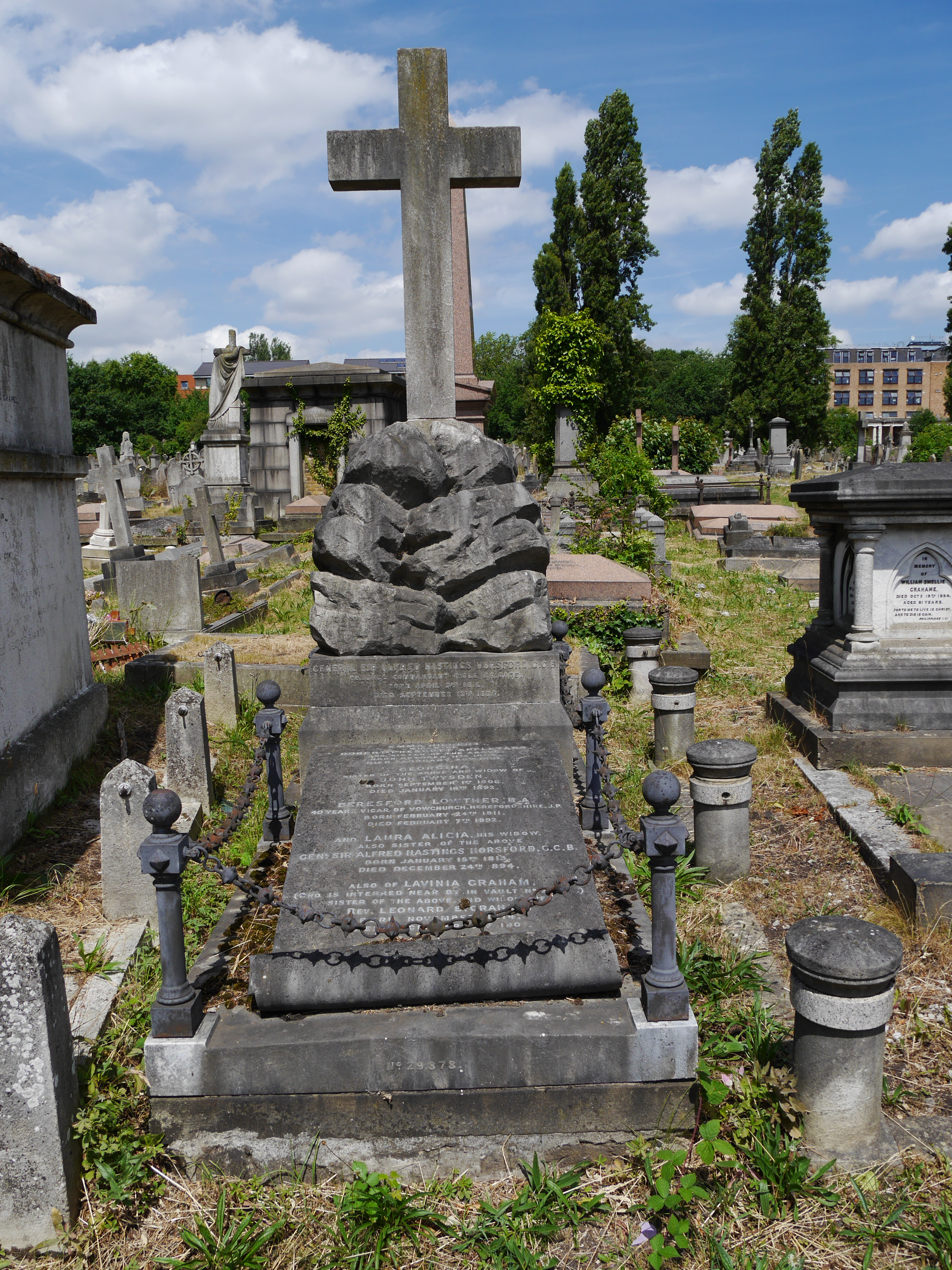
Monument, Kensal Green Cemetery

General Sir Alfred Hastings Horsford GCB (3 April 1816 – 13 September 1885) was a senior British Army officer who served as military secretary.

== Military career ==
Horsford was born in Bath, the son of Maj.-Gen. George Horsford and Mary Ann Brocksopp. He was educated at the Royal Military College, Sandhurst and commissioned into the Rifle Brigade in 1833.

He served in the Cape Frontier War in 1847 and was commanding officer of 1st Bn the Rifle Brigade during the 8th Xhosa War in 1852.

He also served in the Crimean War and fought at the Battle of Alma, Battle of Inkerman, Battle of Balaklava and the early part of the Siege of Sevastopol.

He served in the repression of the Indian Mutiny, having been made commander of the 6th Brigade at the Capture of Lucknow.

He was made deputy adjutant-general at Army Headquarters in 1860, a brigade commander at Aldershot in 1866, major-general on the general staff at Malta in 1869 and general officer commanding South-Eastern District in January 1872. He went on to be military secretary in 1874.

In retirement he was involved in an accident when Frederick Gye, manager of the Royal Italian Opera, was assisting Horsford over a fence. Horsford's gun went off and shot Gye in the eye.

Military offices
Preceded by Sir David Russell	GOC South-Eastern District; 1872–1874	Succeeded by William Parke
Preceded by Caledon Egerton	Military Secretary; 1874–1880	Succeeded by Sir Edmund Whitmore
Honorary titles
Preceded by Sir Charles Yorke	Colonel-Commandant of the 2nd Battalion, The Prince Consort's Own (Rifle Brigade); 1880–1885	Succeeded by Sir William Norcott
Preceded by James Webber Smith	Colonel of The 14th (Buckinghamshire) Prince of Wales's Own Regiment; 1879–1880	Succeeded by Alfred Thomas Heyland
Preceded by Henry Cooper	Colonel of the 79th Regiment of Foot (Cameron Highlanders); 1876–1879	Succeeded by John Douglas
