= William Parke (British Army officer) =

British Army officer

General Sir William Parke KCB
- Born: 17 May 1822; Marylebone, London, England
- Died: 29 March 1897 (aged 74); Stalbridge, Dorset, England
- Military career
- Allegiance: United Kingdom
- Branch: British Army
- Rank: General
- Commands: South-Eastern District
- Conflicts: Crimean War
- Awards: Knight Commander of the Order of the Bath

General Sir William Parke KCB (17 May 1822 – 29 March 1897) was a British Army officer.

== Early life ==
Parke was born in Marylebone, London on 17 May 1822, the son of Charles Parke. He was educated at Eton College.

== Military career ==
Parke was commissioned as an ensign in the 72nd Regiment, Duke of Albany's Own Highlanders on 15 December 1840. He fought in the Crimean War and was appointed a Knight of the Legion of Honour in August 1856. He was also awarded the Order of the Medjidie 5th class. He became Brigadier-General of Field Forces in India in March 1858, Commandant, School of Military Engineering at Fleetwood in August 1861, and colonel on the staff of South-Eastern District in October 1871. He went on to be Brigadier-General at Aldershot in July 1872, and General Officer Commanding South-Eastern District in October 1874.

== Later life ==
Parke died aged 74 on 28 March 1897 at Thornhill, Stalbridge, Dorset.

== Family ==
In 1865 Parke married Anna Maria Nepean, daughter of William Nepean of the 16th Light Dragoons and his wife Emilia Yorke. They had a son and a daughter. His daughter, Dorothy Eden Parke married Somerset Sherston in 1911 and bought Otley Hall where their son Edric Sherston was born. Somerset Sherston was killed in the Battle of Aubers (9 May 1915), and Dorothy and Edric became active members of the British Union of Fascists and were interned at the outbreak of the Second World War. Both however later rejected fascism and Dorothy returned to Otley Hall where she lived until her death on 9 July 1950.

Military offices
Preceded by Sir Alfred Horsford	GOC South-Eastern District; 1874–1877	Succeeded by Lord Alexander Russell
