= Robert Christopher Mansel =

British Army officer

Lieutenant-General Robert Christopher Mansel KH
- Born: 12 February 1789
- Died: 8 April 1864 (aged 75)
- Military career
- Allegiance: United Kingdom
- Branch: British Army
- Rank: Lieutenant-General
- Commands: South-Eastern District
- Conflicts: Peninsular War; Young Irelander Rebellion
- Awards: Knight Commander of the Royal Guelphic Order

Lieutenant-General Robert Christopher Mansel KH (12 February 1789 – 8 April 1864) was a British Army officer.

== Military career ==
Born the son of Sir William Mansel, 9th Baronet, Mansel was commissioned as an ensign in the 10th (North Lincoln) Regiment of Foot on 29 January 1807. He fought at the Battle of Toulouse in April 1814, where he was severely wounded, during the Peninsular War and was deployed to Ireland in 1848 during the Young Irelander Rebellion. He became General Officer Commanding South-Eastern District in 1857.

He also served as colonel of the 68th (Durham) Regiment of Foot (Light Infantry) from 4 June 1857 until his death.

Military offices
| Preceded by Sir Frederick Love | GOC South-Eastern District; 1857–1861 | Succeeded by Arthur Dalzell |
