= James Reynett =

British Army general

General Sir James Reynett KCB KCH
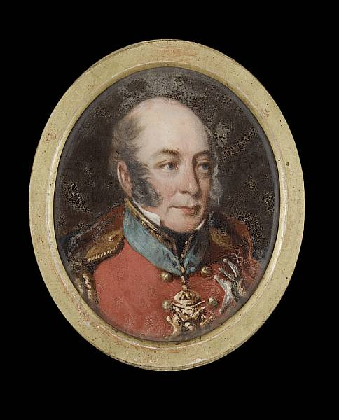
- Born: 1786; Ireland
- Died: 9 August 1864 (aged 77–78)
- Military career
- Allegiance: United Kingdom
- Branch: British Army
- Rank: General
- Conflicts: War of the Second Coalition; Peninsular War
- Awards: Knight Commander of the Order of the Bath; Knight Commander of the Royal Guelphic Order

General Sir James Henry Reynett KCB KCH (1786 – 9 August 1864) was a British Army officer who became Lieutenant Governor of Jersey.

Reynett was born in Ireland in 1786, the son of Rev. James Henry Reynett, who was twice Mayor of Waterford. His family were descended from Henri de Renêt, a Huguenot from Languedoc who found exile in Ireland in 1688, on the revocation of the Edict of Nantes.

== Military career ==
Reynett took part in the Ferrol Expedition in 1800 during the War of the Second Coalition and was appointed Deputy Assistant Quartermaster-General in 1808 during the Peninsular War. He went on to become Assistant Quartermaster-General in Germany in 1813 and military secretary to the Duke of Cambridge in 1820 before being made Inspector of Foreign outpatients at Chelsea Hospital later in 1820.

He was appointed a Groom of the Bedchamber to William IV in 1831, serving in the royal household until the accession of Queen Victoria in 1837.

Reynett served as Lieutenant Governor of Jersey from 1847 to 1852. He was also Colonel of the 48th Regiment of Foot from 1850 to his death.

He was promoted General on 5 May 1860.

== Family ==
In 1837 he married Eliza Campbell at Hampton Court Palace. He died at the Banqueting House, Hampton Court Palace in 1864.

Government offices
Preceded by Sir Edward Gibbs	Lieutenant Governor of Jersey; 1847–1852	Succeeded by Sir Frederick Love
