= Henry Hallam Parr =

English army officer

Major-General Sir Henry Hallam Parr KCB CMG
- Born: 24 July 1847
- Died: 4 April 1914 (aged 66)
- Military career
- Allegiance: United Kingdom
- Branch: British Army
- Service years: 1865–1903
- Rank: Major-General
- Commands: North-Western District
- Conflicts: Anglo-Zulu War; First Boer War; Anglo-Egyptian War; Mahdist War
- Awards: Knight Commander of the Order of the Bath; Companion of the Order of St Michael and St George

Major-General Sir Henry Hallam Parr KCB CMG (24 July 1847 – 4 April 1914) was a British Army officer who became General Officer Commanding North-Western District.

== Military career ==
Educated at Twyford School, Hallam Parr was commissioned as an ensign in the 13th Regiment of Foot on 8 September 1865. He fought in the Anglo-Zulu War in 1879, in the First Boer War in 1881 and in the Anglo-Egyptian War in 1882. He also saw action at the Battle of Tamai in March 1884 and took part in the Nile Expedition later that year during the Mahdist War. He served as adjutant-general to Lord Grenfell, in his capacity as Sirdar of the Egyptian Army, in the late 1880s. He became Commander, Shorncliffe Garrison, in July 1898, General Officer Commanding South-Eastern District in October 1899 and General Officer Commanding North-Western District in May 1902; he retired in November 1903.

He was colonel of the Somerset Light Infantry from May 1910 until his death in 1914.

== Works ==
- Parr, Henry Hallam (2008). Major-General Sir Henry Hallam Parr: Recollections and Correspondence. Kessinger Publishing. ISBN 978-1437131970.

Military offices
Preceded by Leslie Rundle	GOC South-Eastern District; 1899–1902	Succeeded by Leslie Rundle
Preceded by Leopold Swaine	GOC North-Western District; 1902–1903	Succeeded by Francis Howard
