= Leopold Swaine =

Major-General Sir Leopold Swaine KCB CMG
- Born: 15 December 1840
- Died: 13 March 1931 (aged 90)
- Military career
- Allegiance: United Kingdom
- Branch: British Army
- Rank: Major-General
- Commands: North-Western military district
- Conflicts: Anglo-Egyptian War
- Awards: Knight Commander of the Order of the Bath; Companion of the Order of St Michael and St George

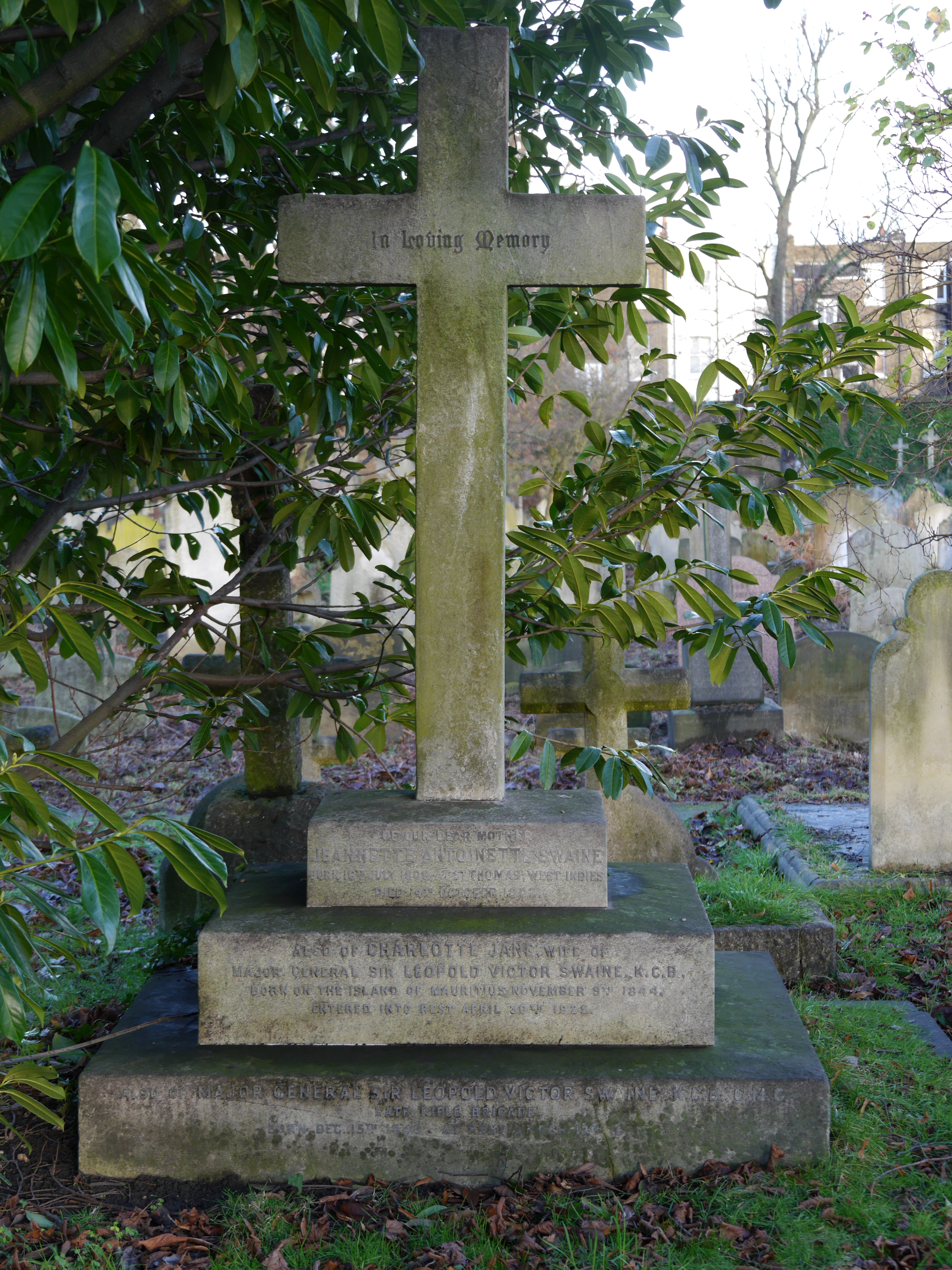
Funerary monument, Brompton Cemetery, London

Major-General Sir Leopold Victor Swaine KCB CMG (15 December 1840 – 13 March 1931) was a British Army officer, military attaché at Berlin and Lord Wolseley's military secretary during the Anglo-Egyptian War.

== Military career ==
Swaine's godfather was the King of Belgium. He joined the Rifle Brigade as an Ensign on 24 July 1859, rising to Lieutenant on 16 August 1864. He was later military attaché at Berlin and Lord Wolseley's military secretary during the Anglo-Egyptian War. He held the command of the North-Western military district (at Chester) from 1896 until May 1902, and retired from the army in December the same year.

Swaine died on 13 March 1931. He is buried in Brompton Cemetery, London. Two 1861 photographs by Camille Silvy are held by the National Portrait Gallery, London.

Military offices
Preceded by Baker Russell	GOC North Western District; 1896–1902	Succeeded by Henry Hallam Parr
