= Godfrey Mundy =

Major-General Godfrey Mundy
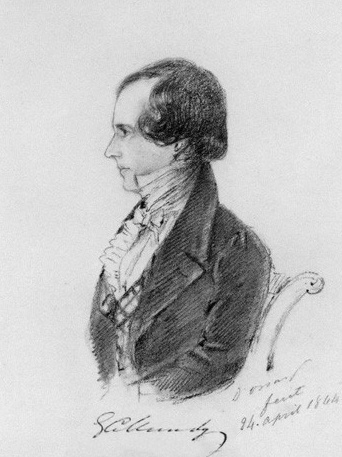
- Born: 10 March 1804
- Died: 10 July 1860 (aged 56)
- Military career
- Allegiance: United Kingdom
- Branch: British Army
- Service years: 1821–1860
- Rank: Major-General
- Conflicts: Crimean War

Major-General Godfrey Charles Mundy (10 March 1804 – 10 July 1860) was a British Army officer who became Lieutenant Governor of Jersey.

== Military career ==
Mundy was commissioned as a lieutenant in the British Army in 1821. He took part in the Siege of Bharatpur in the Indian princely state of Baharatpur in 1825 before being made Deputy Adjutant General of the military forces in Australia in 1826. He was appointed Assistant Under Secretary at the Colonial Office from March to September 1854. He served as Permanent Under Secretary in the War Office during the Crimean War and was appointed Lieutenant Governor of Jersey in 1857. He died in office in 1860. He was author of the book Our Antipodes: or, Residence and Rambles in the Australasian Colonies, with a glimpse of the Gold-Fields.

== Family ==
In 1848 he married Lady Louisa Catherine Georgina Herbert; they had one son, Herbert Godfrey Mundy.

Government offices
Preceded by Sir Frederick Love	Lieutenant Governor of Jersey; 1857–1860	Succeeded by Sir Robert Douglas
