= Richard Trant =

British Army general

General Sir Richard Trant KCB DL
- Born: Richard Brooking Trant; 30 March 1928; Thurlestone, England
- Died: 3 October 2007 (aged 79)
- Military career
- Allegiance: United Kingdom
- Branch: British Army
- Service years: 1947–1986
- Rank: General
- Nickname: "Dick"
- Commands: 3rd Regiment Royal Horse Artillery; 5th Airportable Brigade; South East District
- Conflicts: Korean War; Falklands War; The Troubles; Aden
- Awards: Knight Commander of the Order of the Bath
- Other work: Commissioner at the Royal Hospital Chelsea; Chairman of the Cornwall Heritage Trust; Chairman of the Devon and Cornwall Historic Society; President of the Royal Cornwall Show

General Sir Richard Brooking Trant, KCB, DL (30 March 1928 – 3 October 2007) was an officer in the British Army. He was Land Deputy Commander in the Falklands War, and served as Quartermaster-General to the Forces from 1983 to 1986.

== Military career ==
Trant was born in Thurlestone in south Devon and educated at Newquay Grammar School. He attended the Bangalore Officer Training School in 1947, receiving an emergency commission in the Duke of Cornwall's Light Infantry. He transferred to a regular commission in the Royal Regiment of Artillery in 1949, and served with anti-aircraft units in the United Kingdom. He joined the 32nd Medium Regiment in Hong Kong in 1952, and served in the Korean War with 74th Medium Battery in 1953.

He returned to Europe in 1957, joining A Battery (The Chestnut Troop) of the 1st Regiment Royal Horse Artillery, serving with the British Army of the Rhine. He was posted back to India in 1961, to study at the Indian Army Staff College in Wellington Cantonment, and then served as GSO 2 to the Federal Regular Army in Aden Protectorate. He returned to England in 1964, to study at the Joint Services Staff College. He commanded C Battery of 3rd Regiment Royal Horse Artillery, and then became an instructor at the Staff College, Camberley. He took command of 3RHA, and after another year at Camberley as Colonel GS of the Staff College Division, he became commander of the 5th Airportable Brigade in 1972, when the unit was temporarily sent to Northern Ireland, to reinforce British forces at the height of the Troubles.

He was Deputy Military Secretary in the Ministry of Defence for two-year before being promoted to Major General and appointed Command Land Forces in Northern Ireland, Operation Banner, in 1977. Earl Mountbatten of Burma was killed just after Trant left to become Director Army Staff Duties in the Ministry of Defence. During this period, the Army, in common with the other British armed forces, faced significant cuts in funding following the Defence Review conducted by Secretary of State for Defence John Nott in 1981.

He was promoted to Lieutenant General in 1982, and became GOC South East District, taking charge of the British Army's rapid reaction forces for operations outside the NATO area shortly before Argentina invaded the Falkland Islands. He succeeded Royal Marines Major General Jeremy Moore as adviser to the overall commander, Admiral Sir John Fieldhouse, based at Northwood, when Moore flew south to become overall commander of British land forces in theatre.

Promoted to Full General, Trant became Quartermaster-General in 1983, succeeding Sir Paul Travers, and joined the Army Board.

He became a Freeman of the City of London in 1984, and retired from the Army in 1986. He became a senior military adviser to Belfast aircraft manufacturer Short Brothers, later joining the boards of Hunting Engineering and Wilson Hogg Robinson. He was vice-president of the Defence Manufacturers' Association from 1989 to 1996.

He was colonel commandant of the Royal Army Educational Corps from 1979 to 1982, of the Royal Regiment of Artillery from 1982 to 1987, of the Royal Army Ordnance Corps from 1984 to 1989, and of Honourable Artillery Company, and also honorary colonel of 3rd Regiment Royal Horse Artillery. He was also a commissioner at the Royal Hospital Chelsea for 6 years. He served as a Deputy Lieutenant of Cornwall from 1997, and was also a Cornish bard, Chairman of the Cornwall Heritage Trust for 14 years, chairman of the Devon and Cornwall Historic Society, Patron of St Bartholomew's church in Lostwithiel, and president of the Royal Cornwall Show in 2004.

Trant was appointed a Companion of the Order of the Bath (CB) in the 1979 New Year Honours, and promoted to Knight Commander of the Order (KCB) in the 1982 Birthday Honours.

Trant married, Diana Clare Edwards (known as "Tink"), in 1957. They had a son and two daughters. He was survived by his wife and their three children.

Military offices
Preceded by Sir Paul Travers	GOC South East District; 1982–1983	Succeeded by Sir Geoffrey Howlett
Preceded by Sir Paul Travers	Quartermaster-General to the Forces; 1983–1986	Succeeded by Sir Charles Huxtable
Preceded by Sir Victor FitzGeorge-Balfour	Colonel Commandant and President, Honourable Artillery Company; 1984–1992	Succeeded by Sir Michael Wilkes
