= Leslie Rundle =

British Army general (1856–1934)

General Sir Leslie Rundle GCB GCMG GCVO DSO
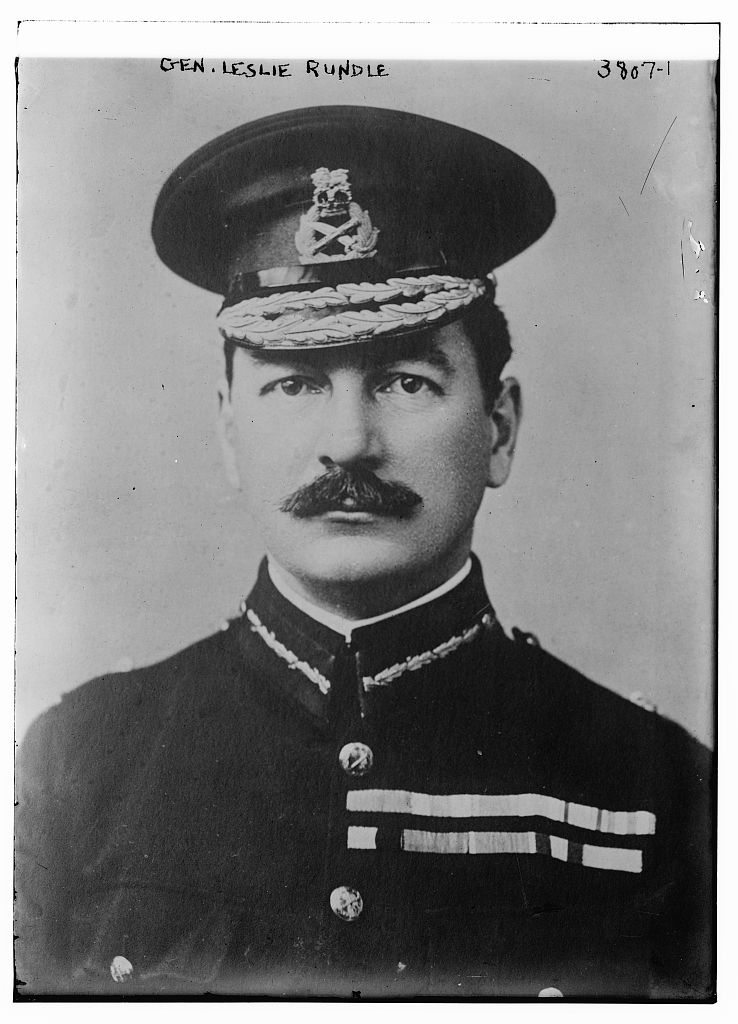
- Rundle in 1916
- Born: Henry Macleod Leslie Rundle; 6 January 1856; Newton Abbot, Devon
- Died: 19 November 1934 (aged 78)
- Military career
- Allegiance: United Kingdom
- Branch: British Army
- Service years: 1876–1916
- Rank: General
- Commands: Eastern Command; Home Army; Northern Command; 5th Division; South-Eastern District
- Conflicts: Zulu War; First Boer War; Anglo-Egyptian War; Mahdist War; Second Boer War; First World War
- Awards: Knight Grand Cross of the Order of the Bath; Knight Grand Cross of the Order of St Michael and St George; Knight Grand Cross of the Royal Victorian Order; Distinguished Service Order

General Sir Henry Macleod Leslie Rundle, GCB, GCMG, GCVO, DSO (6 January 1856 – 19 November 1934) was a British Army general during the Second Boer War and the First World War.

== Early life ==
Rundle was born on 6 January 1856 in Newton Abbot, Devon. He was the son of Captain Joseph Sparkhall Rundle, a Royal Navy officer, and his wife Renira Cathrine (née Leslie, who was the daughter of Commander W. W. Leslie of the Royal Navy).

== Career ==
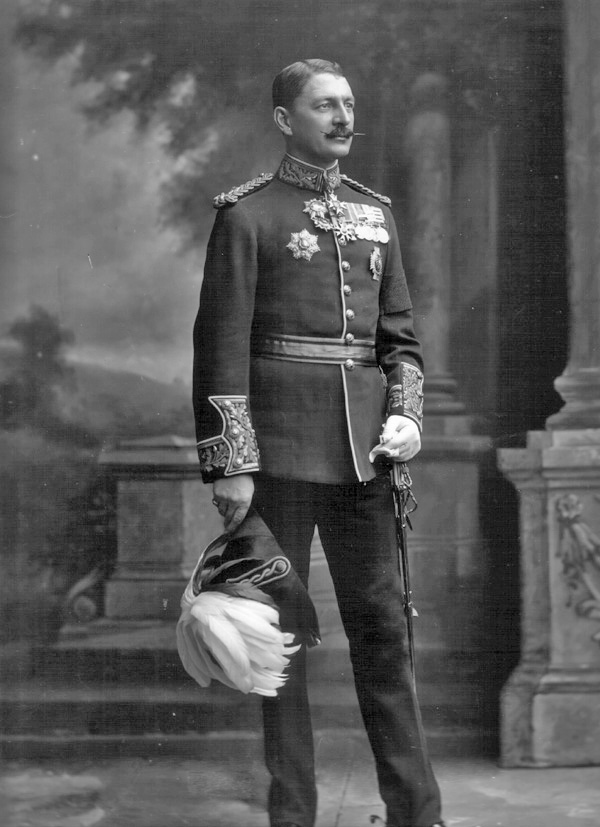
Sir Leslie, 1 March 1899

Rundle was commissioned into the Royal Artillery in 1876. He fought in the Zulu War in 1879, the First Boer War of 1881 and the Anglo-Egyptian War of 1882. He was involved in the Nile expedition between 1884 and 1885 and served in the Sudan Frontier Field Force from 1885 to 1887. For service in the Khartoum expedition of 1898 he was promoted to major-general for distinguished conduct in the field. He led a column up the Blue Nile to relieve Gedaref the same year.

Rundle became general officer commanding, South-Eastern District on 29 December 1898. He was appointed Honorary Colonel of the 3rd (East Kent Militia) Battalion, Buffs (East Kent Regiment) on 21 June 1899.

After the escalation of the Second Boer War in late 1899, Rundle was in January 1900 appointed to the command of the 8th Division of the South African Field Force, with the temporary and local rank of lieutenant general. The appointment was described as "the most remarkable instance of advancement to high military office which has occurred in the recent history of [the] Army" by a contemporary issue of The Times. He left Southampton in the SS Moor in March 1900 with the staff of the 8th Division and 600 men of militia regiments, and arrived in Cape Town the following month. He served as commander until early March 1902, when he returned to the United Kingdom on board the SS Carisbrook Castle. For his service in the war, he was mentioned in despatches (including by Major General Lord Kitchener on 23 June 1902) and appointed a Knight Commander of the Order of St Michael and St George (KCMG) (the award was dated 29 November 1900 in the gazette, but he was only invested by King Edward VII after his return, at St James's Palace on 2 June 1902).

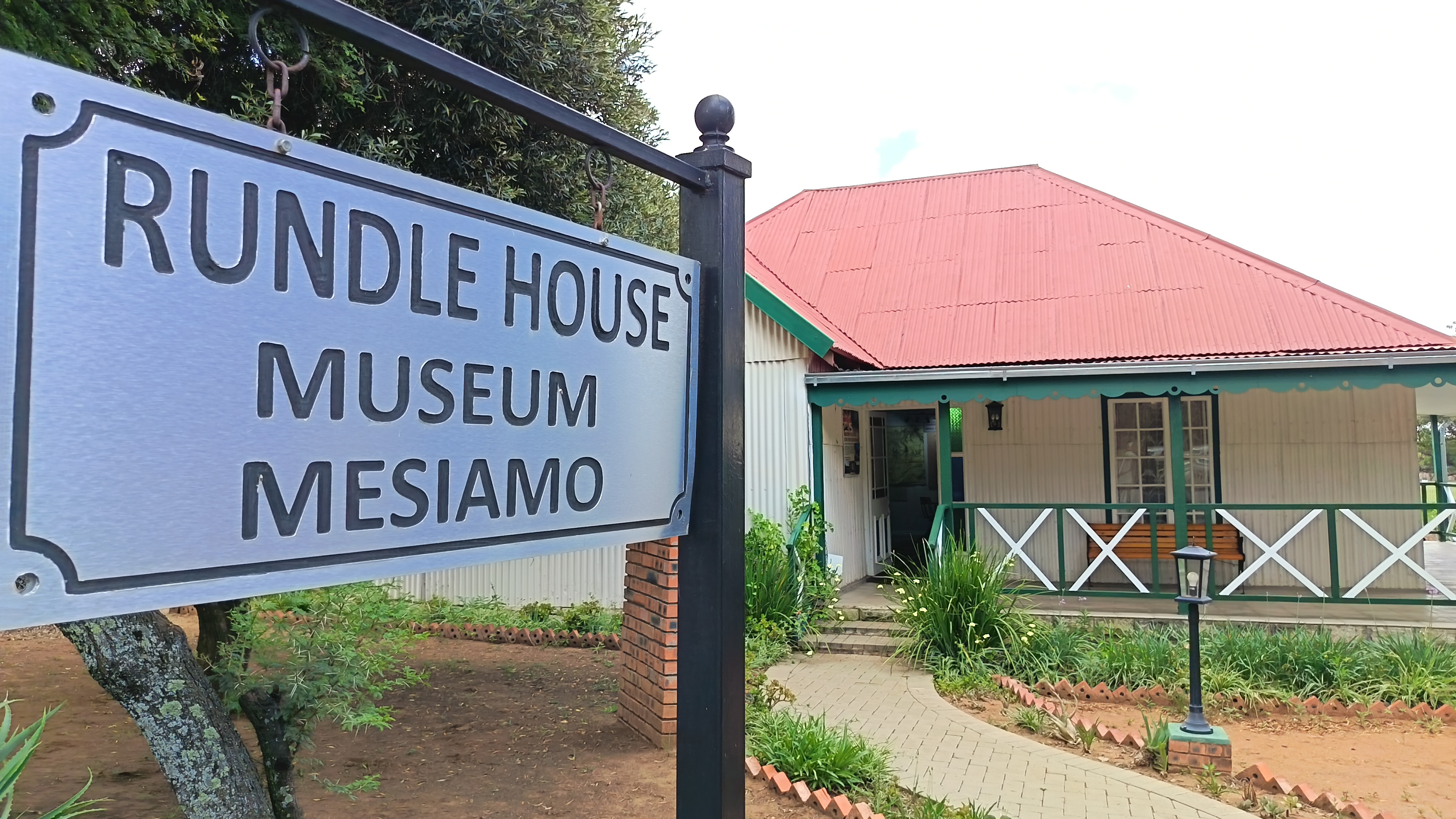
Rundle House Museum at the War Museum 2025, Bloemfontein.

Following his return, he was in May 1902 back as general officer commanding (GOC) of South-Eastern District, based in Dover, and was on 14 May 1902 appointed in command of the 5th Division, which was stationed there.

He became a major general on the staff to become GOC North Eastern District on 10 November 1903, General Officer Commanding-in-Chief of Northern Command in 1905 and Governor and Commander-in-Chief of Malta in 1909. He was promoted to lieutenant general on 3 April 1905 and to general in September 1909. He went on to be General Officer Commanding-in-Chief of Eastern Command in 1915 and finally retired frlm the army in May 1919.

Rundle was presented with the Freedom of the borough of Dover on 29 October 1902, while living there as General Officer Commanding South-Eastern district. He was honorary treasurer of the Blue Cross Fund.

== Personal life ==
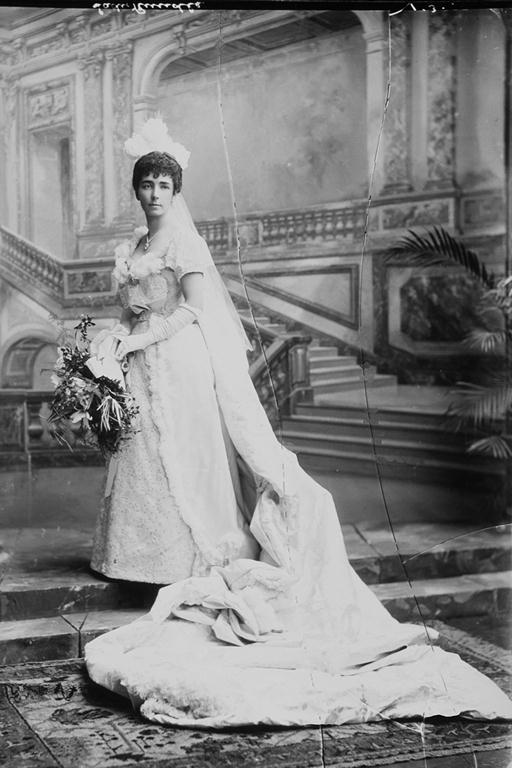
Lady Rundle presented to Princess Christian of Schleswig-Holstein at 'The Drawing Room' of 1 March 1899.

In 1887, Rundle married Eleanor Georgina Campbell, daughter of Captain H. J. M. Campbell, Royal Artillery, but they had no children.

Rundle died on 19 November 1934.

Military offices
| Preceded by Sir William Butler | GOC South-Eastern District; 1898–1899 | Succeeded by Henry Hallam Parr |
| Preceded by Henry Hallam Parr | GOC South-Eastern District; 1902–1903 | Succeeded by Post disbanded |
| Preceded by Edward Browne | GOC North Eastern District (GOC-in-C Northern Command from 1905); 1903–1907 | Succeeded by Sir Laurence Oliphant |
Government offices
| Preceded by Sir Henry Grant | Governor of Malta; 1909–1915 | Succeeded by Lord Methuen |
Military offices
| Preceded by Sir Ian Hamilton | Commander-in-Chief, Home Army; 1915 | Succeeded by Sir John French (as C-in-C Home Forces) |
| Preceded by Sir Charles Woollcombe | GOC-in-C Eastern Command; 1915–1916 | Succeeded by Sir James Wolfe Murray |
