= Paul Travers =

Lieutenant-General Sir Paul Travers KCB
- Born: 15 August 1927; Wandsworth, Greater London
- Died: 10 June 1983 (aged 55); London, England
- Military career
- Allegiance: United Kingdom
- Branch: British Army
- Service years: 1947–1983
- Rank: Lieutenant-General
- Commands: South East District
- Awards: Knight Commander of the Order of the Bath

Lieutenant-General Sir Paul Anthony Travers KCB (15 August 1927 – 10 June 1983) was a British Army officer who served as Quartermaster-General to the Forces.

== Military career ==
Travers was commissioned into the South Lancashire Regiment in 1947.

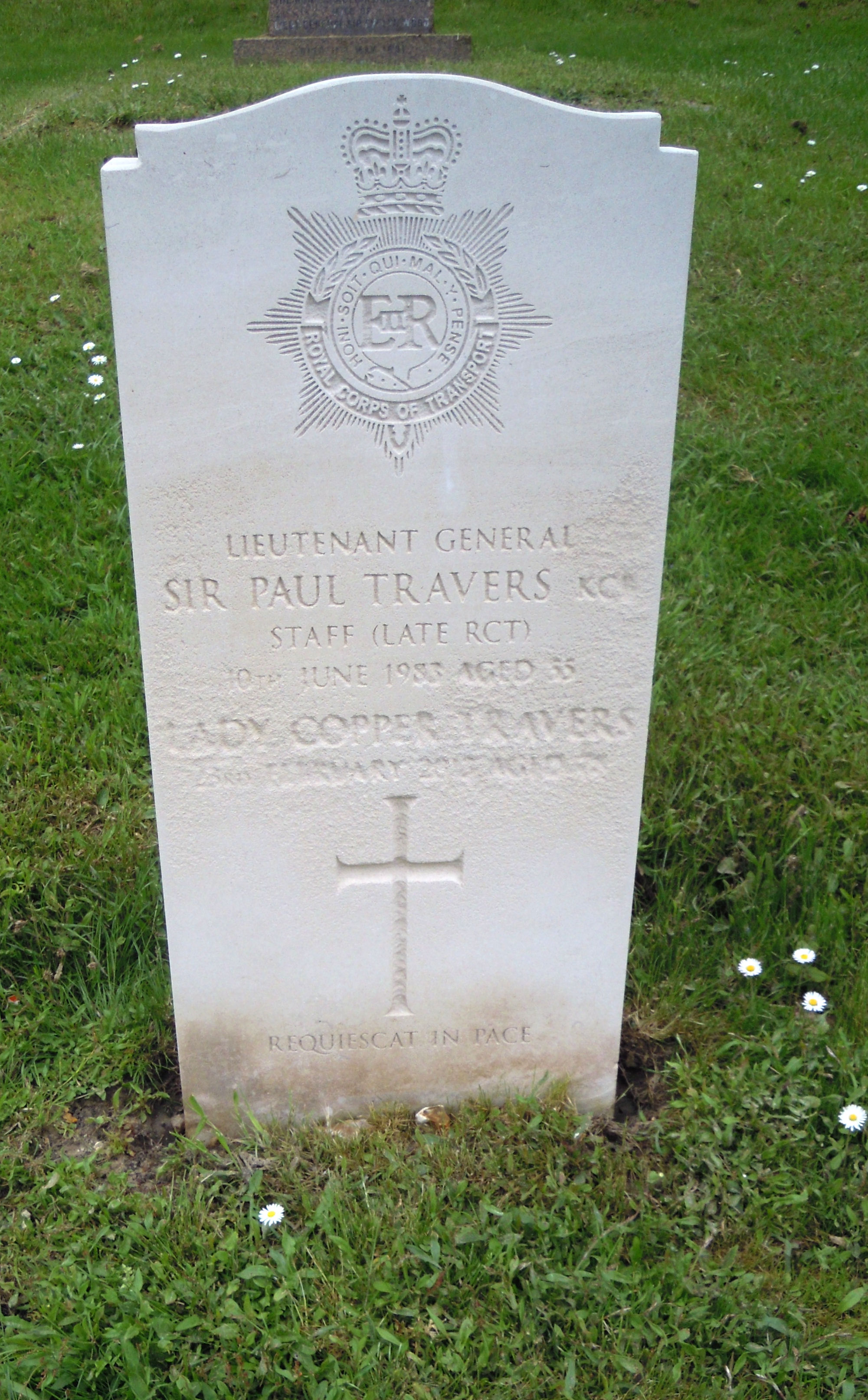
Travers' grave in Aldershot Military Cemetery

In 1978 he was selected to be Chief of Staff at the Logistics Executive before moving on, in 1979, to be Vice-Quartermaster-General. In 1981 he was appointed General Officer Commanding South East District and in 1982 he became Quartermaster-General to the Forces; he died in office in 1983. He is buried in Aldershot Military Cemetery.

He was also Colonel Commandant of the Royal Corps of Transport and the Army Legal Corps.

Travers was appointed a Knight Commander of the Order of the Bath (KCB) in the 1981 Birthday Honours.

Military offices
Preceded by Sir George Cooper	GOC South East District; 1981–1982	Succeeded by Sir Richard Trant
Preceded by Sir Richard Worsley	Quartermaster-General to the Forces; 1982–1983	Succeeded by Sir Richard Trant
