= Lord William Seymour (British Army officer) =

General Lord William Seymour KCVO
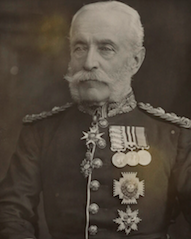
- Born: 8 December 1838
- Died: 9 February 1915 (aged 76)
- Military career
- Allegiance: United Kingdom
- Branch: British Army
- Rank: General
- Commands: British Troops in Canada (1898–1901); South-Eastern District (1891–1896)
- Conflicts: Crimean War; Anglo-Egyptian War
- Awards: Knight Commander of the Royal Victorian Order

General Lord William Frederick Ernest Seymour, KCVO (8 December 1838 – 9 February 1915), known as William Seymour until 1871, was a senior British Army officer.

== Military career ==
Born the son of Admiral Sir George Francis Seymour, Seymour served in the Crimean War in 1854 and in the Anglo-Egyptian War in 1882. He became General Officer Commanding South-Eastern District in February 1891, and Commander of the British Troops in Canada in 1898. From November 1901 to 1902, he served as acting military secretary in the absence of Ian Hamilton. He became lieutenant of the Tower of London on 1 September 1902, was promoted to full general on 25 October 1902, and retired in December 1905. He also served as Colonel-in-Chief of the Coldstream Guards from 1911 to 1915.

Military offices
Preceded by Alexander Montgomery Moore	GOC South-Eastern District; 1891–1896	Succeeded by Sir William Butler
Preceded by Alexander Montgomery Moore	Commander of the British Troops in Canada; 1898–1901	Vacant Title next held by Sir Charles Parsons
Honorary titles
Preceded by Sir Frederick Stephenson	Colonel of the Coldstream Guards; 1911–1915	Succeeded by The Viscount Falmouth
