= Robert Garrett (British Army officer) =

British Army general

Lieutenant-General Sir Robert Garrett KCB KH
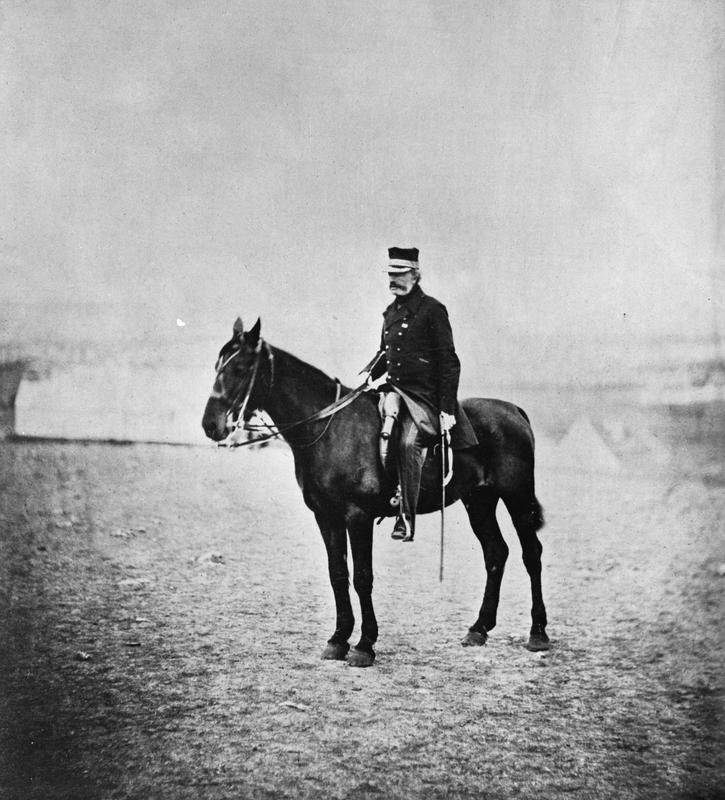
- Born: 1794; Ramsgate, Kent, England
- Died: 13 June 1869 (aged 74–75); Pall Mall, London
- Military career
- Allegiance: United Kingdom
- Branch: British Army
- Rank: Lieutenant-General
- Commands: 46th Regiment of Foot; Commander of British Troops in China and Hong Kong; South East District
- Conflicts: Peninsular War; Crimean War
- Awards: Knight Commander of the Order of the Bath; Knight Commander of the Royal Guelphic Order

Lieutenant-General Sir Robert Garrett KCB KH (1794 – 13 June 1869) was Commander of British Troops in China and Hong Kong.

== Military career ==
Garrett was born in Ramsgate, Kent, the son of John Garrett of Ellington House, Isle of Thanet, and Elizabeth Gore. Educated at Harrow School, Garrett was commissioned into the 2nd (The Queen's Royal) Regiment of Foot in 1811. He served in the Peninsular War and was present at the Battle of Fuentes de Oñoro in 1811.

In 1846 he was appointed commanding officer of the 46th Regiment of Foot and in 1854 was despatched to the Crimean War where he commanded a brigade of the 4th Division at the Siege of Sevastopol.

In 1858, he was appointed commander of British Troops in China and Hong Kong before going on to India, where he was general officer commanding a division in Bengal and then in Madras. He returned to England in July 1865 to take command of South-Eastern District.

In retirement he lived in Pall Mall in London.

He was also colonel of the 43rd Regiment of Foot.

== Family ==
In 1814, he married Charlotte Georgina Sophia Cavendish-Bentinck (1789–1819), daughter of Lord Edward Bentinck and granddaughter of the 2nd Duke of Portland. After her death, in 1821, he married widow Louisa Davaynes, with whom he had a son and a daughter.

Military offices
Preceded by William Jervois	Commander of British Troops in China and Hong Kong; 1854–1857	Succeeded by Thomas Ashburnham
Preceded by Arthur Dalzell	GOC South-Eastern District; 1865–1866	Succeeded by William McCleverty
Honorary titles
Preceded by Sir Frederick Love	Colonel of the 43rd (Monmouthshire) Regiment of Foot; 1866–1869	Succeeded by Sir Augustus Spencer
