= Landing at Labis =

1964 battle in Malaysia

- Part of the Indonesia–Malaysia confrontation
Date	September–October 1964
Location	Labis, Johore, Malaysia
Result	Commonwealth victory

Belligerents
United Kingdom; New Zealand; Malaysia	Indonesia

Strength
Unknown	98

Casualties and losses
4 killed	32 killed 62 captured

The Landing at Labis was an airborne landing by Indonesian paratroopers on 2 September 1964 near Labis, Johore, Malaysia during the Indonesia–Malaysia confrontation.

Transported in three Indonesian Air Force C-130 Hercules aircraft, which had set off from Jakarta, only two aircraft managed to reach the target drop zone, the third aircraft crashed into the Straits of Malacca while trying to evade interception by a No. 64 Squadron RAF Javelin FAW.9 launched from RAF Tengah, Singapore. Tropical storms dispersed the parachute drop around Labis, about 100 miles (160 km) north of Singapore with 98 paratroopers being inserted. The landing zone was close to the camp of the 1/10th Gurkha Rifles (1st Battalion, 10th GR, who were later joined in mopping-up operations by the 1st Battalion, Royal New Zealand Infantry Regiment (1 RNZIR) who were stationed near Malacca with the 28th Commonwealth Brigade.

Under the overall command of 4th Malaysian Infantry Brigade, operations to round up the 98 paratroopers took about a month. 1 RNZIR and 1/10th Gurkhas accounted for all but eight of the paratroopers, killing 32 and capturing 62 of the intruders at the cost of a New Zealand major killed. Patrols continued throughout the area around Labis throughout October.
