= Henry Roper =

Henry Roper may refer to:

- Henry Roper (British Army officer) (1923–1982)
- Henry Roper (priest) (died 1847), Anglican priest in Ireland
- Henry Roper (judge), English judge, chief justice of Bombay Supreme Court
- Henry Roper, 8th Baron Teynham (c. 1676–1723), English aristocrat
