= Battle of Longstop Hill =

WW2 battle in occupied Tunisia (Apr 1943)

Battle of Longstop Hill (1943)
- Part of Operation Vulcan, the Tunisian campaign
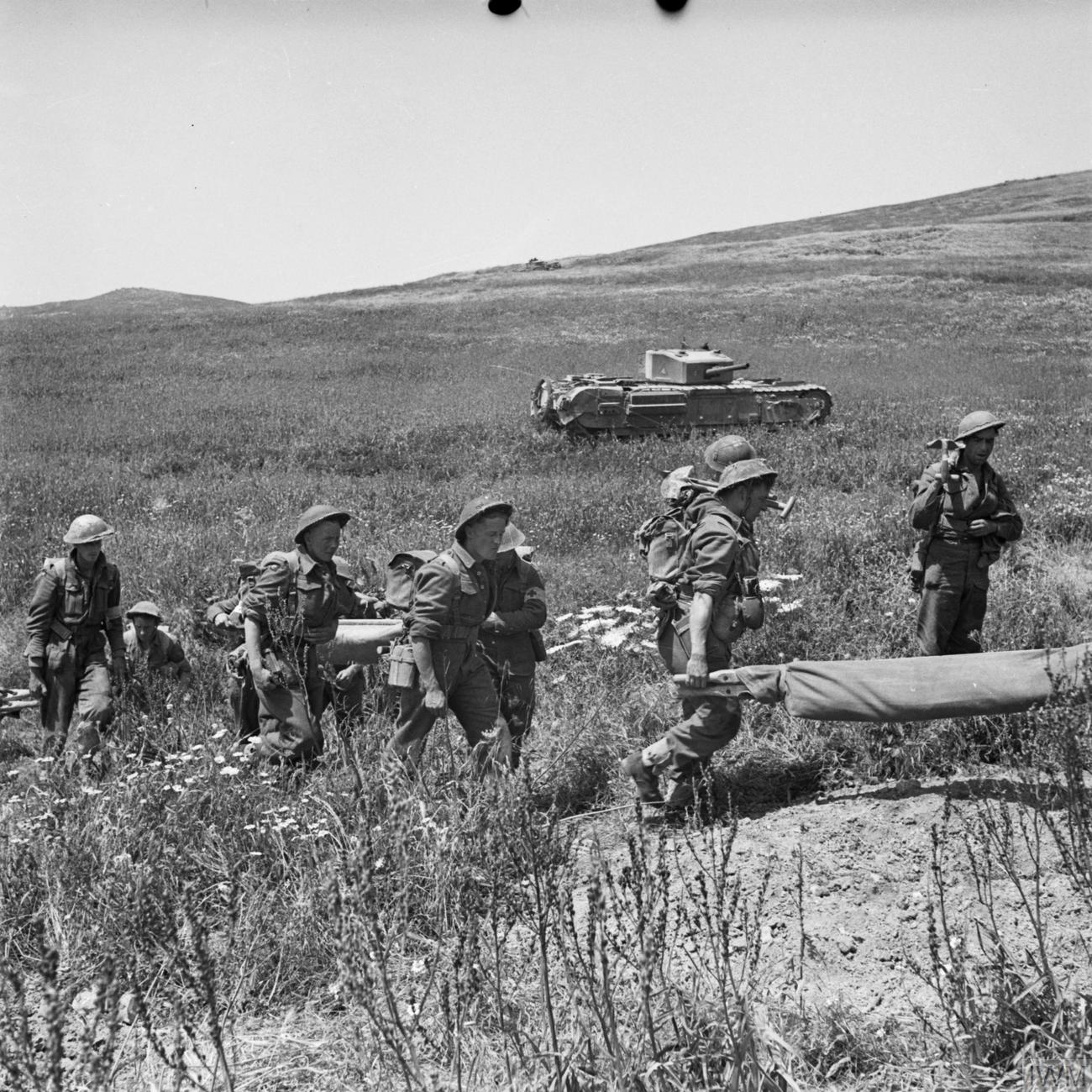
- British troops bring down wounded during the attack on Longstop Hill; a Churchill tank is in the background,
Date	21-26 April 1943
Location	Djebel el Ahmera, Djebel Rhar, Tunisia 36.7349992°N 09.6412452°E
Result	British victory

Belligerents
United Kingdom	(Nazi Germany) Germany

Commanders and leaders
(United Kingdom) Vyvyan Evelegh	(Nazi Germany) Ernst-Günther Baade

Strength
(United Kingdom) 78th Division	(Nazi Germany) 999th Light Afrika Division

Casualties and losses
Roughly 400 killed and/or wounded	Roughly 500 killed and/or wounded roughly 600 captured nonwounded

The 2nd Battle of Longstop Hill or the Capture of Longstop Hill took place in Tunisia during the Tunisia Campaign of World War II from 21 to 26 April 1943. The battle, part of Operation Vulcan, was fought for control over the heights of Djebel el Ahmera and Djebel Rhar, together known as Longstop Hill and vicinity, between the British forces of the First Army and German units of the 5th Panzer Army. The infantry of the 78th Battleaxe Division and Churchill tanks of the North Irish Horse captured Longstop Hill after bitter fighting, in which the tanks created a measure of tactical surprise by driving up the hill, a manoeuvre that only Churchill tanks could achieve. The attackers broke through the German defences, which were the last great natural barrier on the road to Tunis.

== Background ==
The Run for Tunis, an Allied effort to capture Tunis in late 1942 following Operation Torch had failed and since the end of the year, a stalemate had settled on the theatre as both sides paused to re-build their strength. The 5th Panzer Army (Hans-Jürgen von Arnim) defending Tunisia was being strengthened as was the Allied First Army (Kenneth Anderson).

In January 1943, the German-Italian Panzer Army (Erwin Rommel) confronting the Eighth Army (Bernard Montgomery) had withdrawn westwards and joined the 5th Panzer Army. Army Group Africa was formed, with the two Axis armies under command of Rommel. In March, the Army Group was defeated by the Eighth Army at the Battle of Medenine and the Battle of the Mareth Line which fell after Rommel's return to Germany. In the central west, north of Medjez el Bab and some 30 miles (48 km) from Tunis, the First Army continued to fight for the dominating, German-held peaks, in the Medjerda Valley. This included a massif with the hills known as Djebel Ahmera and Dejebel Rhar.

=== First battle ===
On the night of 22/23 December 1942, the 2nd Battalion, Coldstream Guards mounted an attack in heavy rain, capturing what they thought to be the whole massif, before being relieved by the U.S. 18th Regimental Combat Team. The Germans counter-attacked, driving the Americans off Djebel el Ahmera but the next night the Guards recaptured the hill only to find, when daylight came, that another summit, Djebel Rhar, remained to be assaulted. During the night the Guards attacked once again and captured the second hill but they were later driven off by a German counter-attack on Christmas Day. Progress towards Tunis was blocked, so the senior Allied commanders, General Dwight D. Eisenhower, the Supreme Allied Commander in North Africa, and General Sir Harold Alexander agreed that further advances were to be delayed. Thereafter the massif was known by the Allies as "Longstop Hill" and by the Germans "Der Weihnachtsberg". The name Longstop is taken from the lay-back position behind the wicket keeper near the boundary of the cricket field. By mid-April 1943, because of increasing German pressure the British had withdrawn and had lost possession of "Longstop" and all of the higher ground to the north-west, culminating in the Djebel et Tanngoucha.

=== Plan ===
On 20 April, as part of Operation Vulcan, the British troops of the 1st Battalion East Surrey Regiment supported by the 48th Royal Tank Regiment took a nearby hill known as Djebel Djaffa from the Germans, managing in the process to capture several panzers. On 22 April, the 38th (Irish) Infantry Brigade of the 78th Division captured the fortified town of Heidous and the craggy slopes of Tanngoucha. The capture of these positions made sure that the high ground behind Medjez was taken and the next objective would be Longstop.

The 78th Division commander, Vyvyan Evelegh, ordered the 36th Infantry Brigade (Brigadier Bernard Howlett) to seize Longstop Hill by an attack from the south-west. The brigade comprised the 6th Battalion Queen's Own Royal West Kent Regiment, the 5th Buffs (Royal East Kent Regiment), the 8th Argyll and Sutherland Highlanders and the 1st East Surrey Regiment, were detailed for the attack on Longstop, supported by the North Irish Horse equipped with Churchill tanks and by most of the 78th Division artillery.

The Royal West Kents and the Buffs were to lead the attack whilst the Argylls, who were to be held back in reserve at the start, were to pass through the Kents and seize Djebel el Rhar, the right hand higher end of Longstop. If successful, the Surreys with the North Irish Horse were to be prepared to exploit north-eastwards along the road to Tebourba. Defending the position was the 999th Light Afrika Division (Generalmajor Ernst-Günther Baade) which was composed of the 962nd Afrika-Schützen-Regiment and the III/754th Grenadier Regiment. They had adequately prepared the area for defence and were supported by anti-tank guns, mortars and dug in machine gun nests.

== Battle ==
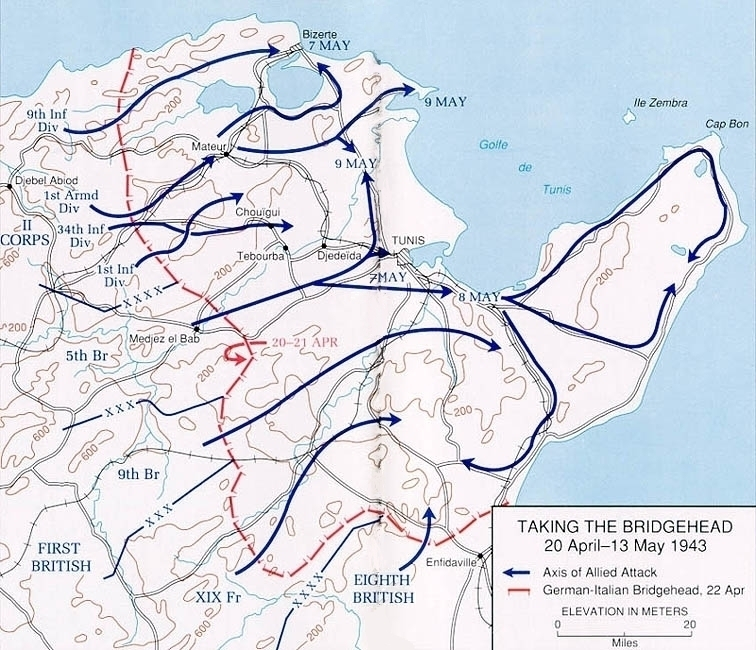
Tunisia Campaign operations 20 April to 13 May 1943

On 22 April, the Surreys, Buffs, West Kents and Argylls dug in, using shallow gullies and depressions wherever they could find them in the open ground, in preparation for the attack. At 8:00 pm the artillery fire of 400 guns, which would last all night, signalled that the battle for Longstop Hill had begun. At 11:30 am the next morning the Surreys and the Argylls advanced but German machine guns and mortars began to inflict casualties on the start line. The 962nd Regiment repulsed the attacks of the West Kents and the Buffs trying to capture Djebel Rhar. This delay had made it impossible for the Argylls to capture the main hills during the hours of darkness. Soon after dawn, Howlett, seeing that his original plan had been too ambitious, went forward and made another plan for the Argylls and the Surreys, supported by the North Irish Horse, to seize the Djebel Ahmera (the western half of Longstop).

=== Djebel Ahmera ===
The Argylls were supported along the southern slopes of Longstop by two squadrons of the North Irish Horse. Behind heavy concentrations of artillery, the Highlanders went up the Djebel Ahmera ridge through heavy machine-gun fire, advancing in box formation through a cornfield. As they reached the base of the hill the commanding officer, Colin McNabb, was killed by shellfire and the attack soon lost cohesion but Major John "Jock" Anderson soon took over command and urged the Argylls to press on. Despite heavy casualties, the Argylls climbed up the hill and were soon among the defenders and started to eliminate the ring of machine gun nests. For inspiring his men and eliminating strong points during the fighting around Djebel Ahmea, Anderson was later awarded the Victoria Cross. The citation for Anderson's award stated:

Major Anderson re-organised the battalion, led the assault on the second objective, and, despite a leg wound, captured Longstop Hill with a total force of only four officers and less than forty other ranks. He personally led attacks on at least three enemy machine-gun positions and in every case was the first man in the enemy gun-pits.

By nightfall, the Argylls, reinforced by the Surreys had managed to complete the capture of Djebel Ahmera along with 200 prisoners and held the hill. The West Kents had moved closer up in reserve but an attempt during the night to capture the next higher peak of Djebel Rhar failed, owing to heavy mortar fire on their forming-up place.

=== Sidi Ahmed ===
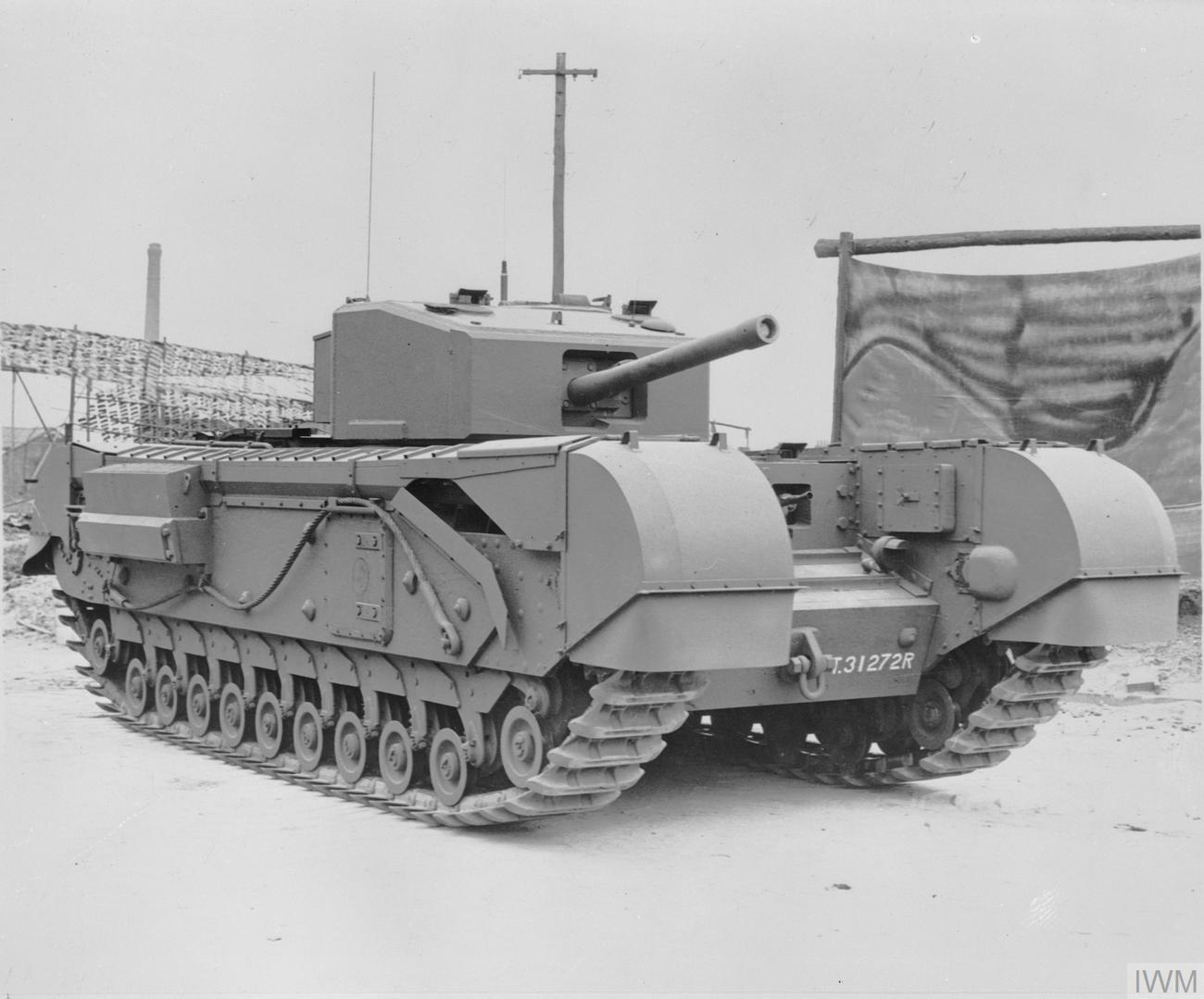
Churchill Mark III tank armed with a 6 pounder gun; the role it played in the capture was crucial

On 24 April, an attempt was made by the Surreys, the 5th (Huntingdonshire) Battalion, Northamptonshire Regiment and a squadron of tanks, to clear Sidi Ahmed ridge just north of Longstop Hill, which contained a white mosque occupied and used as a defensive position by the Germans. In this attack the tanks helped the infantry on to the ridge, which was captured in spite of intense mortar and machine-gun fire. The positions were reinforced by anti-tank guns and mortars in anticipation of a counter-attack which never came.

=== Djebel Rhar ===
During 25 April, no further advance was made by the British but the troops on Djebel Ahmera strengthened their positions and the tanks remained upon the southern slopes. The capture of Djebel Rhar was to take place the next day. A diversionary attack started on 26 April at 8:30 am but the Germans brought down heavy mortar fire on the southern flanks of the hill. The attack mopped up a number of snipers who lay hidden on the southern slopes in ravines and also resulted in the capture of a number of prisoners. On the left at the same time, the Buffs left their start line and worked forward with a squadron of tanks, on the lower northern slopes of the hill and another squadron supporting them on their main axis of advance.

The Churchill tanks descended the gully between Djebel Ahmera and Djebel Rhar and with the Buffs appeared on the north-west slopes; the tanks had remarkably traversed the steep southern slopes. With tanks and infantry working together, they were heavily engaged with mortars and small arms fire. The tanks then reached the defensive rim, eliminating the surprised German strong points one-by-one with Besa machine guns and 6-pounder fire. A tank led by Sergeant O'Hare was the first to reach the summit, breaching the headquarters and capturing fifty prisoners; three more tanks followed having finished their extraordinary drive, getting up inclines that were so steep that in places they had gradients of 1:3. The rest of the regiment arrived and headed up the slopes and with the Buffs eliminated more strong points and cut off escape routes, completing the capture of Longstop and by 11:00 am the battle was over.

== Aftermath ==
The Buffs had lost nine killed and 83 wounded but between them and the North Irish Horse they had captured over 300 prisoners making the total 650, including all of the III/754th Grenadier Regiment's senior officers. One of the German officers noted that when he saw the tanks coming over the summit, "I knew all was over". Other prisoners simply could not believe that tanks had played a role in the capture of the position until they were shown; another called the Churchill tanks "metal mules". With the summit in the hands of 78th Division, the British began to consolidate Longstop Hill against counter-attack and the fire from nearby hills. With the whole of Longstop Hill secured, 'Wilberforce' and the Surreys were relieved. Longstop was the last great natural barrier barring movement towards Tunis.

On 7 May, British armour rolled into Tunis, taking the Axis forces there by surprise, some were caught emerging from shops and bars. By 15 May, all Axis forces had been cut off and soon surrendered with more than 250,000 taken prisoner. Joseph Goebbels admitted it was on the same scale as the Third Reich's disaster at the Battle of Stalingrad and the name Tunisgrad was coined for the defeat.

== See also ==
- List of British military equipment of World War II
- List of German military equipment of World War II

== Bibliography ==
- Blaxland, Gregory (2012). The Buffs. Osprey. ISBN 9781780967691.
- Evans, Bryn (2012). With the East Surreys in Tunisia and Italy 1942–1945: Fighting for Every River and Mountain. Casemate. ISBN 9781783376735.
- Doherty, Richard (2002). The North Irish Horse: A Hundred Years of Service. Appletree press. ISBN 978-1862271906.
- Ford, Ken (1999). Battle-axe Division: From Africa to Italy with the 78 Division 1942–45. Sutton. ISBN 978-0750918930.
- Mitchell, Ian (2019). The Battle of the Peaks and Long Stop Hill. Helion. ISBN 978-1-911628-93-4.
- Perrett, Bryan (1998). At All Costs: Stories of Impossible Victories. Cassell Military Classics. ISBN 978-0304350544.
- Sulzberger, C. L. (1985). World War II. Houghton Mifflin Harcourt. ISBN 9780828103312.
- Watson, Bruce Allen (2007) [1999]. Exit Rommel: The Tunisian Campaign, 1942–43. Stackpole Military History Series. Mechanicsburg, PA: Stackpole Books. ISBN 978-0-8117-3381-6.
