= Governor Kennedy =

Governor Kennedy may refer to:

- John Kennedy (British Army officer, born 1893) (1893–1970), Governor of Southern Rhodesia from 1947 to 1953
- Arthur Kennedy (governor) (1809–1883), Governor of the Gambia, Sierra Leone, Western Australia, Vancouver Island, Hong Kong and Queensland for various periods between 1851 and 1883
