= Robert Pascoe =

British Army general (born 1932)

General Sir Robert Pascoe KCB MBE
- Born: 21 February 1932 (age 94)
- Military career
- Allegiance: United Kingdom
- Branch: British Army
- Rank: General
- Service number: 424428
- Commands: Northern Ireland; 1st Battalion Royal Green Jackets
- Conflicts: Indonesia–Malaysia confrontation Operation Banner
- Awards: Knight Commander of the Order of the Bath; Member of the Order of the British Empire; Mentioned in Despatches

General Sir Robert Alan Pascoe, KCB, MBE (born 21 February 1932) is a retired British Army officer who served as Adjutant-General to the Forces from 1988 to 1990.

== Army career ==
Educated at Tavistock Grammar School and at the Royal Military Academy, Sandhurst, Pascoe was commissioned into the Oxfordshire and Buckinghamshire Light Infantry in 1952. He served with the Oxford and Bucks Light Infantry in the Suez Canal Zone, Osnabrück and in the Cyprus Emergency; including with the 1st Green Jackets (43rd and 52nd) from November 1958 to May 1959. Following which he served in Lebanon where he learned Arabic. He served with the 2nd Battalion The Royal Green Jackets in the United Kingdom and Malaysia from 1964 to 1966, and was mentioned in despatches when serving in Borneo in 1966. He was appointed a Member of the Order of the British Empire in 1968, when commanding a company of the 1st Battalion Royal Green Jackets in the United Nations Peacekeeping Force in Cyprus.

Pascoe commanded the 1st Battalion Royal Green Jackets in the British Army of the Rhine (BAOR) and on two tours in Northern Ireland from 1971 to 1974, and was mentioned in despatches in Northern Ireland in 1974. He went on to command 5 Field Force in BAOR from 1976 to 1979. While attending the Royal College of Defence Studies in 1979 he was sent to Northern Ireland to work on special duty with Sir Maurice Oldfield (former Head of MI6). He was appointed Assistant Chief of the General Staff in 1980, Chief of Staff UKLF at Wilton, in 1983, General Officer Commanding Northern Ireland in 1985, and became a Knight Commander of the Order of the Bath that same year. He was promoted to general in 1988 on appointment to the role of Adjutant General, from which post he retired in 1990.

His honorary posts included being Colonel Commandant of the 1st Battalion The Royal Green Jackets from 1986 to 1991 and ADC General to HM The Queen from 1989 to 1991.

== Later career ==
Pascoe was involved with several charities, including the Regular Forces Employment Association, and the Retired Officers Association and he was Vice President of The Royal Patriotic Fund Corporation which provided assistance to widows and orphans of members of the armed forces. He successfully arranged for this charity to be taken over by SSAFA in 2011. He is currently President of The Veterans Charity, a charity initially set up in 2008 as Project 65 to mark the 65th Anniversary of D Day with a memorial to the men of the coup de main force under Major John Howard of the 2nd Battalion The Oxfordshire and Buckinghamshire Light Infantry who captured the two bridges later named "Pegasus" and "Horsa" on the left flank of the British landing zone. The memorial was unveiled on D-Day 2009 by General Sir Richard Dannatt, then Chief of the General Staff and four Veterans of the operation. The Veterans Charity now provides immediate needs support to Veterans facing hardship and organizes The Forces March every year to raise funds.

== Personal life ==
Pascoe married Pauline Myers on 28 December 1955 in Tavistock. They had four children: a son, Richard, and three daughters, Philippa, Hilary, Joanna. Lady Pascoe died on 8 March 2013. General Pascoe married Mrs Alison Masters on Saturday 10 December 2016 in Marylebone, London.

Military offices
Preceded by Maurice Johnston	Assistant Chief of the General Staff; 1980–1983	Succeeded by Laurence New
Preceded by Robert Richardson	General Officer Commanding the British Army in Northern Ireland; 1985–1988	Succeeded by Sir John Waters
Preceded by Sir David Mostyn	Adjutant General; 1988–1990	Succeeded by Sir David Ramsbotham
