= Assistant Chief of the General Staff (United Kingdom) =

Assistant head of the British Army

The Assistant Chief of the General Staff and Army Chief of Staff is a senior role in the British Army.

== Responsibilities ==
The Assistant Chief of the General Staff supports the Chief of the General Staff in his responsibilities, sets the conditions for the British Army to contribute to success on operations, ensures coherence across the 'Defence Lines of Development' and develops the Army of the Future. The officer is an Army Board member responsible for the Army’s international engagement strategy and the British Army’s internal and external communications policy. As the Army’s senior officer in the Ministry of Defence, he or she provides the gearing between the Ministry of Defence and Army Headquarters. The title of the existing ACGS will be renamed as Director Engagement and Communications (D E&C) on 3 September 2018. The responsibilities of D E&C will deliver the British Army’s communications, both internally, across Defence, across Government, and to the UK public and international partners. On the other hand, the role of the Assistant Chief of the General Staff (ACGS) and Army Chief of Staff (ACOS) will be responsible for directing and delivering the Army’s input into Defence planning. The current Director Strategy, Major General Jonathan Swift, will attain the title of ACGS and ACOS and his previous title of Director Strategy will disappear.

== Assistant Chiefs ==
Assistant Chiefs of the Imperial General Staff:

- Major General Laurence Carr (1939–1940)
- Major General Arthur Percival (Apr 1940 – Jul 1940)
- Major General Desmond Anderson (May 1940 – Jul 1940)
- Lieutenant General Gordon Macready (Oct 1940 – Jun 1942)
- Major General Daril Watson (Jun 1942 – Dec 1942)
- Major General John Evetts (Dec 1942 – Aug 1944)
- Major General John Kennedy (Oct 1943 – Feb 1945)
- Major General Vyvyan Evelegh (Aug 1944–1945)
- Major General Frank Simpson (Feb 1945 – Feb 1946)

Assistant Chiefs of the General Staff:

- Major General William Jackson (1968–1970)
- Major General Ian Gill (1970–1972)
- Major General Frank Caldwell (1972–1974)
- Major General Hugh Cunningham (1974–1975)
- Major General Henry Roper (1975–1978)
- Major General Ian Baker (1978–1980)
- Major General Maurice Johnston (Jan 1980 – Dec 1980)
- Major General Robert Pascoe (1980–1983)
- Major General Laurence New (1983–1984)
- Major General John MacMillan (1984–1987)
- Major General Charles Guthrie (1987–1989)
- Major General Richard Swinburn (1989–1990)
- Major General Roger Wheeler (1990–1992)
- Major General Michael Walker (1992–1994)
- Major General Timothy Granville-Chapman (1994–1996)
- Major General Michael Willcocks (1996–1999)
- Major General Kevin O'Donoghue (1999–2001)
- Major General Richard Dannatt (2001–2002)
- Major General David Richards (2002–2005)
- Major General Bill Rollo (2005–2007)
- Major General Simon Mayall (2007–2009)
- Major General James Bucknall (2009–2010)
- Major General Richard Barrons (2010–2011)
- Major General James Everard (2011–2013)
- Major General David Cullen (2013–2015)
- Major General Nick Welch (2015–2018)
- Major General Rupert Jones (Jan 2018 – Sep 2018)
- Major General James Swift (Sep 2018 – Nov 2018)
- Major General Ralph Wooddisse (Nov 2018 – Mar 2021)
- Major General Nick Perry (Mar 2021–2022)
- Major General Charles Collins (2022–2023)
- Major General Paul Griffiths (2023–2025)
- Major General Jonathan Swift (2025–present)
