= Ian Baker (British Army officer) =

British Army general

Major-General Ian Baker CBE
- Born: 26 November 1927
- Died: 28 July 2005 (aged 77)
- Military career
- Allegiance: United Kingdom
- Branch: British Army
- Service years: 1948–1982
- Rank: Major-General
- Commands: 1st Royal Tank Regiment; 7th Armoured Brigade; North East District
- Conflicts: Malayan Emergency
- Awards: Commander of the Order of the British Empire

Major-General Ian Helstrip Baker CBE (26 November 1927 – 28 July 2005) was a British Army officer who became Assistant Chief of the General Staff.

== Military career ==
Educated at St Peter's School, York, and St Edmund Hall, Oxford, Baker was commissioned into the Royal Artillery in 1948. He served in Malaya from 1960 to 1962 during the Malayan Emergency. He was appointed commanding officer of 1st Royal Tank Regiment in 1967, Commander of 7th Armoured Brigade in 1972 and Assistant Chief of the General Staff in 1978. He went on to be General Officer Commanding North East District in 1980 before retiring in 1982. He was also Colonel Commandant of the Royal Tank Regiment from 1981 to 1986.

In retirement he became Secretary and Head of Administration at University College London.

== Family ==
In 1956 he married Susan (Sally) Lock; they had two sons and a daughter.

Military offices
Preceded by Henry Roper	Assistant Chief of the General Staff; 1978–1980	Succeeded by Sir Maurice Johnston
Preceded by Henry Woods	General Officer Commanding North East District; 1980–1982	Succeeded by Patrick Palmer
