= Battle of Centuripe =

Battle during World War II

- Part of the Allied invasion of Sicily
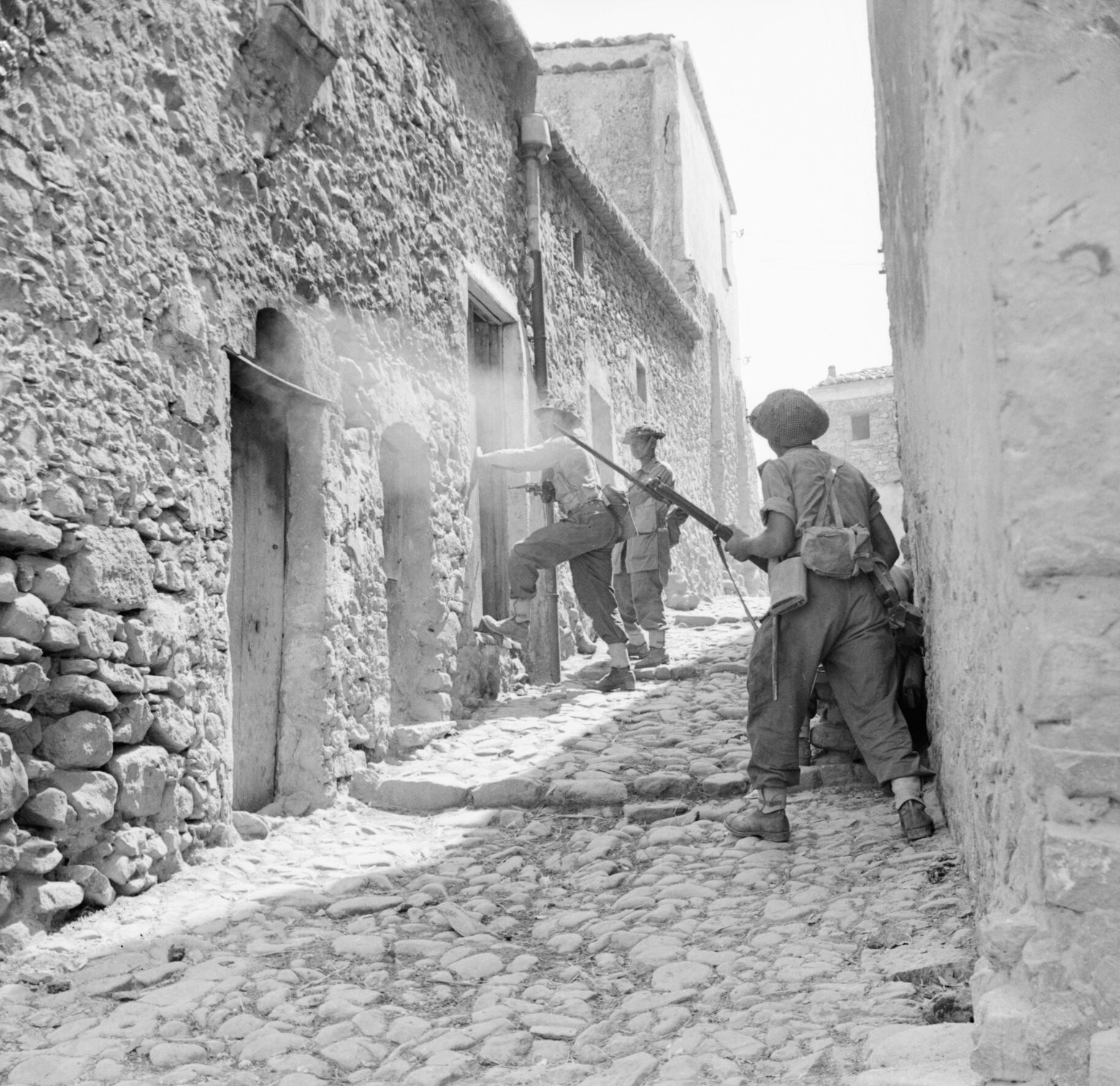
- Men of the 6th Battalion, Royal Inniskilling Fusiliers during mopping up operations in Centuripe.
Date	2–4 August 1943
Location	Centuripe, Sicily 37°37′N 14°44′E
Result	British victory

Belligerents
United Kingdom	(Nazi Germany) Germany

Commanders and leaders
(United Kingdom) Nelson Russell (United Kingdom) John Fullerton Evetts	(Nazi Germany) Ludwig Heilmann

Strength
(United Kingdom) 78th Infantry Division: 38th (Irish) Infantry Brigade	(Nazi Germany) 1st Paratroop Panzer Division

The Battle of Centuripe was fought from 2 to 4 August 1943, as part of the Allied invasion of Sicily during World War II. The 78th Battleaxe Division, of the British Eighth Army, was engaged in fierce fighting around the town of Centuripe in the hill country of central Sicily, between the Rivers Dittaìno and Salso. Centuripe, a hill town set on a very high rocky pinnacle and approached by only one steep and twisty road, itself was the key to the whole Adrano position, the capture of which would in turn force the Germans to withdraw to new positions. The British troops captured the town after heavy fighting and as a result caused the Germans to start contemplating abandoning Sicily altogether.

== Background ==
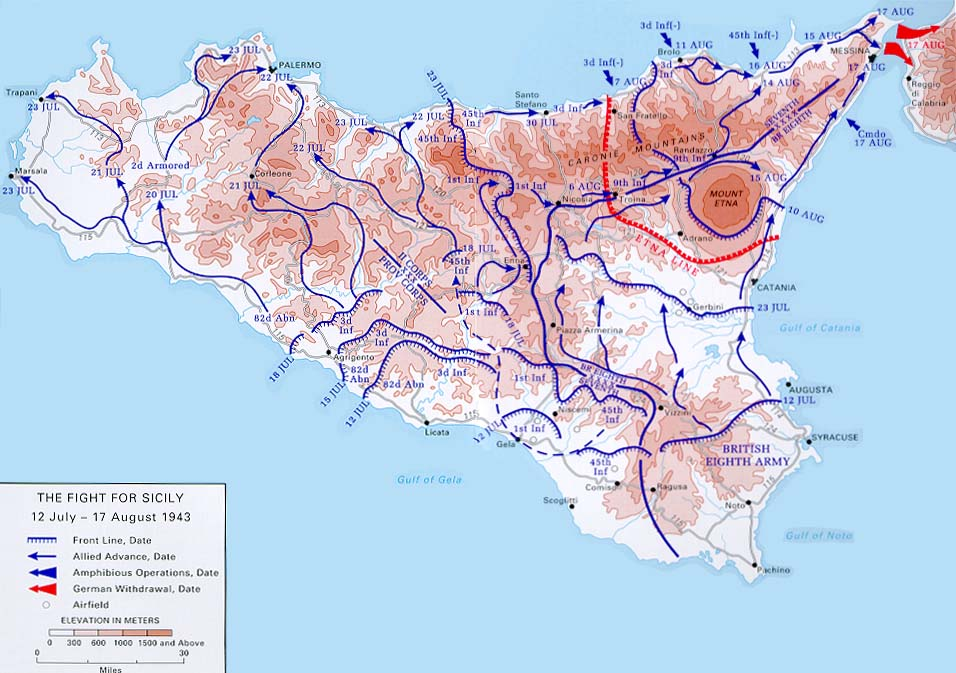
Allied movements on Sicily during the month of July.

The key position in the German defense line across Sicily was Centuripe, a village perched on the top of a formidable line of steep hills along with its precipitous sides which gave it an almost impregnable position. The lesser hills round it were well defended by the Germans and it was necessary for them to be mastered before Centuripe could be tackled. Defending this position was the Hermann Göring Division, consisting mostly of the 3rd Fallschirmjäger Regiment as part of Kampfgruppe von Carnap under Ludwig Heilmann. As well as the regiment, the kampfgruppe consisted of an artillery regiment and a number of reconnaissance units which included a number of tanks with supporting infantry units. Heilmann had replaced the commander Oberstleutenant Von Carnap after he had been killed by British artillery fire in late July.

The 78th Battleaxe Infantry Division, under the command of Major-General Vyvyan Evelegh, assembled for a drive towards Catenanuova and to capture Centuripe as part of Operation Hardgate. The country between the two villages was wild and rough with great rocky crags, similar to those among which the 78th had fought in the campaign in Tunisia, and this terrain covered the one mountain road between them. Evelegh ordered Brigadier Nelson Russell, commander of the 38th (Irish) Infantry Brigade, to take Centuripe, and the plan was for a night advance to be made with heavy artillery fire available at call. The 6th Battalion, Royal Inniskilling Fusiliers and the 1st Battalion, Royal Irish Fusiliers were given the main tasks, and the 2nd Battalion, London Irish Rifles were ordered to make a dangerous flanking manoeuvre.

On the evening of August 1 the London Irish moved to a lying-up area in the wadis below the foothills of Centuripe. No transport was able to get forward and that meant that all ammunition, food, and other supplies had to be man-handled causing a delay.

== Battle ==
At noon next day the London Irish went forward to a line behind the 6th Battalion, Queen's Own Royal West Kent Regiment, of 36th Infantry Brigade, who were fighting in the hills behind Centuripe, and in the August heat they could see the village resting on the summit of the large hill. The job of the London Irish was to take three commanding hills, Points 704, 611, and 703 behind Centuripe but it was not known in what strength they were held by the Germans. It was hoped that most of German attention would be to the main battle and that they would concentrate on this rather than their rear.

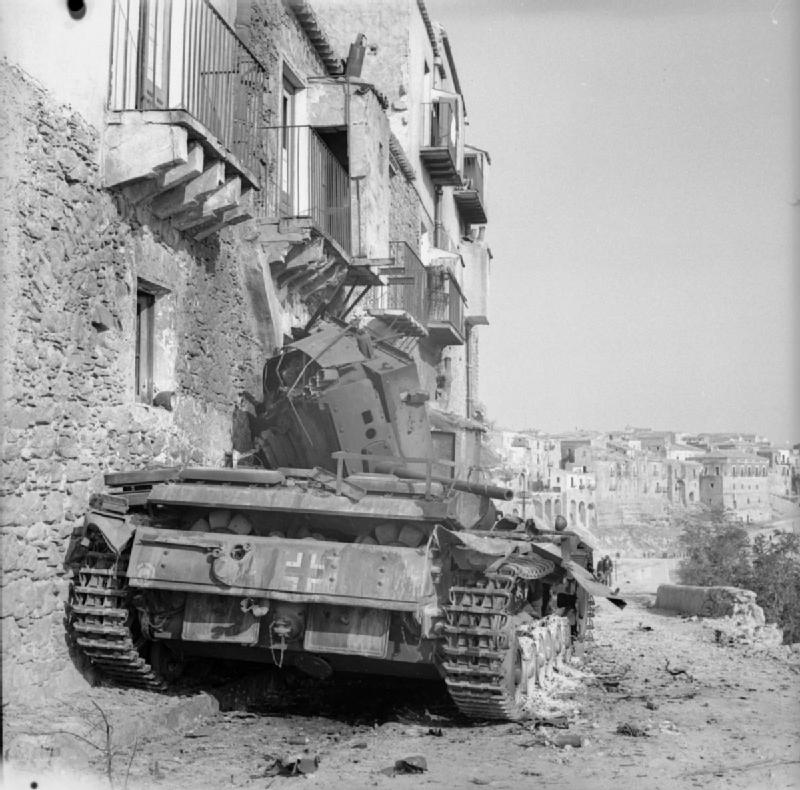
A Panzer III tank knocked out during the fierce street fighting in Centuripe

The London Irish G and F Companies crossed the start-lines after a fifteen-minute warm-up by the 25-pounders, and they were soon on Points 704 and when G Company overwhelmed the position, H Company moved on to take Point 703. On the start-line they had some casualties as they had to face machine-guns from the hill and from the sides; G Company helped in silencing the enfilade fire, and when darkness came the London Irish consolidated on the ground gained. The third hill however still held out and the decision had to be made whether to wait until it had fallen, or to carry on without delay and rely on the preoccupation of the Germans with the left-flank attack. The latter course was taken; the Royal Irish Fusiliers put in their assault towards the north and rear of Centuripe, and the Inniskillings, who throughout had been in close contact with the Germans on the frontal sector, obtained a foothold on the southern edge of the village after a heavy barrage, which included scaling a 100-foot cliff.

The Royal Irish Fusiliers pushed through the northern end of the town, fighting was stubborn and hard; two German Panzer MKIII's created the most problems; there were no British tanks up in support and these were knocked out eventually by PIAT weapons. The Irish brigade then had the difficult task of house to house fighting which proved difficult against the tough paratroopers, by the evening it was thought the town was cleared but the Germans counterattacked and although it was largely repelled some units sneaked back in to snipe as the Irish cleared the streets and houses. Throughout the night more men from 38th Brigade moved into the town to reinforce those already there. Finally the Germans launched another counterattack but this time it was weak and easily repelled after which resistance began to fade.

Just before dawn on August 3 the whole of the environs including Centuripe fell to the Irish Brigade. The operation had been a tough one, in difficult country and chief credit for the success was due to the Inniskillings, who bore the brunt of the fighting.

In August 1943, there was no respite after Centuripe had been captured and the Irish Fusiliers mastered heights beyond the village, and the London Irish, marching through Centuripe, reached rising ground overlooking the River Salso. The transport had difficulty in getting down the winding road from Centuripe because of a large crater which took the sappers twelve hours to fill in and also because the Germans in their retreat scattered mortar bombs and shells in the area.

== Aftermath ==
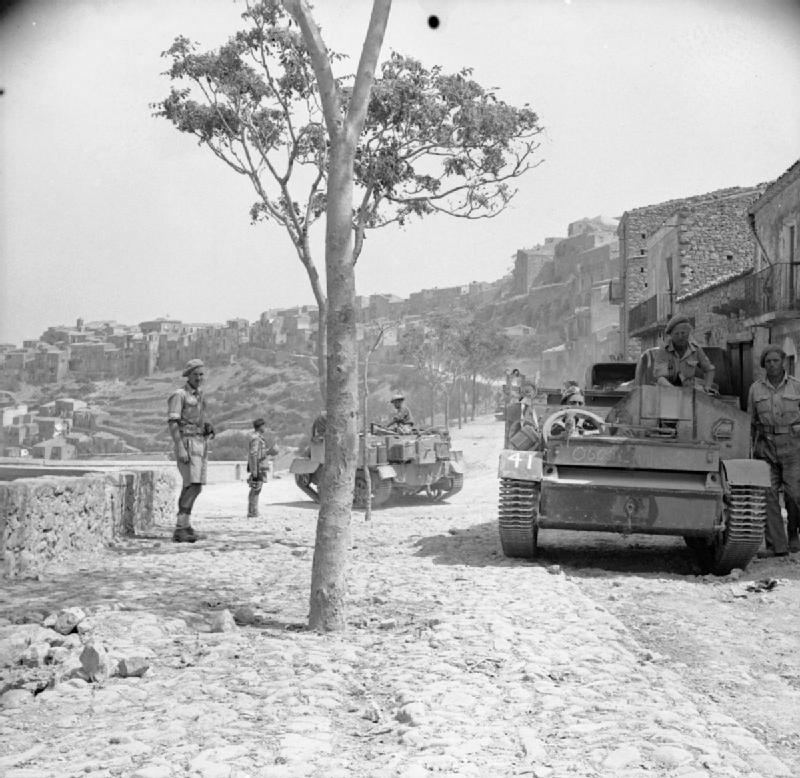
British troops in Centuripe.

The successful capture of Centuripe had caused the whole German line to Catania to crack and thus had to withdraw to a new position: the Etna line. This however had to be abandoned and soon plans were made to abandon the island of Sicily as a whole.

The London Irish quickly reached high ground on the far side of the Salso, and at night 'E' and 'F' Companies got to the Simeto. As dusk approached, two platoons of 'G' Company moved across the river with reserve ammunition, mortars, and machine-guns for the immediate support of the two other companies. By darkness the bridgehead was secure and the Germans withdrew during the night so that in the morning a fighting patrol from the London Irish located the Germans half-way up the hills on top of which was the next objective, the much-bombed town of Adrano. That, however, was not an Irish Brigade task, for the two other brigades (11th and 36th) of the 78th Division went through. From the afternoon of August 1 to nightfall on August 5 the Irish Brigade had advanced twenty-five miles fighting battles at Centuripe, Salso, and the Simeto.

The battalion spent five days resting in the cool waters of the Simeto, by which time the rest of the division had captured Aderno and Bronte, and were holding the hills on the far side of the latter town. The crossing of the Salso and Simeto Rivers and the fall of Aderno had cut all the German lateral communications west and south of Mount Etna, and caused the fall of Paterno, Santa Maria, and Biancavilla. The 1st Royal Irish Fusiliers, in the meantime, had captured Capella and Monte Maletto and cleared the village. The fall of Maletto and the subsequent rapid approach to Randazzo forced the Germans on their last hurried withdrawal to the sea.

News of the capture of Centuripe was met with great enthusiasm, General Bernard Montgomery, the British Eighth Army commander, when shown the cliffs of the town after its capture shouted impossible!. The British Prime Minister, Winston Churchill mentioned the news of the capture in the House of Commons only a few days later, citing the capture as one of the greatest achievements in storming.

== Noted participants ==
- Sir John Anthony Holt Saunders chairman of The Hongkong and Shanghai Banking Corporation in a supporting role with the East Surrey Regiment
