= John Evetts =

British Army general (1891–1988)

Lieutenant-General Sir John Evetts CB CBE MC
- Born: 30 June 1891; Naini Tal, West Bengal, India
- Died: 21 December 1988 (aged 97); Cheltenham, Gloucestershire, England
- Burial place: Kemerton, Worcestershire, England
- Military career
- Allegiance: United Kingdom
- Branch: British Army
- Service years: 1911–1946
- Rank: Lieutenant-General
- Nickname: "Jack"
- Service number: 4551
- Units: Cameronians; Machine Gun Corps; Royal Ulster Rifles
- Commands: 6th Infantry Division; 16th Infantry Brigade; 1st Battalion, Royal Ulster Rifles
- Conflicts: First World War; Arab revolt in Palestine; Second World War
- Awards: Knight Bachelor; Companion of the Order of the Bath; Commander of the Order of the British Empire; Military Cross; Legion of Merit (United States); Mentioned in Despatches
- Other work: Master-General of the Ordnance managing director, Rotol Limited and British Messier; Chairmanchairman, Rotol Limited and British Messier

Lieutenant-General Sir John Fullerton Evetts, CB, CBE, MC (30 June 1891 – 21 December 1988) was a senior British Army officer.

== Early life and First World War ==
Born in 1891 in Naini Tal, West Bengal, India, John Fullerton Evetts was educated at Lancing College and the Royal Military College, Sandhurst. Upon passing out from Sandhurst, Evetts was commissioned as a second lieutenant into the Cameronians (Scottish Rifles) on 19 September 1911. Among his fellow graduates were three future general officers, Kenneth Anderson, Eric Nares and Montagu Stopford.

Evetts, promoted on 1 July 1913 to lieutenant, fought on the Western Front during the First World War. Promoted to the temporary rank of captain on 10 August 1915, and captain on 1 October 1915, he was awarded the Military Cross (MC) in January 1918 and was mentioned in despatches while serving with the Machine Gun Corps (MGC). Serving from April 1917 as a brigade major with the 26th Brigade, part of the 15th (Scottish) Division, a Kitchener's Army formation, he ended the war as a temporary major, having been promoted to that rank on 9 February 1916.

== Between the wars ==
Reverting to the Cameronians after the MGC was disbanded, Evetts returned to England to attend the Staff College, Camberley from 1922 to 1923. Several fellow students were to become general officers, such as Charles Fullbrook-Leggatt, Thomas Hutton, Keith Simmons, and Gerald Smallwood.

He was seconded to the Iraqi Army from 1925 to 1928 and was Deputy Assistant Adjutant-General (DAAG) at the War Office from 1932. In 1934 he transferred from the Cameronians to the Royal Ulster Rifles and was commanding officer (CO) of the 1st Battalion of his new regiment from 1934.

He was posted to Palestine as a General staff Officer Grade 1 (GSO1) and, from 23 September 1936 when he was promoted to brigadier, he commanded the 16th Infantry Brigade, commanding it throughout most of the Arab revolt. Evetts was in charge of organizing British troops to protect isolated Jewish farm settlements which were coming under siege of Arab militants. During that time he commanded British troops during the fighting known as the Battle of Anabta against Arab insurgents. He was appointed mayor of Nablus shortly after this.

He was rare for being popular both among Arab civilians and among Jewish communities he was tasked with protecting. Both groups "regarded him as fair". However, he was also personally sympathetic towards the aspirations of the Jewish settlers and "greatly disheartened" by the fact they were coming under attack.

For his services there he was mentioned in despatches in April 1939, and made a Commander of the Order of the British Empire (CBE) in April 1938.

== Second World War ==
During the Second World War Evetts was a brigadier on the General Staff of Northern Command in India from 1939 and then he commanded the Western (Independent) District in India from 1940. He was general officer commanding (GOC) of the 6th Infantry Division in North Africa from 1941. Evetts served in Operation Husky, the Allied invasion of Sicily, in 1943, seeing action at the Battle of Centuripe. He was Assistant Chief of the Imperial General Staff (ACIGS) from 1943 and senior military advisor to the minister of supply from 1944. He retired in 1946.

== Postwar and later life ==
From 1946 to 1950, Evetts led the establishment of the Anglo-Australian Joint Project, which led to the formation and development of the Long Range Weapons Establishment (LRWE) at Salisbury, in Adelaide, South Australia, and the famous 'Woomera Rocket Range' (now the 'Woomera Test Range') 460 km north of Adelaide. He was knighted in the 1951 King's Birthday Honours List.

In retirement, he became managing director and then Chairman of Rotol Limited and British Messier.

== Bibliography ==
- Smart, Nick (2005). Biographical Dictionary of British Generals of the Second World War. Barnesley: Pen & Sword. ISBN 1844150496.

Military offices
Preceded by Richard O'Connor	GOC 6th Infantry Division; January–September 1941	Post disbanded
Preceded by Daril Watson	Assistant Chief of the Imperial General Staff; 1942–1944	Succeeded by John Kennedy
