= Run for Tunis =

1942 battle in Tunisia

The Run for Tunis
- Part of the Tunisian campaign of the Second World War
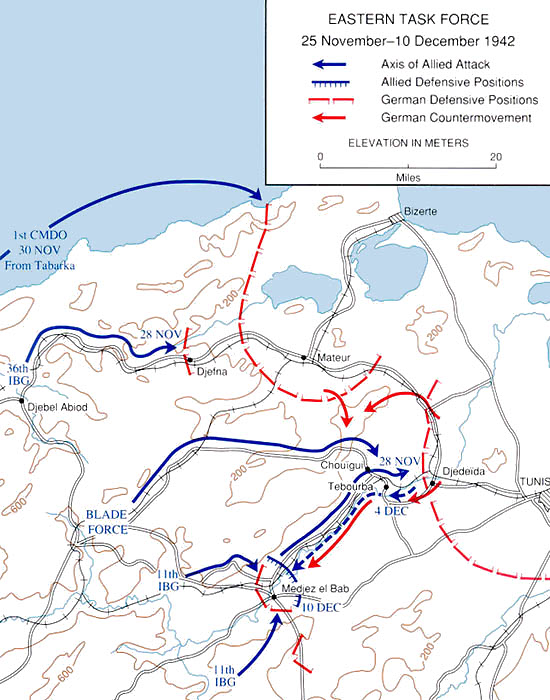
| Date | 10 November – 25 December 1942 (1 month, 2 weeks and 1 day) |
| Location | Tunisia 34°N 09°E |
| Result | Axis victory |

Belligerents
| United Kingdom; United States; Free France | Germany; Italy |

Commanders and leaders
| (United Kingdom) Kenneth Anderson; (United Kingdom) Vyvyan Evelegh; (United States) Lloyd Fredendall | (Nazi Germany) Walther Nehring (Kingdom of Italy) Vittorio Sogno |

The Run for Tunis was part of the Tunisia Campaign which took place during November and December 1942 during the Second World War. Once French opposition to the Allied Operation Torch landings had ceased in mid-November, the Allies made a rapid advance by a division-sized force east from Algeria, to capture Tunis and forestall an Axis build up in Tunisia and narrowly failed. Some Allied troops were fewer than 20 miles (32 km) short of Tunis by late November but the defenders counter-attacked and pushed them back nearly 20 miles (32 km), to positions which had stabilised by the end of the year.

== Background ==
=== Allies ===
The planners of Operation Torch had assumed that Vichy would oppose the landings and the invasion convoys had a preponderance of infantry to meet ground opposition. At Algiers the disembarkation of mobile forces for an advance did not commence until 12 November, making an advance eastwards possible only by 15 November. The Allies had only two infantry brigade groups from the British 78th Infantry Division (Major-General Vyvyan Evelegh), an armoured regimental group from the British 6th Armoured Division (Blade Force) and some additional artillery for an advance. An attempt to reach Bizerta and Tunis overland before the Axis could establish themselves, was a gamble which depended on the ability of the navy and air force to delay an Axis build-up. (Note: After the event, Anderson and Cunningham, the naval commander, expressed the view that without landings east of Algiers, the race for Tunis was lost before it started.)

=== Axis ===
Although the Allies planned for determined Vichy opposition to the Torch landings they underestimated the speed with which the Axis could reinforce Tunisia. Despite intelligence reports regarding the Axis reaction, the Allies were slow to respond and it was not until nearly two weeks after the landings that air and naval plans were made to interdict Axis sea transport to Tunis. At the end of November, naval Force K was reformed in Malta, with three cruisers and four destroyers and Force Q was formed in Bône with three cruisers and two destroyers. No Axis ships sailing to Tunis were sunk in November but the Allied navies sank seven Axis transports in early December. The success was too late because the tanks of the 10th Panzer Division had arrived. Axis convoys began to sail in daylight when they could be protected by aircraft. Night convoys resumed on completion of the extension of Axis minefields which severely restricted Force K and Force Q.

=== Vichy ===
Tunisian officials were undecided about whom to support and airfields were left open to both sides; on 9 November, reconnaissance flights reported that forty German aircraft had landed at Tunis and next day British photographic reconnaissance showed around 100 German aircraft there. That day the Regia Aeronautica (Italian Air Force) sent 28 fighters to Tunis and two days later an airlift began which eventually carried 15,000 men and 581 short tons (527 t) of supplies; ships brought 176 tanks, 131 guns, 1,152 vehicles and 13,000 short tons (12,000 t) of supplies. By the end of the month, three German divisions, including the 10th Panzer Division (Major-General Wolfgang Fischer), and two Italian infantry divisions had arrived. On 12 November, Walther Nehring was appointed to the new XC Corps and arrived on 17 November. The French commander in Tunisia, General Barré, moved the Vichy troops into the mountains and formed a defensive line from Tebersouk through Majaz al Bab (also referred to as Medjez el Bab), with orders to resist an attempt to cross.

== Prelude ==
=== Vichy Armistice ===
By 10 November, French opposition to the Torch landings had ceased, creating a military vacuum in Tunisia. On 9 November, Lieutenant-General Kenneth Anderson took command of the Eastern Task Force in Algiers, which was renamed the British First Army. Anderson ordered troops eastward to seize the ports of Bougie, Philippeville and Bône and the airfield at Djedjelli, preliminary to advancing into Tunisia. Allied planners had ruled out an assault landing in Tunisia, because of a lack of troops and the threat from the air; the Allies needed to advance before the Axis could reinforce Tunis. On 11 November, the British 36th Infantry Brigade had landed unopposed at Bougie but supply difficulties meant Djedjelli was only reached by road on 13 November. Bône airfield was occupied following a parachute drop by 3rd Parachute Battalion and this was followed up on 12 November by No. 6 Commando seizing the port.

Advanced guards of 36th Brigade reached Tabarka on 15 November and Djebel Abiod on 18 November where they made first contact with opposition forces. Further south, on 15 November, U.S. Army paratroopers of the 509th Parachute Infantry Battalion made an unopposed drop on Youks-les-Bains, captured the airfield and took the airfield at Gafsa on 17 November. On 19 November, General Nehring demanded passage for his forces across the bridge at Medjez and was refused by Barré. The Germans attacked twice and were repulsed but the French defence was costly and lacking armour and artillery, the French withdrew. Despite some Vichy French forces siding with the Allies, the position of most Vichy forces was uncertain. On 22 November, the North African Agreement placed Vichy French North Africa on the Allied side and Allied garrison troops were released for the front; the Axis had been reinforced to a corps and outnumbered the Allies.

=== Plan ===
There were two roads eastwards into Tunisia from Algeria. The Allied plan was to advance along the two roads and take Bizerte and Tunis. Once Bizerte was taken Torch would come to an end. Attacking in the north toward Bizerte would be the 36th Infantry Brigade of the 78th Infantry Division, supported by "Hart Force", a small mobile detachment from the British 11th Infantry Brigade and to the south the rest of the 11th Infantry Brigade. On their left was Blade Force (Colonel Richard Hull), an armoured regimental group which included the tanks of the 17th/21st Lancers, a U.S. light tank battalion plus motorised infantry, paratroops, artillery, anti-tank and anti-aircraft guns and engineers.

== Battle ==
=== Allied attack ===
Sketch map of Tunisia during the 1942–1943 campaign

The two Allied columns advanced towards Djebel Abiod and Beja, under attack from the Luftwaffe, which had local air superiority, because Allied aircraft had to fly from distant bases in Algeria. On the northern road, the leading elements of the 36th Brigade made rapid progress until 17 November, when they met a mixed force of 17 tanks, 400 paratroops and self-propelled guns at Djebel Abiod. The British knocked out eleven tanks but having no tank support, were held up for nine days. The Allied columns concentrated at Djebel Abiod and Beja, preparing for an assault on 24 November. The 36th Brigade (Brigadier A.L. Kent-Lemon) was to advance from Djebel Abiod towards Mateur and 11th Infantry Brigade was to move down the valley of the river Merjerda, to take Majaz al Bab (also known as Medjez el Bab or Medjez) and thence to Tebourba, Djedeida and Tunis.

Blade Force was to strike across country on minor roads, in the gap between the two infantry brigades, towards Sidi Nsir and make flanking attacks on Terbourba and Djedeida. The northern attack was cancelled because of torrential rain and in the south, the 11th Infantry Brigade was stopped by the defenders of Medjez. Blade Force passed through Sidi Nsir, to reach the Chouigui Pass north of Terbourba, then Company C, 1st Battalion, 1st Armored Regiment, U.S. 1st Armored Division (Major Rudolph Barlow) with 17 M3 Stuart light tanks, supported by armoured cars of the Derbyshire Yeomanry, infiltrated behind Axis lines to an airbase at Djedeida in the afternoon. The Allied tanks destroyed more than twenty Axis aeroplanes (including an entire group belonging to Sturzkampfgeschwader 3), shot up buildings, supply dumps and caused several casualties; lacking infantry support, the raiders withdrew to Chouigui.

The surprise achieved by Blade Force alerted Nehring to the vulnerability of garrison at Medjez to a flanking move and the defenders were withdrawn to Djedeida, only 30 km (19 mi) from Tunis. The 36th Infantry Brigade attack began on 26 November but Nehring used the delay at Djebel Abiod, to lay an ambush at Jefna on the road from Sedjenane and Mateur. The Germans occupied high ground on either side of the road, which after heavy rain was very muddy and the ground on either side impassable for vehicles; the leading British battalion had 149 casualties. Kent-Lemon sent units into the hills to outflank the Germans but the determined defence of the paratroopers in well-laid out defences could not be overcome. A landing by No. 1 Commando 14 mi (23 km) west of Bizerta on 30 November to outflank the Jefna position failed; the commandos rejoined 36th Brigade by 3 December and the position remained in German hands, until the last days of the fighting in Tunisia in 1943.

=== German retirement ===
Early on 26 November, the 11th Infantry Brigade entered Medjez unopposed, reached Tebourba unopposed, ready to advance on Djedeida. Next day, the Germans attacked, inflicted 137 casualties and took 286 prisoners. The brigade attacked again on 28 November towards Djedeida airfield and Combat Command "B", 1st US Armored Division, lost 19 tanks to anti-tank guns in the town. On 29 November, fresh units of the 1st Guards Brigade (78th Infantry Division), which had arrived at Algiers on 22 November, began to relieve the 11th Infantry Brigade. On 29 November, Combat Command "B" had assembled to attack with Blade Force on 2 December. The 2nd Battalion, Parachute Regiment (Lieutenant-Colonel John Frost) was to be dropped on the same day near Axis airfields around Depienne 30 mi (48 km) south of Tunis, to destroy Junkers Ju 87 Stuka dive bombers at Oudna airfield and to threaten Tunis from the south. The main attack was forestalled by an Axis counter-attack on 1 December and the attack by Blade Force did not take place; the 2nd Battalion retreated 50 miles (80 km) to Allied lines under frequent attack and lost 23 killed and wounded and 266 missing.

The Axis counter-attack was conducted by the 10th Panzer Division, which had just arrived in Tunisia, from the north toward Tebourba. Blade Force suffered considerable casualties and by the evening of 2 December, had been withdrawn, leaving the 11th Infantry Brigade and Combat Command "B" to resist the Axis attack, which nearly cut off the brigade and broke through. Desperate fighting by 2nd Battalion, Hampshire Regiment (1st Guards Brigade) and the 1st Battalion, East Surrey Regiment for four days delayed the Axis advance and with the fight of Combat Command "B" against armoured and infantry attacks from the south-east, enabled a slow retirement to high ground on each side of the river west of Terbourba. The Hampshires suffered 75 percent casualties and the Surreys nearly 60 percent casualties.

As more Allied troops arrived, the V Corps (Lieutenant-General Charles Walter Allfrey) of the First Army took all forces in the Tebourba sector, which included the 6th Armoured Division, 78th Infantry Division, Combat Command B from US 1st Armored Division, 1st Parachute Brigade, 1 and 6 Commandos. Allfrey considered the depleted units facing Tebourba were vulnerable and ordered a retirement of about 6 mi (9.7 km) to the high ground of Longstop Hill (djebel el Ahmera) 900 ft (270 m) high and Bou Aoukaz on either side of the river. On 10 December, Axis tanks attacked Combat Command "B" on Bou Aoukaz, bogged in the mud and then U.S. tanks counter-attacked and also mired and were picked off, losing 18 tanks.

=== Subsequent operations ===
Another Allied attack was ready by late December 1942, when the Allied force comprised 54,000 British, 73,800 American and 7,000 French troops. A hasty intelligence review showed about 125,000 combat and 70,000 service troops, mostly Italian, in front of them. On the night of 16/17 December, a company of the 1st US Infantry Division raided Maknassy, 155 mi (249 km) south of Tunis and took 21 German prisoners. The main attack began the afternoon of 22 December, despite rain and insufficient air cover; elements of the 18th Regimental Combat Team, 1st Infantry Division (18th RCT) and the 2nd Battalion, Coldstream Guards of the 1st Guards Brigade made progress up the lower ridges of Longstop Hill that dominated the river corridor from Medjez to Tebourba and thence to Tunis. By the morning of 23 December, the Coldstreams had driven back units of the 10th Panzer Division on the summit, been relieved by the 18th RCT and withdrawn to Mejdez. The Germans regained the hill in a counter-attack, the Guards were ordered back and next day regained the peak and dug-in with the 18th RCT. By 25 December, with ammunition running low and Axis forces holding adjacent high ground, the Longstop position became untenable and the Allies were forced to withdraw to Medjez.

== See also ==
- List of British military equipment of World War II

- List of equipment of the United States Army during World War II
- List of French military equipment of World War II
- List of German military equipment of World War II
- List of Italian Army equipment in World War II
- North African campaign timeline
- List of World War II Battles
- Panzer Army Africa
