= 78th Infantry Division (United Kingdom) =

WW2 British Army formation

- A battleaxe, the division insignia.
- Active: May 1942 – August 1946
- Country: United Kingdom
- Branch: British Army
- Type: Infantry
- Size: Division, at war establishment strength 17,298-18,347 men (Note: The first figure is the war establishment, the on-paper strength, of an infantry division formed during or after 1941. The second figure is the on-paper strength of a division following 1944. For information on how division sizes changed during the war please see British Army during the Second World War.)
- Nickname: "Battleaxe Division"
- Battle honours: 1942: Tebourba Gap 1943: Oued Zarga, Medjez Plain, Tunis, Adrano, The Sangro; 1944: Cassino II, Liri Valley, Trasimene Line, Advance to Florence 1945: The Senio, Argenta Gap

Commanders
- Notable commanders: Vyvyan Evelegh; Sir Charles Keightley

The 78th Infantry Division, also known as the Battleaxe Division, was an infantry division of the British Army, raised during the Second World War that fought, with great distinction, in Tunisia, Sicily and Italy from late 1942–1945.

== Background ==
Following the Battle of France and the Battle of Britain in 1940, the Western Desert Campaign in North Africa became the primary focus of British military operations during the Second World War. Between 1940 and 1942, British Commonwealth forces fought a back and forth campaign with Italian and German troops across Italian Libya. Under the command of General der Panzertruppe Erwin Rommel, the Italian-German force gained the upper hand during the Battle of Gazala and inflicted a major defeat upon the British Eighth Army. The battle resulted in the fall of the port of Tobruk, a calamity second only to the fall of Singapore in February 1942. The Eighth Army retreated from its gains in Libya over the Frontier Wire into Egypt, where several battles were fought that culminated in the Second Battle of El Alamein (23 October – 11 November).

On 7 December 1941, the Empire of Japan entered the war by attacking the British colony of Malaya and the American naval base at Pearl Harbor. Four days later, Germany declared war on the United States, bringing the Americans into the European conflict. The United States military favoured Operation Sledgehammer, a cross-channel invasion of German-occupied France. Such a move was opposed by the British, who acknowledged the military weakness of the Allies to undertake such an endeavour, especially as the British Army would have to provide the main force for such an operation. In July 1942, the Anglo-Americans met in London and agreed that Operation Roundup, Sledgehammer's successor, would be postponed and joint operations would begin in North Africa.

During 1941, planning took place for a proposed British landing in French North Africa. This operation, codenamed Gymnast, aimed to support a successful Operation Crusader offensive in Cyrenacia by drawing off Axis reinforcements, then in conjunction with the Eighth Army would defeat the Axis forces in North Africa. Following the American entry into the war, the United States Army developed the British plan into "Super Gymnast". This plan assumed that the Vichy French garrison would invite the Allied force to land and then rejoin the Allies. The combined force would then defeat the Axis forces in North Africa, but lack of shipping, setbacks for the Eighth Army, and a lack of co-operation from the French in North Africa, led to planning being suspended on 12 March. During the Anglo-American meeting in London, in July 1942, Operation Gymnast was revived. The revised plan, known as Operation Torch, sought to clear Africa of Axis forces and release Allied shipping, relieve pressure on the Soviet Union, and allow American ground forces to engage the Germans. (Note: On 22 June 1941, Germany and her allies invaded the Soviet Union in Operation Barbarossa with over 3.5 million soldiers, which inflicted huge defeats upon the Soviet Red Army in the opening months of fighting.)

== History ==
=== Formation ===
On 25 May 1942, the 78th Infantry Division was formed in Scotland specifically as an assault formation for Operation Torch. The division's first General Officer Commanding (GOC) was Major General Vyvyan Evelegh, and the division comprised the 1st Infantry Brigade (Guards) and the 11th and 36th Infantry Brigades, along with supporting units. At its formation, the war establishment (the on-paper strength) of an infantry division was 17,298 men. The divisional insignia, representing a battle axe as used by a crusader, was selected by Evelegh. A variant of the insignia featured the battle axe on a circular background. All versions displayed the blade facing to the left. The insignia gave rise to the formation's nickname: Battleaxe Division. Historian Michael Chappell wrote that the insignia "was proudly worn on just about all forms of dress" and to the exclusion of other insignia such as "regimental titles, [and] arm-of-service strips".

The brigades selected for the division were all veterans of the fighting in France, and had taken part in the Dunkirk evacuation. Each had also been, since 1941, trained in amphibious warfare in anticipation of such an operation. During August, the formation held the only divisional exercise it conducted before it left the United Kingdom. This exercise, Operation Dryshod, intended to simulate an amphibious landing. However, due to a lack of available shipping, the exercise was largely academic. Henry Swanston Eeles comments "fields were selected which represented ships ... after moving over a road" the infantry ""landed" on the beaches on the other side of it." On 16 October, the division embarked for North Africa. En route, the division conducted extensive drills in embarking in landing craft in preparation for impending assault.

=== Operation Torch ===
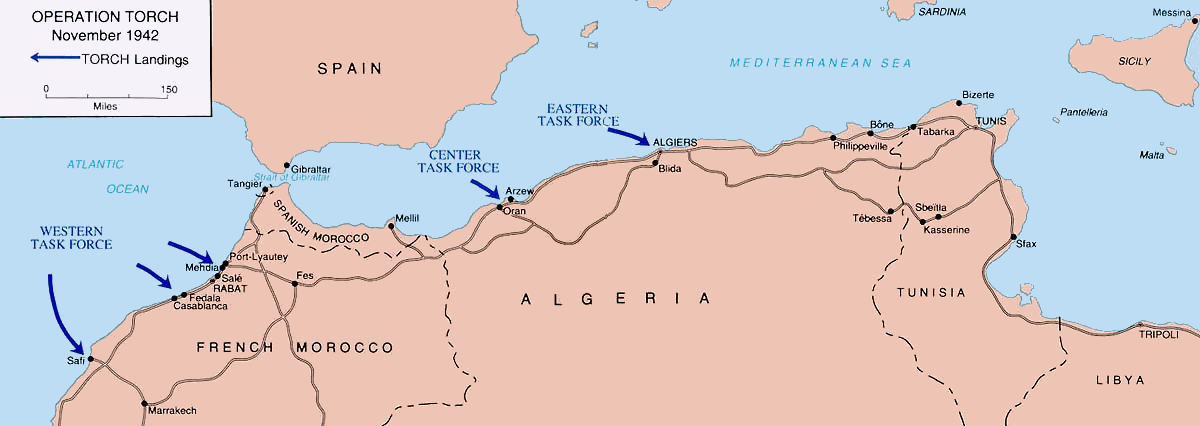
A map of the Operation Torch landings.

The plan for Torch called for American landings on the Atlantic coast of Morocco and near Algiers and Oran along Algeria's coastline. The British role in the initial landings called for an assault by elements of the 78th Infantry Division (9,000 men of the 11th and 36th Brigade Groups), near Algiers, alongside British Commandos and the U.S. 39th and 168th Regimental Combat Team (RCT). The assault called for the 11th Brigade Group to land to the west of Algiers and secure a beachhead, before advancing south to capture the Blida airfield and then push east to secure Bir Touta, southwest of Algiers, to control the road network. The 36th Brigade Group was to wait off shore in reserve. To cover the eastern flank of the landing, the 39th RCT was to land and advance south, while the 168th RCT was tasked with the capture of the city itself. Resistance by the French army and air force was expected to be slight, although the same could not be said of the Vichy navy. Once Algiers was secured, the Anglo-American force would come under the command of the British First Army and was tasked with rapidly moving eastwards to enter French Tunisia.

After sunset on 7 November, the invasion fleet moved into position. At 11:50, 45 landing craft took the 1st Battalion, East Surrey Regiment and the 5th (Huntingdonshire) Battalion, Northamptonshire Regiment towards the Algerian coastline. The first wave landed at 01:00, 8 November. No opposition was met by the 11th Brigade Group, who completed their landings by noon. Resistance was mixed at the other Anglo-American landing sites around Algiers. While this fighting took place, American Major General Charles W. Ryder entered the city and opened negotiations with General Alphonse Juin (C-in-C of French Forces in North Africa), who had been granted permission to do so by Admiral of the fleet François Darlan (C-in-C of the French Armed Forces). A ceasefire was agreed to, and Algiers was occupied at 19:00. Darlan issued a general ceasefire, across Morocco and Algeria, on 10 November ending all fighting.

Operation Torch had achieved complete surprise, and was a success. While some Allied commanders, such as Admiral Sir Andrew Cunningham, believed that landings should have been conducted along the Tunisian coastline such a move had been ruled out during the planning of the operation due to the threat of Axis aircraft, submarines, and a shortage of Allied shipping. On 9 November, Lieutenant General Sir Kenneth Anderson landed in Algiers and activated the British First Army. On 11 November, having sailed down the coast, the 36th Brigade Group landed in Algeria and captured Bougie. In response to the Allied landings, Axis troops and aircraft were flown into Tunisia where they met no opposition from local Vichy French forces. On 14 November, Anderson ordered the 78th Infantry Division to move east–along with other American and British forces within the First Army–to seize Bizerta and Tunis; aiming to achieve this goal before the end of the month, initiating the Run for Tunis.

=== Tunisian Campaign ===
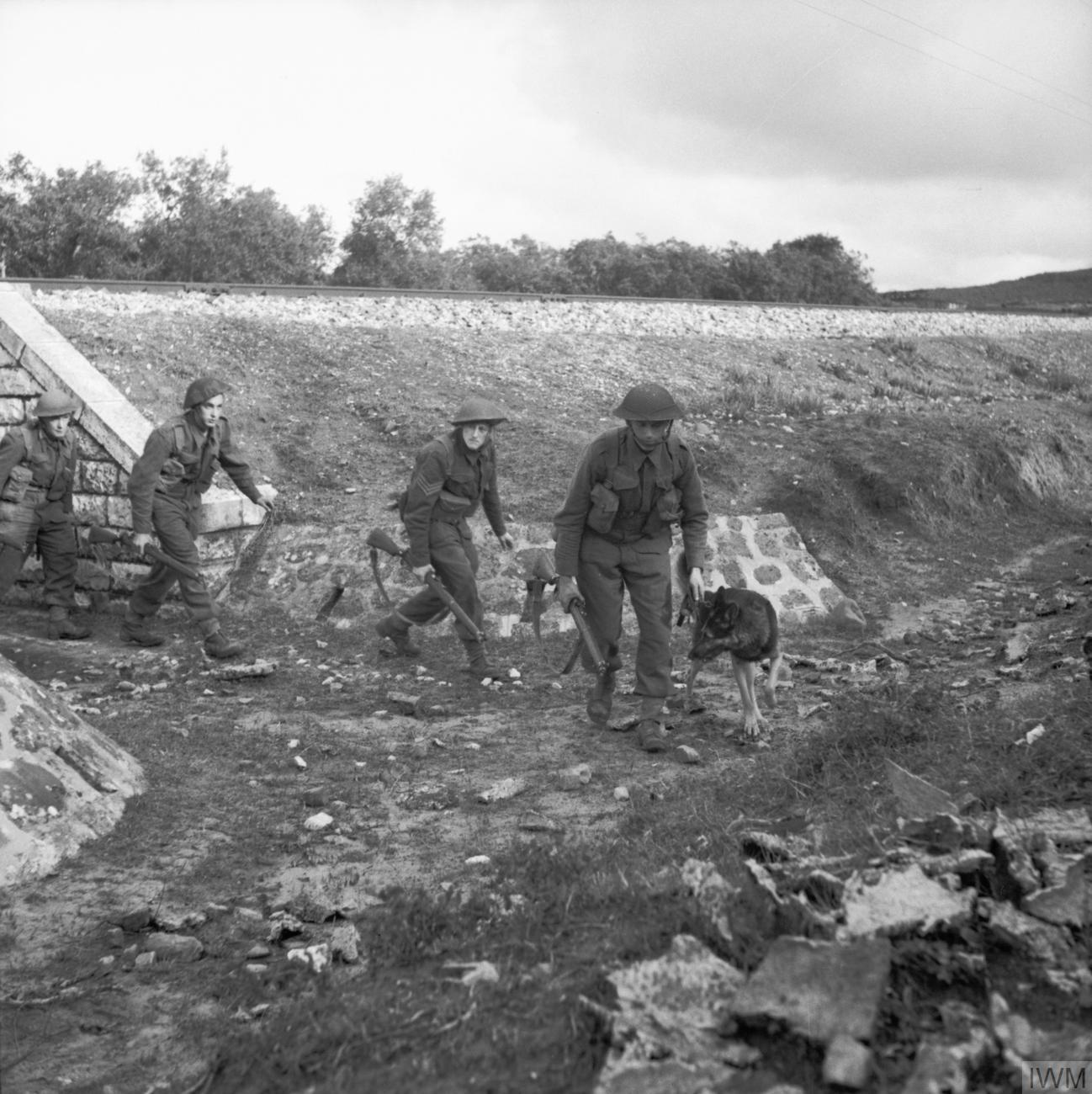
Men of the 6th Battalion, Queen's Own Royal West Kent Regiment on patrol with a dog, used to carry messages and for guard duties, Tunisia, December 1942.

Thereafter the division, assigned mainly to Lieutenant General Charles Allfrey's V Corps, had a prominent role in the Tunisian Campaign, gaining an excellent reputation. In December 1942 Major Wallace Le Patourel of the 2nd Battalion, Hampshire Regiment was awarded the 78th Division's first Victoria Cross (VC) of the war.

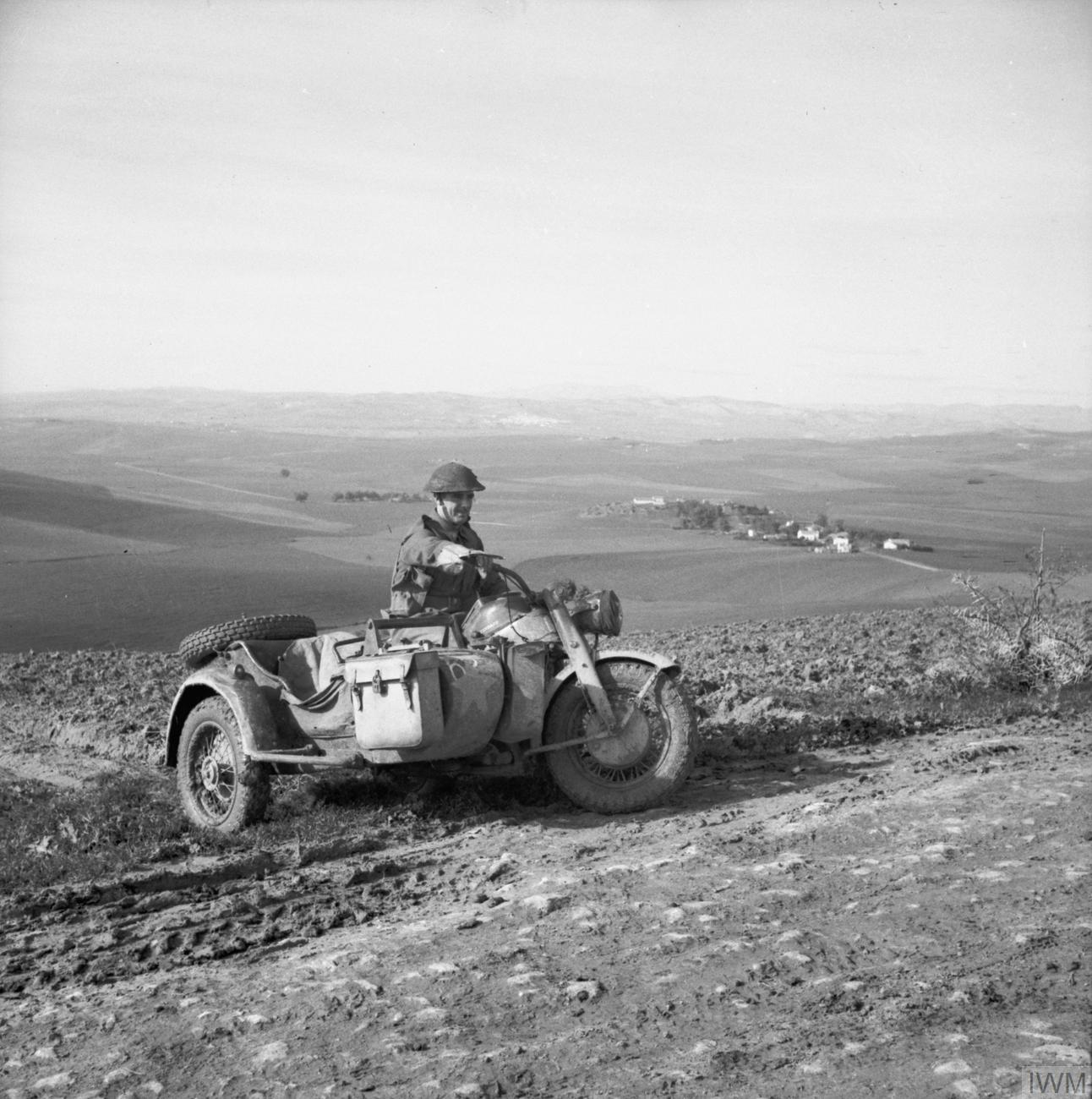
Private Stephens of the 5th Battalion, Northamptonshire Regiment rides a captured German motorcycle combination, Tunisia, 14 January 1943.

In February 1943 the 1st Infantry Brigade (Guards) was exchanged for the 38th (Irish) Infantry Brigade of the 6th Armoured Division. The 78th was to remain with this composition for the rest of the war. The division participated in the final stages of Operation Ochsenkopf and the subsequent operations, including the capture of Longstop Hill in April, which eventually led to the end of the campaign in Tunisia in mid-May, with nearly 250,000 Axis soldiers surrendering. It was during the capture of Longstop that the 78th Division gained its second VC of the war, belonging to Major John Anderson, Commanding Officer (CO) of the 8th Battalion, Argyll and Sutherland Highlanders.

With the end of hostilities in North Africa the 78th Division participated in the Victory Parade in Tunis and had a rest after nearly six months of continuous fighting. The First Army was disbanded soon afterwards, and the 78th Division was transferred to the veteran British Eighth Army, commanded by General Sir Bernard Montgomery.

=== Sicily and Italy ===
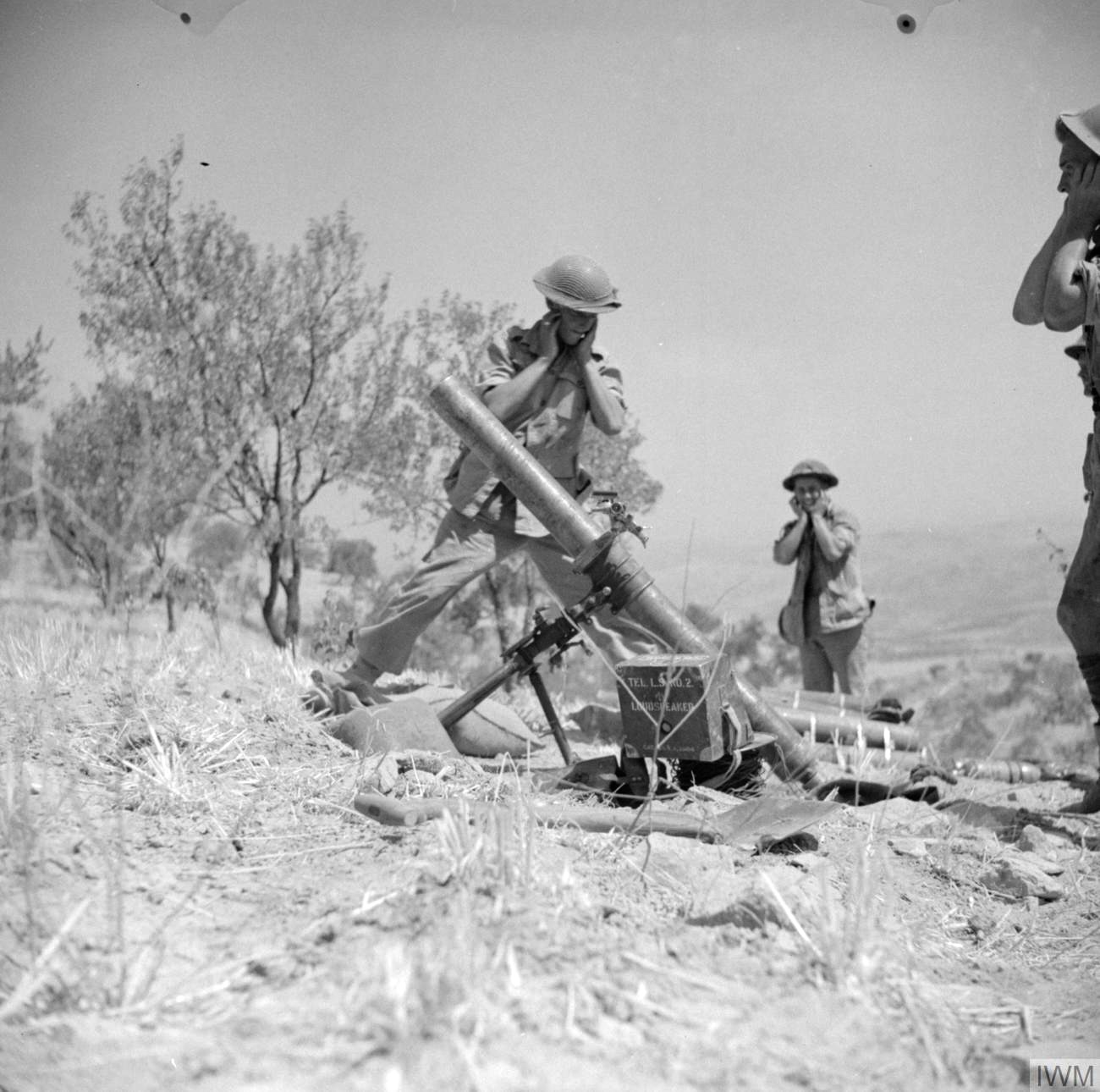
4.2-inch mortar of the 1st Battalion, Princess Louise's Kensington Regiment, 78th Division, in action near Adrano, Sicily, 6 August 1943.

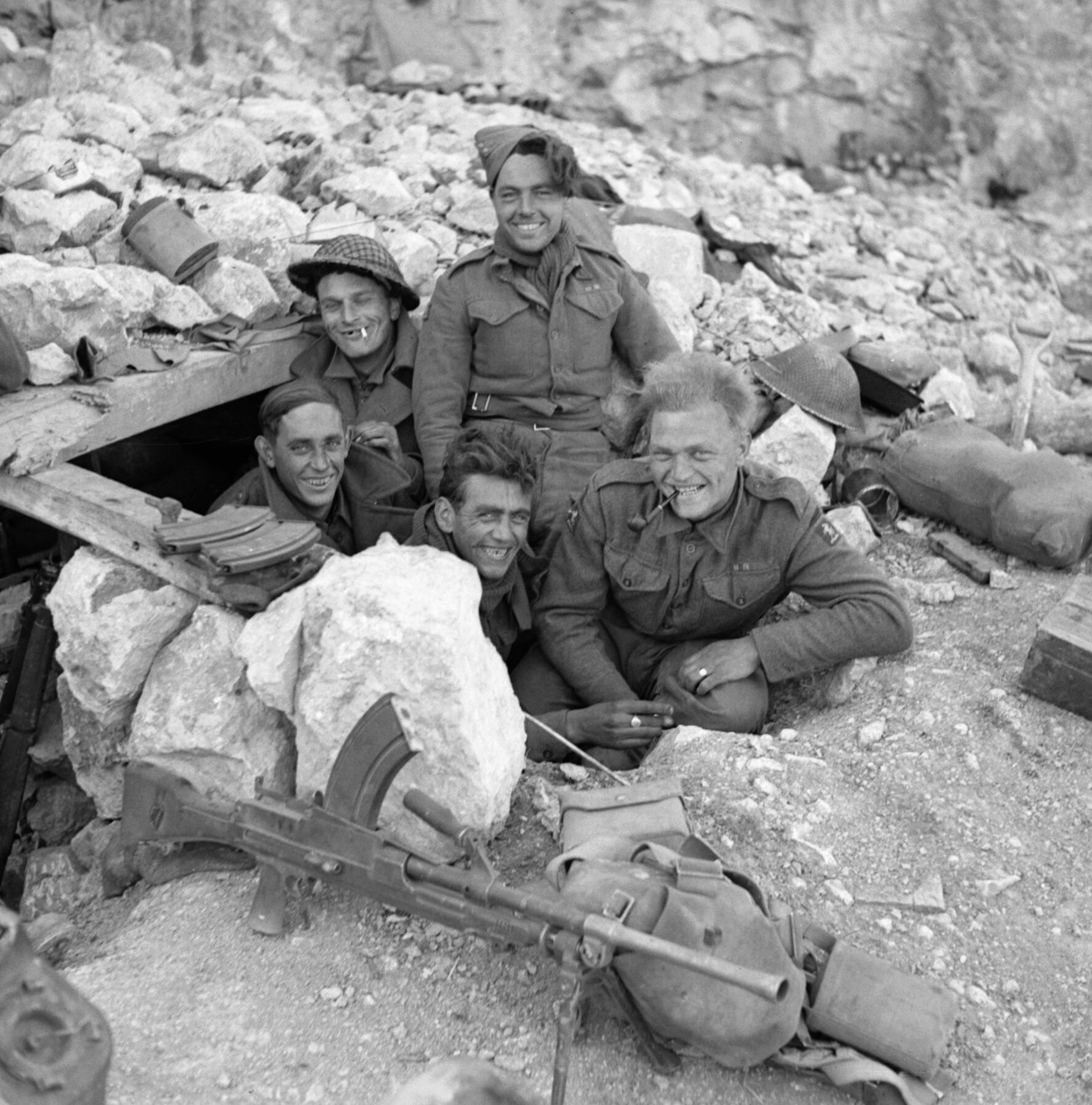
Men of the 6th Battalion, Queen's Own Royal West Kent Regiment in a dugout on Monastery Hill at Monte Cassino, Italy, 26 March 1944.

The 78th Division was initially held in reserve in North Africa for the Allied invasion of Sicily and spent the time bringing units up to strength with reinforcements, and training for future operations. However, Montgomery's Eighth Army, facing stiff German resistance, requested reinforcements and the 78th landed in Sicily in late July 1943, where it became part of Lieutenant General Sir Oliver Leese's XXX Corps. The division fought with distinction in Sicily, in particular at the Battle of Centuripe in August 1943.

The division then, after a short rest after the fighting in Sicily was over, went on to fight in the Italian campaign, landing in Italy in late September 1943, transferring back to Lieutenant General Allfrey's V Corps. Notable engagements in Italy (where, from December 1943 onwards the division was commanded by Major General Charles Keightley)) include the assaults on the Viktor Line (Battle of Termoli), the Moro River Campaign, the Barbara Line and the Winter Line as well as the Battle of Monte Cassino–where Fusilier Frank Jefferson of the 2nd Battalion, Lancashire Fusiliers earned the division's third and final VC of the war–and the Trasimene Line.

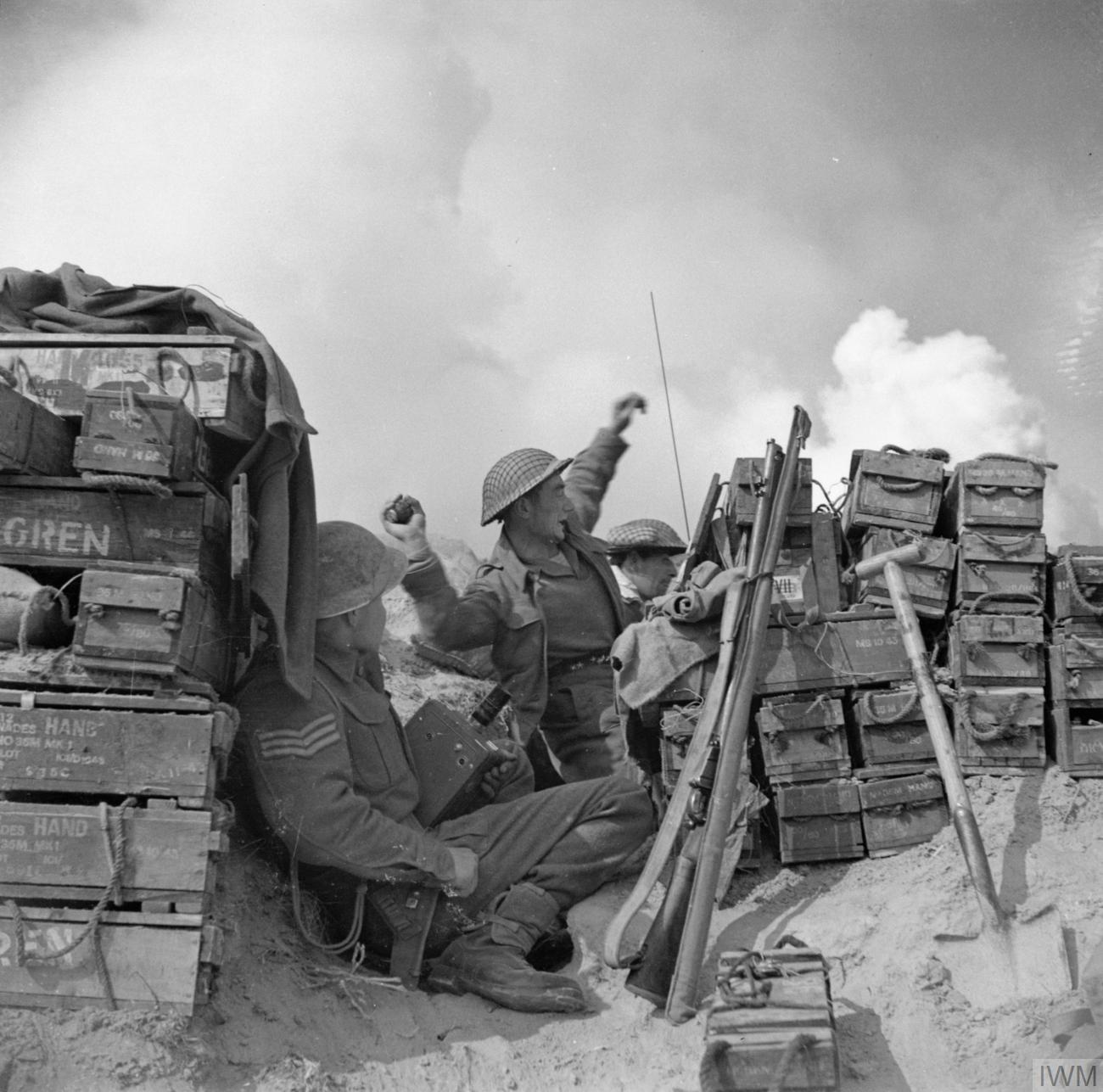
Infantrymen of the 2nd Battalion, London Irish Rifles hurl hand grenades during an attack on a German strongpoint on the southern bank of the River Senio, Italy, 22 March 1945.

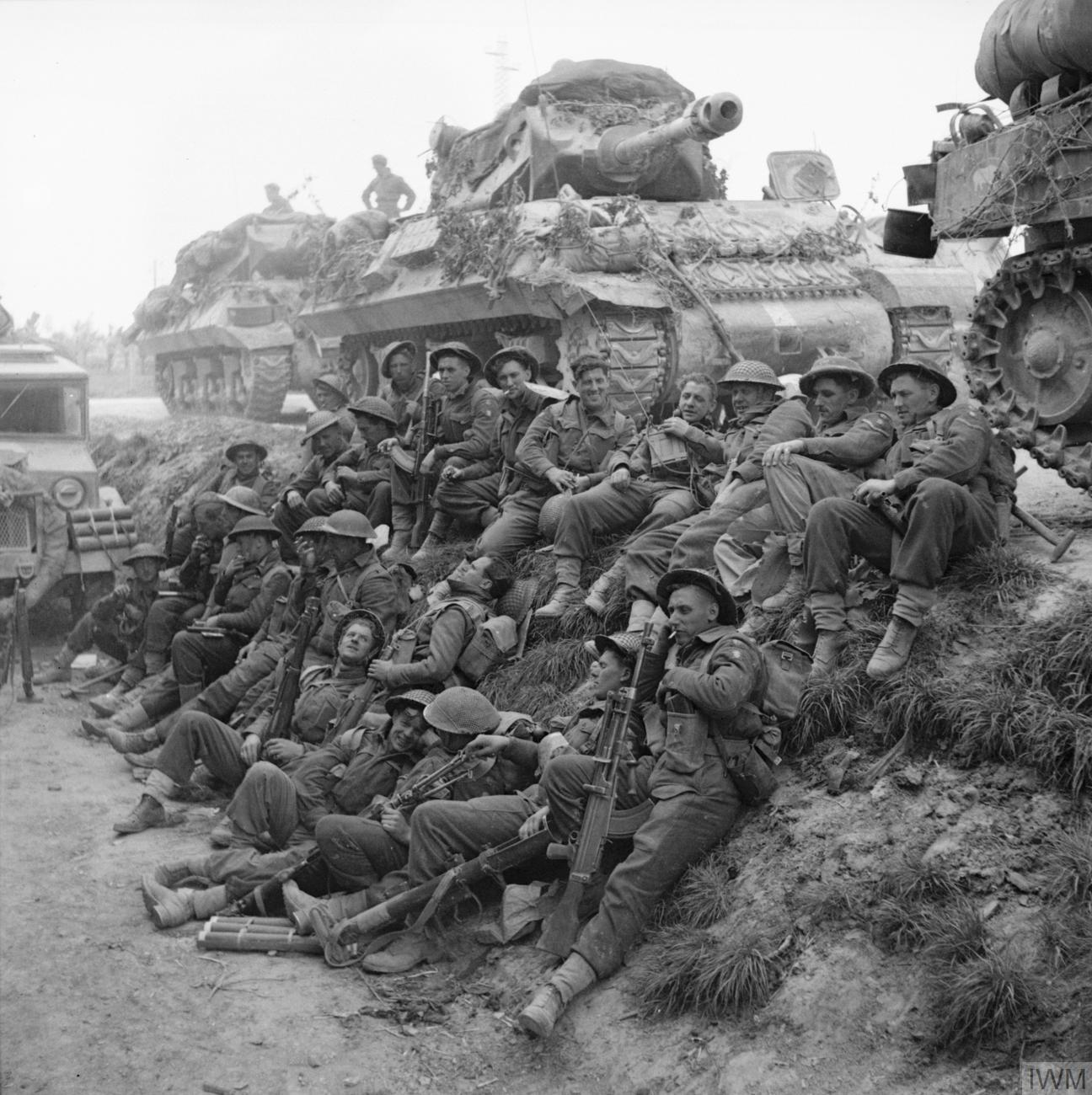
Men of the 2nd Battalion, Lancashire Fusiliers, take a rest by 17pdr SP Achilles self-propelled anti-tank guns, near Ferrara, 22 April 1945.

After this the 78th Division was, in July, withdrawn to the Middle East for a rest. The 78th Division gained notoriety when on rest in Egypt, in mid-1944, by starting the Cairo riots. Some divisional signs are known to have included 'Cairo' as a mock battle honour. However, the rest did not last long and the division, now commanded by Major General Donald Butterworth (soon replaced in October by Major General Keith Arbuthnott), soon returned to Italy, fighting around the Gothic Line, under the command of Lieutenant-General Sidney Kirkman's XIII Corps once again, which was then under the command of the U.S. Fifth Army. The division's second Italian winter was spent in the mountains, where morale was low. XIII Corps, stationed in the Apennine Mountains, suffered the highest desertion rate in Italy, with over 1,100 men going missing, more than 600, over half, coming from the 78th Division. The division transferred back to the Eighth Army, now commanded by Lieutenant General Sir Richard McCreery, in January 1945, coming under the command of V Corps, now under Lieutenant General Keightley, the 78th Division's former commander. The division's final battle was in the Battle of the Argenta Gap, part of the Spring 1945 offensive in Italy where the division ended the war in Austria.

=== Reputation ===
The 78th Division was considered to be one of the best divisions of the British Army during the Second World War, due to its high morale and excellent leadership, and General Montgomery believed it to be the best mountain warfare division in the British Eighth Army. This view was shared by many senior commanders, such as Lieutenant General Charles Allfrey, commander of V Corps, who claimed the 78th Division was the "finest fighting division of any that I had the privilege to have in 'V' Corps."

== General officers commanding ==
Appointed	General officer commanding
14 June 1942	Major-General Vyvyan Evelegh
13 December 1943	Major-General Charles Keightley
9 July 1944	Brigadier Robert Keith Arbuthnott (acting)
30 July 1944	Major-General Charles Keightley
1 August 1944	Brigadier Robert Keith Arbuthnott (acting)
21 August 1944	Major-General Donald Clunes Butterworth
10 October 1944	Brigadier Robert Keith Arbuthnott (acting)
17 November 1944	Major-General Robert Keith Arbuthnott
1946	Major-General J. F. B. Combe

== Order of battle ==
78th Infantry Division (1942–1945)

1st Infantry Brigade (Guards)(until 15 March 1943)

- 3rd Battalion, Grenadier Guards
- 2nd Battalion, Coldstream Guards
- 2nd Battalion, Hampshire Regiment (until 25 November 1942, then between 18 February 1943 until 22 February 1943
- 8th Battalion, Argyll and Sutherland Highlanders (from 25 December 1942 until 16 February 1943)

11th Infantry Brigade

- 2nd Battalion, Lancashire Fusiliers
- 1st Battalion, East Surrey Regiment
- 5th (Huntingdonshire) Battalion, Northamptonshire Regiment

36th Infantry Brigade

- 5th Battalion, Buffs (Royal East Kent Regiment)
- 6th Battalion, Queen's Own Royal West Kent Regiment
- 7th Battalion, Queen's Own Royal West Kent Regiment (until 20 August 1942)
- 8th Battalion, Argyll and Sutherland Highlanders (from 21 August until 25 December 1942, then between 16 February 1943 and 27 February 1943, finally from 24 March until the end of the war.)

38th (Irish) Infantry Brigade (from 15 March 1943)

- 2nd Battalion, London Irish Rifles
- 1st Battalion, Royal Irish Fusiliers
- 6th Battalion, Royal Inniskilling Fusiliers (disbanded 5 August 1944 due to lack of manpower and replaced by 2nd Bn)
- 2nd Battalion, Royal Inniskilling Fusiliers (from 26 July 1944)

Divisional Troops

- 17th Field Regiment, Royal Artillery (until 9 July 1945)
- 132nd (Welsh) Field Regiment, Royal Artillery
- 138th (City of London) Field Regiment, Royal Artillery
- 154th Field Regiment, Royal Artillery (from 10 July 1945)
- 64th (Queen's Own Royal Glasgow Yeomanry) Anti-Tank Regiment, Royal Artillery
- 49th Light Anti-Aircraft Regiment, Royal Artillery (until 6 November 1944)
- 78th Divisional Engineers, Royal Engineers
  - 214th Field Company, Royal Engineers
  - 237th Field Company, Royal Engineers
  - 256th Field Company, Royal Engineers
  - 281st Field Park Company, Royal Engineers
  - 21st Bridging Platoon, Royal Engineers
- 78th Divisional Signals, Royal Corps of Signals
- 1st Battalion, Princess Louise's Kensington Regiment (From 16 June 1943, as the division's support battalion. Re-organized as the division's machine gun battalion on 13 June 1944.)
- 29th Independent Squadron, Reconnaissance Corps (until 23 August 1942)
- 56th Reconnaissance Regiment, Reconnaissance Corps (1 September 1942, from 1 January 1944 "56th Reconnaissance Regiment, RAC")

== See also ==
- List of British divisions in World War II

== Notes ==
Footnotes

Citations
