= Charles Keightley =

British Army general and Governor of Gibraltar

General Sir Charles Keightley GCB GBE DSO DL
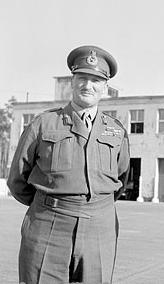
- Keightley in 1949
- Born: 24 June 1901; Croydon, London, England
- Died: 17 June 1974 (aged 72); Salisbury, Wiltshire, England
- Military career
- Allegiance: United Kingdom
- Branch: British Army
- Service years: 1921–1957
- Rank: General
- Service number: 14936
- Units: 5th Dragoon Guards; 5th Royal Inniskilling Dragoon Guards
- Commands: Gibraltar; Far East Land Forces; British Army of the Rhine; V Corps; 78th Infantry Division; 6th Armoured Division; 11th Armoured Division; 30th Armoured Brigade
- Conflicts: Second World War; Suez Crisis
- Awards: Knight Grand Cross of the Order of the Bath; Knight Grand Cross of the Order of the British Empire; Companion of the Distinguished Service Order; Mentioned in Despatches (2); Grand Officer of the Legion of Honour (France); Commander of the Legion of Merit (United States)
- Other work: Governor of Gibraltar (1958–1962); Deputy Lieutenant of the county of Dorset. (29 October 1970 – 17 June 1974)

General Sir Charles Frederic Keightley, GCB, GBE, DSO, DL (24 June 1901 – 17 June 1974) was a senior British Army officer who served during and following the Second World War. After serving with distinction during the Second World War – becoming, in 1944, the youngest corps commander in the British Army – he had a distinguished postwar career and was the Governor of Gibraltar from 1958 to 1962.

Since Keightley's death, there has been much scrutiny of his role in the repatriation of Cossacks after World War II.

== Early life and military career ==
Keightley was born on 24 June 1901 at Anerley near Croydon, the only surviving son of Rev. Charles Albert Keightley, the local vicar, and his wife, Kathleen Ross. His early education was at Marlborough College.

He graduated from the Royal Military College, Sandhurst, was commissioned as a second lieutenant in December 1921 into the 5th Dragoon Guards (Princess Charlotte of Wales's) which through amalgamation with the 6th (Inniskilling) Dragoons became the 5th/6th Dragoons the following year, and later the 5th Royal Inniskilling Dragoon Guards. He was promoted lieutenant at the end of 1923 and captain in April 1932, having served three years as the regiment's adjutant. He attended the Staff College, Camberley from 1935 to 1936, and after a staff posting was in October 1937 appointed a brigade major of a mechanised cavalry brigade in Egypt. He was able, however, in November to take part in the coronation of King George VI in London as a member of the procession accompanying the King and Queen. In September 1938 his brigade became part of the new Mobile Division in Egypt commanded by the influential Percy Hobart.

Keightley was able to benefit from Hobart's tutelage for only a brief period and, having been promoted to the rank of major, he was appointed in December 1938 to be an instructor at the Staff College, Camberley. Accompanying his new position was another promotion, this time to the local rank of lieutenant-colonel.

== Second World War ==
In 1940, during the Second World War, he was appointed as Assistant Adjutant & Quartermaster General (chief administrative officer) of the 1st Armoured Division, then commanded by Major-General Roger Evans, during that division's deployment to France. After the evacuation from France the division reformed back in England. On 13 May 1941, Keightley, on promotion to the acting rank of brigadier, was given command of the 30th Armoured Brigade, part of the 11th Armoured Division, which by this time was commanded by Major-General Percy Hobart, his former mentor. He was appointed an Officer of the Order of the British Empire in July 1941.

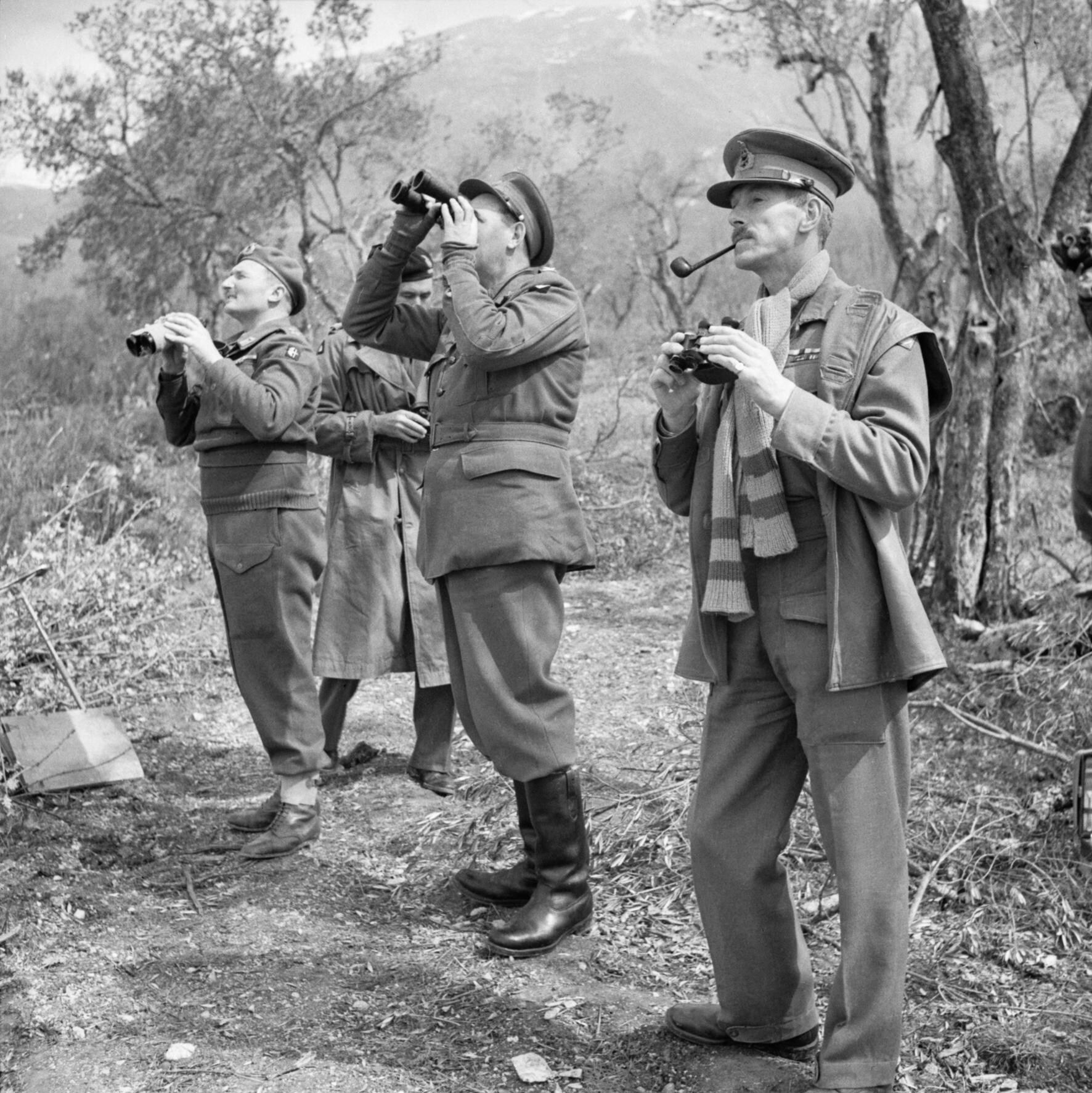
From left to right: Charles Keightley, GOC 78th Infantry Division, Sir Richard McCreery, GOC X Corps, Sir Oliver Leese, GOC Eighth Army, and Sidney Kirkman, GOC XIII Corps, all watching an Allied bombing raid on Monte Cassino, 15 March 1944.

In late December 1941 he was promoted to acting major-general to become Commandant of the Royal Armoured Corps Training Establishment. After only five months in this job he was briefly given command on 21 April 1942 of the 11th Armoured Division, which was then based in the United Kingdom and then on 19 May 1942 went to command the 6th Armoured Division and led it with distinction throughout the Tunisian Campaign, elements landing in French North Africa in November as part of Operation Torch. He was made a Companion of the Order of the Bath for his services in Tunisia and also was awarded the Legion of Merit by the United States government. His permanent rank was advanced from major to lieutenant colonel in September 1943 and again to colonel in April 1944.

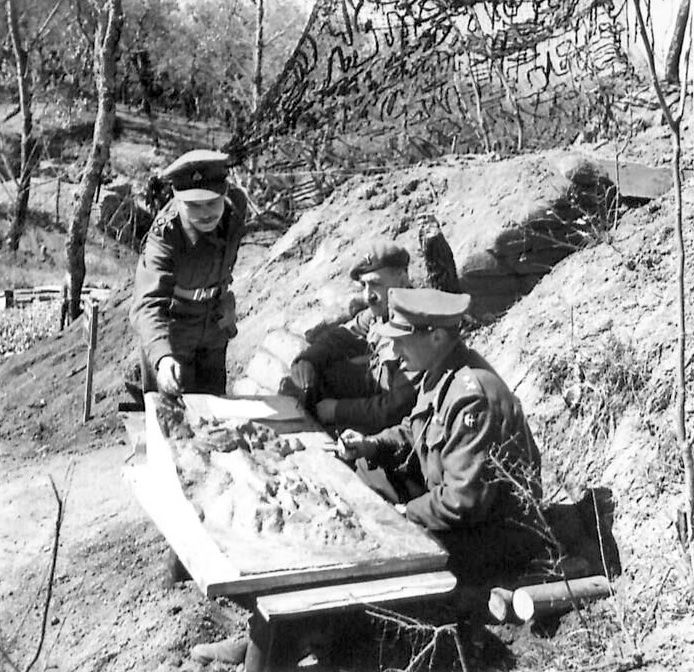
Major-General Charles Keightley (right), GOC 78th Infantry Division, at work, 2 April 1944. On a table outside his dug-out is a model of the Cassino area. Lieutenant. R. Grimshaw (left) is pointing out a feature to Lieutenant-Colonel D. E. P. Hodgson, Welsh Guards (middle).

In December 1943 he exchanged commands with Major-General Vyvyan Evelegh, the General officer commanding (GOC) of the 78th Infantry Division, which had fought alongside the 6th Armoured in Tunisia was then serving in Italy, and which became his first infantry command. He was appointed a Companion of the Distinguished Service Order in August 1944 and his success as a commander of both armoured and infantry divisions led to his promotion in August 1944 to acting lieutenant-general when he was given command of the British Eighth Army's V Corps, succeeding Lieutenant General Charles Allfrey, in Italy. At the age of 43 he was the youngest officer in the British Army during the Second World War to command a corps in action. Toby Low, the youngest brigadier in the British Army, was Keightley's Brigadier General Staff (BGS). He commanded this corps during Operation Olive, the offensive on the Gothic Line in the autumn of 1944, and also during the final spring offensive in April 1945, when it took a lead role in forcing the Argenta Gap. The corps moved into Austria with the surrender of the German Forces and forces that were fighting on the German side. On 8 May 1945, he signed a demarcation agreement with the Bulgarian First Army commander, General Vladimir Stoychev in Klagenfurt.

In East Tyrol and Carinthia, Keightley's army received the surrender of the Cossack military collaborators: the Cossack leadership of Peter Krasnov, Sultan Klych-Girey, and Andrei Shkuro; the Kazachi Stan mobile encampment; and the XVth SS Cossack Cavalry Corps under Helmuth von Pannwitz. At the Yalta Conference, the British committed themselves to return Soviet citizens to the Soviet Union. After consultation with Harold Macmillan, Keightley handed over these prisoners and their families regardless of their nationality, including people with French, German, Yugoslav or Nansen passports. The prisoners were transferred to SMERSH at Judenburg; some were convicted of treason and/or war crimes and were executed, while others were sent to Gulags.

In mid-1945, Keightley was appointed Knight Commander of the Order of the British Empire. His knighthood was bestowed during planning for an invasion of the Japanese home islands; the British Army nominated Keighley to lead a proposed Commonwealth Corps, comprised initially of infantry divisions from the Australian, British and Canadian armies. However, the Australian government believed that the corps should be led by an officer with experience fighting the Japanese and instead proposed Lieutenant-General Sir Leslie Morshead for the command. The corps was to have landed near Tokyo, in early 1946. However, the war ended before the details of the corps were finalised.

== Post-war ==
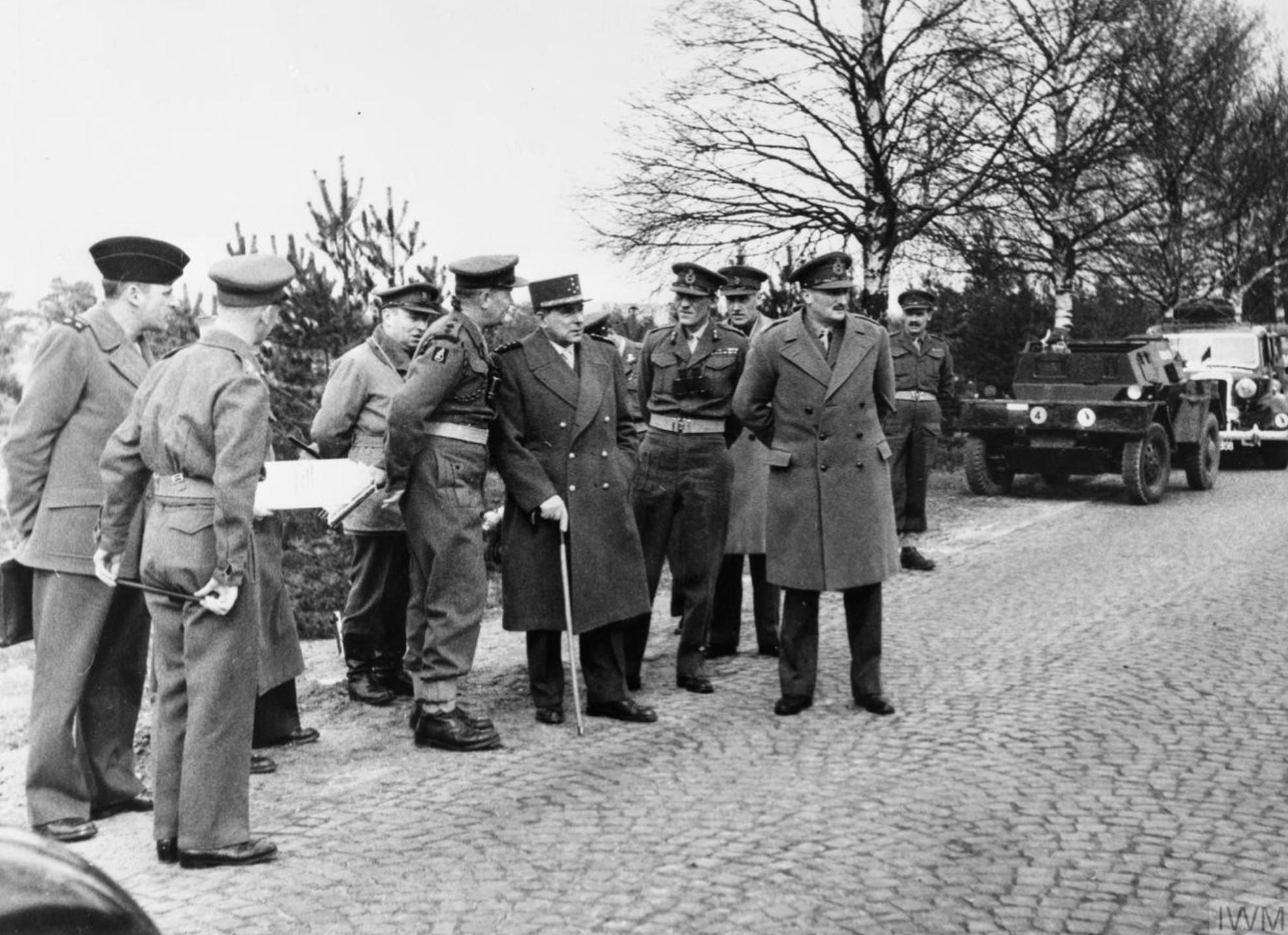
Senior British and French Army officers observe a NATO exercise in Germany, 1950. Lieutenant Colonel Frederick Stephens, CO 1st Battalion, The Rifle Brigade explains the exercise to a group of officers including Général d'armée Jean de Lattre de Tassigny, Major General Robert Arkwright, GOC 7th Armoured Division and Lieutenant General Sir Charles Keightley, C-in-C British Army of the Rhine.

In 1946, Keightley left Austria and reverted to his permanent rank of major-general (to which he had received promotion in February 1945), to become Director of Military Training at the War Office. In 1948, he became the Military Secretary to Manny Shinwell, then the Secretary of State for War, gaining the permanent rank of lieutenant-general. On 21 September 1949, he became Commander-in-chief (C-in-C) of the British Army of the Rhine (BAOR) in Germany relinquishing the role in April 1951. He was appointed a Knight Commander of the Order of the Bath during his time in the post.

In May 1951, he became the C-in-C Far East Land Forces in the rank of general. In September 1953, he was appointed C-in-C Middle East Land Forces. Also in 1953 Keightley received the honorary appointment of Aide-de-camp general to the Queen for a three-year tenure. His tenure at Middle East Land Forces included the period of the Suez Crisis and Keightley was C-in-C of Operation Musketeer in 1956. For his services during the period October to December 1956 he was advanced to Knight Grand Cross of the Order of the British Empire and also received the Legion of Honour (Grand Officer) from the French government. In January 1957 he relinquished his Middle East Command and retired from the army that August.

From 23 November 1947 to 23 November 1957, he held the honorary post of Colonel of the 5th Royal Inniskilling Dragoon Guards. He also held the honorary post of Colonel Commandant, Royal Armoured Corps, Cavalry Wing until April 1968.

In retirement Keightley was appointed Governor and Commander-in-Chief of Gibraltar, a post he held from May 1958 until October 1962 when he retired from the army a second time since his role as Commander-in-Chief, although not paid for out of the army's budget, had technically returned him to active duty. From 1958 he served a term as Honorary Colonel of the Royal Gibraltar Regiment.

From 1963 he was appointed Member of the Royal Patriotic Fund Corporation.

He died in Salisbury, Wiltshire, at Salisbury General Infirmary on 17 June 1974, a week before his seventy-third birthday.

== Family ==
Keightley was married to Joan Lydia Smyth-Osbourne of Iddlesleigh in Devon in 1932. They had two sons, of which Richard was also a senior army officer, becoming Commandant of Sandhurst.

== Recognition ==
Keightley Way, a road and tunnel in Gibraltar was named in his honour.

== Publications ==
- Keightley, Charles (1957). Despatch by General Sir Charles F. Keightley GCB GBE DSO, Commander in Chief Allied Forces. Operations in Egypt, November to December 1956. London: Ministry of Defence. published in "No. 41172". The London Gazette. 10 September 1957. pp. 5327–5337.

== Bibliography ==
- Blaxland, Gregory (1977). The Plain Cook and the Great Showman: The First and Eighth Armies in North Africa. Kimber. ISBN 0-7183-0185-4.
- Blaxland, Gregory (1979). Alexander's Generals (the Italian Campaign 1944–1945). London: William Kimber & Co. ISBN 0-7183-0386-5.
- Mead, Richard (2007). Churchill's Lions: a biographical guide to the key British generals of World War II. Stroud (UK): Spellmount. ISBN 978-1-86227-431-0.
- Smart, Nick (2005). Biographical Dictionary of British Generals of the Second World War. Barnsley, South Yorkshire: Pen and Sword Books. ISBN 1844150496.

Military offices
Preceded by Percy Hobart	GOC 11th Armoured Division; April–May 1942	Succeeded by Percy Hobart
Preceded by Charles Gairdner	GOC 6th Armoured Division; 1942–1943	Succeeded by Vyvyan Evelegh
Preceded by Vyvyan Evelegh	GOC 78th Infantry Division; 1943–1944	Succeeded by Donald Butterworth
Preceded by Charles Allfrey	GOC V Corps; 1944–1945	Post disbanded
Preceded by Sir Frederick Browning	Military Secretary; 1948	Succeeded by Sir Robert Mansergh
Preceded by Sir Brian Horrocks	C-in-C British Army of the Rhine; 1948–1951	Succeeded by Sir John Harding
Preceded by Sir John Harding	C-in-C Far East Land Forces; 1951–1953	Succeeded by Sir Charles Loewen
Preceded by Sir Cameron Nicholson	C-in-C Middle East Land Forces; 1953–1957	Succeeded by Sir Geoffrey Bourne
Government offices
Preceded by Sir Harold Redman	Governor of Gibraltar; 1958–1962	Succeeded by Sir Alfred Ward
