= Daril Watson =

British Army general (1888–1967)

General Sir Daril Watson GCB CBE MC
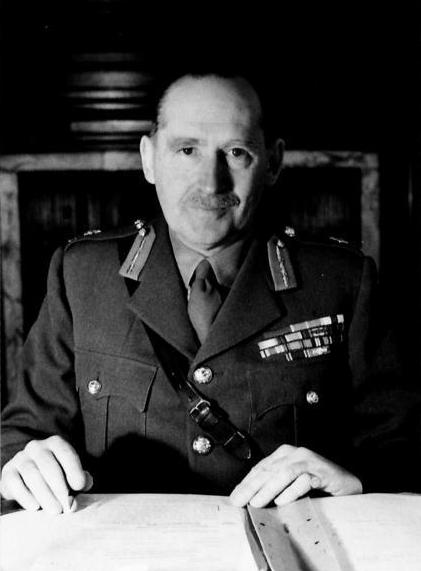
- Lieutenant-General Sir Daril Watson in 1946
- Born: 17 October 1888; Edmonton, London, England
- Died: 1 July 1967 (aged 78); Hadlow Down, Uckfield, East Sussex, England
- Military career
- Allegiance: United Kingdom
- Branch: British Army
- Service years: 1914–1947
- Rank: General
- Service number: 9758
- Units: Royal Fusiliers; Highland Light Infantry; Duke of Cornwall's Light Infantry
- Commands: Western Command (1944–1946); 2nd Infantry Division (1940–1941); Senior Officers' School, Belgaum (1937–1939); 1st Battalion, Duke of Cornwall's Light Infantry (1934–1937)
- Conflicts: First World War; Second World War
- Awards: Knight Grand Cross of the Order of the Bath; Commander of the Order of the British Empire; Military Cross; Mentioned in Despatches; Commander of the Legion of Merit (United States)

General Sir Daril Gerard Watson, GCB, CBE, MC (17 October 1888 − 1 July 1967) was a senior British Army officer who saw service during both the First and Second World Wars.

== Military career ==
Born on 17 October 1888, Daril Watson was educated at Mercers' School and, upon the outbreak of the First World War in August 1914, enlisted into the British Army, joining the 10th Battalion, Royal Fusiliers. He was commissioned into the Highland Light Infantry the following year, serving with the regiment's 12th Battalion, and was awarded the Military Cross in 1917, the same year of his marriage.

After attending the Staff College, Camberley from 1924 to 1925, Watson transferred to the Duke of Cornwall's Light Infantry (DCLI) in 1928, becoming commanding officer of the 1st Battalion, DCLI in 1934. In 1937 he was appointed commandant of the Senior Officers' School, Belgaum, in India.

Watson saw service in the Second World War, initially as a brigadier on the General Staff at Eastern Command and then moving on to the General Staff of III Corps. He was appointed General Officer Commanding 2nd Infantry Division in India in 1940 and Director of Staff Duties at the War Office in 1941. In 1942 he was appointed Assistant Chief of the Imperial General Staff and then Deputy Adjutant General. In 1944 he moved on to be General Officer Commanding-in-Chief for Western Command.

Promoted to general on 17 August 1946, Watson became Quartermaster-General to the Forces in 1946 and retired in 1947.

During retirement Watson became a member of the board of the British Transport Commission.

== Bibliography ==
- Smart, Nick (2005). Biographical Dictionary of British Generals of the Second World War. Barnsley: Pen and Sword Books. ISBN 1844150496.

Military offices
Preceded by Alfred Evans-Gwynne	Commandant of the Senior Officers' School, Belgaum; 1937–1939	Succeeded by William Slim
Preceded by Noel Irwin	GOC 2nd Infantry Division; 1940–1941	Succeeded by John Grover
Preceded by Gordon Macready	Assistant Chief of the Imperial General Staff; July–December 1942	Succeeded by John Evetts
Preceded by Sir Edmond Schreiber	GOC-in-C Western Command; 1944–1946	Succeeded by Sir Brian Horrocks
Preceded by Sir Thomas Riddell-Webster	Quartermaster-General to the Forces; 1946–1947	Succeeded by Sir Sidney Kirkman
Honorary titles
Preceded by Sir Walter Venning	Colonel of the Duke of Cornwall's Light Infantry; 1947–1953	Succeeded by Vyvyan Evelegh
