= Maurice Johnston (British Army officer) =

British army officer (1929–2024)

Lieutenant-General Sir Maurice Johnston KCB CVO OBE
- Born: 27 October 1929
- Died: 10 November 2024 (aged 95)
- Military career
- Allegiance: United Kingdom
- Branch: British Army
- Service years: 1949–1982
- Rank: Lieutenant-General
- Service number: 403506
- Unit: Royal Artillery
- Commands: 20th Armoured Brigade; 1st The Queen's Dragoon Guards
- Conflicts: Indonesia–Malaysia confrontation The Troubles
- Awards: Knight Commander of the Order of the Bath; Commander of the Royal Victorian Order; Officer of the Order of the British Empire
- Other work: Lord Lieutenant of Wiltshire

Lieutenant-General Sir Maurice Robert Johnston, KCB, CVO, OBE (27 October 1929 – 10 November 2024) was a British Army officer. He served as Deputy Chief of the Defence Staff (Operational Requirements) from 1981 to 1982, and Lord Lieutenant of Wiltshire from 1996 to 2004.

== Early life and army career ==
The son of Brigadier Allen Leigh Johnston OBE and of his wife Gertrude Geraldine Templer, Johnston was born on 27 October 1929. He was educated at Wellington College and the Royal Military Academy Sandhurst. From Sandhurst he was commissioned into the Royal Artillery in 1949, promoted lieutenant in 1951, and captain in 1955, when he also transferred to The Queen's Bays. He served in Germany, Egypt, Jordan, Libya, Northern Ireland, and Borneo before being posted as an instructor at the Army Staff College from 1965 to 1967. He was promoted major in 1962 and lieutenant colonel in 1967. He was Military Assistant to the Chief of the General Staff from 1968 to 1971 and commanding officer the 1st The Queen's Dragoon Guards, 1971 to 1973, before promotion to brigadier, and command of the 20th Armoured Brigade from 1973 to 1975. He was Brigadier (General Staff) at Headquarters UK Land Forces from 1977 to 1978, joined the Senior Directing Staff of the Royal College of Defence Studies in 1979, with acting promotion to major general, was appointed Assistant Chief of the General Staff in 1980, his rank was made substantive in 1980, and Chief of the Defence Staff (Operational Requirements) in 1981, with promotion to lieutenant general, before retiring in 1984.

== Business career ==
After retirement from the British Army in 1982, Johnston was managing director of Freshglen Limited (1984 to 1985) and of Unit Security Limited (1985 to 1988), then Chairman of Secondary Resources PLC, 1988 to 1991 and of Detention Corporation, 1988 to 1994. He was also a director of Partek Cargotec Limited from 1984, and of Shorrock Guards Limited from 1988 to 1991.

== Voluntary work ==
Johnston served as a governor of Dauntsey's School since 1987 and was also a governor of St Mary's, Calne, from 1988 to 1994, as well as supporting Wiltshire County Scouts. He was appointed a Deputy Lieutenant of Wiltshire in 1990, as High Sheriff of Wiltshire for 1993–1994, and served as Lord Lieutenant of Wiltshire from 1996 to 2004. As Lord Lieutenant of Wiltshire, he was an ex officio member of the Court of the University of Southampton.

== Personal life and death ==
Johnston married Belinda Mary Sladen in 1960, and they had one son and one daughter.

In 2004, Johnston was reported to be living at Ivy House, Worton, near Devizes.

Johnston died at home on 10 November 2024, at the age of 95.

== Publications ==
- Johnston, Sir Maurice, 'More Power to the Centre: MOD Reorganisation' in RUSI Journal, March 1983

== Honours ==
- Officer of the Order of the British Empire (OBE), 1971 New Year Honours
- Knight Commander of the Order of the Bath (KCB), 1982 New Year Honours
- Colonel of the 1st The Queen's Dragoon Guards, 1986–1991
- Knight of the Venerable Order of Saint John, 1996
- Honorary Freeman of the Borough of Swindon, 2004
- Commander of the Royal Victorian Order, 2005
- Patron of the Shaw Trust

Military offices
Preceded by Ian Baker	Assistant Chief of the General Staff; January 1980 – December 1980	Succeeded by Robert Pascoe
Preceded by Sir Stephen Berthon	Deputy Chief of the Defence Staff (Operational Requirements); 1981–1983	Succeeded by Sir Donald Hall
Honorary titles
Preceded by Sir Roland Gibbs	Lord Lieutenant of Wiltshire; 1996–2004	Succeeded by John Bush
