= John Kennedy (British Army officer, born 1893) =

Major-General Sir John Kennedy GCMG KCVO KBE CB MC
- Born: 31 August 1893; Portpatrick, Wigtownshire, Scotland
- Died: 15 June 1970 (aged 76); Broxmouth House, Dunbar, East Lothian, Scotland
- Military career
- Allegiance: United Kingdom
- Branch: Royal Navy; British Army
- Service years: 1911–1946
- Rank: Major-General
- Service number: 13614
- Units: Royal Garrison Artillery; Royal Artillery
- Conflicts: First World War; Russian Civil War; Second World War
- Awards: Knight Grand Cross of the Order of St Michael and St George; Knight Commander of the Royal Victorian Order; Knight Commander of the Order of the British Empire; Companion of the Order of the Bath; Military Cross; Mentioned in Despatches

Major-General Sir John Noble Kennedy, GCMG, KCVO, KBE, CB, MC (31 August 1893 – 15 June 1970) was a senior British Army officer who served as Assistant Chief of the Imperial General Staff during the Second World War.

== Early life ==
Kennedy was born on 31 August 1893 in Portpatrick, the son of the Minister James Russell Kennedy and his wife Sarah.

== Military career ==
Kennedy joined the Royal Navy in 1911 and then, after attending the Royal Military Academy, Woolwich, transferred to the Royal Garrison Artillery in July 1915, shortly after the outbreak of the First World War. He saw action in France, Flanders and Egypt. He was awarded the Military Cross during his service, the citation for which reads:

For conspicuous gallantry in action. He, with three men, established an observation post in "No Man's Land," and under very heavy hostile fire directed the fire of his Battery most successfully. He has on many previous occasions done fine work.

Kennedy then served with the British Military Mission in South Russia during the Russian Civil War, for which he was mentioned in despatches.

After attending the Staff College, Camberley, from 1921 to 1922 (returning there as an instructor from 1931 to 1934), Kennedy, after relinquishing his post of GSO2 at the War Office in London on 22 October 1936, was appointed Deputy Director of Military Operations at the War Office in 1938.

He also served in the Second World War as Director of Plans at the War Office from 1939, Commander Royal Artillery for the 52nd Division from early 1940 and as Director of Military Operations at the War Office from later that year. He went on to be Assistant Chief of the Imperial General Staff in October 1943 until February 1945. He was Governor of Southern Rhodesia from 1947 to 1953.

== Family ==
In 1926 Kennedy married Isabella Rosamond Georgiana Joicey-Cecil (1901–1941). Kennedy married Catherine Fordham (1905–1969) in 1942; on 2 January 1939 Fordham had been appointed lady-in-waiting to Princess Helena Victoria of Schleswig-Holstein-Sonderburg-Augustenburg (1870–1948).

== Bibliography ==
- Mead, Richard (2007). Churchill's Lions: a biographical guide to the key British generals of World War II. Stroud (UK): Spellmount. ISBN 978-1-86227-431-0.
- Smart, Nick (2005). Biographical Dictionary of British Generals of the Second World War. Barnesley: Pen & Sword. ISBN 1844150496.

Government offices
| Preceded by Sir Robert Hudson (Acting) | Governor of Southern Rhodesia; 1947–1953 | Succeeded by Sir Robert Tredgold (Acting) |
Military offices
| Preceded by John Evetts | Assistant Chief of the Imperial General Staff; 1943–1945 | Succeeded by Vyvyan Evelegh |
