= Henry Roper (priest) =

Henry Roper was an Anglican priest in Ireland during the 19th century.

Roper was educated at Trinity College, Dublin. He was Dean of Clonmacnoise from 1811 until his death.
