= Henry Roper (British Army officer) =

British Army general

Major-General Henry Roper CB
- Born: 1923
- Died: 13 July 1982 (aged 58–59)
- Military career
- Branch: British Army
- Service years: 1942–1978
- Rank: Major-General
- Commands: 30th Signal Regiment
- Conflicts: World War II
- Awards: Companion of the Order of the Bath

Major-General Henry Ernest Roper CB (1923 – 13 July 1982) was a British Army officer who became Assistant Chief of the General Staff.

== Military career ==
Roper was commissioned into the Royal Corps of Signals in 1942 and fought in World War II in North West Europe and South East Asia. He was appointed Commanding Officer of 30th Signal Regiment in 1964, Assistant Military Secretary at the Ministry of Defence in 1966 and Director of Project Mallard (a scheme to develop a cellular network for the battlefield) at the Ministry of Technology in 1968. He went on to be Chief Signals Officer for the British Army of the Rhine in 1972 and Assistant Chief of the General Staff (Operational Requirements) in 1975 before retiring in 1978.

Military offices
Preceded by Hugh Cunningham	Assistant Chief of the General Staff; 1975–1978	Succeeded by Ian Baker
