= Vyvyan Evelegh =

British Army general (1898–1958)

Major-General Vyvyan Evelegh CB DSO OBE
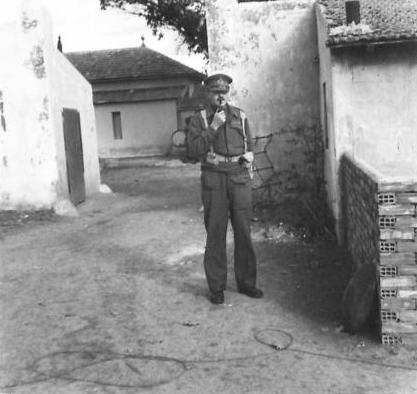
- Evelegh in North Africa in late 1942
- Born: 14 December 1898
- Died: 27 August 1958 (aged 59)
- Military career
- Allegiance: United Kingdom
- Branch: British Army
- Service years: 1917–1950
- Rank: Major-General
- Nickname: "Santa Claus"
- Service number: 15272
- Unit: Duke of Cornwall's Light Infantry
- Commands: 42nd (Lancashire) Division (1948–1950); North-West District (1947–1948); 6th Armoured Division (1943–1944); 78th Infantry Division (1942–1943); 11th Infantry Brigade (1941)
- Conflicts: First World War; Russian Civil War; Second World War
- Awards: Companion of the Order of the Bath; Distinguished Service Order; Officer of the Order of the British Empire; Commander of the Legion of Merit (United States)

Major-General Vyvyan Evelegh, CB, DSO, OBE (14 December 1898 – 27 August 1958) was a senior officer of the British Army during the Second World War, commanding the 78th Infantry Division (otherwise known as the Battleaxe Division) and the 6th Armoured Division in Tunisia and Italy.

== Early life and military career ==
After being educated at Wellington College, Berkshire and later passing out from the Royal Military College, Sandhurst, Evelegh was commissioned into the British Army as a second lieutenant in the Duke of Cornwall's Light Infantry (DCLI) on 1 May 1917, during the First World War. He served on both the Western and Italian Fronts with the 1st Battalion of his regiment, a Regular Army unit that was part of the 95th Brigade of the 5th Division. He was promoted to lieutenant on 1 November 1918, just ten days before the war came to an end on 11 November 1918.

In 1919 Evelegh served with the Allied Relief Mission to North Russia during the Russian Civil War, where he was wounded.

== Between the wars ==
Remaining in the army during the interwar period, Evelegh was promoted to captain on 8 July 1927. He was appointed brigade major of the 130th (Devon and Cornwall) Infantry Brigade of the 43rd (Wessex) Infantry Division, a Territorial Army (TA) formation, on 1 April 1935, then brigade major of the 6th Infantry Brigade of the 2nd Infantry Division on 23 May 1937 and seconded to the staff. He was brevetted to major on 1 July and promoted to the substantive rank of major on 14 October.

Evelegh was brevetted to lieutenant colonel on 1 January 1939, relinquishing his appointment as brigade major on 16 April and was appointed a general staff officer grade 2 (GSO2) on 3 July.

== Second World War ==
On the outbreak of the Second World War in September 1939, Evelegh was promoted to war substantive lieutenant colonel. He saw active service during the Battle of France as part of the British Expeditionary Force (BEF), serving on the staff of II Corps, then commanded by Lieutenant General Sir Alan Brooke, and being made an Officer of the Order of the British Empire, for "distinguished services in the field", on 11 July 1940.

Evelegh then served as an instructor at the Staff College, Camberley, was promoted to brigadier and commanded the 11th Infantry Brigade, part of the 4th Infantry Division, from January to November 1941, before returning to the Staff College to serve as assistant commandant. He was promoted to the permanent rank of colonel on 18 May 1942 (with seniority from 1 January) and on 13 June was promoted to the acting rank of major general and the following day was appointed General Officer Commanding (GOC) of the newly created 78th "Battleaxe" Infantry Division. The 78th was being formed specifically for Operation Torch, the Allied invasion of French North Africa, scheduled for November 1942. Included in the 78th Division's composition was his former command, the 11th Infantry Brigade, now commanded by Brigadier Edward Cass.

Evelegh commanded the 78th Division in North Africa as part of Lieutenant General Charles Allfrey's V Corps, itself part of Lieutenant General Kenneth Anderson's British First Army, seeing action throughout the Tunisian campaign, from November 1942 until the campaign's successful conclusion in mid-May 1943. He received a promotion to temporary major general on 13 June 1943. On 5 August he was made a Companion of the Order of the Bath "in recognition of gallant and distinguished services in Tunisia" and soon after was granted permission to wear the insignia of a Commander of the Legion of Merit, which had been conferred on him by the United States.

Although initially held in reserve, Evelegh's 78th Division took part in the Allied invasion of Sicily (codenamed Operation Husky), playing a notable role in the Battle of Centuripe, and in the early stages of the Italian campaign that followed in the wake of Husky. In December 1943, Evelegh exchanged commands with Major General Charles Keightley, the commander of the 6th Armoured Division, which had also fought in Tunisia. From 16 February to 18 March 1944, during the Battle of Anzio, he temporarily served as deputy commander of the US VI Corps under Major General John P. Lucas who was later replaced by Major General Lucian Truscott. On 23 March 1944 he was awarded the Distinguished Service Order "in recognition of gallant and distinguished services in the field".

Evelegh returned to the command of the 6th Armoured upon its piecemeal arrival in Italy (the 1st Guards Brigade had already arrived in Italy in February) and commanded it during Operation Diadem, the Fourth Battle of Monte Cassino. On 24 July 1944 he relinquished command of the 6th Armoured, due to a perceived poor performance, over to Major General Gerald Templer, to return to the United Kingdom to serve as Assistant Chief of the Imperial General Staff (ACIGS) from August 1944 to May 1945.

== Postwar career ==
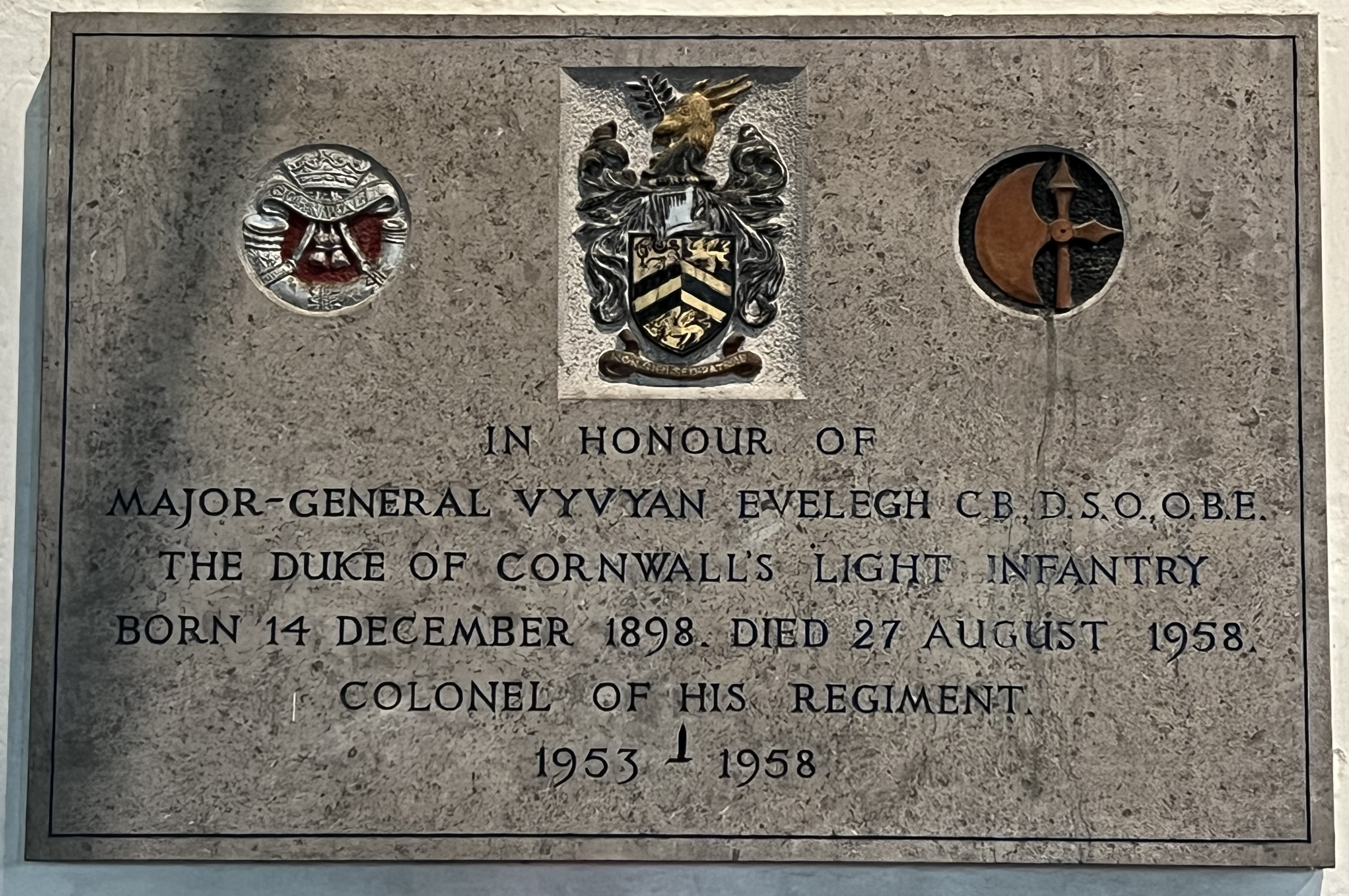
Memorial to Major-General Vyvyan Everlegh in St Petroc's Church, Bodmin

Evelegh was promoted to the substantive rank of major general on 29 December 1946 (with seniority from 19 July 1944). He served as GOC North-West District in 1947–1948 and then GOC 42nd (Lancashire) Division from March 1948 to October 1950 before retiring from the army on 13 November 1950. He was briefly recalled to the Active List to be specially employed between 2 April and 9 October 1951.

Evelegh was colonel of the Duke of Cornwall's Light Infantry from 1953 until his sudden death in 1958.

== Bibliography ==
- Blaxland, Gregory (1977). The Plain Cook and the Great Showman : The First and Eighth Armies in North Africa. Kimber. ISBN 0-7183-0185-4.
- Blaxland, Gregory (1979). Alexander's Generals (the Italian Campaign 1944–1945). London: William Kimber & Co. ISBN 0-7183-0386-5.
- Mead, Richard (2007). Churchill's Lions: a biographical guide to the key British generals of World War II. Stroud (UK): Spellmount. ISBN 978-1-86227-431-0.
- Smart, Nick (2005). Biographical Dictionary of British Generals of the Second World War. Barnesley: Pen & Sword. ISBN 1844150496.

Military offices
New command	GOC 78th Infantry Division; 1942–1943	Succeeded by Charles Keightley
Preceded by Charles Keightley	GOC 6th Armoured Division; 1943–1944	Succeeded by Gerald Templer
Preceded by John Kennedy	Assistant Chief of the General Staff; 1944–1945	Succeeded by Frank Simpson
Preceded by Geoffrey Evans	GOC 42nd (Lancashire) Division; 1948–1950	Succeeded by Valentine Blomfield
Honorary titles
Preceded by Sir Daril Watson	Colonel of the Duke of Cornwall's Light Infantry; 1953–1958	Succeeded by Robert Goldsmith
