= Tony Jeapes =

British Army general

Major-General Tony Jeapes CB OBE MC
- Born: 6 March 1935 (age 91); New Malden, Surrey
- Military career
- Allegiance: United Kingdom
- Branch: British Army
- Service years: 1955–1990
- Rank: Major-General
- Commands: South West District; Land Forces Northern Ireland; 5th Airborne Brigade; 22 Special Air Service Regiment
- Conflicts: Malayan Emergency; Dhofar War
- Awards: Companion of the Order of the Bath; Officer of the Order of the British Empire; Military Cross

Major-General Anthony Showan Jeapes, CB, OBE, MC (born 6 March 1935) is a former British Army officer who commanded the 22 Special Air Service Regiment during the Dhofar Rebellion.

== Early life and education ==
Born in New Malden, Surrey, he was educated at Raynes Park Grammar School and the Royal Military Academy Sandhurst, where he did his first parachute course. In February 1955 he was commissioned into the Dorset Regiment as a second lieutenant.

== SAS ==
In 1958 he joined the 22nd SAS Regiment in Malaya as a troop commander and in 1959 took part in the Jebel Akhdar campaign in Northern Oman, for which he was awarded the Military Cross.

Back in England, he ran selection for the SAS for a year and then went to Fort Bragg, North Carolina in 1961 as an exchange officer with the US 7th Special Forces Group (Airborne).

After a short period in the UK with the now amalgamated Devonshire and Dorsets, he was sent to India as part of a small SAS training team in 1963, and with another to Kenya in 1964. He returned to attend the Army Staff College course at Shrivenham and Camberley, following which he was posted to 39 Infantry Brigade in Northern Ireland as brigade major.

In December 1968, Jeapes returned to 22 SAS as squadron commander, joining D Squadron in Malaya. After a training period in Iran, he took his squadron to Dhofar in 1970 as the first full squadron to support the Sultan's Armed Forces (SAF) in their war against Communist led rebels in Southern Oman. The war was not going well for the SAF. He raised the first of six firqats, irregular units formed largely of ex-rebels, named the Firqat Salahadin, and recaptured the town of Sudh. He then raised more firqats and lead operations on to the Jebel Qara to prove the need to establish a firm position on the Jebel. The concept was accepted and the first permanent position was established by the SAS and SAF after the monsoon that year.

Jeapes returned to the UK to attend the National Defence College, Latimer, and was then promoted lieutenant colonel to return to the Army Staff College as a member of the directing staff, where he led the Counter Revolutionary Warfare team. In 1972 he became the Commanding Officer of 22 SAS. He had an eventful tour of command. He led the counter-terrorism team in the Balcombe Street Siege and he continued to take part in and oversee the Regiment's operations in the Dhofar War, being present at the final operation from Sarfait which saw the defeat of the rebels and brought about the end of the six-year war. Finally, he set up the Regiment's rapid deployment to the campaign in Northern Ireland and directed their methods of operating there. He was appointed an Officer of the Order of the British Empire in the 1977 Silver Jubilee and Birthday Honours.

He was also seriously ill with brucellosis contracted on the Jebel and was given three months' sick leave, during which he wrote the draft of his book SAS Operation Oman.

== Career after the SAS ==
Jeapes's next job was as a member of the British Military Advisory Team to Bangladesh, setting up the syllabus for and teaching at the state's first joint services staff college. At the end of this he was promoted full colonel and deputy commandant of the School of Infantry at Warminster. He was promoted to brigadier immediately after. Following a short time at HQ UKLF, then at HQ CINCFLEET during the Falklands War, he was appointed in 1982 to command the 5th Infantry Brigade, which he converted during his tour to the 5th Airborne Brigade.

In 1985 Jeapes was promoted major general and appointed Commander Land Forces Northern Ireland. His task was to direct the tactical deployment and command the day-to-day operations of all Army, Royal Marines, Ulster Defence Regiment, and of course Special Forces, against the terrorists in cooperation with the uniformed and special branch members of the Royal Ulster Constabulary. It was a job in which he took great satisfaction and achieved a number of successes, for which he was made a Companion of the Order of the Bath. His final appointment, in 1987, was General Officer Commanding South West District, which included most of the Army's Arms Schools and the UK Mobile Force.

== Works ==
Jeapes's account of the Dhofar Rebellion, SAS Operation Oman, was written in 1977 but took three years to receive security clearance. It was eventually published in 1980 by William Kimber. Amended copies were published by HarperCollins in 1996 as SAS Secret War and again by Greenhill Books with the same title in paperback in 2005. It is distributed in the US by Battery Press.

== Personal life ==
He is married with a son and a daughter.

== Notes ==
Military offices
Preceded by Barry Lane	General Officer Commanding South West District; 1987–1990	Succeeded by Anthony Pollard
