= Queen's Own =

Queen's Own and King's Own are designations indicating royal patronage or association with a reigning monarch. They have been historically and primarily designated by The Crown. They may refer to:

== Military groups ==
- King's Own Royal Regiment (Lancaster)
- Queen's Own Buffs, The Royal Kent Regiment
- Queen's Own Cameron Highlanders
- Queen's Own Highlanders (Seaforth and Camerons)
- The Queen's Own Rifles of Canada
- Queen's Own Royal West Kent Regiment
- Queen's Own Yeomanry
- Queen's Royal Hussars, see also Queen's Own Hussars
- Each division of the Royal Gurkha Rifles

== Other ==
- The Queen's Own Hussars Museum
