= General Beach =

General Beach may refer to:

- Dwight E. Beach (1908–2000), U.S. Army general
- Hugh Beach (1923–2019), British Army general
- Lansing Hoskins Beach (1860–1945), U.S. Army major general
- William Dorrance Beach (1856–1932), U.S. Army brigadier general
- William Henry Beach (1871–1952), British Army major general
