= Boswall =

Boswall is a surname. Notable people with the name include:

- Alexander Henry Boswall MacGowan (1850–1927), British businessman and political figure
- John Boswall ( 1920–2011), British actor
- Jeffery Boswall (1931–2012), British naturalist, broadcaster and educator
- Karen Boswall, British independent film maker
- Thomas Boswall Beach (1866–1941), British Army officer during the South African War and First World War

== See also ==
- Houstoun-Boswall baronets, is a title in the Baronetage of the United Kingdom
