= Anthony Pollard =

Anthony or Tony Pollard may refer to:

- Anthony Pollard (British Army officer) (born 1937), British Army major general
- A. J. Pollard (Anthony James Pollard, born 1941), British medieval historian
- Tony Pollard (archaeologist) (born 1965), British archaeologist specialising in conflict archaeology
- Tony Pollard (born 1997), American football running back for the Dallas Cowboys
