= Robert Lyon (British Army officer) =

British Army officer (1923–2019)

Major-General Robert Lyon CB OBE
- Born: 24 October 1923
- Died: 13 November 2019 (aged 96)
- Military career
- Allegiance: United Kingdom
- Branch: British Army
- Rank: Major-General
- Commands: 4th Light Regiment Royal Artillery; Royal Armoured Corps Centre; South West District
- Conflicts: Second World War; Indonesia–Malaysia confrontation
- Awards: Companion of the Order of the Bath; Officer of the Order of the British Empire

Major-General Robert Lyon CB OBE (24 October 1923 – 13 November 2019) was a British Army officer.

== Military career ==
Educated at Ayr Academy, Lyon was commissioned into the Argyll and Sutherland Highlanders in August 1943 and saw action in Europe during the Second World War. After transferring to the Royal Artillery in 1947, he became commanding officer of 4th Light Regiment Royal Artillery in 1965 and in that role was deployed to Borneo during the Indonesia–Malaysia confrontation. He went on to be Commander Royal Artillery, 1st Armoured Division in 1967, Director of Operational Requirements at the Ministry of Defence in 1971 and Director Royal Artillery in 1973. His last appointment was as General Officer Commanding South West District in 1975 before retiring in 1978.

He was appointed a Companion of the Order of the Bath in the 1976 New Year Honours.

In 1951 he married Constance Margaret Gordon; they had one son and one daughter. Following the death of his first wife, he married Rosemary Jane Allchin in 1992.

He died on 13 November 2019 at the age of 96.

Military offices
Preceded by George Cooper	General Officer Commanding South West District; 1975–1978	Succeeded by Sir John Acland
