= John Acland (British Army officer) =

British Army general (1928-2006)

Major-General Sir John Acland KCB CBE DL
- Born: 26 November 1928
- Died: 17 November 2006 (aged 77)
- Relatives: Peter Acland (father); Antony Acland (brother); Alfred Dyke Acland (grandfather); Henry Acland (great grandfather)
- Military career
- Allegiance: United Kingdom
- Branch: British Army
- Service years: 1948–1981
- Rank: Major-General
- Service number: 397794
- Unit: Scots Guards
- Commands: 2nd Battalion, Scots Guards; Land Forces, Cyprus; South West District; Commonwealth Monitoring Force Rhodesia
- Awards: Knight Commander of the Order of the Bath; Commander of the Order of the British Empire

Major-General Sir John Hugh Bevil Acland, KCB, CBE, DL (26 November 1928 – 17 November 2006) was a senior British Army officer.

== Early life ==
Acland was born on 26 November 1928, the elder son of Peter Acland and Bridget Susan Acland (née Barnett). His younger brother Antony went on to become head of Her Majesty's Diplomatic Service and British Ambassador in Washington. He was educated at Eton College.

== Military career ==
Having attended the Royal Military Academy Sandhurst, Acland was commissioned into the Scots Guards as a second lieutenant on 22 December 1948, with seniority from that date. He was given the service number 397794. He was promoted to lieutenant on 22 December 1950. He fought in the Malayan Emergency. He was promoted to captain on 22 December 1954. With his regiment, he was involved in the Cyprus Emergency of 1957. Subsequently, he was nominated equerry to Prince Henry, Duke of Gloucester, a post he held for the next two years.

Acland attended Staff College, Camberley and was promoted to major on 22 December 1961. He then took part in the combats of the Mau Mau Uprising in Kenya. Following the Zanzibar Revolution in 1964, he was appointed brigade major of 4th Guards Brigade in the British Army of the Rhine and was promoted to lieutenant-colonel in 1967. He became commanding officer of the 2nd Battalion, Scots Guards in 1968 and led it in the Northern Ireland riots of August 1969.

After the announcement of the battalion's possible disbandment, he spoke out against it in a letter to The Times, which prompted his senior general to suspend further promotion for a time. Acland was sent to desk work in the Ministry of Defence, responsible for the annual review of the number of major-generals' posts in the British Army. In 1976, he was finally promoted to brigadier and became commander of the land forces in Cyprus. Two years later, he obtained command of the South West District as a major-general. With the end of the Rhodesian Bush War and the establishment of the Republic of Zimbabwe Rhodesia in 1979, Acland was selected commander of the Commonwealth Monitoring Force. His aide-de-camp during this period was Iain Duncan Smith, who would later go on to lead the Conservative Party and hold several cabinet roles. Acland retired from the Army in 1981.

== Later life ==
After retiring from the military, Acland spent his time as director of Allied Vintners, then as chairman of the South West Working Party on Alcohol. Acland was president of The Royal British Legion Devon and sat on the Dartmoor National Park Authority. Having been previously Deputy Lieutenant from 1985, he was appointed Vice Lord-Lieutenant of Devon in 1995.

== Personal life ==
On 12 November 1953, he married the fashion model Myrtle Christian Euing Crawford, daughter of Brigadier Alistair Wardrop Euing Crawford. They had a son and daughter.

== Honours and decorations ==
In the 1978 Birthday Honours, he was appointed Commander of the Order of the British Empire. In the 1980 Birthday Honours, he was appointed Knight Commander of Order of the Bath.

He was made honorary colonel of the Royal Devon Yeomanry in 1983 and was granted the same rank also of the Exeter University Officer's Training Corps in 1986 and of the Royal Wessex Yeomanry in 1989.

Military offices
Preceded by Robert Lyon	GOC South West District; 1978–1981	Succeeded by Michael Gray
Honorary titles
Preceded by The Lord Clifford of Chudleigh	Honorary Colonel of the Royal Devon Yeomanry; 1983–1992	Succeeded by Sir John Waters
Preceded by Hon. James Ian Morrison	Honorary Colonel of the Royal Wessex Yeomanry; 1989–1992	Succeeded by Sir John Waters
