= Peter Leng =

British Army general

General Sir Peter Leng KCB MBE MC
- Born: 9 May 1925
- Died: 11 February 2009 (aged 83)
- Military career
- Allegiance: United Kingdom
- Branch: British Army
- Service years: 1944–1981
- Rank: General
- Service number: 307865
- Units: Scots Guards; Royal Anglian Regiment
- Commands: 3rd Battalion, Royal Anglian Regiment; 24th Airmobile Brigade; 1st (British) Corps
- Conflicts: World War II; Operation Banner
- Awards: Knight Commander of the Order of the Bath; Member of the Order of the British Empire; Military Cross

General Sir Peter John Hall Leng, KCB MBE MC (9 May 1925 – 11 February 2009) was a British Army General and Master-General of the Ordnance (1981–1983) & Counter Terrorism Expert in Northern Ireland.

== Military service ==
Leng was born in 1925 in Sunderland and went to Bradfield College, Berkshire. He was commissioned into the Scots Guards in 1944. He was awarded a Military Cross in April 1945 for his actions in Visselhövede in Germany. Leng, as platoon officer, led forward a section and captured over 60 German prisoners. He was then wounded in May during the advance on Hamburg.

After the war he was appointed Military Assistant to the Chief of Defence Staff, Lord Mountbatten of Burma. He returned to the 2nd Battalion Scots Guards as its second in command in 1965, and was transferred to the Royal Anglian Regiment in 1964 as commanding officer of the 3rd battalion of the Regiment in Berlin within the British Army of the Rhine. His battalion later moved to Aden where the security situation was deteriorating. After promotion to the rank of brigadier, he commanded the 24th Airmobile Brigade. He moved to the Ministry of Defence in 1971 as deputy military secretary, and was appointed to command of the British Army forces in Northern Ireland in 1973. When he left, bombings and other violence had dropped to a fifth of the level of when he arrived.

In 1975 he became Director of Military Operations at the Ministry of Defence and in 1978 he was asked to command the 1st (British) Corps in Germany. He won praise from NATO command and successfully executed Exercise Spearpoint. He became Master-General of the Ordnance in 1981. He retired from the Army in 1983 and became chairman of the Racecourse Association, during which time he was instrumental in securing the live broadcasting of races in betting shops.

== Personal life ==
He first married Virginia Rosemary Pearson, dissolved in 1981. He then remarried to Flavia Tower, daughter of Lieutenant General Sir Frederick Browning and novelist Daphne de Maurier. His second wife survives him along with several children from his first marriage.

Military offices
Preceded by Sir Richard Worsley	GOC 1st (British) Corps; 1978–1980	Succeeded by Sir Nigel Bagnall
Preceded by Sir Hugh Beach	Master-General of the Ordnance; 1981–1983	Succeeded by Sir Richard Vincent
