= George Cooper (British Army officer) =

British Army officer (1925–2020)

General Sir George Cooper GCB MC DL
- Born: George Leslie Conroy Cooper; 10 August 1925; London, England
- Died: 6 January 2020 (aged 94)
- Military career
- Allegiance: United Kingdom
- Branch: British Army
- Service years: 1945–1984
- Rank: General
- Service number: 357063
- Unit: Royal Engineers
- Commands: South East District (1979–1981); South West District (1974–1975); 19th Airportable Brigade (1969–1971)
- Conflicts: Korean War
- Awards: Knight Grand Cross of the Order of the Bath; Military Cross

General Sir George Leslie Conroy Cooper, GCB, MC, DL (10 August 1925 – 6 January 2020) was a senior British Army officer who served as Adjutant-General to the Forces from 1981 to 1984.

== Military career ==
Educated at Downside School and Trinity College, Cambridge, George Cooper was commissioned into the Royal Engineers in 1945. He joined the Bengal Sappers & Miners. He served in the Korean War and was awarded the Military Cross for his service in that campaign.

Cooper became Commander Royal Engineers in the 4th Infantry Division in 1966. He went on to become Commander, 19th Airportable Brigade in 1969, General Officer Commanding South West District in 1974 and Director of Army Staff Duties in 1976. After that he became General Officer Commanding South East District in 1979. He became Adjutant General in 1981, before retiring in 1984.

Cooper was appointed ADC General to the Queen in 1982, retaining that status until 1984. He was also appointed a Knight Commander of the Order of the Bath in 1979, and a Knight Grand Cross of the Order of the Bath in 1984.

== Later life and death ==
In retirement, Cooper became a member of the Board of Management of GEC UK. He also became a Deputy Lieutenant of Essex, and released the book Fight, Dig and Live about the part the Royal Engineers played in the Korean War.

He died in January 2020 at the age of 94.

== Family ==
In 1957 Cooper married Cynthia Mary Hume and they had one son and one daughter.

Military offices
Preceded by Hugh Cunningham	GOC South West District; 1974–1975	Succeeded by Robert Lyon
Preceded by Sir Anthony Farrar-Hockley	GOC South East District; 1979–1981	Succeeded by Sir Paul Travers
Preceded by Sir Robert Ford	Adjutant-General to the Forces; 1981–1984	Succeeded by Sir Roland Guy
Honorary titles
Preceded by Sir Hugh Beach	Chief Royal Engineer; 1987–1993	Succeeded by Sir John Stibbon
