= The Queen's Own Hussars Museum =

Coordinates: 52.2801°N 1.5904°W

The Queen's Own Hussars Museum was a military museum in Warwick in central England. It was housed in a range of 14th century half-timbered buildings known as Lord Leycester Hospital. The Queen's Own Hussars was the senior light cavalry regiment of the British Army. The museum also covered the history of the 7th Queen's Own Hussars and the 3rd The King's Own Hussars. The museum was closed in 2016 and a nearby building known as "Trinity Mews" is being refurbished as the museum of the Queen's Royal Hussars and its antecedent regiments. The new museum is due to open in 2018.
