= Richard Worsley =

British Army general (1923–2013)

General Sir Richard Worsley GCB OBE
- Born: 29 May 1923; Ballywalter, County Down, Northern Ireland
- Died: 23 February 2013 (aged 89)
- Spouse(s): Sarah Anne Mitchell; Caroline Carnegie, Duchess of Fife
- Relatives: Henry Worsley (son)
- Military career
- Allegiance: United Kingdom
- Branch: British Army
- Service years: 1942–1982
- Rank: General
- Unit: Rifle Brigade (Prince Consort's Own)
- Commands: 1st (British) Corps; 3rd Division; 7th Armoured Brigade; 1st The Royal Dragoons
- Conflicts: Second World War; Malayan Emergency
- Awards: Knight Grand Cross of the Order of the Bath; Officer of the Order of the British Empire

General Sir Richard Edward Worsley, GCB, OBE (29 May 1923 – 23 February 2013) was a senior British Army officer who fought in the Second World War and later commanded 1st (British) Corps.

== Early life ==
Worsley was born on 29 May 1923 at Ballywalter, County Down, Northern Ireland, the son of Herbert Henry Knight Worsley, JP (1885–1947) of Lough House, Grey Abbey, County Down, by Rose Austen (died 30 April 1958), only daughter of John Alfred Hives of Upper Plain, Masterton, New Zealand, farmer, and widow of Major Meyrick Myler Magrath, DSO, Royal Field Artillery, of Dorking House, Cosham, Hampshire. He was educated at Radley College.

His uncles were the first-class cricket batsmen A. E. Worsley and C. E. A. Worsley, who both played for Northamptonshire.

== Military career ==
During the Second World War Worsley was commissioned as a second lieutenant into the British Army's Rifle Brigade (Prince Consort's Own) in 1942. He served in the Middle East and Italy.

After the war he then served in the Malayan Emergency in 1948. He became an instructor at the Royal Military Academy Sandhurst later in 1948 and then became Commanding Officer (CO) of the 1st The Royal Dragoons in 1962.

He took command of the 7th Armoured Brigade in 1965 and Chief of Staff Far East Land Forces in 1969. He became General Officer Commanding (GOC) 3rd Division in 1972 and GOC 1st (British) Corps in 1976. His final appointment was as Quartermaster-General to the Forces in 1979; he retired in 1982. He was appointed an Officer of the Order of the British Empire in the 1964 New Year Honours and a Knight Commander of the Order of the Bath in the 1976 Birthday Honours. He was advanced to Knight Grand Cross of the Order of the Bath in the 1982 New Year Honours.

He lived at Goring Heath in South Oxfordshire and died on 23 February 2013.

== Personal life ==
He married on 6 May 1959 at Holy Trinity Church, Brompton, London, to Sarah Anne "Sally", eldest daughter of Brigadier J. A. H. Mitchell of the British Embassy, Paris, and they went on to have a son, Henry, and a daughter, Charlotte. On 7 Nov 1980, he married Caroline Carnegie, Duchess of Fife.

Military offices
| Preceded by Glyn Gilbert | General Officer Commanding the 3rd Division; 1972–1974 | Succeeded by Robin Carnegie |
| Preceded by Sir Jack Harman | GOC 1st (British) Corps; 1976–1978 | Succeeded by Sir Peter Leng |
| Preceded by Sir Patrick Howard-Dobson | Quartermaster-General to the Forces; 1979–1982 | Succeeded by Sir Paul Travers |
