= John Douglas-Withers =

British Army general

Major-General John Douglas-Withers CBE MC
- Born: 11 December 1919
- Died: 3 November 1997 (aged 77)
- Military career
- Allegiance: United Kingdom
- Branch: British Army
- Rank: Major-General
- Commands: 6th Infantry Brigade; South West District
- Awards: Commander of the Order of the British Empire; Military Cross

Major-General John Keppel Ingold Douglas-Withers, CBE, MC (11 December 1919 – 3 November 1997) was a British Army officer.

== Military career ==
Douglas-Withers was commissioned into the Royal Artillery on 5 October 1940 and served as a forward observer during the Italian Campaign of the Second World War. After the war, he became Commander of 6th Infantry Brigade in December 1965, Chief of Staff, 1st (British) Corps in February 1968 and General Officer Commanding South West District in February 1970 before retiring in December 1971.

He was appointed a Commander of the Order of the British Empire in the 1969 Birthday Honours.

Military offices
Preceded by Thomas Acton	GOC South West District; 1970–1971	Succeeded by Hugh Cunningham
