= Ian Gill (British Army officer) =

British Army general (1919–2006)

Major-General Ian Gill CB OBE MC*
- Born: 9 November 1919; Rochester, Kent, England
- Died: 23 November 2006 (aged 87)
- Military career
- Allegiance: United Kingdom
- Branch: British Army
- Service years: 1938–1972
- Rank: Major-General
- Service number: 79107
- Unit: 4th/7th Dragoon Guards
- Commands: 7th Armoured Brigade; 4th/7th Royal Dragoon Guards
- Conflicts: World War II; Palestine Emergency
- Awards: Companion of the Order of the Bath; Officer of the Order of the British Empire; Military Cross & Bar; Mentioned in despatches (2)

Major-General Ian Gordon Gill, CB, OBE, MC & Bar (9 November 1919 – 23 November 2006) was a British Army officer who fought with distinction during the Second World War, later serving as Assistant Chief of the General Staff from 1970 to 1972.

== Military career ==
Educated at Repton School, Gill was commissioned into the 4th/7th Royal Dragoon Guards in 1938 and fought in World War II at the Dunkirk evacuation and in the Normandy landings and then in North West Europe.

After the war he served in Palestine during the Palestine Emergency and in 1957 became Commanding Officer of 4th/7th Royal Dragoon Guards. He was made commander of Victory College at the Royal Military Academy Sandhurst in 1961 and commander of the 7th Armoured Brigade in 1964. He went on to be Deputy Military Secretary in 1966, Head of the British Defence Liaison Staff in Canberra in 1968 and Assistant Chief of the General Staff (Operational Requirements) in 1970 before retiring in 1972.

In retirement, he lived at Thorney in Cambridgeshire and became Director of the Thorney Abbey Restoration Fund.

== Family ==
In 1963 he married Elizabeth Vivian (Sally) Rohr, a consultant neurologist; they had no children.

Military offices
Preceded by William Jackson	Assistant Chief of the General Staff; 1970–1972	Succeeded by Frank Caldwell
Honorary titles
Preceded by James d'Avigdor-Goldsmid	Colonel of the 4th/7th Royal Dragoon Guards; 1973–1979	Succeeded by Sir Rollo Pain
