= Henry Worsley (explorer) =

British explorer and British Army officer

Lieutenant Colonel Henry Worsley MBE
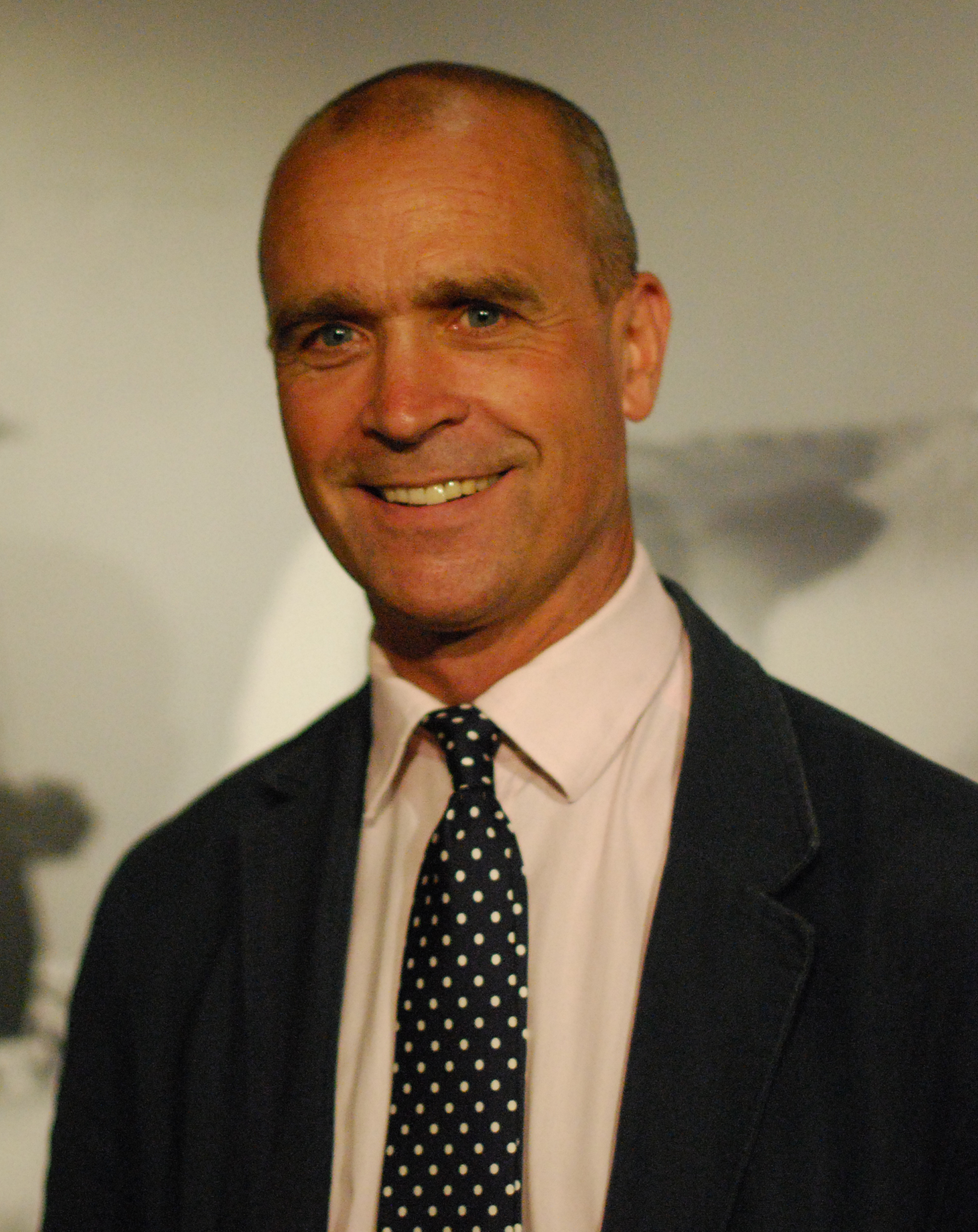
- Worsley in 2010
- Born: Alastair Edward Henry Worsley; 4 October 1960; Belsize Park, London, England
- Died: 24 January 2016 (aged 55); Punta Arenas, Chile
- Spouse: Joanna Stainton (m. 1993)
- Children: 2
- Parent(s): General Sir Richard Worsley; Sarah Anne Mitchell
- Military career
- Allegiance: United Kingdom
- Branch: British Army
- Service years: 1980–2015
- Rank: Lieutenant Colonel
- Nickname: "Curly Wurly"
- Service number: 509600
- Commands: 2nd Royal Green Jackets
- Conflicts: War in Afghanistan
- Awards: Member of the Order of the British Empire; Queen's Commendation for Valuable Service

Lieutenant Colonel Alastair Edward Henry Worsley, MBE (4 October 1960 – 24 January 2016) was a British explorer and British Army officer. He was part of a 2009 expedition that retraced Ernest Shackleton's footsteps in the Antarctic.

Worsley died in 2016 while attempting to complete the first solo and unaided crossing of the Antarctic. He trekked more than 900 miles (1450 km) but was forced by exhaustion and ill health to call for help 126 miles (200 km) from his journey's intended end. He was rescued and flown to a hospital in Punta Arenas, Chile, but had developed peritonitis, and died the following day.

== Early life and education ==
Henry Worsley was born on 4 October 1960 at the Garrett Anderson Maternity Home in Belsize Grove, London. He was the only son of General Sir Richard Worsley and his first wife, Sarah Anne "Sally", eldest daughter of Brigadier J. A. H. Mitchell, of the British Embassy, Paris. It has been stated that he was related to Frank Worsley, the captain of explorer Ernest Shackleton's ship, the Endurance. From childhood he had a strong interest in the Antarctic explorers of the early twentieth century.

Worsley was educated at Selwyn House, a private prep school, and at Stowe School, then an all-boys independent senior school in Stowe, Buckinghamshire. A keen sportsman, he captained the school cricket and rugby teams while at Stowe. He did not attend university, and entered the Royal Military Academy Sandhurst after completing school to train as an army officer.

== Military career ==
Worsley was a soldier in the British Army for 36 years. He served with the Royal Green Jackets and later The Rifles. In 1988, he passed the Special Air Service (SAS) selection course and served in 22 SAS Regiment. He was commanding officer of the 2nd Battalion Royal Green Jackets from 2000 to 2002, and commanded the 2001 British military operation in Afghanistan, known as "Operation Veritas". Later in 2005–2006, Worsley led the torch party team for the UK that transitioned operational responsibility of the volatile Helmand Province from the US to the UK leading to the establishment of Camp Bastion in a remote part of the province. He also served in Northern Ireland, Bosnia and Kosovo. His final tour before retirement was as a Special Operations Officer based in the Pentagon, liaising on behalf of the British Army with United States special operations forces.

On 12 April 1980, Worsley was commissioned in the Royal Green Jackets, as a second lieutenant. He was promoted to lieutenant on 12 April 1982, to captain on 12 October 1986, to major on 30 September 1992 (having attended Staff College), and to lieutenant colonel on 30 June 2000. He retired from the army on 4 October 2015.

On 12 October 1993, Worsley was appointed a Member of the Order of the British Empire (MBE) "in recognition of distinguished service in Northern Ireland". On 19 April 2002, he was awarded the Queen's Commendation for Valuable Service "in recognition of gallant and distinguished services in the former Yugoslavia during the period 1 April 2001 to 30 September 2001".

== Antarctic expeditions ==
In 2008, he led an expedition through the Transantarctic Mountains to the South Pole to commemorate the centenary of Shackleton's Nimrod Expedition which had turned around 97 miles short of the pole in order to return safely overland. Worsley's team of three made it to the Pole, and flew home. He returned to the Antarctic in 2011, leading a team of six in retracing Roald Amundsen's successful 870-mile (1,400 km) journey in 1912 to the South Pole, marking its centenary.

=== Final expedition ===
Worsley's intention was to follow in the spirit of his hero, Shackleton, and before starting the trip raised over £100,000 for the Endeavour Fund, set up to assist injured servicemen and women. The patron of the expedition was Prince William, Duke of Cambridge. In contrast to the 1997 solo crossing by Børge Ousland, Worsley travelled without a kite to help pull his 150-kilogram (330 lb) sledge.

Worsley arrived at his starting point, Berkner Island, on 13 November 2015 with the aim of completing his journey in 80 days. He covered 913 miles (1,469 km) in 69 days, and had only 30 miles (48 km) to go. However, he had to spend days 70 and 71 in his tent suffering from exhaustion and severe dehydration. Eventually he radioed for help and was airlifted to Punta Arenas, Chile. He was diagnosed with bacterial peritonitis. On 24 January 2016, he died of organ failure following surgery at the Clínica Magallanes in Punta Arenas. He was 55 years old. In 2017, Worsley was posthumously awarded the Polar Medal for his exploration of the Antarctic.

== Personal life ==
Worsley lived in Fulham, London. On 20 February 1993, he married Joanna, the daughter of Andrew Stainton, at St Mary's Church, Chilham, Canterbury, Kent. Together, they had two children; a son, Max, and daughter, Alicia.

His funeral was attended by Prince William, who was also a benefactor of his final expedition. They last spoke on Christmas Day 2015 on a Satellite Telephone.

In December 2017, his widow and two children visited South Georgia Island to inter his ashes in a place that he loved and near his lifelong idol, Ernest Shackleton.

== Works ==
- Worsley, Henry (2011). In Shackleton's Footsteps: A Return to the Heart of the Antarctic. London: Virgin Books. ISBN 978-1905264933.
