= Frank Caldwell (British Army officer) =

British Army general (1921–2014)

Major-General Frank Caldwell OBE MC*
- Born: 26 February 1921
- Died: 22 November 2014 (aged 93)
- Military career
- Allegiance: United Kingdom
- Branch: British Army
- Service years: 1940–1974
- Rank: Major-General
- Service number: 125197
- Conflicts: Second World War; Malayan Emergency
- Awards: Officer of the Order of the British Empire; Military Cross & Bar

Major-General Frank Griffiths Caldwell, OBE, MC and bar (26 February 1921 – 22 November 2014) was a British Army officer who became Assistant Chief of the General Staff.

== Military career ==
Educated at Elizabeth College and the Royal Military College, Sandhurst, Caldwell was commissioned into the Royal Engineers in 1940 during the Second World War. He served in the Middle East, where he was awarded the Military Cross in May 1941 and a bar to it in December 1941, and in North West Europe. He also served in Malaya during the Malayan Emergency in the rank of major. He was appointed Director of Defence Operational Plans at the Ministry of Defence in 1970 and Assistant Chief of the General Staff (Operational Requirements) in 1972 before retiring in 1974. He died on 22 November 2014 in Guernsey.

== Family ==
He married Betty Palmer Buesden; they have a daughter and a son.

Military offices
Preceded by Ian Gill	Assistant Chief of the General Staff; 1972–1974	Succeeded by Hugh Cunningham
