= Thomas Acton (British Army officer) =

British Army general

Major-General Thomas Acton CBE
- Born: 12 June 1917
- Died: 22 January 1977 (aged 59)
- Military career
- Allegiance: United Kingdom
- Branch: British Army
- Service years: 1938–1971
- Rank: Major-General
- Service number: 71213
- Unit: Rifle Brigade (The Prince Consort's Own)
- Commands: 126th Infantry Brigade; South West District
- Conflicts: World War II; The Troubles
- Awards: Commander of the Order of the British Empire

Major-General Thomas Heward Acton, CBE (12 June 1917 – 22 January 1977) was a British Army officer.

== Military career ==
Acton was commissioned into the Rifle Brigade (The Prince Consort's Own) in the late 1930s and was mentioned in dispatches for his service during the Second World War. After the war, he became commander of 126th Infantry Brigade in October 1963, General Officer Commanding South West District in February 1967 and then Commander of Land Forces in Northern Ireland in February 1970 during the Troubles. He went on to be Chief of Staff at HQ Northern Ireland in July 1970 before retiring in May 1971.

He was appointed a Commander of the Order of the British Empire in the 1963 Birthday Honours.

Military offices
Preceded by Michael Halford (as GOC 43rd (Wessex) Infantry Division)	GOC South West District; 1967–1970	Succeeded by John Douglas-Withers
