= Robert Ford (British Army officer) =

British general (1923–2015)

General Sir Robert Ford GCB CBE
- Born: 29 December 1923; Yealmpton, Devon, England
- Died: 24 November 2015 (aged 91); Dorset, England
- Military career
- Allegiance: United Kingdom
- Branch: British Army
- Service years: 1943–1981
- Rank: General
- Service number: 284433
- Unit: 4th/7th Royal Dragoon Guards
- Commands: 4th/7th Royal Dragoon Guards; 7 Armoured Brigade; Royal Military Academy Sandhurst
- Conflicts: World War II; Palestine Emergency; The Troubles
- Awards: Knight Grand Cross of the Order of the Bath; Commander of the Order of the British Empire; Mentioned in despatches (2)

General Sir Robert Cyril Ford (29 December 1923 – 24 November 2015) was a British Army general who was Adjutant-General to the Forces. The Bloody Sunday shootings occurred during his tenure as Commander Land Forces, Northern Ireland.

== Early career ==
Born in Devon to John and Gladys Ford, Robert Ford was educated at Musgrave's College and received an emergency commission in the Royal Armoured Corps in 1943. He served in North West Europe during World War II and was mentioned in despatches. He was appointed to a permanent commission with the substantive rank of lieutenant on 29 June 1946. He was appointed a lieutenant in the 4th/7th Royal Dragoon Guards on 1 February 1947 and was deployed to Palestine during the Palestine Emergency the same year, where as a temporary captain he was again mentioned in despatches in 1948. He was promoted to captain on 29 December 1950 and to major on 29 December 1957.

Ford was brevetted to lieutenant-colonel on 1 July 1962 and promoted to substantive lieutenant-colonel on 4 February 1966. He became commanding officer of 4th/7th Royal Dragoon Guards the same year. Skipping one rank, he was promoted to brigadier on 31 December 1967 and appointed Commander of 7th Armoured Brigade in 1968.

== Northern Ireland and Bloody Sunday ==
On 29 July 1971 Brigadier Ford was appointed Commander Land Forces, Northern Ireland, with the acting rank of major-general; he was promoted to the substantive rank on 29 August. He was criticised in the Saville Report into the Bloody Sunday massacre of 30 January 1972 in Derry for deploying soldiers to arrest peaceful protestors: "In our view his decision to use 1 Para as the arrest force is open to criticism but he did not know his decision would result in soldiers firing unjustifiably".

In the secret memo to his superior, dated 7 January 1972, Ford had said he was "coming to the conclusion that the minimum force necessary to achieve a restoration of law and order is to shoot selected ringleaders amongst the DYH (Derry Young Hooligans), after clear warnings have been issued". In the event, seven of the innocent victims were teenagers. At the Bloody Sunday inquiry he claimed not to remember having written the memo. Ford relinquished his command on 9 April 1973.

== Later career ==
In 1973, Ford became Commandant of the Royal Military Academy Sandhurst, and in 1976 he was appointed Military Secretary. He was Adjutant General from 1978 to 1981 when he retired from the British Army.

He was ADC General to the Queen from 1980 to 1981.

He was awarded the CB in 1973, the KCB in 1977 and the GCB in 1981. He was also awarded the MBE in 1958 and the CBE in 1971.

== Retirement ==
In retirement he was Chairman of the Army Benevolent Fund from 1981 to 1987. He was also Governor of the Royal Hospital Chelsea from 1981 to 1987. He served as Vice-Chairman of the Commonwealth War Graves Commission from 1989 to 1993. He died on 24 November 2015.

== Family ==
In 1949, Ford married Jean Claudia Pendlebury (died 2002) and they had a son. He married Caroline Margaret Peerless (née Leather) in 2003.

Military offices
Preceded by Jack Harman	Commandant of the Royal Military Academy Sandhurst; 1973–1976	Succeeded by Philip Ward
Preceded by Sir Patrick Howard-Dobson	Military Secretary; 1976–1978	Succeeded by Sir Robin Carnegie
Preceded by Sir Jack Harman	Adjutant General; 1978–1981	Succeeded by Sir George Cooper
Honorary titles
Preceded by Sir Antony Read	Governor, Royal Hospital Chelsea; 1981–1987	Succeeded by Sir Roland Guy
Preceded by Sir Rollo Pain	Colonel of the 4th/7th Royal Dragoon Guards; 1983–1989	Succeeded by Robert Baddeley
