= Barry Lane (British Army officer) =

British Army officer (1932–2022)

Major-General Barry Lane CB OBE
- Born: 10 August 1932
- Died: 30 January 2022 (aged 89)
- Military career
- Allegiance: United Kingdom
- Branch: British Army
- Service years: 1954–1987
- Rank: Major-General
- Service number: 433169
- Units: Somerset Light Infantry; Somerset and Cornwall Light Infantry; The Light Infantry
- Commands: 1st Battalion, The Light Infantry; 11th Armoured Brigade; South West District
- Awards: Companion of the Order of the Bath; Officer of the Order of the British Empire

Major-General Barry Michael Lane CB OBE (10 August 1932 – 30 January 2022) was a British Army officer.

== Military career ==
Educated at Dover College, Lane was commissioned into the Somerset Light Infantry in 1954. He became commanding officer of the 1st Battalion, The Light Infantry in 1972. He went on to be commander 11th Armoured Brigade in 1977, Deputy Director, Army Staff Duties at the Ministry of Defence in 1980 and Director, Army Quartering at the Ministry of Defence in 1981. After that he became Vice Quartermaster-General in 1982 and General Officer Commanding South West District in 1984 before retiring in 1987.

He was appointed a Companion of the Order of the Bath in the 1984 New Year Honours.

After retirement from the army he became Chief Executive of Cardiff Bay Development Corporation.

In 1956 he married Eveline Jean Koelle; they had one son and one daughter. After the death of his first wife, he married Shirley Ann Hawtin.

He died from Parkinson's disease on 30 January 2022, at the age of 89.

Military offices
Preceded by Michael Gray	GOC South West District; 1984−1987	Succeeded by Tony Jeapes
