= Hugh Beach =

British Army general (1923–2019)

General Sir Hugh Beach GBE KCB MC
- Born: 20 May 1923; South Kensington, London, England
- Died: 4 September 2019 (aged 96)
- Relatives: William Henry Beach (father); Thomas Boswall Beach (uncle)
- Military career
- Allegiance: United Kingdom
- Branch: British Army
- Service years: 1941–1981
- Rank: General
- Service number: 251023
- Unit: Royal Engineers
- Commands: Staff College, Camberley; 12th Infantry Brigade
- Conflicts: Second World War
- Awards: Knight Grand Cross of the Order of the British Empire; Knight Commander of the Order of the Bath; Military Cross

General Sir William Gerald Hugh Beach, GBE, KCB, MC (20 May 1923 – 4 September 2019) was a British Army officer who, in retirement, researched and advised on defence policy, arms control and disarmament, with an interest in promoting concerns about ethical issues of peace and war.

== Early life ==
Beach was educated at Winchester College, Peterhouse, Cambridge (MA 1961) and the University of Edinburgh (MSc 1971).

== Military career ==
Beach joined the Corps of Royal Engineers in August 1941. He saw active service in France and Belgium in 1944 and in Java in 1946. In Normandy he was ordered to clear a road of mines, but the first vehicle to use the road struck an undetected mine and was destroyed. He cleared the road again and rode on the next vehicle to use the road. In the North of France he was attached to the 11th Hussars. He was injured while reconnoitring a bridge at Cuinchy, on La Bassée Canal, but insisted on filing a full report before being taken to hospital at Arras, enabling the British to capture the bridge.

During the 1960s Beach commanded an engineer regiment and an infantry brigade, both at Osnabrück in Germany. In 1964 he reorganised the volunteer reserves. He was director of army staff duties at the Ministry of Defence from 1971 to 1973, commandant of the Staff College, Camberley from 1974 to 1975, and Deputy Commander-in-Chief UK Land Forces from 1976 to 1977 before becoming Master-General of the Ordnance (Army Board member for Procurement) from 1977 to 1981.

Beach also served as Colonel of the Royal Pioneer Corps from 1976 to 1981.

== Later life ==
Retiring from the army in 1981, Beach served as warden of St. George's House, Windsor Castle from 1981 to 1986, vice-Lord Lieutenant of Greater London from 1981 to 1987, Chief Royal Engineer from 1982 to 1987 and member of the Security Commission from 1982 to 1991. He chaired Ministry of Defence Study Groups on Censorship in War in 1983 and Education in the Army in 1984. He was director of the Council for Arms Control from 1986 to 1989. He was a member of the Board of Governors of Monkton Combe School from 1984 to 1993. In the 1990s he was chairman of the governors of Gordon's and Bedales schools, and also chaired the boards of the Church Army and the Society for Promoting Christian Knowledge.

Beach was a member of the board or executive committee of: the Council for Christian Approaches to Defence, the Centre for Defence Studies (King's College London), the Verification Technology Information Centre (VERTIC), the International Security Information Service (ISIS), and of the British Pugwash Group. He lectured and contributed chapters to over two dozen books as well as publishing a number of monographs, articles and book reviews. In 1999 he co-authored, with Nadine Gurr, a book on British nuclear weapons policy and, in 2001, a briefing paper on cluster bombs,

In January 2009, The Times newspaper published a joint letter from Field Marshal Lord Bramall, General Lord Ramsbotham and General Beach arguing that the UK government should fund more realistic military needs rather than perpetuate its Trident programme, arguing that:

Nuclear weapons have shown themselves to be completely useless as a deterrent to the threats and scale of violence we currently, or are likely to, face — particularly international terrorism; and the more you analyse them the more unusable they appear.

Beach died 4 September 2019 at age 96.

== Personal life ==
Beach married Estelle Mary Henry, a doctor, in 1951. She died from an aortic embolism in 1989.

== Honours ==
Beach held honorary Doctorate of Civil Laws from the University of Kent in Canterbury (1990). He was an honorary fellow of Peterhouse, Cambridge and of the Chartered Institute of Building Service Engineers, a Fellow of the Royal Society of Arts and a Companion of the Chartered Management Institute.

The Cuinchy Bridge, where he was injured in September 1944, was named "Hugh Beach Bridge" in his honor, in September 2021.

Military offices
Preceded by Patrick Howard-Dobson	Commandant of the Staff College, Camberley; 1974–1975	Succeeded by John Stanier
Preceded by Sir Allan Taylor	Deputy C-in-C UK Land Forces; 1976–1977	Succeeded by Sir Peter Hudson
Preceded by Sir John Gibbon	Master-General of the Ordnance; 1977–1981	Succeeded by Sir Peter Leng
Honorary titles
Preceded by Sir David Willison	Chief Royal Engineer; 1982–1987	Succeeded by Sir George Cooper
