= Claude Moore =

British Army officer

Major-General Claude Moore CB CMG DSO
- Born: 9 February 1875
- Died: September 1928 (aged 53)
- Military career
- Allegiance: United Kingdom
- Branch: British Army
- Rank: Major-General
- Commands: 157th (Highland Light Infantry) Brigade; Ahmednagar Brigade; 42nd (East Lancashire) Infantry Division
- Conflicts: Second Boer War; First World War
- Awards: Companion of the Order of the Bath; Companion of the Order of St Michael and St George; Distinguished Service Order

Major-General Claude Douglas Hamilton Moore, CB, CMG, DSO (9 February 1875 – September 1928) was a British Army officer.

== Military career ==
Moore was commissioned into the Suffolk Regiment on 27 November 1895. After transferring to the Royal Warwickshire Regiment, he fought in the Second Boer War. He was promoted to captain on 16 November 1901 and on 1 July 1904 became an adjutant.

He also saw action on the Western Front in the early stages of the First World War for which he was appointed a Companion of the Distinguished Service Order. He became commander of the 157th (Highland Light Infantry) Brigade serving in the Middle Eastern theatre in October 1916 before later becoming commander of the Ahmednagar Brigade in India in January 1920. He was promoted to colonel on 16 January 1920.

He was promoted to major general on 1 January 1925 and appointed a Companion of the Order of the Bath (CB) in the 1925 Birthday Honours. He became general officer commanding (GOC) of the 42nd (East Lancashire) Infantry Division, a Territorial Army (TA) formation, on 18 March 1927, succeeding Major General Arthur Solly-Flood.

He held this command until his death at the age of 53 in September 1928.

Military offices
Preceded by Arthur Solly-Flood	GOC 42nd (East Lancashire) Infantry Division; 1927–1928	Succeeded by William Beach
