= Robin Carnegie =

British Army general

Lieutenant-General Sir Robin Carnegie KCB OBE DL
- Born: 22 June 1926
- Died: 1 January 2011 (aged 84); Salisbury Hospice
- Military career
- Allegiance: United Kingdom
- Branch: British Army
- Service years: 1946–1982
- Rank: Lieutenant-General
- Commands: The Queen's Own Hussars; 11th Armoured Brigade; 3rd Division
- Awards: Knight Commander of the Order of the Bath; Officer of the Order of the British Empire

Lieutenant-General Sir Robin Macdonald Carnegie KCB OBE DL (22 June 1926 – 1 January 2011) was a senior British Army officer who became military secretary. He died peacefully in Salisbury Hospice.

== Military career ==
Educated at Rugby School, Carnegie was commissioned into the 7th Hussars in 1946. He was made commanding officer of the Queen's Own Hussars in 1967. He went on to be commander of 11th Armoured Brigade in 1971 and general officer commanding 3rd Division in 1974. He became chief of staff at Headquarters British Army of the Rhine in 1976 and military secretary in 1978. He went on to be director-general of army training in 1981.

He was also colonel of the Queen's Own Hussars between 1981 and 1987.

== Family ==
In 1955, Carnegie married Iona, daughter of John Sinclair. They had one son and two daughters and five grandchildren. Lady Carnegie died in 2015.

Military offices
Preceded by Richard Worsley	General Officer Commanding the 3rd Division; 1974–1976	Succeeded by Michael Walsh
Preceded by Sir Robert Ford	Military Secretary; 1978–1980	Succeeded by Sir Roland Guy
