= South West District (British Army) =

- Active: 1967–1995
- Country: United Kingdom
- Branch: British Army
- Type: District Command
- Garrison/HQ: Bulford Camp

South West District was a district command of the British Army between 1967 and 1995.

== History ==
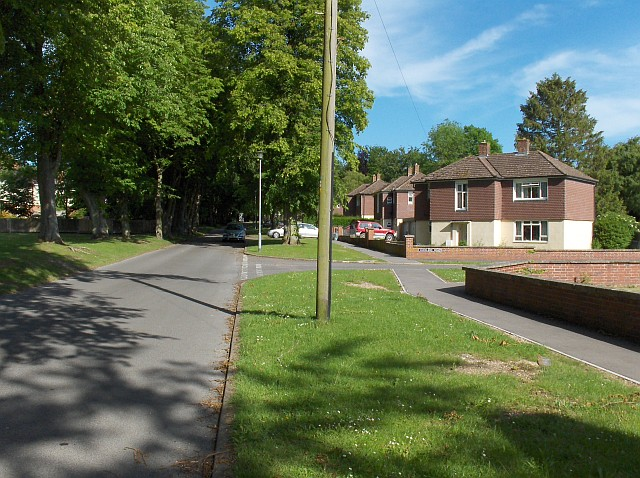
Bulford Camp, command headquarters

The district was formed from 43rd (Wessex) Infantry Division as part of the Territorial Army Volunteer Reserve in 1967. It had its headquarters at Bulford Camp, Wiltshire, and was placed under the command of HQ United Kingdom Land Forces in 1972.

In 1984-85 the district controlled a number of individual units, including 94th Locating Regiment, Royal Artillery at Roberts Barracks, Larkhill; the Support Regiment RA; Headquarters 7 Regiment Army Air Corps; the UK contingent of the ACE Mobile Force; 1st Infantry Brigade at Tidworth; 43 Wessex Brigade in Exeter; and five planned companies of the Home Service Force.

In 1992, Headquarters South West District controlled three of the Army's 20 training areas on Salisbury Plain.

The district was disbanded on the formation of HQ Land Command in 1995.

== Commanders ==
General officers commanding included:

- 1967–1970 Major-General Thomas Acton
- 1970–1971 Major-General John Douglas-Withers
- 1972–1974 Major-General Hugh Cunningham
- 1974–1975 Major-General George Cooper
- 1975–1978 Major-General Robert Lyon
- 1978–1981 Major-General Sir John Acland
- 1981–1984 Major-General Michael Gray
- 1984–1987 Major-General Barry Lane
- 1987–1990 Major-General Anthony Jeapes
- 1990–1992 Major-General Anthony Pollard

== See also ==
- Headquarters South West (United Kingdom)
