= Arthur McNamara =

British Army officer

Lieutenant-General Sir Arthur McNamara KCB CMG DSO
- Born: 1877
- Died: 1949 (aged 71–72)
- Military career
- Allegiance: United Kingdom
- Branch: British Army
- Rank: Lieutenant-General
- Commands: 19th Indian Infantry Brigade; Small Arms School; 42nd (East Lancashire) Infantry Division
- Conflicts: First World War
- Awards: Knight Commander of the Order of the Bath; Companion of the Order of St Michael and St George; Distinguished Service Order

Lieutenant-General Sir Arthur Edward McNamara, KCB, CMG, DSO (1877–1949) was a British Army officer.

== Military career ==
McNamara was commissioned into the Queen's Royal Regiment (West Surrey) as a second lieutenant on 20 February 1897, and promoted to lieutenant on 29 September 1898. He served as a signaling officer in South Africa during the Second Boer War (1899–1902), and after the end of this war returned to a regular commission with his regiment in November 1902, with the 2nd battalion station in the Orange River Colony. He was listed on the SS Nubia which left Cape Town for Southampton in December 1902, and was promoted to a captain on 22 January 1903.

He saw action in the First World War for which he was promoted to major in September 1915 and appointed a Companion of the Distinguished Service Order and a Companion of the Order of St Michael and St George (CMG) in the 1918 Birthday Honours. Towards the end of the war he was promoted to the temporary rank of brigadier general and succeeded Brigadier General Edmund Ironside in command of the 2nd Division's 99th Infantry Brigade.

McNamara, who in June 1919 was promoted to brevet colonel, became commander of the 19th Indian Infantry Brigade in India on 22 December 1923 and was granted the temporary rank of colonel commandant whilst so employed. He was made commandant of the Small Arms School in Hythe, Kent, on 7 October 1926, and was again granted the temporary rank of colonel commandant whilst holding this position. He was appointed a Companion of the Order of the Bath (CB) in the 1928 Birthday Honours. After that he became brigadier on the general staff at Eastern Command in February 1929 and, after being promoted to major general in March 1931, was General Officer Commanding 42nd (East Lancashire) Infantry Division in May 1933 and Director of Military Training at the War Office in October 1933. He relinquished this position in August 1936 and was then placed on half-pay. He was advanced to Knight Commander of the Order of the Bath in the 1938 New Year Honours before retiring from the army in August 1938.

Military offices
Preceded by Henry Jackson	Commandant of the Small Arms School; 1926–1929	Succeeded by Robert Collins
Preceded by William Beach	GOC 42nd (East Lancashire) Infantry Division; May–October 1933	Succeeded by Hugh Elles
