= Hugh Cunningham (British Army officer) =

British Army officer (1921–2019)

Lieutenant-General Sir Hugh Cunningham KBE
- Born: 4 November 1921
- Died: 12 September 2019 (aged 97)
- Military career
- Allegiance: United Kingdom
- Branch: British Army
- Service years: 1942–1978
- Rank: Lieutenant-General
- Service number: 224976
- Unit: Royal Engineers
- Commands: 11th Engineering Brigade; South West District
- Conflicts: World War II
- Awards: Knight Commander of the Order of the British Empire

Lieutenant-General Sir Hugh Patrick Cunningham KBE (4 November 1921 – 12 September 2019) was a British Army officer who served as Deputy Chief of the Defence Staff (Operational Requirements).

== Military career ==
Educated at Charterhouse School, Cunningham was commissioned into the Royal Engineers in 1942 and fought in World War II in India, New Guinea and Burma. He was appointed Commander Royal Engineers for 3rd Division in Cyprus and Aden in 1963, Commander of 11th Engineering Brigade in Germany in 1967 and General Officer Commanding South West District in 1971. He went on to be Assistant Chief of the General Staff (Operational Requirements) in 1974 and Deputy Chief of the Defence Staff (Operational Requirements) in 1976 before retiring in 1978.

In retirement he became a Director of Fairey Engineering. He lived at Shaftesbury in Dorset. He was one of the three Presidents of the UK-based charity Action on Addiction.

He died on 12 September 2019 at the age of 97.

Military offices
Preceded by John Douglas-Withers	General Officer Commanding South West District; 1971–1974	Succeeded by George Cooper
Preceded by Frank Caldwell	Assistant Chief of the General Staff; 1974–1975	Succeeded by Henry Roper
Preceded by Sir Michael Giddings	Deputy Chief of the Defence Staff (Operational Requirements); 1976–1978	Succeeded by Sir Stephen Berthon
