= William Jackson (British Army officer) =

British general and author (1917–1999)

General Sir William Jackson GBE KCB KStJ MC*
- Sir William Jackson (left) with Sir Joshua Hassan, Chief Minister of Gibraltar (right), awaiting the arrival in Gibraltar of Charles, Prince of Wales in 1977
- Born: 28 August 1917; Blackpool, Lancashire
- Died: 12 March 1999 (aged 81); Swindon, Wiltshire
- Military career
- Allegiance: United Kingdom
- Branch: British Army
- Service years: 1937–1977
- Rank: General
- Service number: 73056
- Unit: Royal Engineers
- Commands: Northern Command; Gurkha Engineers
- Conflicts: Second World War; Suez Crisis; Malayan Emergency
- Awards: Knight Grand Cross of the Order of the British Empire; Knight Commander of the Order of the Bath; Military Cross & Bar; Mentioned in Despatches

General Sir William Godfrey Fothergill Jackson, GBE, KCB, KStJ, MC & Bar (28 August 1917 – 12 March 1999) was a British Army officer, military historian, author and Governor of Gibraltar.

== Military career ==
Educated at Shrewsbury School, the Royal Military Academy, Woolwich, and King's College, Cambridge, William Jackson was commissioned into the Royal Engineers in August 1937.

He served with the British Army in the Norwegian campaign during the Second World War, which began in September 1939, where he was one of the first British officers to engage the enemy. His work in blowing up bridges as the British retreated from Lillehammer earned Jackson his first Military Cross (MC). He also served in North Africa, Sicily and Italy during the war. He was twice injured by a land mine. The one at Bou Arada in Tunisia placed him in bed for four months before he joined General Dwight D. Eisenhower's headquarters, where the Allied invasion of Sicily was being planned. He won a Bar to his MC in 1944 at the Battle of Monte Cassino in recognition of "gallant and distinguished services", and by the end of the war Jackson was in post as an acting major but was only formally promoted captain in August 1945, having been promoted to lieutenant in 1940. He was also mentioned in despatches in 1945 for his services in Italy.

After the war he became a general staff officer at Headquarters Allied Land Forces, South East Asia in 1945 before moving on to be an instructor at the Staff College, Camberley in 1948. Promoted major in 1950, he was an instructor at the Royal Military Academy, Sandhurst from 1951. He was promoted brevet lieutenant colonel in 1955 and was appointed Assistant Adjutant & Quartermaster General (Plans) at the War Office during the Suez Crisis in 1956. Jackson was appointed an Officer of the Order of the British Empire in the 1957 Birthday Honours. In 1958 he was promoted lieutenant colonel and became Commander, Gurkha Engineers in Malaya. In 1960 he was promoted full colonel and in 1961 returned to the Staff College, Camberley as Colonel General Staff at the Minley Division.

He was Deputy Director of Staff Duties at the War Office from 1962 and joined the Imperial Defence College in 1965 being promoted brigadier in March. He went on to be Director of the Chief of Defence Staff's Unison Planning Staff in 1966 in the temporary rank of major-general (his rank of major-general was confirmed as permanent in July 1966) and Assistant Chief of the General Staff (Operational Requirements) at the Ministry of Defence in 1968.

In 1970 Jackson was promoted to lieutenant-general and appointed General Officer Commanding-in-Chief for Northern Command. He was knighted as a Knight Commander of the Order of the Bath in 1971, and in 1973 he became Quartermaster-General to the Forces in the local rank of full general with formal promotion to general coming four months later. Advanced to Knight Grand Cross of the Order of the British Empire in the 1975 Birthday Honours, Jackson retired from active army service in February 1977, taking a post of Military Historian at the Cabinet Office from 1977 to 1978 and then becoming Governor and Commander-in-Chief of Gibraltar, overseeing the colony's transition to a British dependent territory and where he was a stalwart advocate for self-determination in the territory. He was appointed as Knight of the Most Venerable Order of the Hospital of Saint John of Jerusalem in 1978.

Jackson retired from his post in Gibraltar in 1982 (having had his tenure extended by a year) and returned to being historian at the Cabinet Office until 1987. He had held five honorary military appointments: as ADC General to the Queen (1974–1979), Colonel Commandant the Royal Engineers (1971–1981), Colonel the Gurkha Engineers (1971–1976), Colonel Commandant Royal Army Ordnance Corps (1973–1976) and Colonel of the Territorial Army Volunteer Reserve Engineer and Railway Staff Corps.

== Works ==
- History of the Second World War, The Mediterranean and Middle East, vol. 6 (1984–1988; editor)
- Attack in the West: Napoleon's First Campaign Re-read Today (1953);
- From Fortress to Democracy: Political Biography of Sir Joshua Hassan (1995)
- Seven Roads to Moscow (1957);
- The Battle for Italy (1967);
- The Battle for Rome (1969)
- Alexander of Tunis (1972)
- Overlord: Normandy 1944 (1978);
- Withdrawal From Empire: A Military View (1986)
- The Rock of the Gibraltarians: A History of Gibraltar ISBN 0838632378; (1987)
- The Alternative Third World War, 1985–2035 (1987)
- Britain's Defence Dilemma: An Inside View: Rethinking British Defence Policy in the Post-Imperial Era (1990)
- The Chiefs: the Story of the United Kingdom Chiefs of Staff (1992)
- The Pomp of Yesterday: the Defence of India and the Suez Canal (1995)
- Britain's Triumph and Decline in the Middle East (1996)

== Legacy ==
- His name is given to a large residential estate in Gibraltar (Sir William Jackson Grove).

Military offices
New title	Assistant Chief of the General Staff; 1968–1970	Succeeded by Ian Gill
Preceded by Sir Cecil Blacker	GOC-in-C Northern Command; 1970–1972	Post disbanded
Preceded by Sir Antony Read	Quartermaster-General to the Forces; 1973–1977	Succeeded by Sir Patrick Howard-Dobson
Government offices
Preceded by Sir John Grandy	Governor of Gibraltar; 1978–1982	Succeeded by Sir David Williams
