= Patrick Howard-Dobson =

British Army general (1921–2009)

General Sir Patrick Howard-Dobson GCB
- Born: 12 August 1921; Leicester, Leicestershire, England
- Died: 8 November 2009 (aged 88)
- Military career
- Allegiance: United Kingdom
- Branch: British Army
- Service years: 1941–1981
- Rank: General
- Service number: 189025
- Units: Yorkshire Hussars; 7th Queen's Own Hussars; Queen's Own Hussars
- Commands: Vice-Chief of the Defence Staff; Staff College, Camberley; 20th Armoured Brigade; Queen's Own Hussars
- Conflicts: Second World War
- Awards: Knight Grand Cross of the Order of the Bath; Virtuti Militari (Poland); Silver Star (United States)

General Sir Patrick John Howard-Dobson, GCB (12 August 1921 – 8 November 2009) was a senior British Army officer and Quartermaster-General to the Forces.

== Early life ==
Patrick Howard-Dobson was born on 12 August 1921 in Leicester, Leicestershire, England, and educated at King's College School, Cambridge and Framlingham College.

== Military career ==
During the Second World War, Howard-Dobson was commissioned as a second lieutenant into the Yorkshire Hussars in 1941. He saw action as a tank troop commander in the 7th Queen's Own Hussars, to which he was transferred, during the long withdrawal from Rangoon in Burma during the early stages of the Burma Campaign. The regiment formed part of the 7th Armoured Brigade, and, after serving in India, Iraq, Palestine, Syria, and Egypt, landed in Italy in early May 1944. Howard-Dobson, along with the rest of the brigade, were to remain there for the rest of the war, engaged in the fighting on the Italian Front. He again saw action during the fourth and final Battle of Monte Cassino, and later, while attached to Lieutenant General Władysław Anders's Polish II Corps, at the Battle of Ancona, the fighting on the Gothic Line and, in April 1945, at the Spring 1945 offensive in Italy, which brought an end to the war in Italy. For his distinguished services in the war he was awarded the Polish Virtuti Militari and the US Silver Star.

After being granted a commission in the Regular Army, Howard-Dobson attended the Staff College, Camberley. In 1963 he was made commanding officer of the Queen's Own Hussars and then, in 1965, he was appointed commander of the 20th Armoured Brigade, then serving in Germany as part of the British Army of the Rhine. Following this appointment, he returned to England to attend the Imperial Defence College (now the Royal College of Defence Studies, usually only for officers who were destined to become high-flyers). In 1968 he became the last Chief of Staff at British Far East Command in Singapore. He was Commandant of the Staff College, Camberley from 1972, Military Secretary from 1974 and then Quartermaster-General to the Forces from 1977. In 1979 he was made Vice-Chief of the Defence Staff (Personnel & Logistics). He retired in 1981.

Howard-Dobson lived in Benington, Hertfordshire for over 25 years.

In retirement Howard-Dobson was chairman of the Council of St Luke's Hospital for the Clergy.

== Family ==
In 1946 Howard-Dobson married Barbara Mary Mills and together they had two sons and one daughter.

Honorary titles
Preceded by David Davies	Colonel of the Queen's Own Hussars; 1969–1975	Succeeded by M. Fox
Military offices
Preceded by Allan Taylor	Commandant of the Staff College, Camberley; 1972–1974	Succeeded by Hugh Beach
Preceded by Sir John Sharp	Military Secretary; 1974–1976	Succeeded by Sir Robert Ford
Preceded by Sir William Jackson	Quartermaster-General to the Forces; 1977–1979	Succeeded by Sir Richard Worsley
Preceded by Sir Edwin Bramall	Vice-Chief of the Defence Staff; 1979–1981	Succeeded by Sir David Evans
