= 4th/7th Royal Dragoon Guards =

4th/7th Dragoon Guards 4th/7th Royal Dragoon Guards
- 4th–7th regimental crest and tie colours
- Active: 1922–1992
- Country: United Kingdom
- Branch: British Army
- Type: Royal Armoured Corps
- Role: Main Battle Tank
- Size: 550
- Regimental Headquarters: York
- Motto(s): Quis Separabit (Latin – who shall separate us).
- March: (Quick) St Patrick's Day. (Slow) Regimental Slow March of the 4th/7th Royal Dragoon Guards (amalgam of the slow marches of the 4th and 7th Dragoon Guards)
- Anniversaries: Normandy Day (6 June), Dettingen Day (27 June).

The 4th/7th Royal Dragoon Guards was a cavalry regiment of the British Army formed in 1922. It served in the Second World War. However following the reduction of forces at the end of the Cold War and proposals contained in the Options for Change paper, the regiment was amalgamated with the 5th Royal Inniskilling Dragoon Guards, to form the new Royal Dragoon Guards in 1992.

== History ==
=== Formation ===
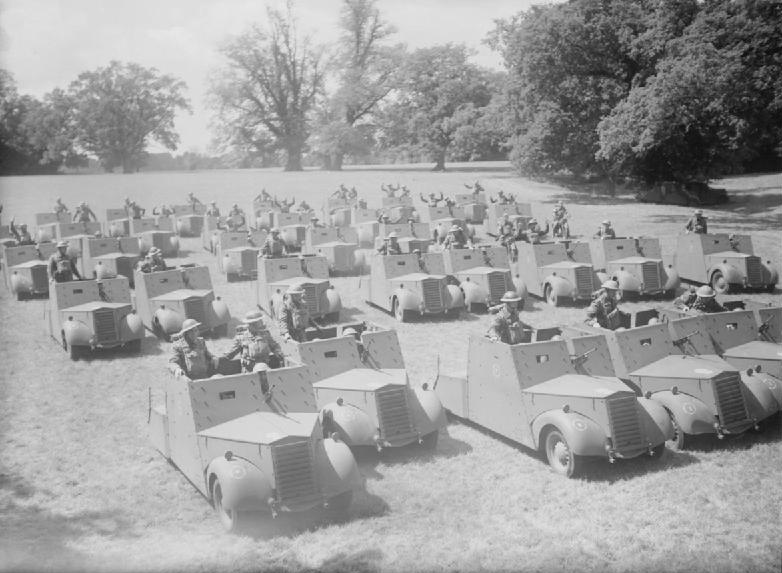
The 4th/7th Royal Dragoon Guards parade with their new Standard Beaverette reconnaissance cars, 25 July 1940

The regiment was formed in India, as the 4th/7th Dragoon Guards, in 1922 by the amalgamation of the 4th (Royal Irish) Dragoon Guards and 7th (Princess Royal's) Dragoon Guards; it gained the distinction Royal in 1936. The regiment returned to the United Kingdom in 1929, was mechanised in 1938, and transferred to the Royal Armoured Corps in 1939 prior to the outbreak of the Second World War.

=== Second World War ===
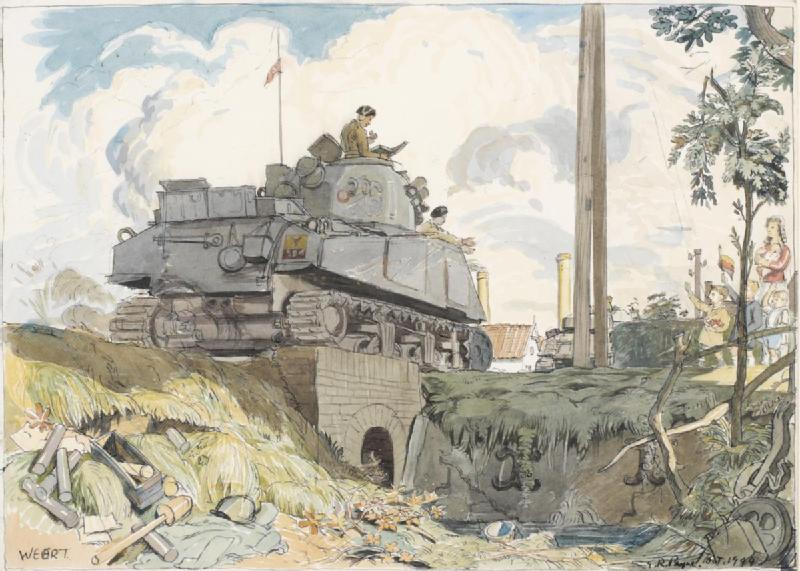
'C' squadron, 4th/7th Royal Dragoon Guards enter Weert, 1 October 1944

In 1939, equipped with Vickers Mk.VI light tanks, it deployed to France with the British Expeditionary Force (BEF), as the reconnaissance regiment of the 2nd Infantry Division under I Corps. It participated in the Battle of France, fighting in northern France and Belgium, and evacuated from Dunkirk in Operation Dynamo. The personnel of the regiment landed in England on 3 June 1940, having abandoned their vehicles.

After re-equipping with Beaverette armoured cars, the regiment was posted to the 1st Armoured Reconnaissance Brigade and then, in December 1940, to the 27th Armoured Brigade, part of 9th Armoured Division, equipped with Covenanter tanks. At this time, a small group of personnel was detached to form the cadre of a new regiment, the 22nd Dragoons. In 1943, the regiment joined 79th Armoured Division, equipping with amphibious Valentine tanks, and later re-equipping with M4 Sherman DD tanks.

Under command of the 8th Armoured Brigade, the regiment landed on King Green, Gold Beach, at 07:20 on 6 June 1944 as part of the D-Day landings, supporting the 50th (Northumbrian) Infantry Division. The regiment later participated in the Battle for the Falaise Gap, and as part of the armoured forces in Operation Market Garden – the regiment pushing as far as Driel, on the south bank of the Rhine a couple of miles from Arnhem. Among other notable achievements, it was the first armoured unit to cross the Seine.

=== Post-war ===
The regiment ended the war in Bremerhaven, and a year later was deployed to Palestine for a tour of duty lasting from 1946–1948. The regiment was then deployed to Libya in June 1948, rotated back to England in November 1952, and then to Lumsden Barracks in Fallingbostel in June 1954 as part of 7th Armoured Division. The regiment returned to England in October 1959 and then went to York Barracks in Munster in August 1962 from where it deployed a squadron to Aden in August 1965. It was posted to Lisanelly Barracks in Omagh in September 1966 from where it sent a squadron to Cyprus in December 1967. It was sent to Athlone Barracks in Sennelager in March 1969, and after returning to the UK in June 1973, went back to Lumsden Barracks in Fallingbostel in October 1976. It returned to the UK again in March 1981 and was then posted to Hobart Barracks in Detmold in April 1983.

=== Amalgamation ===
Following the reduction of forces at the end of the Cold War and proposals contained in the Options for Change paper, the regiment was amalgamated with the 5th Royal Inniskilling Dragoon Guards, to form the new Royal Dragoon Guards in 1992.

== Regimental museum ==
The regimental collection is held in the York Army Museum at the Tower Street drill hall in York.

== Memorials ==
In Norwich Cathedral there are memorial windows to those members of the 7th Dragoon Guards who died in the Second Boer War and World War I. Under the Boer War window there is a pair of brass plates listing 64 names, as well as the laid-up standards of the regiment. Under the WWI window the brass plates list 120 names. An added plate underneath is inscribed 'In Memory of the Officers, Warrant Officers, Non-Commissioned Officers and Troopers of the 4th/7th Royal Dragoon Guards who fell in the Second World War'. There is also a plaque at Eden Camp Museum at Malton, North Yorkshire, to the men of 4th/7th Royal Dragoon Guards who lost their lives 'during the campaigns in North West Europe 1940–1945 and in Palestine 1946–1948', and a framed WWII Roll of Honour in All Saints' Church, Pavement, York, with 150 names of those killed by enemy action, on exercises, or in accidents.

== Commanding Officers ==
The commanding officers have been:

- 1959–1962: Lt.-Col. J. R. Gordon
- 1962–1964: Lt.-Col. H. Rollo S. Pain
- 1962–1966: Lt.-Col. Michael C. Barraclough
- 1966–1967: Lt.-Col. Robert C. Ford
- 1967–1969: Lt.-Col. Nigel T. Bagnall
- 1969–1971: Lt.-Col. W. Reynell Taylor
- 1971–1974: Lt.-Col. Richard E. Holy-Hasted
- 1974–1976: Lt.-Col. Robert J. Baddeley
- 1976–1978: Lt.-Col. Antony R. G. Mullens
- 1978–1981: Lt.-Col. William A Le Blanc-Smith
- 1981–1983: Lt.-Col. Charles T. I. Wright
- 1983–1985: Lt.-Col. Peter A. M. Gilruth
- 1985–1988: Lt.-Col. Clendon D. Daukes
- 1988–1990: Lt.-Col. R. Ian Talbot
- 1990–1992: Lt.-Col. Charles J. G. Thwaites

== Colonels-in-Chief ==
- 1922–: The Princess Royal, VA CI
- 1977–: Hon. Maj-Gen. The Duchess of Kent, GCVO

== Regimental Colonels ==
Colonels of the regiment were:

4th/7th Dragoon Guards

- 1922–1930 (4th): Lt-Gen. Sir Edward Cecil Bethune, KCB, CVO (ex 4th Royal Irish Dragoon Guards)
- 1922–1928 (7th): Maj-Gen. Sir Henry Peter Ewart, Bt., GCVO, KCB (ex 7th Dragoon Guards)
- 1930–1940: Maj-Gen. Arthur Solly-Flood, CB, CMG, DSO

4th/7th Royal Dragoon Guards (1935)

- 1940–1948: Lt-Gen. Sir Adrian Carton de Wiart, VC, KBE, CB, CMG, DSO
- 1948–1958: Maj-Gen. John Aldam Aizlewood, MC
- 1958–1963: Col. Ronald Altham Moulton-Barrett, OBE
- 1963–1973: Maj-Gen. James Arthur d'Avigdor-Goldsmid, CB, OBE, MC, MP
- 1973–1979: Maj-Gen. Ian Gordon Gill, CB, OBE, MC
- 1979–1983: Lt-Gen. Sir Rollo Pain, KCB, MC
- 1983–1989: Gen. Sir Robert Ford, GCB, CBE
- 1989–1992: Brig. Robert John Baddeley, ADC
- 1992: Regiment amalgamated with 5th Royal Inniskilling Dragoon Guards to form The Royal Dragoon Guards
