= Michael Gray (British Army officer) =

British Army officer

Lieutenant General Sir Michael Gray KCB OBE DL
- Born: 3 May 1932; Beverley, East Riding of Yorkshire
- Died: 13 March 2011 (aged 79)
- Military career
- Allegiance: United Kingdom
- Branch: British Army
- Service years: 1950–1988
- Rank: Lieutenant General
- Service number: 424340
- Unit: Royal Artillery
- Commands: South East District (1985–1988); South West District (1981–1984); 16th Parachute Brigade (1977); 1st Battalion, Parachute Regiment (1969–1971)
- Conflicts: Malayan Emergency; The Troubles
- Awards: Knight Commander of the Order of the Bath; Officer of the Order of the British Empire; Officer of the Legion of Honour (France)

Lieutenant General Sir Michael Stuart Gray, KCB, OBE, DL (3 May 1932 – 13 March 2011) was a senior British Army officer. He served as General Officer Commanding South East District from 1985 to 1988, Colonel Commandant of the Parachute Regiment from 1990 to 1993, and Lieutenant of the Tower of London from 1995 to 1998.

== Early life and family ==
Gray's father, Lieutenant Frank Gray, was killed in action while serving with the Royal Naval Volunteer Reserve in 1940. He was educated at Beverley Grammar School, Christ's Hospital, Horsham and at the Royal Military Academy Sandhurst.

In 1958 Gray married Juliette Noon, with whom he was to have two sons and one daughter.

== Military career ==
Gray enlisted in the Royal Artillery in 1950. He was commissioned into the East Yorkshire Regiment in 1952 and served in Malaya for two years during the Malayan Emergency. He transferred to the Parachute Regiment in 1955 and served in Cyprus, Suez Canal Zone, Jordan, Greece, Bahrain, Aden and Northern Ireland. Gray commanded the 1st Battalion, Parachute Regiment from 1969 to 1971. He was appointed an Officer of the Order of the British Empire in 1970. He was Chief of Staff of 1st Armoured Division, British Army of the Rhine (BAOR) from 1973 to 1975 before attending the Royal College of Defence Studies in 1976. He was the last commander of the 16th Parachute Brigade in 1977.

Gray was Head of British Army Staff and Military Attache in Washington, D.C. and Military Advisor to the Governor of Bermuda from 1979 to 1981. He was General Officer Commanding (GOC) South West District, which included command of the United Kingdom Mobile Force, from 1981 to 1984. He was Chief of Staff, BAOR at Rheindahlen from 1984 to 1985. Gray was promoted to lieutenant general in 1985 and was GOC South East District and Commander of Joint Forces HQ at Aldershot. He was appointed a Knight Commander of the Order of the Bath in 1986, and retired from the army in 1988.

Gray was Honorary Colonel of 10th Parachute Battalion from 1984 to 1988 and Deputy Colonel Commandant of the Parachute Regiment from 1986 to 1990. He was Colonel Commandant of the Parachute Regiment from 1990 to 1993.

== Later life ==
In retirement Gray was Chief executive of Rainford Developments from 1990 to 1994. He was awarded the French Legion of Honour in 1994. He was Lieutenant of the Tower of London from 1995 to 1998 and Deputy Lieutenant of the West Riding of Yorkshire in 1997. He also became Chairman of the Airborne Assault Normandy Trust, which seeks to preserve the history of 6th Airborne Division in Normandy, in 1972. He had a leading role in the founding of a museum at Pegasus Bridge and in the restoration of the Merville Battery site.

Gray lived in Pocklington, Yorkshire. He died on 13 March 2011 at York District Hospital.

Military offices
| Preceded by Sir John Acland | GOC South West District; 1981–1984 | Succeeded by Barry Lane |
| Preceded by Sir Geoffrey Howlett | GOC South East District; 1985–1988 | Succeeded by Sir Peter de la Billière |
