= Stephen Berthon =

Royal Navy Vice Admiral (1922–2007)

Vice-Admiral Sir Stephen Berthon KCB
- Born: 24 August 1922
- Died: 30 January 2007 (aged 84)
- Military career
- Allegiance: United Kingdom
- Branch: Royal Navy
- Service years: 1940 - 1981
- Rank: Vice-Admiral
- Commands: HMS Drake
- Conflicts: World War II
- Awards: Knight Commander of the Order of the Bath

Vice-Admiral Sir Stephen Ferrier Berthon KCB (24 August 1922 – 30 January 2007) was a Royal Navy officer who became Deputy Chief of the Defence Staff (Operational Requirements).

== Naval career ==
Educated at The Old Malthouse School and the Royal Naval College, Dartmouth, Berthon joined the Royal Navy in 1940 and saw action during World War II. He joined the Joint Planning Staff at the Admiralty in 1961, became naval attaché in Australia in 1964 before being appointed Director of Defence Policy at the Ministry of Defence in 1968. He went on to be Commodore at the Naval base HMS Drake in 1971, Flag Officer Medway and Port Admiral Chatham in 1974 and Assistant Chief of the Naval Staff (Operational Requirements) in 1976. He was promoted to vice admiral on 2 September 1977, before finishing as Deputy Chief of the Defence Staff (Operational Requirements) in 1978 and retiring in 1981.

== Family ==
In 1948 he married Elizabeth Leigh-Bennett; they had two sons and two daughters.

Military offices
Preceded by Sir Hugh Cunningham	Deputy Chief of the Defence Staff (Operational Requirements); 1978–1981	Succeeded by Sir Maurice Johnston
