= Anthony Pollard (British Army officer) =

Major-General Anthony Pollard CB CBE DL
- Born: 8 April 1937 (age 89)
- Military career
- Allegiance: United Kingdom
- Branch: British Army
- Service years: 1956–1992
- Rank: Major-General
- Service number: 446685
- Commands: 1st Battalion, Royal Anglian Regiment; British Forces, Belize; School of Infantry; British military mission to Uganda; South West District
- Conflicts: Cyprus Emergency; Indonesia–Malaysia confrontation Northern Ireland
- Awards: Companion of the Order of the Bath; Commander of the Order of the British Empire

Major-General Anthony John Griffin Pollard CB CBE DL (born 8 April 1937) is a former British Army officer.

== Military career ==
Educated at Oakham School and Jesus College, Cambridge, Pollard was commissioned into the Royal Leicestershire Regiment in 1956. As a junior officer he saw action during the Cyprus Emergency and the Indonesia–Malaysia confrontation. He became commanding officer of 1st Battalion, the Royal Anglian Regiment in 1977 in which role he was deployed to Northern Ireland during the Troubles. He went on to be commander of British Forces, Belize in 1983, commandant of the School of Infantry in 1984 and commander of the British military mission to Uganda in 1985. After that he became Director-General of Training and Doctrine (Army) in 1987 and General Officer Commanding South West District in 1990 before retiring in 1992.

He was appointed a Companion of the Order of the Bath in the 1992 Birthday Honours.

He is married to Marie-Luise; they have four sons.

Military offices
| Preceded by Tony Jeapes | General Officer Commanding South West District; 1990–1992 | Succeeded by District abolished |
