= Queen's Own Hussars =

- Crest and tie colours of the Queen's Own Hussars
- Active: 1958–1993
- Country: United Kingdom
- Branch: British Army
- Type: Royal Armoured Corps
- Role: Light Cavalry
- Size: 1 Regiment
- Mottos: Nec Aspera Terrent (Latin, Nor do difficulties deter)
- March: (Canter) The Campbells Are Coming; (Trot) Encore; (Quick) Light Cavalry, Robert the Devil and Bannocks o'Barley Meal; (Inspection) The Dettigen March; (Slow) The 3rd Hussars Slow March and Garb of Old Gaul
- Mascot: Drum Horse
- Anniversaries: Waterloo Day; Dettigen Day; Colonel in Chief's Birthday; El Alamein Day.

Commanders
- Colonel-in-Chief: Queen Elizabeth The Queen Mother

The Queen's Own Hussars (QOH), was a cavalry regiment of the British Army, formed from the amalgamation of the 3rd The King's Own Hussars and the 7th Queen's Own Hussars at Candahar Barracks, Tidworth in 1958. The regiment served in Aden and Northern Ireland and as part of the British Army of the Rhine. The regiment was amalgamated with the Queen's Royal Irish Hussars to form the Queen's Royal Hussars on 1 September 1993.

== History ==
The regiment was formed from the amalgamation of the 3rd The King's Own Hussars and the 7th Queen's Own Hussars at Candahar Barracks, Tidworth in November 1958. The regiment remained at Tidworth as an armoured regiment within 3rd Armoured Division. One squadron was sent to Warminster as Demonstration Squadron to School of Infantry in March 1959 and another was sent to Aden in February 1960. The regiment was re-deployed to York Barracks in Munster as an armoured regiment within 6th Infantry Brigade in July 1960 and then was sent to Hobart Barracks in Detmold as an armoured regiment in 20th Armoured Brigade Group in August 1962.

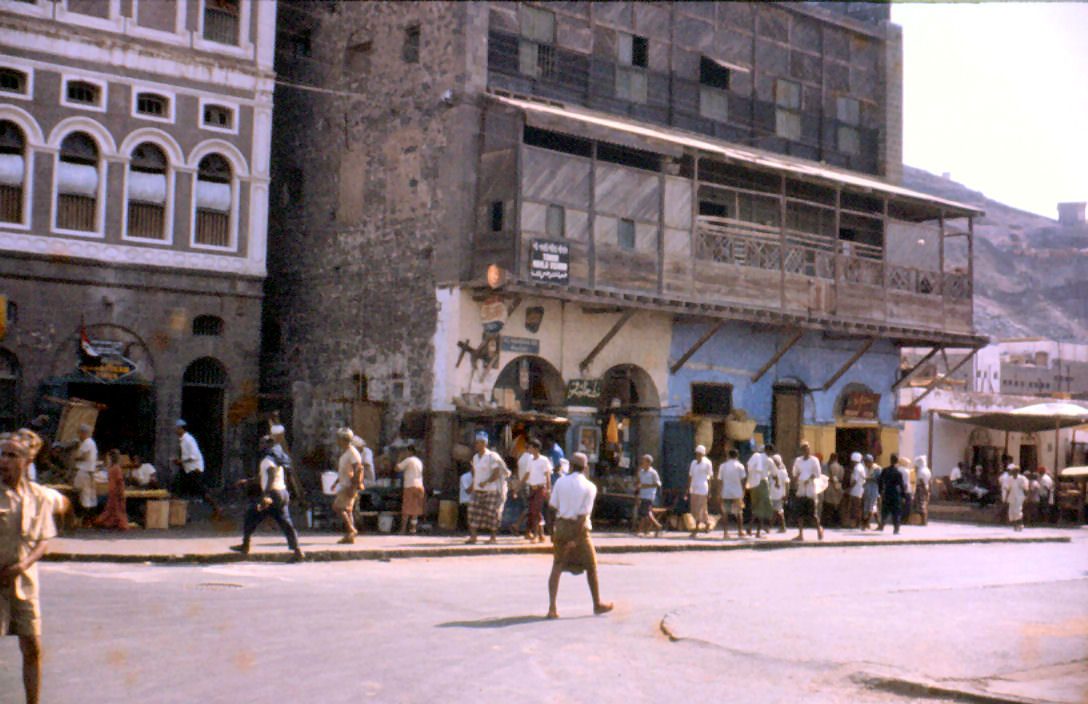
A view of Aden in 1960 when the regiment was deployed there

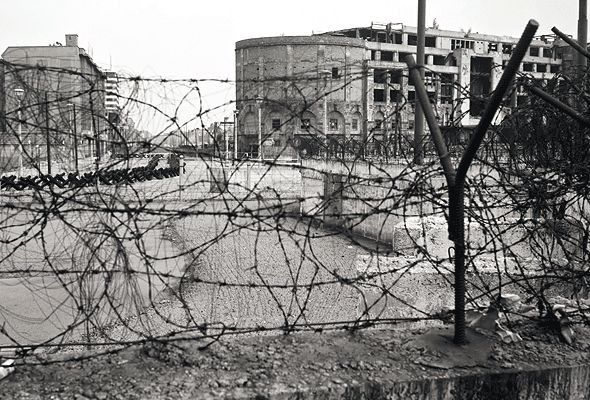
A view of Berlin in 1965 when the regiment was deployed there

The regiment was re-roled as a training regiment based at Cambrai Barracks at Catterick Garrison in February 1965, except for one squadron which was deployed as Berlin Armoured Squadron in West Germany. In February 1967 the regiment moved to Maresfield Camp from where squadrons were deployed to Aden in July 1967, to Sharjah in July 1967, to Singapore in October 1968 and to Cyprus in June 1969. It was re-roled again as an armoured regiment in 7th Armoured Brigade based at Caen Barracks in Hohne in August 1970: from there squadrons were deployed to Northern Ireland at the height of the Troubles. It moved to Bovington Camp as the RAC Centre regiment in August 1974 and to Hobart Barracks in Detmold as an armoured regiment in 20 Armoured Brigade in May 1976 from where further tours in Northern Ireland were conducted. The regiment returned to Cambrai Barracks at Catterick as RAC Training Regiment in April 1983 and then re-roled as armoured regiment for 22nd Armoured Brigade at Caen Barracks in Hohne in January 1985. From there squadrons were deployed to Cyprus for duty as an armoured reconnaissance unit and to Northern Ireland for duty as the Maze prison guard force.

The regiment was amalgamated with the Queen's Royal Irish Hussars to form the Queen's Royal Hussars on 1 September 1993.

== Regimental museum ==
The Queen's Own Hussars Museum was based at Lord Leycester Hospital in Warwick until 2016. The regimental collection subsequently moved to a new facility in Warwick known as "Trinity Mews".

== Colonels of the regiment ==
Colonels of the regiment were as follows:

- 1958–1962: Major-general Ralph Younger CB CBE DSO MC DL JP
- 1926–1965: Colonel Sir Douglas Scott, Bt
- 1965–1969: Brigadier David Hugh Davies MC
- 1969–1975: Lieutenant-general Sir Patrick Howard-Dobson GCB ADC Gen
- 1975–1981: Colonel Marcus Fox MC
- 1981–1987: Lieutenant-general Sir Robin Carnegie KCB OBE
- 1987–1993: Brigadier James Rucker

== Commanding officers ==
Commanding officers:

- 1958–1961: Lieutenant Colonel David H. Davies
- 1961–1963: Lt Col Marcus Fox
- 1963–1965: Lt Col Patrick John Howard-Dobson
- 1965–1967: Lt Col A. Michael L. Hogge
- 1967–1969: Lt Col Robin MacDonald Carnegie
- 1969–1971: Lt Col Michael B. Pritchard
- 1971–1974: Lt Col John B. Venner
- 1974–1976: Lt Col James W. F. Rucker
- 1976–1979: Lt Col Robin D. H. H. Greenwood
- 1979–1982: Lt Col Hugh Michael Sandars
- 1982–1984: Lt Col Jeremy Julian Joseph Phipps
- 1984–1987: Lt Col David John Malcolm Jenkins
- 1987–1989: Lt Col Richard S. Fox
- 1989–1992: Lt Col Charles W. M. Carter
- 1992–1993: Lt Col Michael R. Bromley-Gardner

== Alliances ==
The regiment's alliances were as follows:

- Canada 87th Field Battery Royal Canadian Artillery
- Canada 7th/XI Hussars
- Canada 19th Alberta Dragoons
- Canada Sherbrooke Hussars
- Australia 3rd/9th Light Horse (South Australian Mounted Rifles)
- New Zealand Waikato Regiment
- New Zealand Wellington East Coast Regiment
- New Zealand Queen Alexandra's Mounted Rifles
- South Africa Umvoti Mounter Rifles

== See also ==
- The Queen's Own Hussars Museum
