= Lord Leycester Hospital =

Grade I listed building in Warwick, United Kingdom

- The Lord Leycester The Union Guilds of Warwick The Chapel of St James the Great
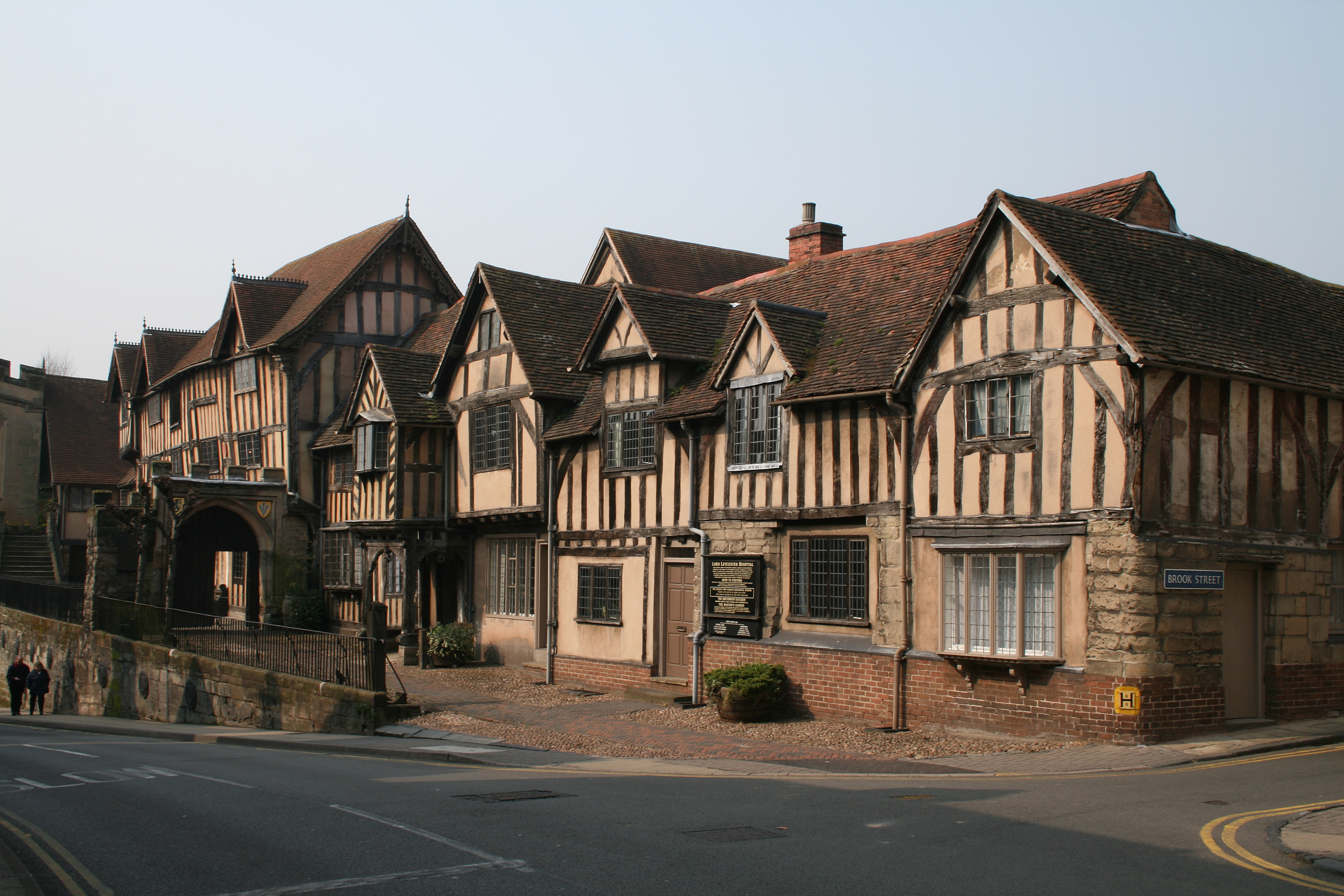
- Lord Leycester Hospital
- Interactive map of Lord Leycester Hospital
- 52°16′47.05″N 1°35′27.62″W
- Location: Warwick, Warwickshire, England

History
- Founded: 1571, by Robert Dudley, Earl of Leicester
- Built: from 1126 to the late 15th century
- Built for: The United Guilds of Warwick

Site notes
- Area: Warwick
- Architectural style: Medieval courtyard architecture
- Restored: Chapel restored 1860, accommodation restored 1966
- Restored by: Chapel restored by Sir George Gilbert Scott
- Governing body: The Lord Leycester Hospital (charity)

Listed Building – Grade I
- Official name: Lord Leycester Hospital
- Designated: 10 January 1953
- Reference no.: 1035441

Listed Building – Grade I
- Official name: Egyptian Urn in Garden of Lord Leicester's Hospital
- Designated: 19 March 1973
- Reference no.: 1364812

Listed Building – Grade II*
- Official name: Norman Arch in Garden of Lord Leicester's Hospital
- Designated: 10 January 1953
- Reference no.: 1184544

National Register of Historic Parks and Gardens
- Official name: Lord Leycester Hospital
- Type: Grade II
- Designated: 28 February 2002
- Reference no.: 1001597

The Lord Leycester Hospital is one of the best preserved examples of medieval courtyard architecture in England and is a charity supporting ex-servicemen. It is located in Warwick, England, next to the West Gate, on High Street. It is a Grade I listed building. The hospital is a prominent feature of Warwick. For almost 900 years buildings have been erected and civic activity has taken place on the site, starting with the chapel built in 1126. The site was donated by the 12th Earl of Warwick in the 14th century to the United Guild of the Holy Trinity and St George. The Guild Hall, Great Hall and Master's House were constructed in the late 15th century. Over the centuries, the ancient buildings and 500 year old gardens have been admired by visitors such as Charles Dickens and Oscar Wilde, King George V and the Queen Mother and travellers from around the world.

== History ==
=== Medieval period ===
The Lord Leycester Hospital started life as just the Chapel of St James the Great which was built over the West Gate of Warwick in 1126 by Roger de Newburgh, 2nd Norman Earl of Warwick. In the late 14th century, it was rebuilt by the 12th Earl of Warwick. He granted the benefice of the Chapel in 1386 to the Guild of St George, a religious guild created on 20 April 1383 under licence from King Richard II. The Guild of the Holy Trinity and the Guild of the Blessed Virgin Mary joined them to form the United Guilds of Warwick. Living quarters and public rooms were added to the chapel including the Great Hall. These form the courtyard of the Lord Leycester that we see today. The Guildhall was built in 1450 by Richard Neville "The Kingmaker", the 16th Earl of Warwick. It was primarily used as a private chamber where the Guilds met to discuss business. The table found in the centre of the Guildhall is thought to have been the original table used by the United Guilds of Warwick where they discussed matters such as trade, religion and politics.

=== Early modern period ===
The United Guilds were dispersed by King Henry VIII in 1546. However, their property had already been transferred to the Burgesses of Warwick by Thomas Oken, Master of the Guilds. The burgesses used the property for meetings and for teaching as, what is now, Warwick School. The 1st Earl of Leicester acquired the buildings in 1571, founding therein a hospital for aged or injured soldiers and their wives, under royal charter from Queen Elizabeth I, run by 12 resident "Brethren" (originally soldiers) under the charge of a "Master", and funded from the income of various estates. In 1617 the Great Hall was used to entertain King James I on his visit to Warwick, an event that left the town in considerable debt. A plaque on the back wall of the Great Hall commemorating the occasion was covered over in Victorian times but uncovered during a recent renovation project.

In 1694, the Great Fire of Warwick started at the Friends Meeting House in Warwick, across the High Street from the Lord Leycester Hospital. The fire was driven up the High Street by a strong south-westerly wind and consumed virtually all the buildings in its path. The original medieval timber-framed houses were destroyed and later replaced by stone and brick built buildings. Of the ancient buildings, only the Lord Leycester Hospital and its near neighbours survive.

=== Modern period ===
The chapel was extensively restored by Sir Gilbert Scott in 1860. The story goes that a representative of his was called from dinner by worried townspeople who thought the chapel may fall down into the High Street. This included the addition of the flying buttresses which today skirt the chapel. In 1956 the Corporation of the Master and Brethren of the Hospital was abolished by Act of Parliament and replaced with a board of Governors. On 3 November 1966 a restored Hospital with modernised quarters was opened by Queen Elizabeth the Queen Mother.

Today the hospital is run by a master, a retired officer of the Armed Forces. Eight ex-servicemen and their wives are provided with flats in return for their past services: they act as guides for visitors. The hospital is funded by visitor income, the original estates having been sold over the years. Heidi Meyer, the first woman to hold the office, was installed as Master in November 2017. The Museum of the Queen's Own Hussars based at the hospital closed in 2016.

== Key features ==
=== The Chapel of St. James the Great ===
The carvings, notably the famous Warwick icon of the bear and ragged staff (or "baculus") and the two-tailed lion from the Dudley family coat of arms, illustrate the renowned craftsmanship in wood of Warwick men. The fine stained glass in the eastern window is the work of the Birmingham firm of Clayton & Bell. Above the south door is a window by William Morris who also designed the hangings around the altar. Every weekday morning (except Mondays) the master and brethren gather for prayers in exactly the same wording directed by Robert Dudley almost 450 years before.

=== The Great Hall ===
Apart from the floor, heating system and public restrooms at the far end, the Hall has changed very little in structure and appearance from the 1300s. It was used by the Guilds for public functions and this has been resumed today for dinners, dances, receptions, concerts and meetings.

=== The Guildhall ===
The Guildhall, today, is used as display space for many of the artefacts collected throughout history. This includes a selection of weaponry, including flintlock muskets sent "by the crown" to the Brethren at the time of the Chartist Riots, Napoleonic swords, thought to have come from the Battle of Waterloo and a cannonball dug up from the Battle of Edge Hill.

=== Egyptian urn ===
The Master's Garden contains a Grade I listed stone urn. 2,000 years old it originally formed part of an Egyptian nilometer.

=== List of weaponry in the Guildhall ===
Below is a list of weaponry that is featured in the Guildhall:

Name	Date
English Infantry Officer's Sword	1837-1845
Italian Officer's Sword	1805-1814
English Light Cavalry Sword	1854
Polish Saxon Sword	c. 1720
English Rank and File Sword	1864
Heavy Cavalry Sword	1748-1778
Copy of Heavy Cavalry Sword	n.d.
Italian Executioner's Sword	1840-1860
Re-Hilted French Cavalry Broadsword	c. 1885
English Dragoon Officer's Sword	1850s
Indian Light Cavalry Officer's Sword	n.d.
Basket Hilted Scottish Broadsword	1600s
American Cutlass	1775-1783
British Cavalry Sword	1908-1912
English Officer's Small Sword	1650s-1700s
Sword from Edge Hill (Edge Hill Sword)	1642
Indian Copy Sword	n.d.
Halberd (2)	pre 1793
Footman's Pike	n.d.
Commemorative WWII Sword	late 20th century
Nepalese Kukri	c. 1919

== Masters and brethren ==
The soldiers living within the walls of the medieval building are known as the brethren. They conduct guided tours of the building and garden while dressed in ceremonial uniforms. The public cafe based in the hospital is named The Great Hall Cafe.

A list of masters of the Lord Leycester Hospital:

List of Masters of the Lord Leycester Hospital
Name	Time as Master	Name	Time as Master	Name	Time as Master
Ralph Griffin	1571-1585	William Burman	1728-1741	Henry Toovey	1901-1922
Thomas Cartwright	1585-1603	Charles Gore	1741-1743	Frederick Page	1922-1937
Symon Buttrys	1603-1605	Edward Tait	1743-1750	James Cropper	1937-1938
Edward Lord	1605-1619	Charles Scottowe	1750-1767	John Johnson	1938-1943
Samuel Burton	1619-1635	George Lillington	1767-1794	John Naylor Frankland	1943-1958
Rice Jem	1635-1650	John Kendall	1794-1844	Stuart Arnold Pears	1958-1966
Timothy White	1650-1661	Henry Berners Shelley Harris	1844-1863	Charles Terence Bethune Tibbits	1966-1967
Thomas Glover	1661-1671	Thomas Cochrane	1863-1867	Hugh Edward Lee	1968-1991
Samuel Jemmat	1671-1713	Phillip Sidney Harris	1867-1884	Dermot Ian Rhodes	1991-2004
Samuel Lydiatt	1713-1726	Herbert Hill	1884-1892	Gerald Franz Lesinski	2004-2016
James Mashbourne	1726-1728	George Morley	1893-1901	Heidi Meyer	2016–Present

== Television appearances ==
The building has been used in many historical-set television productions including Pride and Prejudice, Tom Jones, Moll Flanders, Shakespeare & Hathaway: Private Investigators, A Christmas Carol and the 2007 Doctor Who episode The Shakespeare Code.

== Gallery ==
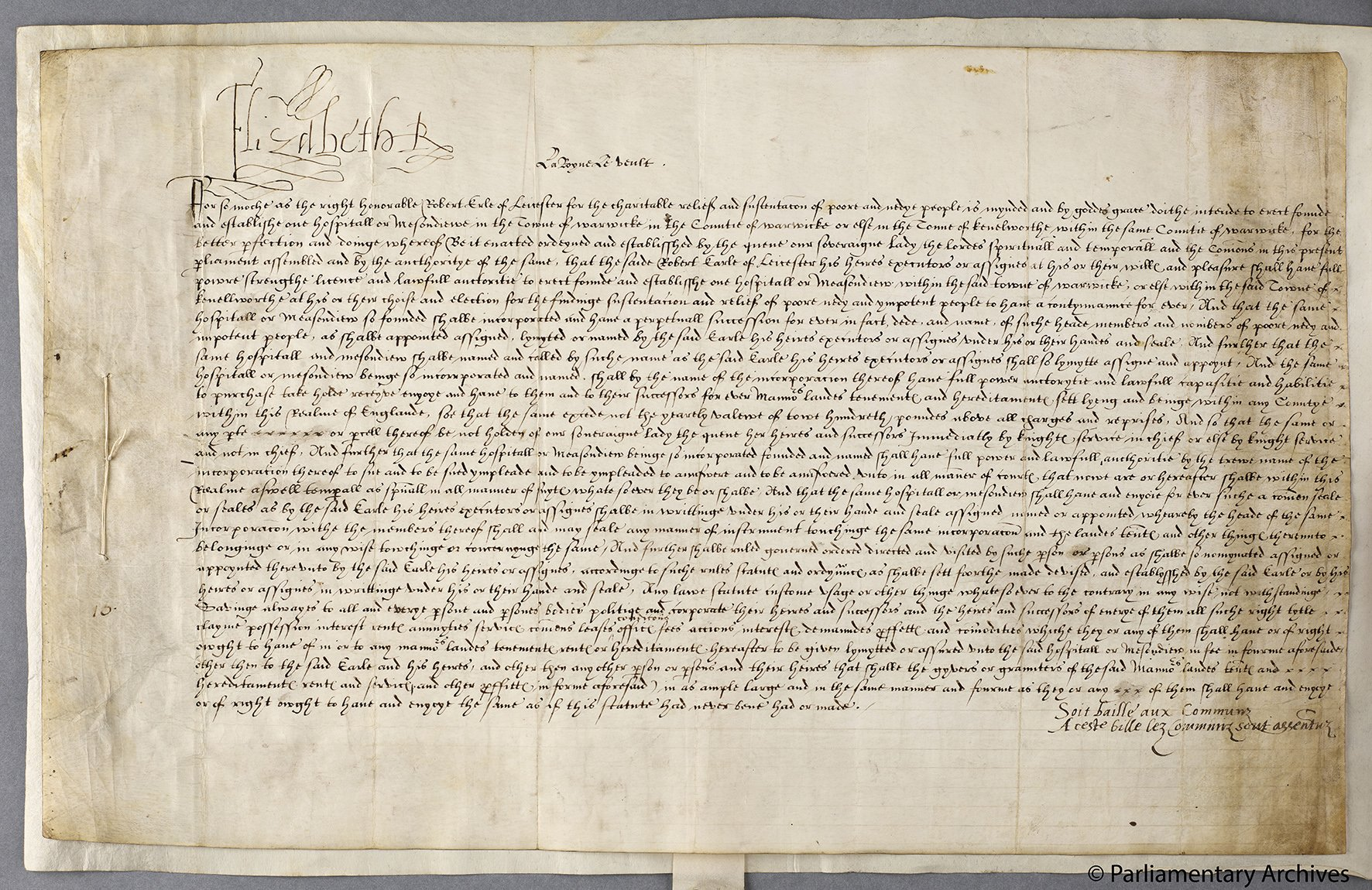
The 1571 Leicester Hospital Act, licensing the Earl of Leicester to found a hospital in Warwick

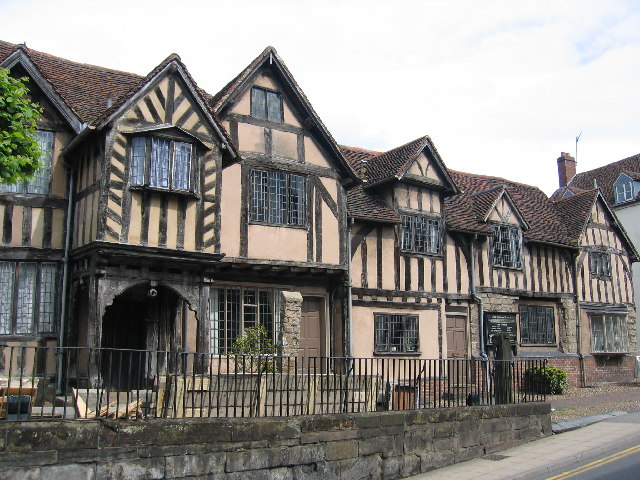
Frontage of the Lord Leycester Hospital

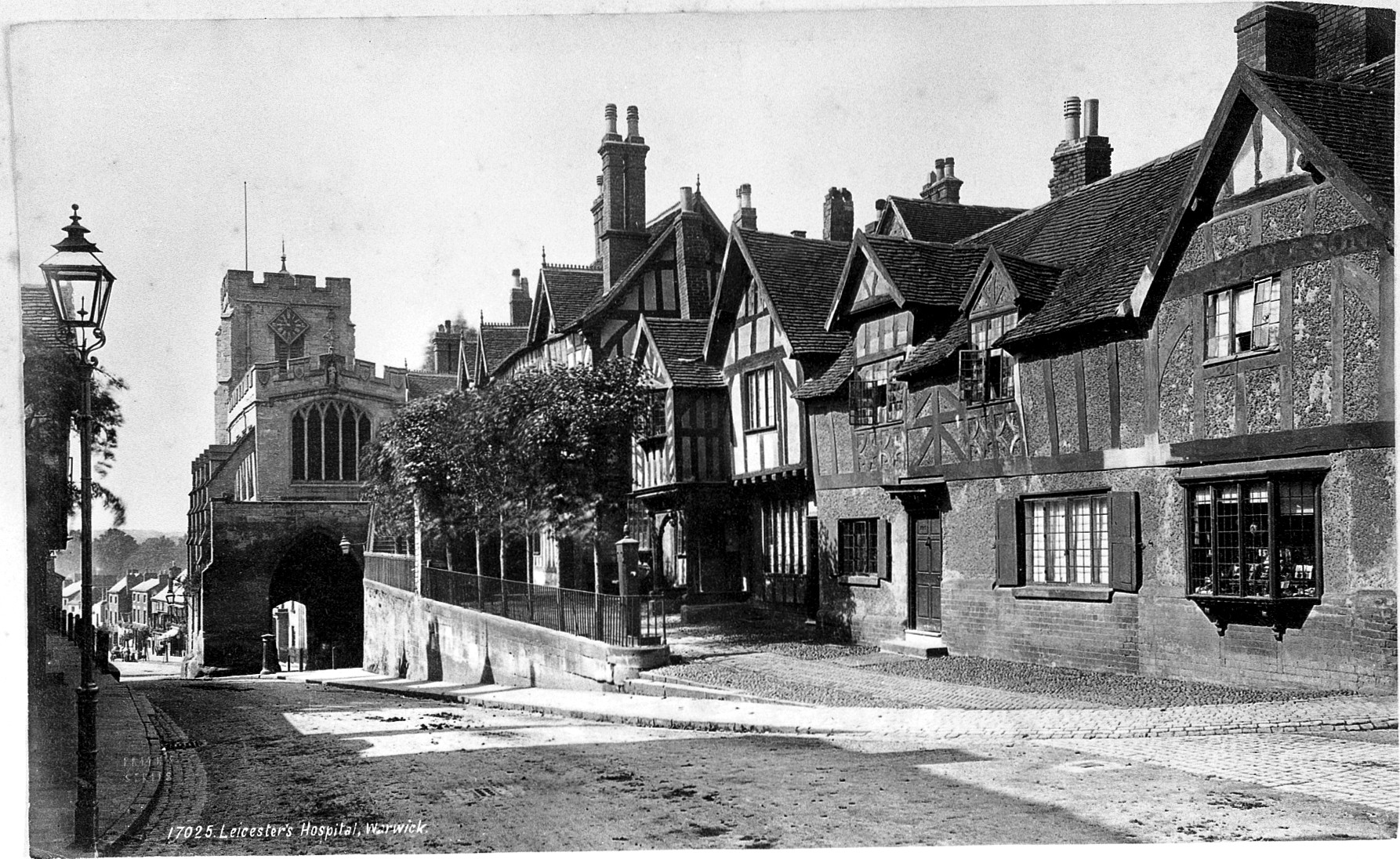
Leicester's Hospital, Warwick (period 1850-98) by Francis Frith

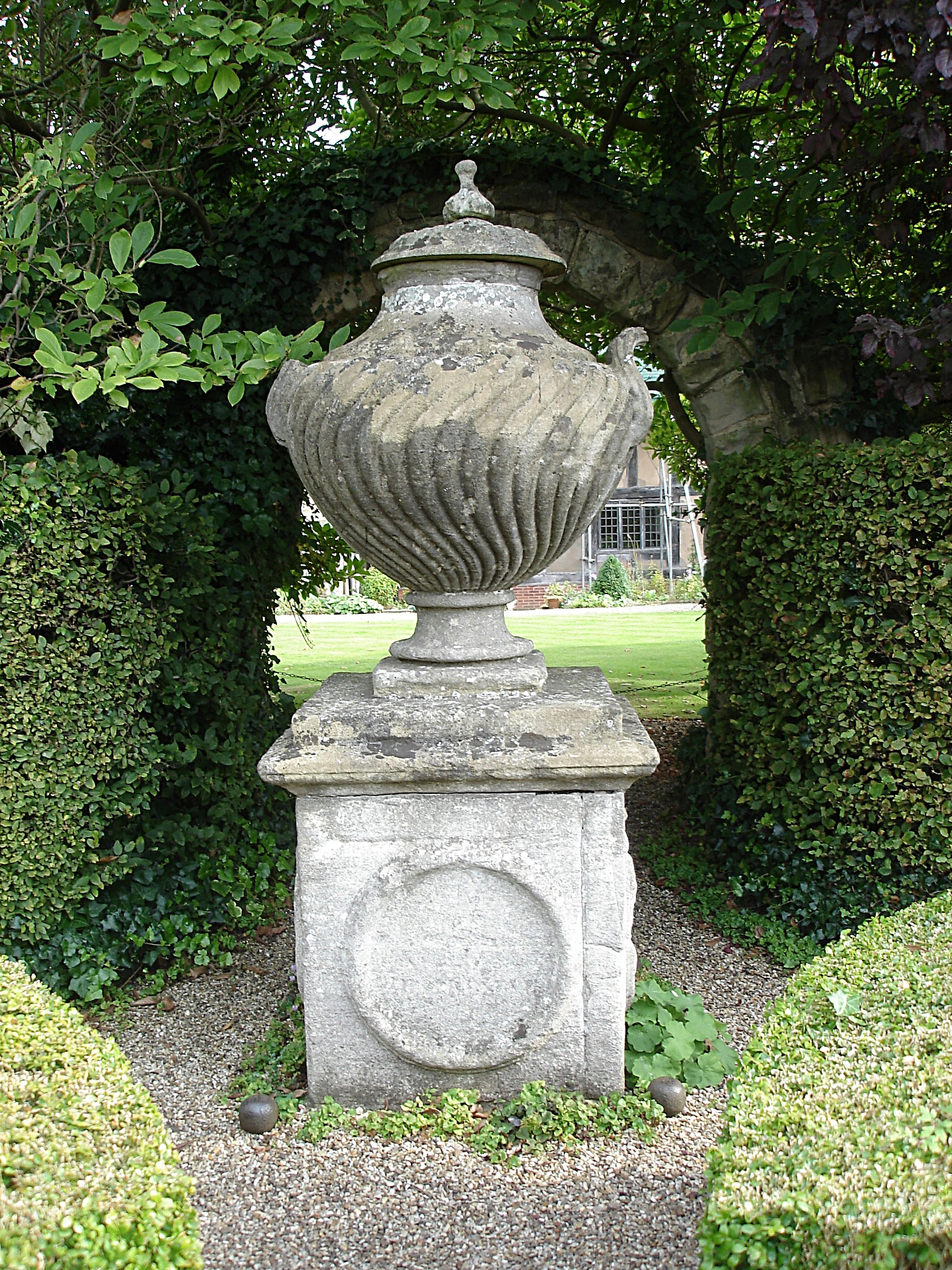
Egyptian Urn supposedly 2,000 years old and once used as a Nilometer (A device used to measure the height of the River Nile) in Ancient Egypt

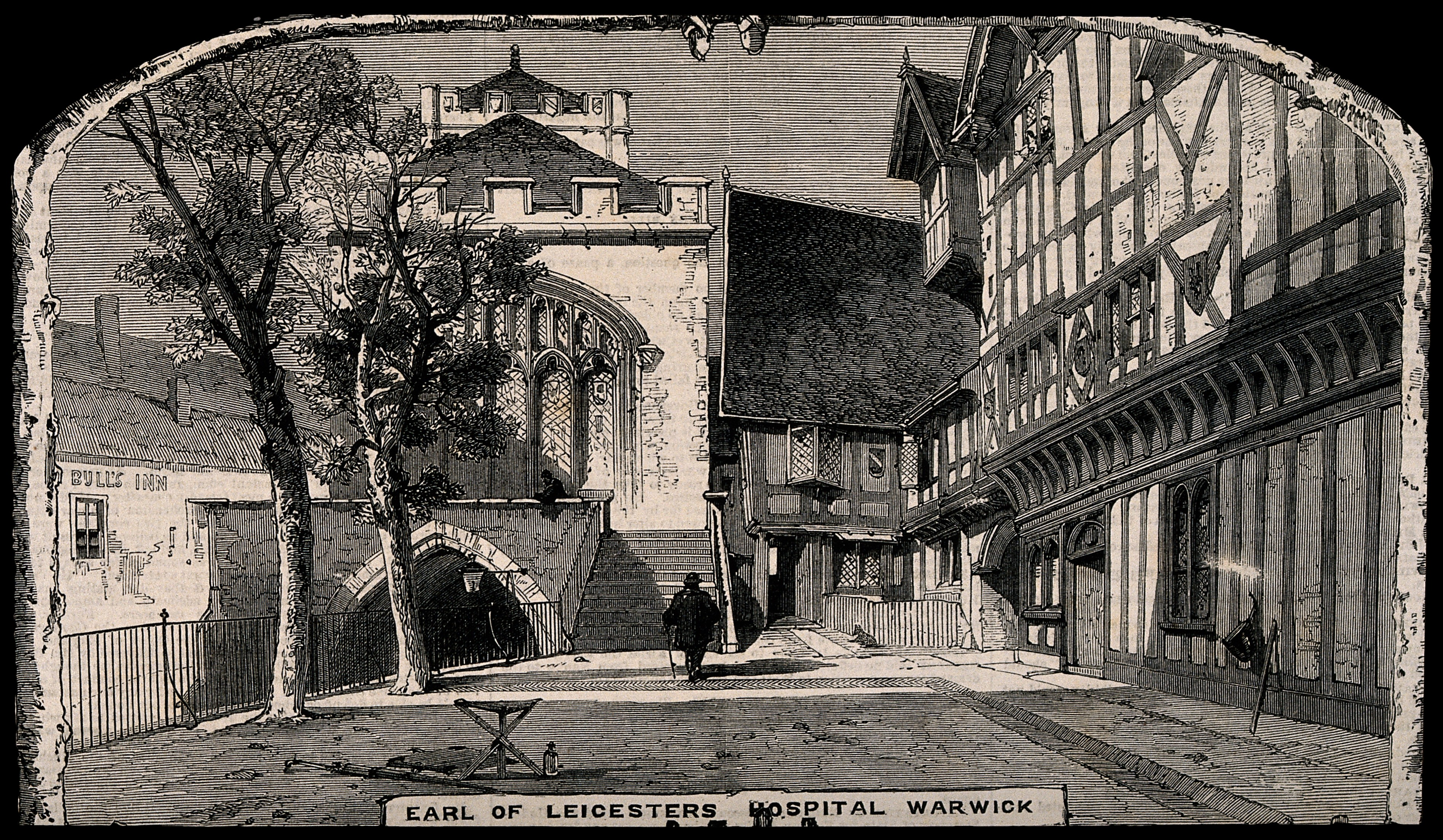
Wood engraving of the walkway across the frontage at the Lord Leycester, looking towards the chapel

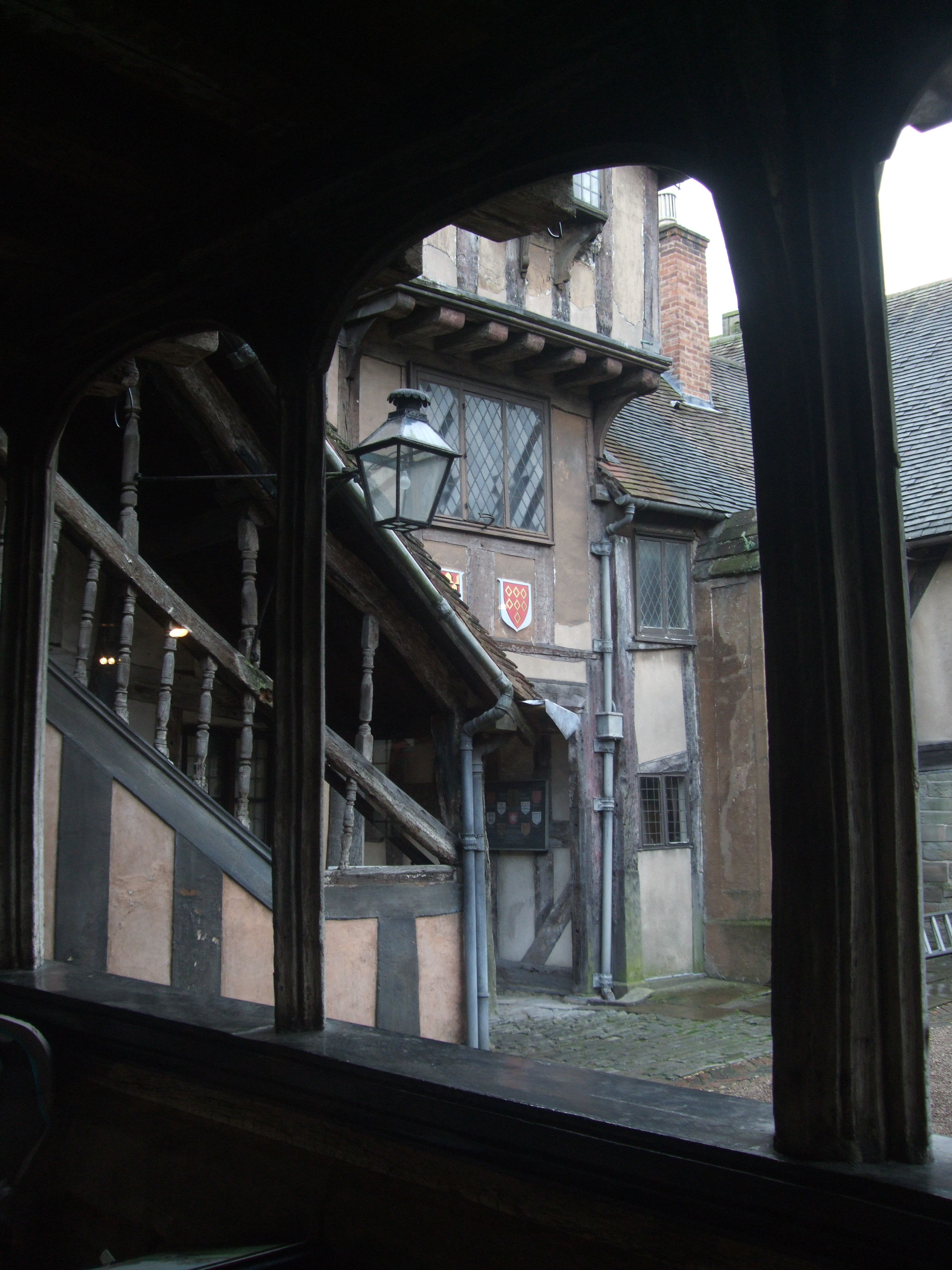
Under the gallery in the courtyard of the hospital

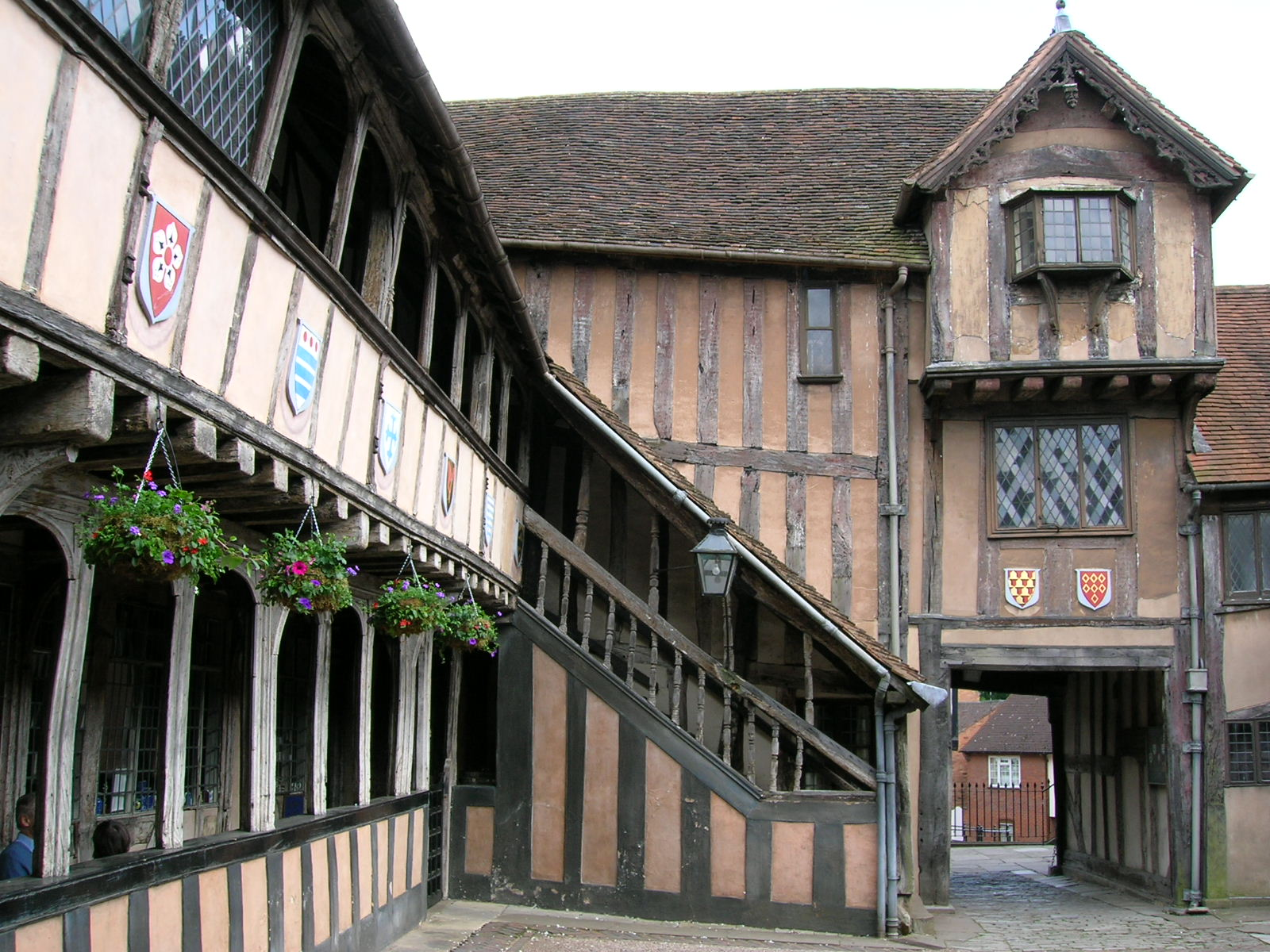
Courtyard of the hospital
