= William Henry Beach =

British Army officer (1871–1952)

Major-General William Henry Beach CB CMG DSO
- Beach in 1936
- Born: 1871; Dublin, Ireland
- Died: 22 July 1952 (aged 80–81); Surrey, England
- Military career
- Allegiance: United Kingdom
- Branch: British Army
- Service years: 1889–1932
- Rank: Major-General
- Commands: Royal Engineers
- Conflicts: First World War
- Awards: Companion of the Order of the Bath; Companion of the Order of St Michael and St George; Distinguished Service Order

Major-General William Henry Beach CB CMG DSO (1871 – 22 July 1952) was a senior British Army officer who played an important role in the campaign in Mesopotamia 1915 to 1918.

== Early life and education ==
William Henry Beach, universally known as Bill Beach, was the son of the late Canon W R Beach, Chaplain to the forces, and Sophia J. Watson, daughter of Dr. Thomas Watson, a well-known physician of Macao and Hong Kong. He was born on 7 June 1871 at 5 Belfast Terrace, Dublin, the younger brother of Thomas Boswall Beach. He was educated at Bloxham School, Wolverhampton Grammar School and the Royal Military Academy Woolwich.

== Military career ==
Beach was commissioned into the Royal Engineers in 1889 and served in Chatham (1890) Shorncliffe (1891), the Curragh (1892–94) and Cairo (1894). In 1895 he was posted to India where he was to spend most of his service. From 1895 to 1898 he served in the Central Public Works Department (Military Works Service and Irrigation Branch) where his activities included constructing a section of the Lower Ganges Canal, as the only European in charge of many hundred Indians. In 1899 he was transferred to the Bengal Sappers and Miners and was promoted captain in 1900. He commanded successively the 6th and 5th Field Companies mainly at Roorkee and, in 1901, worked on the Khushalgarh Kohat Thal (KKT) railway. In 1905 he left the Sappers and Miners to pursue a career on the general staff, serving successively with the Meerut Cavalry Brigade and the Dehra Dun Infantry Brigade. In April and May 1908 the British mounted a punitive expedition against the Mohmand tribes on the North West Frontier where he saw his first active service as Deputy Assistant Quartermaster General to the 3rd Brigade. He was promoted major in 1909 and served for the next two years on the staff of the 7th Meerut Division. In 1912 he joined the staff of Lieutenant-General Sir John Nixon (Commanding the Southern Army) as Assistant Military Secretary.

In April 1915 Nixon took command of Indian Expeditionary Force D, whose task was to invade Mesopotamia (now Iraq), then part of the Ottoman Empire. Beach went with him as head of the Military Intelligence Branch. The Mesopotamian campaign began well, with the rapid advance of a division under Major General Townshend up the Tigris River, with a view to capturing Baghdad. In late November 1915 this advance was halted at the Battle of Ctesiphon, 25 miles south of Baghdad. During this battle Beach received a gunshot wound, the bullet going through his arm and narrowly missing his heart after being deflected by his cigarette case. Townshend withdrew his force in good order to the town of Kut-al-Amara, which he fortified. The Turkish army followed up and, on 7 December, laid siege to the town. It soon became clear that the garrison of Kut, while defensible, could not be re-supplied. The limited air drops available were insufficient. Four successive attempts to break the siege of Kut all failed. On 24 April 1916 an effort by the paddle steamer 'Julnar' to resupply the garrison by river also failed. Food was running out and disease was spreading rapidly. On 29 April, Beach, together with T E Lawrence (later to become known as 'Lawrence of Arabia') and Aubrey Herbert went through the Turkish lines under a white flag, insisting upon an interview with the Turkish commander Halil Kut (Khalil Pasha). Ostensibly seeking to arrange exchanges of wounded and prisoners, Beach had secret permission from London to offer Khalil a bribe. This was brushed aside. The mission failed and on the same day Townshend surrendered. Over 13,000 soldiers became prisoners of war, a major defeat for the British. Nearly all the British commanders involved were removed from their jobs but Beach survived with his reputation unscathed. Nixon, in a despatch, had written of him: ‘As head of the Intelligence Branch he has shown exceptional powers of insight and organisation.’ T E Lawrence, in a report dated May 1916, while deploring that the Intelligence Branch contained no Turkish speakers and only one who knew Arabic, commented that ‘(Beach) is very excellent.’

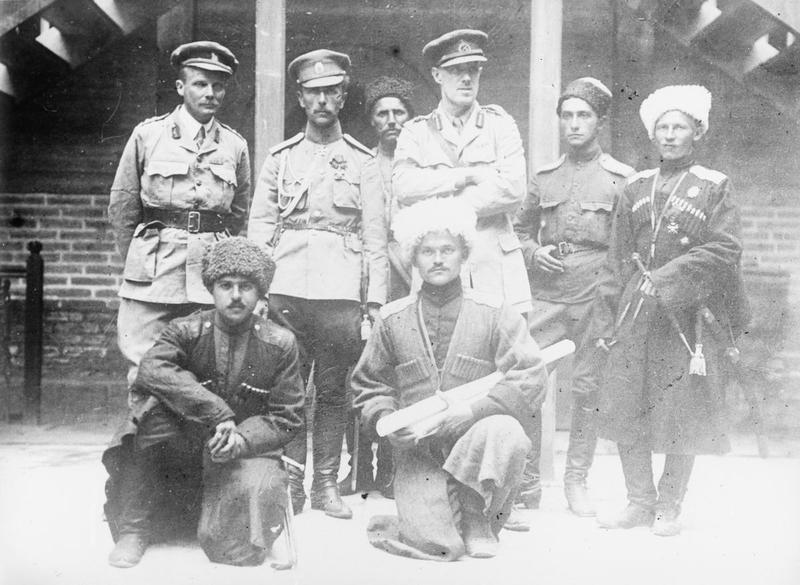
Brigadier General Beach (back row, 3rd from right) with British and Russian officers and men

The remainder of 1916 was spent in reinforcing the British forces and setting up much improved lines of supply. The new commander, General Maude, began an offensive in December 1916 and by March 1917 had captured Baghdad. Further operations took place in the spring of 1918 and again in the autumn culminating in the surrender of Halil with his army, followed by the capture of Mosul on 14 November 1918. During this time the Intelligence Branch was greatly expanded. Beach remained at its head and was promoted successively to lieutenant colonel in January 1916, colonel later that year and brigadier general in January 1917.

When the Ottoman Empire capitulated to the Allies in October 1918, they agreed to withdraw all their troops from the Caucasus, leaving Armenia, Azerbaijan and Georgia as three emergent states, independent of both Russia and Turkey. The British immediately sent a Military Mission to the Caucasus under General George Milne, involving a division of British and Indian troops. They were to secure the withdrawal of the Turkish army, and safeguard the railway and the oil pipeline from Baku on the Caspian to Batum on the Black Sea, so becoming the predominant foreign power there. Beach was posted as head of intelligence to this Mission and wrote reports on several controversial issues including the status of Nagorno Karabakh and the location of the border between Georgia and Russia. But all the borders were disputed, which soon led to bloodshed, particularly between Armenia and Azerbaijan. The British had no clear policy for the region and, by the late summer of 1919, faced with a resurgent Turkey under Mustafa Kemal Atatürk, the Red Army looming on the horizon and general lack of resources, Whitehall decided upon withdrawal. Most of the troops left and Beach was at last free to return to India.

In 1920 Beach became Deputy Director of Intelligence at Army Headquarters India. From 1923 to 1927 he commanded the Jubbulpore Brigade. He then reverted to England on half-pay, being promoted Major General in January 1928. From 1929 to 1932 he commanded the 42nd (East Lancashire) Infantry Division in the Territorial Army, and on 29 April 1931 he was appointed Honorary Colonel of the 42nd (East Lancashire) Divisional Engineers.

== Later life ==
Beach retired in 1932, moved to Camberley, Surrey, and worked on the Council of the Regular Forces Employment Association and on the Council of the Voluntary Aid Detachment. From 1936 to 1941 he was a colonel commandant of the Royal Engineers and chairman of the Royal Engineers Old Comrades Association. He died on 22 July 1952, aged 81, in Hambledon, Surrey.

== Family and other interests ==
On 26 December 1914 Beach married Constance Maud, only daughter of the late Captain Archibald A Cammell, 14th Hussars, of Brookfield Manor Derbyshire in St Stephen's Church Ootacamund (Ooty). After only three months the couple were separated for over four years during Beach's service in Mesopotamia and the Caucasus. They had two children: a daughter June who was born 1921 and died the same year in India, and a son William Gerald Hugh (Hugh Beach) born on 20 May 1923 in South Kensington, London.

Beach was a keen sportsman. In India he took part in polo and pigsticking. In 1913 at Ooty he won the Novices cup on his own horse. He was invited to become Master of the Ooty Hounds but time did not allow. He was also a keen shot, particularly of small game, and fisherman. He was a competent cricketer and played regimental golf with success.

Beach was widely regarded as a humane and respected military leader. His leadership earned the high regard of both his troops and subordinate officers. He demonstrated a strong understanding of the Indian Sappers under his command, who recognized his competence, diligence, fairness, and readiness to assist personnel in need. While commanding the Jubbulpore Brigade, he made efforts to know officers and many enlisted personnel personally. He was respected not only as a commander but also for his personal engagement in the recreational activities of his units. Upon the conclusion of his command, members of the brigade reportedly lined the railway to offer him a collective farewell as he departed for Bombay.

== Honours and awards ==
Beach was awarded the DSO in 1916, CMG in 1917 and CB in 1919. He was awarded the Serbian Order of Karageorge (4th Class) in 1916 and was seven times mentioned in despatches. He was Aide de Camp to King George V from 1922 to 1928.

Military offices
Preceded by Claude Moore	GOC 42nd (East Lancashire) Infantry Division; 1929–1933	Succeeded by Arthur McNamara
