= United Kingdom Land Forces =

Former military command of the British Army

- Active: 1 April 1972 – 1 April 1995
- Country: United Kingdom
- Branch: British Army
- Headquarters: Erskine Barracks, Wilton

United Kingdom Land Forces was a command of the British Army responsible for generating and preparing forces for current and contingency operations. The commander of the forces was known as Commander-in-Chief, United Kingdom Land Forces, who in turn reported to the Chief of the General Staff.

== History ==
On 1 April 1972, HQ Army Strategic Command amalgamated with the three existing geographical commands (Northern Command, Southern Command and Western Command) to form HQ UK Land Forces. It had eight districts plus HQ Scotland and HQ Northern Ireland under its direction:

- London District (HQ in London)
- Eastern District (HQ at Colchester)
- South Eastern District (HQ at Aldershot) (a reformation of a headquarters disbanded in 1903)
- South West District (HQ at Bulford Camp)
- North West District (HQ at Cuerden Hall near Bamber Bridge)
- West Midlands District (HQ at Shrewsbury)
- Headquarters Wales (HQ at Brecon)
- North East District (HQ in York)
- Headquarters Scotland (HQ in Edinburgh)
- Headquarters Northern Ireland (HQ at Lisburn).

North West District headquarters shifted to Fulwood Barracks, Preston, in 1977. In the early 1980s West Midlands District became HQ Western District.

In 1995, HQ UK Land Forces at Wilton assumed control of troops in Germany and most other places. The remaining British Army troops in Germany (including the core of Headquarters Allied Command Europe Rapid Reaction Corps, HQ ARRC) were placed under its command after the disbandment of Headquarters British Army of the Rhine. It became HQ Land Command, and assumed control of almost all British Army combat and combat support units on 1 April 1995. When it was formed it included 69,200 regular troops (6,400 officers and 62,800 other ranks), 59,700 reservists and 14,200 civil servants.

The post of Deputy Commander-in-Chief, UK Land Forces had the rank of Lieutenant General. In 1982, as a result of the 1981 Defence White Paper, this post was redesignated as Commander, United Kingdom Field Army, typically shortened to just 'Commander Field Army'. Commander Field Army oversaw several 'deputy commanders', including one each for the services such as Commander, Royal Corps of Signals or Commander, Transport and Movements (Royal Corps of Transport). The Commander Field Army worked as the official field commander for UK Land Forces during this period, though the post was disestablished in 1995 following the Options for Change.

== Commander-in-Chief, United Kingdom Land Forces ==
See Commander Land Forces
