= Thomas Boswall Beach =

British Army officer

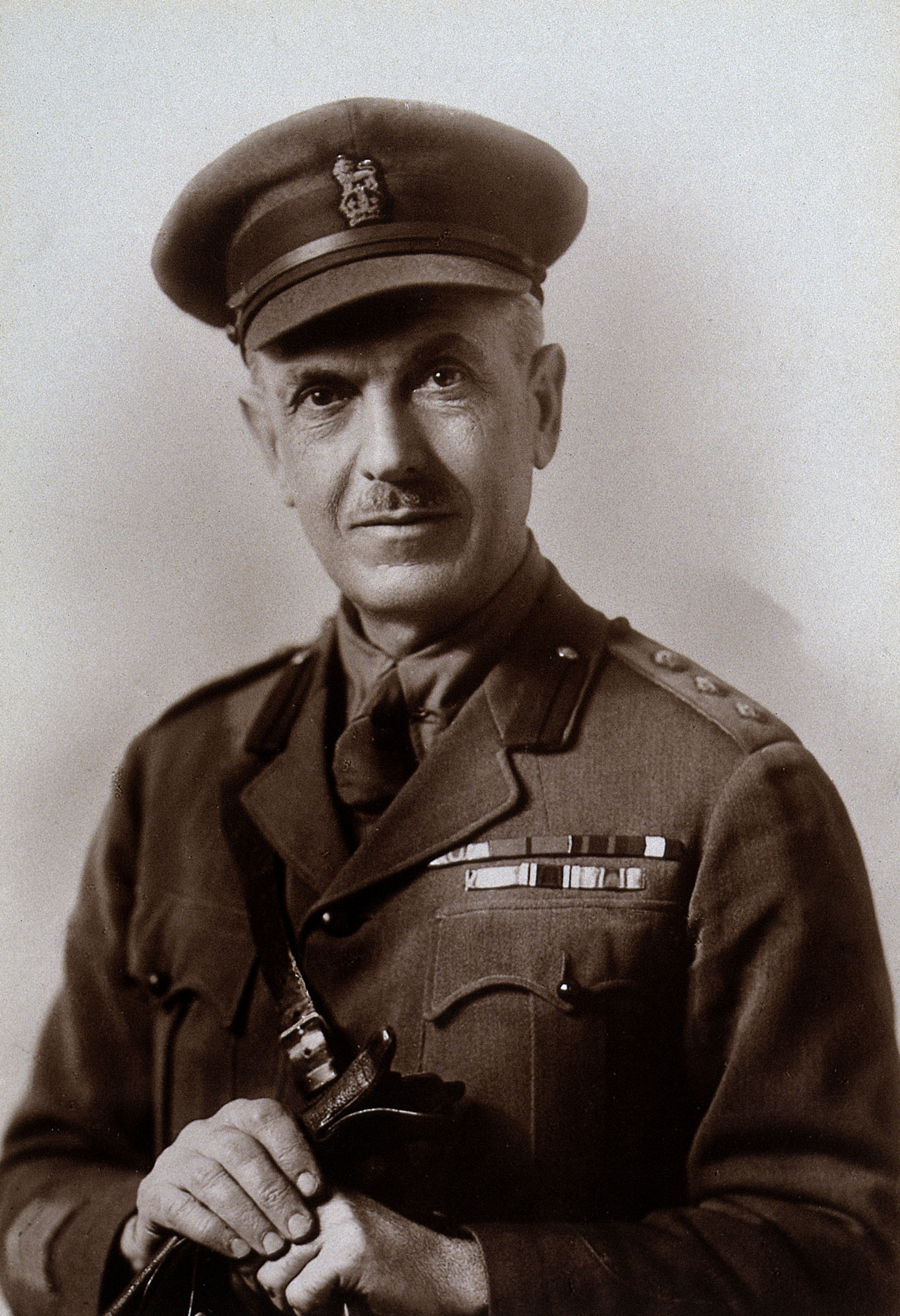
- Portrait by Swaine. Credit: Wellcome Collection
- Born: 28 May 1866; Brompton, England
- Died: 3 April 1941 (aged 74); Reading, England
- Military career
- Allegiance: United Kingdom
- Branch: British Army
- Rank: Colonel
- Unit: Royal Army Medical Corps
- Conflicts: South African War; First World War
- Awards: Queen's Medal with seven clasps, King's South Africa Medal with two clasps, Companion Of St Michael And St George, Mention in Despatches, Commander of the Order of the British Empire.

Colonel Thomas Boswall Beach CMG CBE (28 May 1866 – 3 April 1941) was a British Army officer during the South African War and First World War.

== Life ==
Born at Brompton on 28 May 1866, the elder son of the Rev. Canon W. R. Beach, Chaplain to the Forces, and was educated at Bloxham School (1880–84) and at King's College Hospital, where he gained the Warneford Scholarship and worked under Joseph Lister. He took the M.R.C.S., L.R.C.P. in 1899 and, after serving as house-physician at King's, entered the Army as surgeon in 1891, passing first both into and out of Netley. There he gained the Herbert Prize allotted to the best man of the term and the Montefiore Medal and Prize for Military Surgery. He was the brother of William Henry Beach.

== Military career ==
Boswall became lieutenant-colonel in 1912, Colonel in 1915, went on half-pay in August, 1919, and retired four months later. He served in the South African War in 1899-1902, when he took part in the advance on Kimberley, including the actions at Belmont, Enslin, Modder River, and Magersfontein; and in operations in the Orange River Colony, including the actions at Paardeberg, Poplar Grove, Driefontein, Vet River, and Zand River; in the Transvaal, in the actions at Pretoria, Johannesburg, and Diamond Hill; and in Cape Colony. He was mentioned in dispatches in 1901, received the Queen's medal with seven clasps and the King's medal with two clasps, and was promoted major. In the war of 1914-18 he was mentioned in dispatches in 1916 and received the C.M.G. in the same year and the C.B.E. in 1918, after serving as A.D.M.S. at Alexandria. He had been a member of the British Medical Association for fifty years.
