= List of commanders of the British 1st Division =

1st Division; No. 1 Division; 1st Infantry Division; 1st Mixed Division; 1st British Infantry Division; 1st Armoured Division; 1st (United Kingdom) Armoured Division; 1st (United Kingdom) Division
- The division's first general officer commanding, John Coape Sherbrooke
- Active: Raised and disbanded numerous times between 1809–Present
- Country: United Kingdom
- Branch: British Army
- Engagements: Napoleonic Wars; Crimean War; Anglo-Zulu War; Second Boer War; First World War; Second World War; Gulf War; Iraq War
- Website: Official website

Commanders
- Current commander: Major-General Robert Hedderwick

The 1st Division is a division of the British Army; the division was first formed in 1809. The head of the division is a general officer commanding (GOC), who receives orders from a level above him in the chain of command, and then uses the forces within the division to undertake the mission assigned. In addition to directing the tactical battle the division is involved in, the GOC oversees a staff and the administrative, logistical, medical, training, and discipline of the formation. The 1st Division has had 81 different permanent GOCs over a 200-year history.

Prior to 1809, the British Army did not use divisional formations. As the British military grew in size during the Napoleonic Wars, the need arose for such formations, in order to better organise forces. The 1st Division was formed on 18 June 1809 by Lieutenant-General Arthur Wellesley, and it served in the Peninsular War. After the conclusion of the War of the Sixth Coalition, the division was broken-up in France and its troops dispersed to the UK or dispatched to North America to take part in the War of 1812. It was reformed the following year, when the War of the Seventh Coalition began, and it subsequently fought at the battles of Quatre Bras and Waterloo. In the latter battle, the division's GOC, George Cooke, was severely wounded, while his troops helped repulse the final attack of the day, which had been launched by the French Imperial Guard. With the end of the war, the division became part of the Army of Occupation based in France. It remained there until December 1818, when it was disbanded upon the British withdrawal and the end of the occupation.

During the mid- to late-19th century, several formations bearing the name 1st Division were formed, each for a particular conflict. Per the division's official website, only three such formations form part of its lineage: those that fought in the Crimean War (1854–1856), the Anglo-Zulu War (1879), and the Second Boer War (1899–1900). In 1902, the division was reformed as a permanent formation within the British Army, and was stationed at Aldershot. The division fought in both World Wars. During the First World War (1914–1918), it was deployed to France and fought on the Western Front throughout the conflict. At the First Battle of Ypres, Lieutenant-General Samuel Lomax, the division's GOC, was wounded in action. In 1918, following the Armistice of 11 November 1918, the division marched into Germany and became part of the occupation force, the British Army of the Rhine. In March 1919, the 1st Division was redesignated as the Western Division. It was then reformed as the 1st Division on 4 June 1919, at Aldershot, and was the only division maintained in a state of readiness in the immediate post-war years; detachments were dispatched to take part in the Irish War of Independence, to reinforce the Occupation of Constantinople, and to help oversee the 1935 Saar status referendum. From September to December 1936, the entire division was deployed to Palestine during the opening stages of the Arab revolt, with most of it having been sent back to the UK by the end of the year, with the remaining troops going home in 1937. During the Second World War, the division took part in the Battle of France, the Tunisian campaign, and the Italian campaign. In February 1945, it was transferred from Italy to Palestine and remained there for the duration of the war.

In the ten-year period following the end of the Second World War, the division moved between Palestine, Egypt, and Libya. Then, in November 1955, it returned to the UK where it remained for five years until it was disbanded on 30 June 1960. The following day in Germany, 1 July 1960, the 5th Division was redesignated as the 1st Division. On 1 April 1978, the division was renamed as the 1st Armoured Division, which subsequently fought in the Gulf War, where it overran five Iraqi divisions, and took 7,000 prisoners, during a 48-hour period. With the end of the Cold War, the British government enacted Options for Change, which resulted in the division being disbanded in Germany on 31 December 1992. It was soon reformed, when in July 1993 the 4th Armoured Division was redesignated as the 1st (UK) Armoured Division. Peacekeeping operations in Bosnia, Cyprus, and Kosovo followed during the mid to late 1990s. In 2003, the division led the British contribution to the invasion of Iraq. As part of the Army 2020 restructuring, the formation was renamed the 1st (United Kingdom) Division and was relocated from Germany to York, England.

== General officer commanding ==
General officer commanding
No.	General officer commanding	Rank	Appointment date	Notes	Source(s)
1	Sir John Coape Sherbrooke	Lieutenant-General	18 June 1809	The division was formed for the first time, during the Peninsular War, from battalions from the British foot guards as well as the King's German Legion that were based in Portugal. Due to the large number of aristocrats within the division, it was dubbed "The Gentlemens' Sons'". In April 1810, Sherbrooke returned to the UK due to illness.	
2	Stapleton Cotton	Major-General	26 April 1810	On 3 June, Cotton took command of the Cavalry Division.	
3	Sir Brent Spencer	Major-General	3 June 1810	Was also second-in-command, to Arthur Wellesley, 1st Duke of Wellington, of the British forces in the Iberian Peninsula during much of his tenure.	
4	Miles Nightingall	Major-General	3 May 1811	Was given command of the division during the Battle of Fuentes de Oñoro, as Sir Brent Spencer was assigned to also command a corps. Due to his second-in-command position, Spencer commanded all British forces in the Iberian Peninsula during a brief absence by Arthur Wellesley, 1st Duke of Wellington. As a result, Nightingall likely retained command of the division into June.	
Acting	Edward Stopford	Brigadier-General	June 1811		
3	Sir Brent Spencer	Major-General	June 1811	Was also second-in-command, to Arthur Wellesley, 1st Duke of Wellington, of the British forces in the Iberian Peninsula during much of his tenure.	
Acting	Henry Campbell	Major-General	25 July 1811		
5	Sir Thomas Graham	Lieutenant-General	9 August 1811	Was also second-in-command, to Arthur Wellesley, 1st Duke of Wellington, of the British forces in the Iberian Peninsula. Departed the peninsular for the UK, prior to the Battle of Salamanca, as a result of an eye infection.	
Acting	Henry Campbell	Major-General	6 July 1812		
6	Sir Edward Paget	Lieutenant-General	11 October 1812	Captured during the retreat following the Battle of Burgos on 17 November 1812.	
7	William Stewart	Lieutenant-General	17 November 1812		
8	Kenneth Howard	Major-General	25 March 1813	Howard maintained command of the division until the end of the Peninsular War.	
5	Sir Thomas Graham	Lieutenant-General	19 May 1813	After his return to the Iberian Peninsula, Graham resumed command of the division. However, Kenneth Howard maintained de facto command, as Graham was responsible for the left wing of the British force in the peninsula. On 8 October, Graham again left the peninsula due to illness.	
9	Sir John Hope	Lieutenant-General	8 October 1813	Kenneth Howard maintained de facto command of the division, as Hope was responsible for the left wing of the British force in the peninsula.	
8	Kenneth Howard	Major-General	14 April 1814	Sir John Hope was captured at the Battle of Bayonne and Howard was formally appointed to lead the 1st Division. At the end of the Peninsular War, the division was disbanded in France.	
10	George Cooke	Major-General	11 April 1815	On 11 April 1815, the division was reformed in Southern Netherlands. Cooke was severely wounded in action, during the Battle of Waterloo, and lost an arm.	
11	Sir John Byng	Major-General	18 June 1815	Byng took acting command of the division, during the Battle of Waterloo, following the injury to George Cooke. Later in the day, he also assumed control of I Corps when the Prince of Orange was also injured.	
12	Sir Peregrine Maitland	Major-General	18 June 1815	Took over acting command of the division when Sir John Byng assumed control of I Corps.	
8	Sir Kenneth Howard	Major-General	23 July 1815		
11	Sir John Byng	Major-General	22 August 1815		
12	Sir Peregrine Maitland	Major-General	2 October 1815		
13	Sir Galbraith Lowry Cole	Lieutenant-General	30 November 1815	On this date, the British Army in France was reorganised into an Army of Occupation, and Cole was given command of it. The division was disbanded in December 1818 when the British military withdrew from France.	
14	George Duke of Cambridge	Lieutenant-General	20 June 1854	The division was reformed in Varna, Ottoman Bulgaria, from British troops who had been assembled there during the opening stages of the Crimean War. The division then moved to the Crimean peninsular itself. On 25 November 1854, the Duke boarded a ship bound for the UK due to illness.	
15	Henry Lockyer	Brigadier-General	November 1854	Acting rank	
16	Sir Colin Campbell	Lieutenant-General	23 January 1855		
17	Henry Baron Rokeby	Lieutenant-General	30 July 1855		
Acting	Charles Ridley	Brigadier-General	August 1855		
17	Henry Baron Rokeby	Lieutenant-General	August 1855	In 1856, after the end of the Crimean War, the division was disbanded in Crimea.	
18	Henry Crealock	Major-General	March 1879	The division was reformed in the Colony of Natal for service in the Anglo-Zulu War. Following the Battle of Ulundi in July, the division was disbanded.	
19	Paul Baron Methuen	Lieutenant-General	9 October 1899	A new 1st Division was formed in England, and then moved to southern Africa to fight in the Second Boer War. Methuen maintained command through the end of 1900, when the division was disbanded while still in southern Africa.	
20	Arthur Paget	Major-General	30 September 1902	A new 1st Division was formed in the UK	
21	James Grierson	Major-General	6 October 1906		
22	Samuel Lomax	Lieutenant-General	7 August 1910	During Lomax's tenure, the division was mobilised for service in the First World War. Lomax was wounded in action on 31 October 1914, during the First Battle of Ypres	
Temporary	Herman Landon	Major-General	31 October 1914		
23	Sir David Henderson	Major-General	22 November 1914		
24	Richard Haking	Major-General	19 December 1914		
25	Arthur Holland	Major-General	11 September 1915		
26	Peter Strickland	Major-General	12 June 1916	The First World War ended in November 1918, and the division entered Germany one month later. In March 1919, elements of the division were used to create the 'Western Division' of the British Army of the Rhine, while the rest of the division was demobilised and returned to England, where it was reformed.	
27	Sir Guy Bainbridge	Major-General	4 June 1919	The division was reformed in England on this date. During Bainbridge's tenure, the division dispatched troops to reinforce British forces fighting in the Irish War of Independence and also sent troops to reinforce the British presence during the Occupation of Constantinople.	
28	Sir Archibald Montgomery-Massingberd	Major-General	4 June 1923		
29	Sir Cecil Romer	Major-General	1 April 1926		
30	Sir John Duncan	Major-General	14 March 1928		
31	Felix Ready	Major-General	15 December 1928		
32	Wentworth Harman	Major-General	9 November 1930		
33	John Kennedy	Major-General	21 April 1934	During Kennedy's tenure, the division dispatched troops to the Territory of the Saar Basin to oversee the 1935 Saar status referendum.	
34	Clement Armitage	Major-General	18 February 1936	In 1936, following the start of the Arab revolt, the entire division was dispatched to Palestine for several months. The majority of troops had returned to the UK by the end of the year, with the last detachments returning in 1937.	
35	Harold Alexander	Major-General	14 February 1938	During Alexander's tenure, the division was mobilised for service in the Second World War, dispatched to France, and fought in the Battle of France	
Acting	Merton Beckwith-Smith	Brigadier	31 May 1940		
35	Harold Alexander	Major-General	3 June 1940	The division was evacuated from France, during June 1940, and returned to England.	
Acting	Merton Beckwith-Smith	Brigadier	9 June 1940		
36	Kenneth Anderson	Major-General	13 June 1940		
37	Edwin Morris	Major-General	19 May 1941		
38	Walter Clutterbuck	Major-General	18 November 1941	During Clutterbuck's tenure, the division was dispatched to Africa to fight in the Tunisian campaign of the Second World War.	
39	Ronald Penney	Major-General	14 October 1943	During Penney's tenure, the division was dispatched to fight in the Italian campaigns of the Second World War.	
Temporary	Gerald Templer	Major-General	18 February 1944	Templer was the commanding officer of the 56th (London) Infantry Division at this time, when he was appointed to temporary command of the 1st Division.	
39	Ronald Penney	Major-General	23 February 1944		
Temporary	John Hawkesworth	Major-General	4 May 1944		
Acting	Charles Loewen	Brigadier	24 May 1944		
39	Ronald Penney	Major-General	14 June 1944		
40	Charles Loewen	Major-General	24 July 1944	In February 1945, the division left Italy and moved to Palestine. It was still in Palestine when the Second World War ended.	
41	Richard Gale	Major-General	1946		
42	Horatius Murray	Major-General	1947	During Murray's tenure, the division moved from Palestine to Tripoli, Libya.	
43	Francis Matthews	Major-General	December 1950	In 1951, the division moved from Tripoli, Libya to Egypt, to maintain a British military presence at the Suez Canal.	
44	Thomas Brodie	Major-General	8 September 1952		
45	Rodney Moore	Major-General	20 July 1955	In the late 1955, the division moved from the Middle East to the UK. On 16 November 1955, Moore was transferred to command the 10th Armoured Division. No new appointment was made to the 1st Infantry Division for the duration of 1955.	
46	Guy Gregson	Major-General	2 January 1956		
47	Reginald Hobbs	Major-General	1 April 1959	By April 1959, the division was known simply as the 1st Division. It was disbanded in England on 30 June 1960, as there was other need for the divisional headquarters facilities there.	
48	Alan Jolly	Major-General	1 July 1960	The division was reformed in Germany, when the 5th Division was redesignated, and became part of the British Army of the Rhine.	
49	Thomas Pearson	Major-General	4 November 1961		
50	Miles Fitzalan-Howard	Major-General	5 November 1963		
51	Richard Ward	Major-General	5 November 1965		
52	Allan Taylor	Major-General	1 January 1968		
53	Jack Harman	Major-General	6 January 1970		
54	Edwin Bramall	Major-General	6 January 1972		
55	John Stanier	Major-General	3 November 1973		
56	David Alexander-Sinclair	Major-General	4 November 1975		
57	Richard Lawson	Major-General	7 November 1977	In April 1978, the 1st Division was reorganised as the 1st Armoured Division.	
58	Geoffrey Howlett	Major-General	3 November 1979		
59	Brian Kenny	Major-General	5 January 1982		
60	David Thorne	Major-General	17 November 1983		
61	Anthony Mullens	Major-General	February 1986		
62	Richard Swinburn	Major-General	20 July 1987		
63	Roger Wheeler	Major-General	4 August 1989		
64	Rupert Smith	Major-General	29 October 1990	During Smith's tenure, the division was deployed to the Middle East and fought in the Gulf War. The division returned to Germany following the conclusion of hostilities.	
65	Iain Mackay-Dick	Major-General	3 August 1992	As a result of the end of the Cold War and the British government's Options for Change policy, the division was disbanded on 31 December 1992.	
66	Anthony Denison-Smith	Major-General	July 1993	In July 1993, the division was reformed in Germany as the 1st (United Kingdom) Armoured Division, when the 4th Armoured Division was redesignated.	
67	Roddy Cordy-Simpson	Major-General	21 February 1994		
68	John Kiszely	Major-General	3 June 1996		
69	Redmond Watt	Major General	17 August 1998	Hyphens had been dropped from rank titles by the time Watt was appointed to command the division.	
70	Robin Brims	Major General	22 November 2000	During Brim's tenure, the division took part in the 2003 invasion of Iraq.	
71	Peter Wall	Major General	12 May 2003		
72	John Cooper	Major General	25 January 2005		
73	Graham Binns	Major General	1 October 2006		
74	Adrian Bradshaw	Major General	25 March 2009		
75	James Bashall	Major General	1 April 2011		
76	James Chiswell	Major General	1 October 2012	During 2014, the division was redesignated the 1st (United Kingdom) Division.	
77	Giles Hill	Major General	7 April 2015	In June 2015, the division relocated from Germany to the UK.	
78	Ralph Wooddisse	Major General	15 May 2017		
79	Colin Weir	Major General	19 November 2018		
80	Charles Collins	Major General	25 September 2020		
Acting	Jean Laurentin	Brigadier General	17 June 2022	Laurentin was a French Army officer who was serving as the division's deputy general commanding officer.	
81	Tom Bateman	Major General	16 September 2022		
82	Daniel Reeve	Major General	1 March 2024		
83	Robert Hedderwick	Major General	1 August 2025	Incumbent.	
