= Metastasis Research Society =

International professional society dedicated to metastasis research and treatment

- Formation: 1984; 42 years ago
- Type: Professional association
- Purpose: "to de-throne metastasis as a disease that steals lives by obtaining research results that translate to patients having an optimal quality of life while managing metastasis as a chronic condition, with the ultimate goal of achieving a cure."
- Headquarters: Tampa, Florida, U.S.
- Official language: English
- President: Alana Welm
- Key people: Neta Erez, President Elect

The Metastasis Research Society (MRS) is an international professional society dedicated to metastasis research and treatment. Headquartered in Tampa, Florida, the MRS was formed in 1974 as the E.O.R.T.C. Metastasis Club by Bavarian clinical pharmacologist Kurt Hellmann and Director of the Mario Negri Institute for Pharmacological Research Silvio Garattini. It took its current name in the mid-1980s, with its first international meeting as a formal society in 1984 in London.

The MRS official journal is Clinical & Experimental Metastasis, which has an impact factor of 6.081 in 2018, launched in 1982 to critically review and discuss challenges around cancer studies and therapeutic research. The journal covers metastasis research in multiple disciplines that focus on preventing and treating metastasis formation.

The society sponsors a biennial International Metastasis Research Congress where it presents its highest award, the Paget-Ewing Award for excellent research in cancer metastasis. Named for Stephen Paget and James Ewing, the first awards were bestowed on Dale Rex Cowan and Irwing Zeidman for their pioneering work in the field at the 2nd International Metastasis Congress in Heidelberg in 1988, an event attended by 400 scientists from 22 countries. More recent winners include Isaiah Fidler (2000), Lance Liotta (2002), David Cheresh (2010), Joan Massagué (2012), Richard Hynes (2018), Ashani Weeraratna (2022), and David Lyden (2024).
