= Kurt Hellmann =

Kurt Hellmann (12 May 1922 – 2 April 2013) was a Bavarian clinical pharmacologist best known for his discovery of the biologic activity of two important drugs: Razoxane and Dexrazoxane.

== Career ==
From 1962 until 1987, Hellmann served the Imperial Cancer Research Fund London as founding director of its Department of Cancer Chemotherapy. In 1972, Hellmann published the results of his breakthrough work with DL-razoxane (ICRF-159), the first fully antimetastatic compound discovered for the treatment of cancer. He was the co-founder and long-term editor (1974-1991) of the journal Cancer Treatment Reviews. In 1974, he co-created with Silvio Garattini, the Director of the Mario Negri Institute for Pharmacological Research, Milan, an international body of medical experts called the E.O.R.T.C. Metastasis Club, which evolved in the 1980s into the Metastasis Research Society. He co-edited the organization's official journal, Clinical &Experimental Metastasis from 1984 to 1998. In 1977, he released with co-authors Stephen Carter and Marie Bakowski the oncology standard reference Chemotherapy of Cancer. In 1996, he predicted the importance of preventing pharmacological anthracycline cardiotoxicity in quality of life of cancer survivors.

== Personal life and education ==
A native of Nürnberg, Bavaria, Hellmann emigrated to England as a child in 1933. After World War II service as an engineer, he turned his studies to chemistry at Oxford, receiving a Pharmacology Doctor of Philosophy degree in 1953, a Bachelor of Medicine, Bachelor of Surgery in 1958, and a Doctor of Medicine degree in 1964. During his studies, in 1959, he met his future wife, Jane, wedding her in 1961. He had been a resident of East Sussex, UK, for over 30 years at the time of his death at the age of 90 in 2013. His wife survived him.
