= Bernard Howlett =

English cricketer and British Army officer (1898–1943)

Brigadier Bernard Howlett DSO*
- Born: 18 December 1898; Stoke Newington, London, England
- Died: 29 November 1943 (aged 44); Santa Maria Imbaro, Abruzzo, Italy
- Burial place: Sangro River War Cemetery, Italy
- Relatives: Sir Geoffrey Howlett (son)
- Military career
- Allegiance: United Kingdom
- Branch: British Army
- Service years: 1918–1943
- Rank: Brigadier
- Nickname: "Swifty"
- Service number: 13838
- Unit: Queen's Own Royal West Kent Regiment
- Commands: 36th Infantry Brigade (1942–1943); 6th Battalion, Queen's Own Royal West Kent Regiment (1940–1941)
- Conflicts: First World War: Western Front; Hundred Days Offensive; Second Battle of the Somme; Battle of Cambrai; Second World War
- Awards: Distinguished Service Order & Bar; Mentioned in Despatches (2)

Brigadier Bernard Howlett, DSO & Bar (18 December 1898 – 29 November 1943), known as Swifty Howlett, was a professional soldier in the British Army who was killed in action in Italy in 1943. He served as a young officer at the end of the First World War and commanded the 6th Battalion, Queen's Own Royal West Kent Regiment from 1940 to 1941.

During the Second World War, Howlett fought in France, North Africa and Italy, commanding the 36th Infantry Brigade from December 1942 until his death. Howlett also played cricket as an amateur for Kent County Cricket Club in 1922 and 1928 and for a range of other first-class cricket teams.

== Early life ==
Howlett was born in Stoke Newington in London in 1898. His father, Reverend Thomas Edwin Howlett, was the vicar of St Michael & All Saints in Stoke Newington, and his mother was Gertrude Howlett. His father died when Howlett was five years old.

Howlett was educated at St Edmund's School in Canterbury, Kent from 1908. He played football, hockey and cricket for the school and was a house captain and a sergeant in the school OTC. On leaving school he entered the Royal Military College, Sandhurst in December 1916.

== Military career ==
Howlett was at Sandhurst during the First World War on one of the shorter, war-time courses for young officers. He was commissioned as a second lieutenant in April 1918 into the Queen's Own Royal West Kent Regiment (RWK) and served in the Special Reserve in England throughout the summer of 1918. In August he was posted to the Western Front and served with the 7th Battalion of the RWK in the Second Battle of the Somme, seeing action almost immediately at Sailly-Saillisel. During the following months he fought in the more mobile advances around Ronssoy, Le Cateau and Cambrai until the Armistice in November.

After the end of the war, Howlett fell ill and underwent treatment in England before serving with the 1st Battalion RWK. Promoted to lieutenant in October 1919, he remained in the army during the interwar period, and was promoted further to captain. He was stationed at Maidstone at the RWK depot before being posted to India in the mid-1920s. From 1930 he spent four years serving as adjutant of the 4th Battalion RWK, a Territorial Army (TA) unit based at Tonbridge, between December 1930 and December 1934.

Howlett then spent time as a staff officer with the 49th (West Riding) Infantry Division, another TA formation, from April 1936 to March 1939 and was promoted to major in 1938. On leaving the divisional staff he was promoted to brigade major of the TA 132nd Infantry Brigade and, soon after the outbreak of the Second World War, served with the brigade in France with the 44th (Home Counties) Infantry Division in the British Expeditionary Force (BEF) before being withdrawn from Dunkirk when the BEF was evacuated. He was Mentioned in Despatches in December 1940.

In October 1940 Howlett was promoted to temporary lieutenant colonel and assumed command of the 6th Battalion, RWK, then serving as part of the 36th Infantry Brigade. The brigade was trained in amphibious warfare in Scotland and took part in the amphibious landings at Algiers in November 1942 before advancing across North Africa to Tunis. Howlett took command of the 36th Brigade as acting brigadier during December 1942 and, temporarily, the 139th Brigade in March 1943. He led the brigade in the attack on Longstop Hill and was awarded the Distinguished Service Order (DSO) for his brigade's success in North Africa.

Howlett fought in the invasion of Sicily in July 1943 and was awarded a Bar to his DSO for the brigade's part in the Battle of Centuripe in August. The brigade then took part in the invasion of Italy in September. Howlett was promoted to lieutenant colonel on 24 November 1943, still acting as brigadier. 36th Brigade was engaged with the enemy along the River Sangro at the time and Howlett was killed by German artillery fire on 29 November at Santa Maria Imbaro. He had gone forward on horseback to visit his forward troops and was caught in the artillery fire. He was 44 and had been due to be promoted to major general to command a division in the Normandy landings. Howlett is buried in the Sangro River War Cemetery. He was posthumously Mentioned in Despatches.

== Cricket career ==
Bernard Howlett
Cricket information
- Batting: Right-handed
- Bowling: Right-arm fast

Career statistics
Competition	First-class
Matches	42
Runs scored	319
Batting average	9.38
100s/50s	0/1
Top score	58
Balls bowled	3,156
Wickets	108
Bowling average	29.22
5 wickets in innings	3
10 wickets in match	0
Best bowling	6/35
Catches/stumpings	23/–
- Source: ESPNcricinfo, 16 November 2017

Howlett played cricket at school and for Sandhurst as a right-arm fast bowler. He played in a number of matches for Royal West Kent in 1918 whilst serving in England. He was described as bowling a "very fast ball" and the regimental magazine of the RWK remarked that he had needed to reduce his pace in regimental matches "as we are out to kill Huns and not our opposing team".

Whilst stationed at Maidstone in 1919, Howlett played for The Mote as well as the RWK, bowling 204 overs for the RWK 1st Battalion in 1919, taking 64 wickets at a bowling average of 10.28 runs per wicket – easily the best figures for his team. He played for Kent County Cricket Club, making six first-class appearances in 1922 and 20 in 1928 as well as playing four times for the Second XI in 1923. He made his first-class debut for Kent in May 1922 against Worcestershire at Gravesend, going on to play in a total of 42 first-class matches, 26 of which were for Kent.

Howlett played for a variety of teams in India, most frequently for the Europeans cricket team for whom he appeared eight times in competitions such as Bombay Quadrangular Tournament and in Madras Presidency Matches. He played some matches for the Army team between 1928 and 1931 and made his last first-class appearance for the Army team in July 1931 against the RAF team at The Oval. He also appeared for Marylebone Cricket Club (MCC) in 1931 and was still playing for the Royal West Kents in 1934. Primarily a bowler, he took a total of 108 wickets in first-class matches. His highest score batting was 58 runs, the only half-century of his career.

== Family ==
Howlett married Helen Whitby in 1929 at Holy Trinity Church, Bangalore. The couple had one son, General Sir Geoffrey Howlett, and one daughter.

== Bibliography ==
- Carlaw, Derek (2020). Kent County Cricketers, A to Z: Part Two (1919–1939) (PDF). Cardiff: ACS.
