= Jim Morris (Royal Marines officer) =

Royal Marines major general

Major General Jim Morris CB DSO
- Military career
- Allegiance: United Kingdom
- Branch: Royal Marines
- Service years: 1987–2024
- Rank: Major General
- Commands: 45 Commando; 3 Commando Brigade; Standing Joint Force Headquarters
- Conflicts: War in Afghanistan
- Awards: Companion of the Order of the Bath; Companion of the Distinguished Service Order

Major General James Andrew John Morris CB DSO is a retired senior Royal Marines officer.

== Military career ==
Morris was commissioned into the Royal Marines on 1 September 1987. He became commanding officer of 45 Commando in 2007 and in that role was deployed to Afghanistan in 2008. He went on to be commander of 3 Commando Brigade in 2015, Deputy Chief of Staff, Joint Operations at Permanent Joint Headquarters in April 2019 and General Officer Commanding the UK Standing Joint Force Headquarters in July 2021.

He was appointed a Companion of the Distinguished Service Order for services in Afghanistan between October 2008 and March 2009 and a Companion of the Order of the Bath in the 2023 New Year Honours.

After retiring from the Royal Marines, Morris became Director of Events for World Sailing in April 2024.

Military offices
Preceded by Rupert Jones	GOC Standing Joint Force Headquarters; 2021–2024	Succeeded by Tom Bateman
