= Rupert Jones (British Army officer) =

British Army officer

Major General Rupert Jones CBE
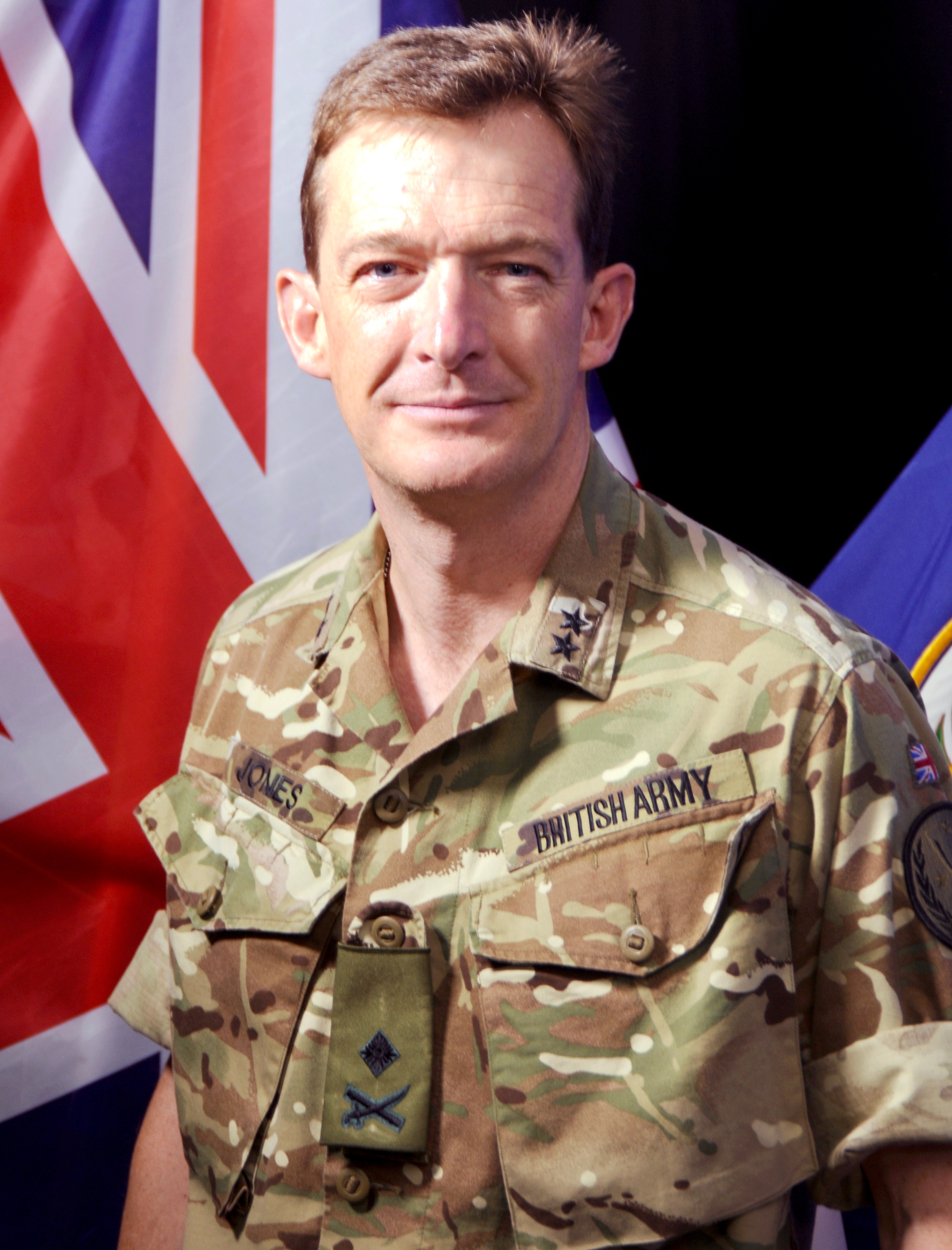
- Jones in August 2016
- Born: 29 April 1969 (age 57); Germany
- Relatives: H. Jones (father)
- Military career
- Allegiance: United Kingdom
- Branch: British Army
- Service years: 1987–2021
- Rank: Major General
- Unit: The Rifles
- Commands: Standing Joint Force (2018–2021); 1st Armoured Infantry Brigade (2012–2014); 4th Battalion, The Rifles (2008–2010)
- Conflicts: Bosnian War; Iraq War; War in Afghanistan; The Troubles; Operation Inherent Resolve
- Awards: Commander of the Order of the British Empire; Officer of the Legion of Merit (United States)

Major General Rupert Timothy Herbert Jones CBE (born 29 April 1969) is a retired senior British Army officer, who served as the Standing Joint Force Commander from November 2018 to July 2021.

== Early life ==
Jones was born in Germany, the youngest son of H. Jones, who was posthumously awarded the Victoria Cross for his actions as commanding officer of the 2nd Battalion, Parachute Regiment during the Battle of Goose Green in the Falklands War of 1982. Rupert Jones attended St. Peter's Preparatory School in Seaford, Sussex and Sherborne School. He later studied history at the University of Reading.

== Military career ==
Jones joined the British Army as an undergraduate cadet in 1987 and was commissioned into the Devonshire and Dorset Regiment, his father's former regiment. He served his early career in Germany, Northern Ireland and Bosnia, and was appointed a Member of the Order of the British Empire in the 2001 Birthday Honours. Following company command, he served as Chief of Staff 12th Mechanized Brigade, deploying to Iraq in 2005. He served as commanding officer of 4th Battalion, The Rifles from 2008 to 2010, during which the battalion deployed to Afghanistan as part of Operation Herrick. Jones was said to be "immensely frustrated" that his battalion was split up among other battle groups and he was left to command from the rear at Camp Bastion. He was the leading candidate to command the Welsh Guards battle group after Lieutenant Colonel Rupert Thorneloe was killed in action but Brigade commander Brigadier Tim Radford opted for SAS veteran Charlie Antelme instead.

In February 2010, he launched the Care for Casualties appeal on behalf of the Rifles.

During his career Jones has served in the Ministry of Defence (MOD) on numerous occasions, including as an SO3 in the Directorate of Military Operations with responsibility for Military Aid to the Civil Authorities and Counter Terrorism, as military assistant to the MOD's director of operations, as the Armed Forces representative advising Lord Levene's steering group during Defence Reform, and for a short period as the chief of the General Staff's Colonel Army Strategy.

Jones was promoted to colonel, with seniority, from July 2011. He completed the Higher Command and Staff Course the following year and then took command of 1st Armoured Infantry Brigade, where he commanded Task Force Helmand from April to October 2013. While in Afghanistan, he was promoted to brigadier. In March 2014, he was appointed Commander of the Order of the British Empire, following service to the War in Afghanistan. From 2014 to 2016, he served as the assistant chief of staff operations and the chief of staff to the standing joint commander (UK) in the Army HQ.

=== Operation Inherent Resolve ===
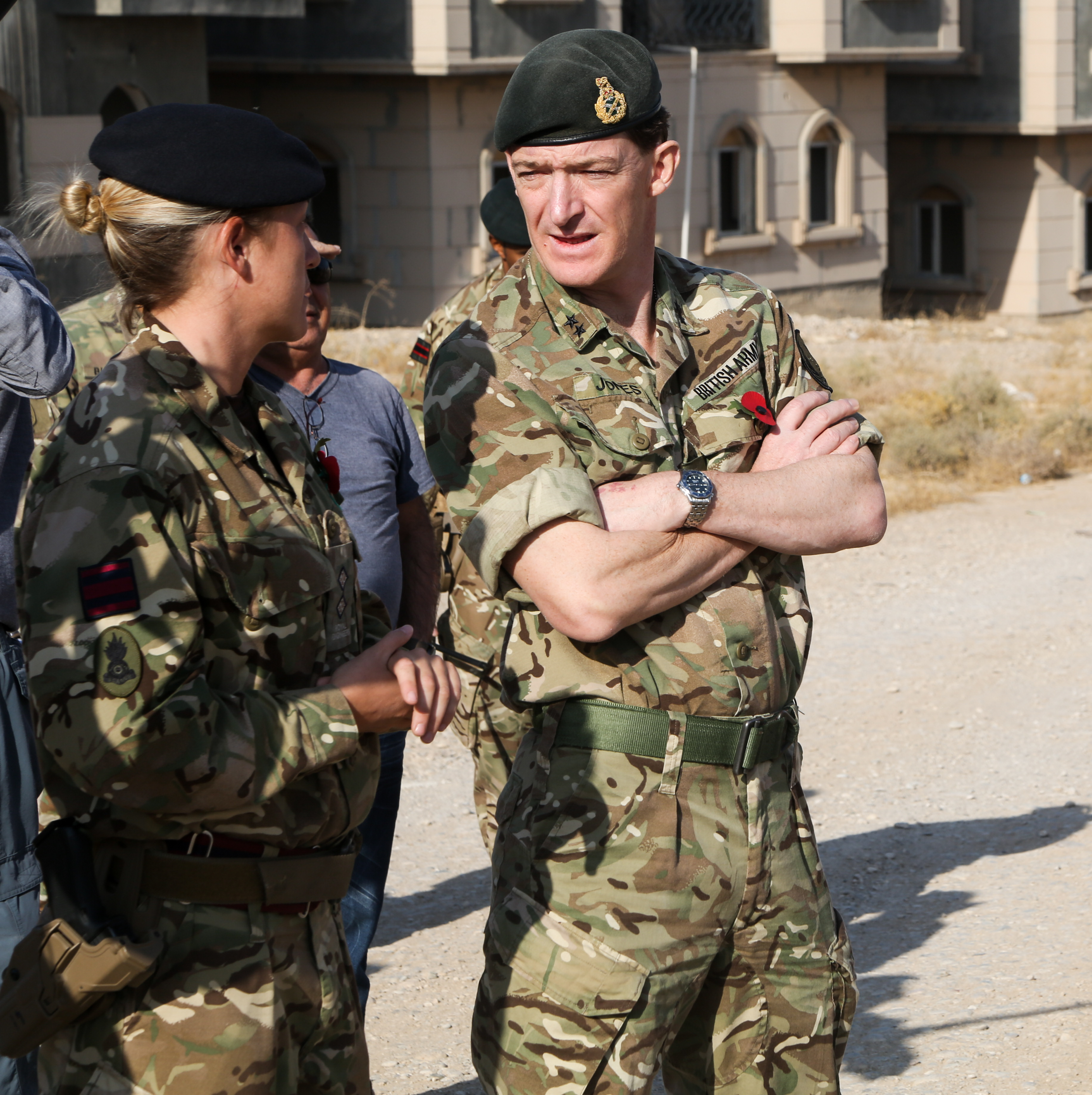
Jones speaks with a British explosive ordnance disposal trainer during a visit near Erbil, Iraq, November 2016.

In April 2016 Jones was promoted to major general, and was appointed the deputy commander of Combined Joint Task Force – Operation Inherent Resolve (CJTF-OIR) later that year. In November 2016, he hailed the "extraordinary amount of progress" made by the international coalition, as result of their daily strikes against Da'esh.

In February 2017, during a briefing in London, Jones stated: "We as an international coalition have always been very clear: if you are going to take up arms on behalf of Da'esh, and you are going to kill innocent civilians, we will find you and we will kill you. That does not matter whether they are from London, or Paris, or from Baghdad. We will target you under the laws of armed conflict". He added that Da'esh fighters were being killed "at a rate they simply can't sustain". Commenting on Abu Bakr al-Baghdadi, he said: "If we in the international coalition knew where he was, for certain then he wouldn't stay alive for very long. I think if he was dead then there probably would have been an announcement to say he's dead. Most of Baghdadi's lieutenants are dead. He is now frankly in hiding. His narrative of some kind of caliphate, well that's exposed as a lie when you're in hiding yourself."

In August 2017, Jones echoed comments made by Iraqi Prime Minister Haider al-Abadi in a Pentagon press conference, by giving Da'esh fighters the choice to "surrender or die". He went on to say that Da'esh "are losing on all fronts. They are losing on the battlefield, they are losing financially, the flow of foreign fighters has slowed to a trickle. Their narrative has been significantly discredited".

Jones handed over to Major General Felix Gedney in late August 2017.

=== Senior staff and command ===
In January 2018, Jones was appointed Assistant Chief of the General Staff in succession to Major General Nick Welch. The role represents the chief of the General Staff in Whitehall. Jones was appointed an Officer of the Legion of Merit by the United States in May 2018 for his service in Iraq and Syria. On 3 September 2018, his title was renamed as Director Engagement and Communications (D E&C), acting as the Army's communications director with responsibility for all internal and external engagement.

Jones was appointed Standing Joint Force Commander in November 2018. In August 2020 he faced allegations in the media of breaking COVID-19 lockdown to conduct an affair with a married woman, but was reportedly cleared of wrongdoing by the military.

Military offices
Preceded by Nick Welch	Assistant Chief of the General Staff; January – September 2018	Succeeded by James Swift
Preceded by Stuart Skeates	GOC Standing Joint Force Headquarters; 2018–2021	Succeeded by Jim Morris
