= Tom Bateman (British Army officer) =

British army general

Lieutenant General Tom Bateman CBE
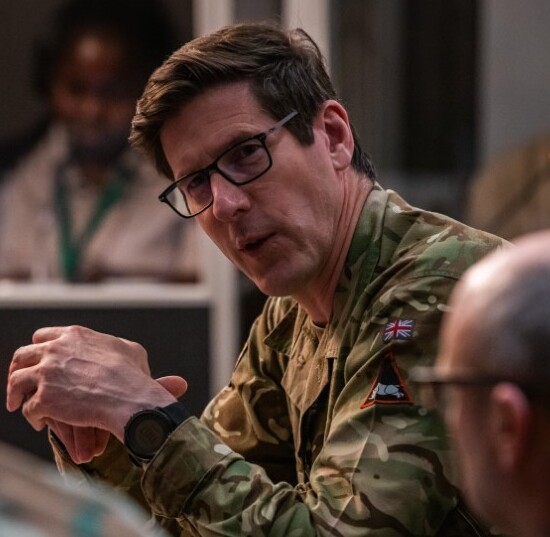
- Major General Bateman in 2023
- Military career
- Allegiance: United Kingdom
- Branch: British Army
- Service years: 1990–present
- Rank: Lieutenant General
- Commands: 1st (United Kingdom) Division; 11 Infantry Brigade and Headquarters South East
- Conflicts: War in Afghanistan
- Awards: Commander of the Order of the British Empire

Lieutenant General Thomas Julian Bateman, CBE is a senior British Army officer who served as Commander of the UK Standing Joint Force Headquarters from April 2024 to June 2026 and is currently Commander Multinational Force Ukraine since July 2026.

== Military career ==
Bateman was commissioned in the Royal Scots Dragoon Guards on 9 September 1990. He became commander of 11 Infantry Brigade and Headquarters South East in August 2018, Assistant Chief of Staff, Operations at Permanent Joint Headquarters in November 2020, and General Officer Commanding 1st (United Kingdom) Division in September 2022. He went on to be Commander of the UK Standing Joint Force Headquarters in April 2024, serving until summer 2026.

In July 2026 he was promoted to lieutenant general, and appointed in command of the multinational headquarters preparing to send forces into Ukraine once fighting stops, located in Paris.

Bateman was appointed a Member of the Order of the British Empire in the 2011 New Year Honours, and was advanced to Commander of the Order of the British Empire for services in the field on 15 September 2017.

In autumn 2025 Bateman was posted, along with other British service personnel, to the Civil-Military Coordination Center, Kiryat Gat, Israel.

Military offices
Preceded by Jean Laurentin	GOC 1st (United Kingdom) Division; 2022–2024	Succeeded by Daniel Reeve
Preceded by Jim Morris	GOC Standing Joint Force Headquarters; 2024 – 2026	Succeeded by TBA
Preceded by Jean Pierre Fagué	Commander Multinational Force Ukraine; 2026 – Present	Incumbent
