= Care for Casualties =

UK charity for injured soldiers

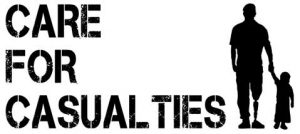
- Abbreviation: C4C
- Formation: 2009
- Type: Charity
- Purpose: Supporting wounded servicemen and women from The Rifles
- Region served: United Kingdom
- Official language: English
- Affiliations: The Rifles
- Website: http://theriflesnetwork.co.uk/index.php/welfare/care-for-casualties/

Care for Casualties (C4C) is a British charity launched in early 2009 to raise funds in order to assist British servicemen and women from The Rifles who have been wounded or injured during service in Iraq or Afghanistan, as well as helping their families.

== History ==
C4C was launched in early 2009, by Major General Rupert Jones, who was then commanding officer of 4th Battalion The Rifles, Karen Charman-Allen, mother of Rifleman Philip Allen, who was killed in November 2009 as part of Operation Herrick with 2nd Battalion The Rifles, and Regimental Secretary Lt Col John Poole-Warren. Since the formation of The Rifles in 2007, they have seen continued commitment to both Afghanistan and Iraq, with over 60 Riflemen killed, and over 300 injured in that time. With the increase in post traumatic stress disorder among soldiers, the appeal was launched to combat this.
