= Centro Studi GISED =

- Formation: 2002
- Founder: Luigi Naldi
- Type: non-profit
- Legal status: Association
- Purpose: Clinical and epidemiological research, education and assistance in dermatology
- Headquarters: Bergamo (Italy)
- President: Vincenzo Bettoli
- Website: https://www.centrostudigised.it/en/

Centro Studi GISED is an Italian research association with legal personality registered with no. 2096/2004 at the R.E.A. Register in Bergamo (Italy). It is a non-profit association established in 2002, and it develops research and educational programs with the aim of improving scientific knowledge, assistance and transparent and specific information to the public with regard to the main dermatological diseases.

== History ==
The Italian Group for Epidemiological Research in Dermatology (GISED) was set up within the Italian Society of Dermatology and Venereology (formerly SIDEV, now SIDEMAST) in 1986 as a working group focusing on epidemiological research. It was a joint initiative of Prof. Tullio Cainelli, director of the Department of Dermatology, University of Milan at Ospedali Riuniti of Bergamo, and Prof. Alfredo Rebora, director of the Department of Dermatology, University of Genoa. In the Scientific Committee were involved. Prof. Giuseppe Zina, director of the Department of Dermatology, University of Turin, and Dr. Gianni Tognoni of the Mario Negri Institute for Pharmacological Research. Dr. Luigi Naldi, at that time a young investigator at the Laboratory of Clinical Pharmacology of the Mario Negri Institute in Milan, was the person in charge of the organization of the coordinating centre. The headquarters of the coordinating centre had been located for several years, until March 2009, at the Dermatology Unit of Ospedali Riuniti of Bergamo.

== The developments ==
Since its founding in 1986, GISED grew progressively. Its activities ranged over the years from descriptive epidemiology to etiological research, randomized clinical trials, registers, and systematic reviews. A total of 50 academic and clinical centres contributed to these projects. Over the years, formal courses on research methodology and on Evidence Based Medicine were also organized. Overall, GISED proved to be not only an effective collaborative network but also a valuable tool for education and dissemination of an epidemiological and methodological culture. Over the years, several contacts have been established at the international level (among the others, the EuroSCAR and RegiSCAR networks, the European Dermato-Epidemiology Network (EDEN), the Cochrane Collaboration).

== Centro Studi GISED and the GISED network ==
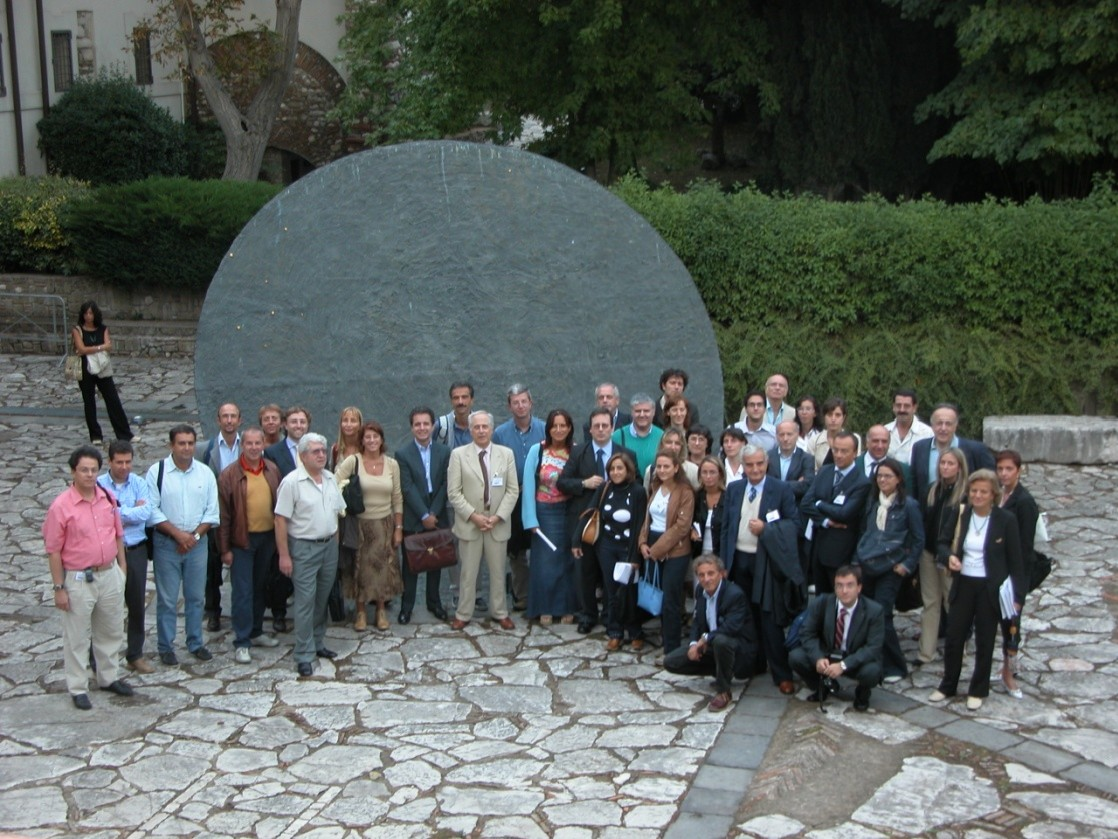
The GISED group at the XIX annual meeting in Benevento

A limiting factor for further possible development of GISED activities was the lack of a formal structure and legal basis for the coordinating centre. For this reason, in 2002, the Centro Studi GISED association was founded. Dr. Luigi Naldi was elected president, assisted by a scientific Board composed by the most active members of the group. In 2003, Centro Studi GISED got formal recognition as a non-profit association by the Lombardy Region and was registered in the Register of Companies (REA) with the n. 2096. Again in 2003, an agreement with the Inter-University Centre Thomas Chalmers at the University of Milan was signed and Centro Studi GISED became a component of the Italian Cochrane Network.

Besides coordinating the research projects of the GISED network, Centro Studi GISED began to develop its own projects with particular attention to clinical research, combination of basic research and clinical research (translational research), imaging and information techniques in dermatology. In 2008, GISED ceased to be a working group of SIDEMAST and was maintained as an informal group of people interested in working in multi-centre studies, the "GISED network". The headquarters of the Association were at Ospedali Riuniti of Bergamo until March 2009, when they moved to the Matteo Rota Hospital, collaborating with the newly formed Research Foundation Ospedale Maggiore of Bergamo (FROM). From 2009 to 2011 another office, primarily dedicated to the development of innovative imaging systems in dermatology, was activated at the Kilometro Rosso Science and Technology Park in Stezzano. In March 2018, Centro Studi GISED moved its headquarters to via Clara Maffei 4 in Bergamo, at the offices made available by the Health Protection Agency (ATS) of Bergamo.
