= Richard Lawson (British Army officer) =

British Army general (1927–2023)

General Sir Richard Lawson KCB DSO OBE
- Born: 24 November 1927; Hertfordshire, England
- Died: 9 May 2023 (aged 95)
- Military career
- Allegiance: United Kingdom
- Branch: British Army
- Service years: 1948–1986
- Rank: General
- Service number: 393195
- Unit: Royal Tank Regiment
- Commands: Allied Forces Northern Europe; Northern Ireland; 1st Armoured Division; 20th Armoured Brigade
- Conflicts: United Nations Operation in the Congo; Aden Emergency; Operation Banner
- Awards: Knight Commander of the Order of the Bath; Distinguished Service Order; Officer of the Order of the British Empire; Knight Commander of the Order of St. Sylvester (Holy See); Officer of the Order of the Crown (Belgium)

General Sir Richard George Lawson (24 November 1927 – 9 May 2023) was a British Army officer. He was General Officer Commanding in Northern Ireland during the Troubles from 1979 to 1982 and later served as Commander-in-Chief of Allied Forces Northern Europe from 1982 to 1986.

== Early career ==
Lawson was commissioned into the Royal Tank Regiment as a second lieutenant on 15 July 1948, after graduating from the Royal Military Academy Sandhurst, and promoted to lieutenant on 15 July 1950.

== Congo and Yemen ==
Lawson was promoted to major on 16 July 1961. In December 1961, he volunteered for service with the United Nations peacekeeping force in the Republic of the Congo. At the time he was attached to the Nigerian Army, on secondment from the 1st Royal Tank Regiment. He served in South Kasai and then Katanga, where he became briefly famous for his part in the rescue of several groups of missionaries, and was nicknamed "Dick the Lionheart" by the Daily Express.

In 1963 Lawson published a book recounting his time in the Congo, entitled Strange Soldiering: Major Lawson's own dramatic story of his experiences with the third Nigerian brigade. For his actions he was appointed a Companion of the Distinguished Service Order (DSO) on 30 March 1962, and the Nigerian officer, Major Conrad Nwawo, 1st Battalion, The Queen's Own Nigeria Regiment, who accompanied Lawson was awarded the Military Cross, Lawson was also appointed an Officer of the Order of the Crown of Belgium, and a Knight Commander of the Papal Order of St. Sylvester.

From March to November 1967, Lawson undertook another secondment in a British colony on the verge of independence, the Federation of South Arabia (now part of Yemen), acting as GSO1 to the British forces stationed there, training local officers in staff duties, and overseeing the transition to local forces controlling security in Aden; for this he was appointed an Officer of the Order of the British Empire (OBE) on 8 June 1968, in the Queen's Birthday Honours. During this period he was promoted to lieutenant-colonel on 30 June 1967. He was promoted to colonel on 6 July 1971 and brigadier on 31 December 1971.

== Promotion to general officer ==
From 1972 to 1973, he commanded 20th Armoured Brigade. On 7 November 1977 he took command of 1st Armoured Division with the acting rank of major general, and received substantive promotion on 30 June 1978 (with seniority from 1 April 1976). On 3 November 1979, he ceased to command 1st Division.

Lawson succeeded Timothy Creasey as GOC Northern Ireland on 1 December 1979, and was promoted to lieutenant-general after his appointment. He was himself succeeded by Robert Richardson on 1 June 1982. In the 1980 New Year Honours he was appointed a Knight Commander of the Order of the Bath (KCB), and on 1 January 1980 he was appointed Colonel Commandant of the Royal Tank Regiment, a post he held until 1 June 1982.

Lawson was appointed Commander-in-Chief of Allied Forces Northern Europe, a NATO post, on 15 November 1982, replacing Anthony Farrar-Hockley, and was promoted to general on his appointment. He was succeeded by Geoffrey Howlett on 10 February 1986. He retired from the army on 28 May 1986.

== Death ==
Lawson died on 9 May 2023, at the age of 95.

Military offices
Preceded by David Alexander-Sinclair	General Officer Commanding 1st Armoured Division; 1977–1979	Succeeded by Geoffrey Howlett
Preceded by Timothy Creasey	General Officer Commanding the British Army in Northern Ireland; 1979–1982	Succeeded by Robert Richardson
Preceded by Sir Anthony Farrar-Hockley	Commander-in-Chief of Allied Forces Northern Europe; 1982–1986	Succeeded by Sir Geoffrey Howlett
