= Stuart Skeates =

British Army officer (born 1966)

Lieutenant General Stuart Skeates CB CBE
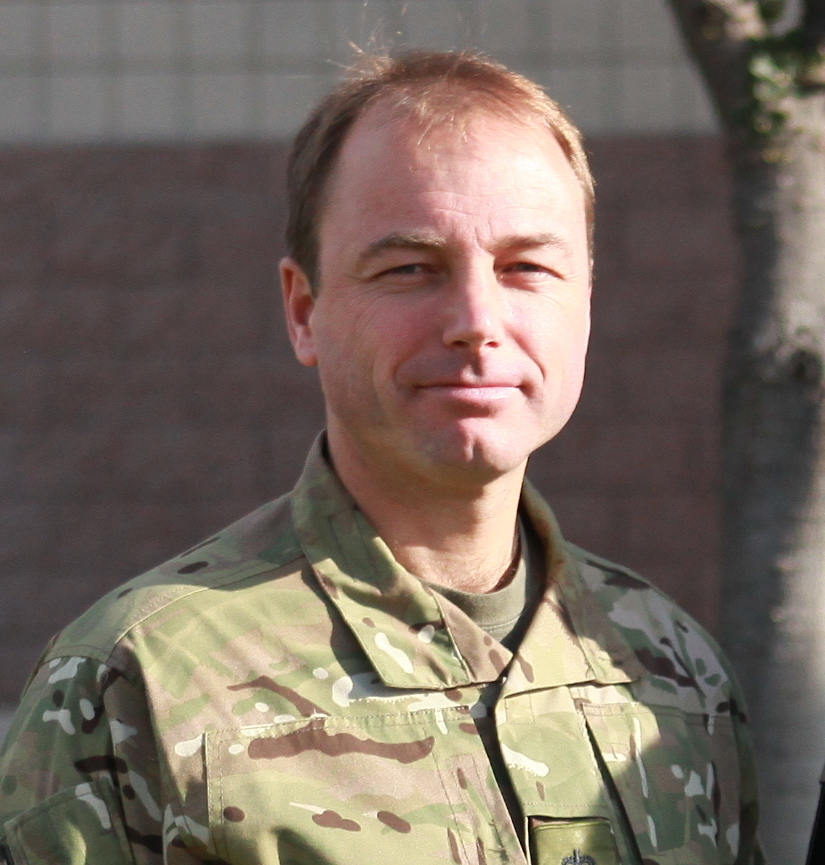
- Skeates in 2011
- Born: 1966 (age 59–60)
- Military career
- Allegiance: United Kingdom
- Branch: British Army
- Service years: 1989–2023
- Rank: Lieutenant General
- Commands: Standing Joint Force; Royal Military Academy Sandhurst; 19th Light Brigade; 26th Regiment Royal Artillery
- Conflicts: The Troubles; Gulf War; Bosnian War; Iraq War; War in Afghanistan
- Awards: Companion of the Order of the Bath; Commander of the Order of the British Empire

Lieutenant General Stuart Richard Skeates, CB, CBE (born 1966) is a retired senior British Army officer. He served as Deputy Commander of JFC Brunssum from December 2018 to December 2021. He also previously served as Commander, Standing Joint Force Headquarters from 2015 to 2018.

== Early life and education ==
Skeates was born in 1966. He was educated at The Judd School in Tonbridge, King's College London (BA History, 1988; MA Defence Studies, 1999) and the Royal Military Academy Sandhurst.

== Military career ==
Skeates was commissioned into the Royal Artillery in 1989. He served in the Gulf War and in the Bosnian War, took part in the invasion of Iraq in 2003 and then served as Military Assistant to the General Officer Commanding Northern Ireland in the final years of Operation Banner. He became Commanding Officer of 26th Regiment Royal Artillery in Gütersloh, then Deputy Commander of 52nd Brigade (deployed as Task Force Helmand) and then Deputy Assistant Chief of Staff Operations at Permanent Joint Headquarters. He became Commander of 19th Light Brigade in December 2009, and Deputy Commander of I Marine Expeditionary Force (Forward) in 2011.

Skeates was appointed Commandant of the Royal Military Academy Sandhurst in August 2013. He was appointed as Commander, Standing Joint Force Headquarters on 24 June 2015. He was promoted to lieutenant general and appointed as Deputy Commander JFC Brunssum from 4 December 2018. From 12 October 2022 he was seconded to the Home Office, tasked with commanding the Manston refugee processing centre and dealing with an increase English Channel migrant crossings. He was Colonel Commandant of the Royal Artillery until 1 June 2023, and retired from the army in August 2023.

Skeates was appointed Companion of the Order of the Bath (CB) in the 2022 New Year Honours.

Military offices
| Preceded by Timothy Evans | Commandant of the Royal Military Academy Sandhurst; 2013–2015 | Succeeded by Paul Nanson |
| New title | GOC Standing Joint Force Headquarters; 2015–2018 | Succeeded by Rupert Jones |
