= Richard Vickers =

British Army general (1928–2024)

Lieutenant-General Sir Richard Vickers KCB CVO OBE
- Born: 21 August 1928
- Died: 6 February 2024 (aged 95)
- Military career
- Allegiance: United Kingdom
- Branch: British Army
- Service years: 1948–1983
- Rank: Lieutenant-General
- Service number: 400100
- Commands: The Royal Dragoons; Blues and Royals; 11th Armoured Brigade; 4th Armoured Division; RMA Sandhurst
- Awards: Knight Commander of the Order of the Bath; Commander of the Royal Victorian Order; Officer of the Order of the British Empire

Lieutenant-General Sir Richard Maurice Hilton Vickers KCB CVO OBE (21 August 1928 – 6 February 2024) was a British Army officer who served as Director-General of Army Training from 1982 until 1983.

== Military career ==
Educated at Haileybury and Imperial Service College and Royal Military Academy Sandhurst, Vickers was commissioned into the Royal Tank Regiment (RTR) in 1948, and served with the 1st Battalion of the RTR in the British Army of the Rhine (BAOR), Korea, and the Middle East until 1954. He was temporary Equerry to the Queen from 1956 until 1959 and brigade major of 7th Armoured Brigade from 1962 until 1964. He served with the 4th Battalion of the RTR in Borneo and Malaysia from 1964 until 1966 and was Commanding Officer of The Royal Dragoons from 1967 until 1968 when he became commanding officer of the Blues and Royals. Vickers was the Commander of the 11th Armoured Brigade from 1972 until 1974 and Deputy Director of Army Training 1975 until 1977. He was appointed GOC 4th Armoured Division in 1977 and then Commandant of the Royal Military Academy Sandhurst from 1979 until 1982 before he retired in 1983.

== Later life and death ==
In retirement Vickers was a Gentleman Usher to the Queen from 1986 until 1998 and Director-General of the Winston Churchill Memorial Trust from 1983 to 1993.

Vickers died on 6 February 2024, at the age of 95.

== Awards and honours ==
Vickers was made a Lieutenant of the Royal Victorian Order (LVO) in 1959 and a Commander of the Order (CVO) in 1998. He was appointed a Member of the Order of the British Empire (MBE) in 1964, promoted to an Officer of the Order (OBE) in 1970, and to a Knight Commander of the Order (KCB) in 1983.

Military offices
Preceded by Nigel Bagnall	General Officer Commanding the 4th Armoured Division; 1977–1979	Succeeded by John Akehurst
Preceded by Philip Ward	Commandant of the Royal Military Academy Sandhurst; 1979–1982	Succeeded by Geoffrey Howlett
