= Jean Laurentin =

French Brigadier General

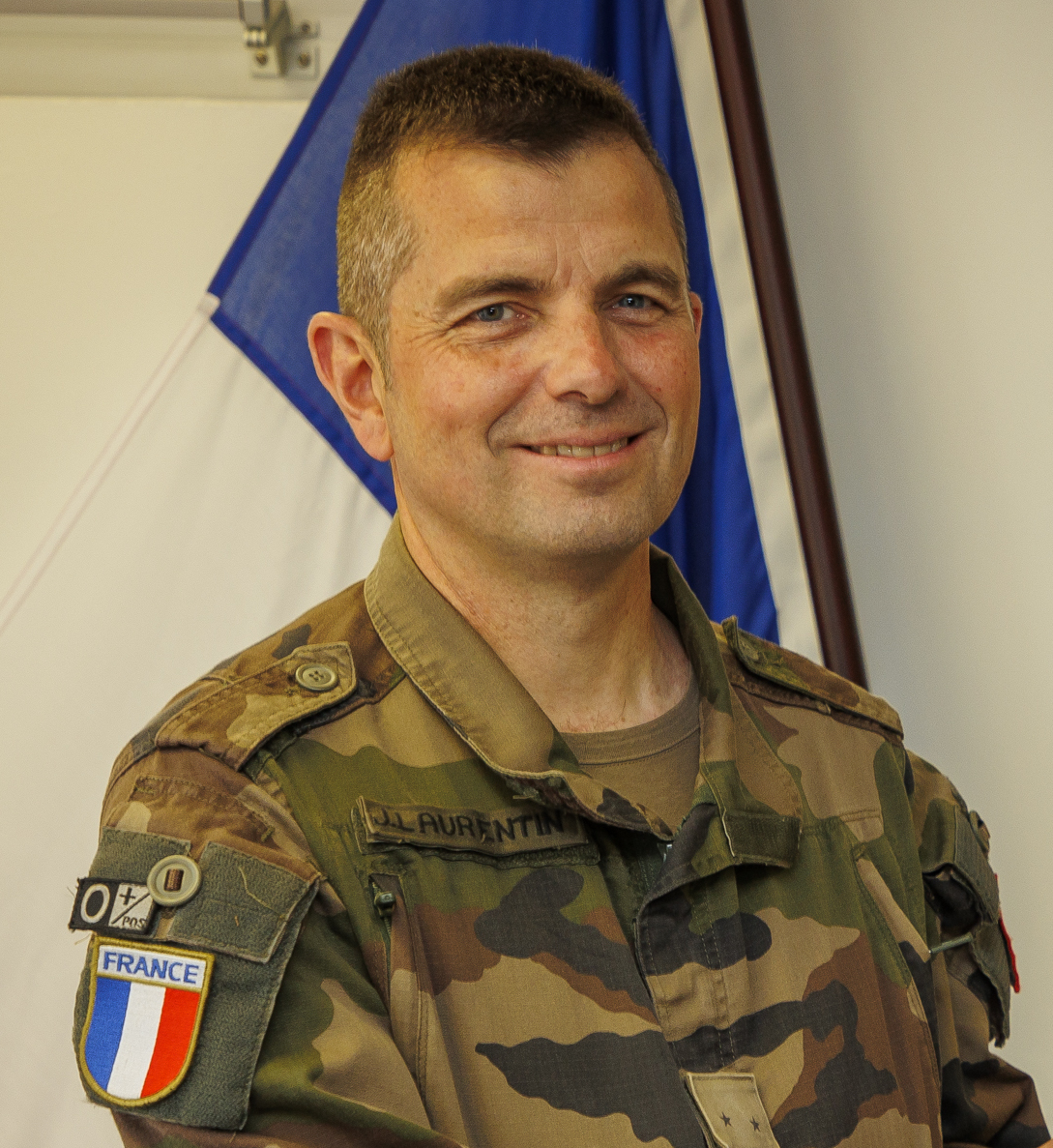
- Laurentin in 2022
- Military career
- Allegiance: France
- Branch: French Army
- Rank: Brigadier General
- Awards: Officer of the Legion of Honour; Cross for Military Valour

Brigadier General Jean Laurentin is a senior officer in the Troupes de marine which is a corps of the French Army.

== Military career ==
Laurentin joined the French Army as a lieutenant in the Troupes de marine in July 1997. He became aide-de-camp to the President of France, Nicolas Sarkozy, in August 2009 and completed the defence policy course at the Institut des hautes études de défense nationale in May 2019.

After serving as the deputy general officer commanding of the 1st (United Kingdom) Division, Laurentin was made temporary commander in June 2022, until a new general officer commanding was appointed in September 2022.

Military offices
| Preceded by Charles Collins | GOC 1st (United Kingdom) Division acting June–September 2022 | Succeeded by Tom Bateman |
