= Gerald Strickland (British Army officer) =

British Army general

Major General Gerald Strickland CB DSO MBE
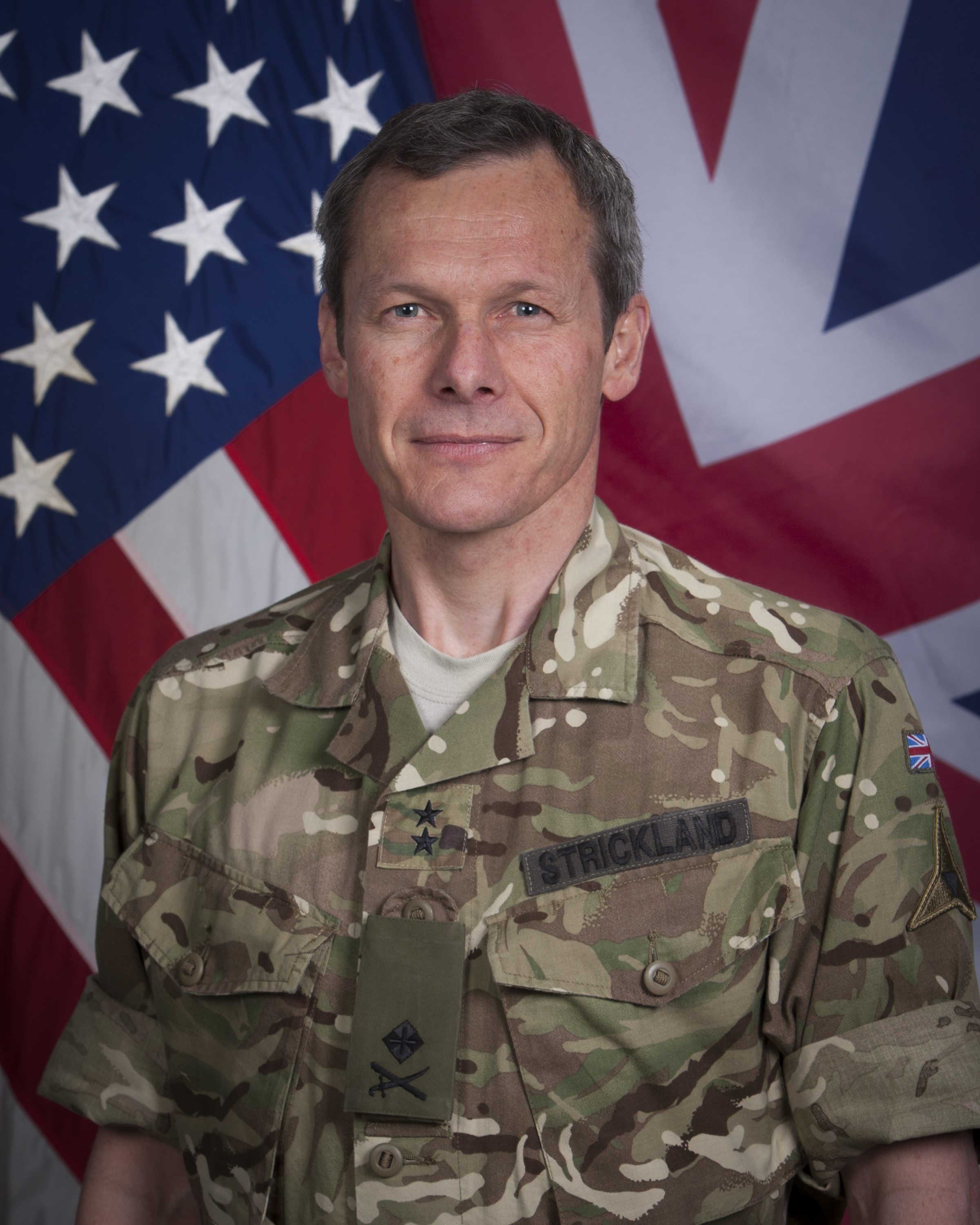
- Military career
- Allegiance: United Kingdom
- Branch: British Army
- Service years: 1989–present
- Rank: Major General
- Unit: Royal Gurkha Rifles
- Commands: 6th (United Kingdom) Division; 4th Infantry Brigade and Headquarters North East; 1st Battalion, Royal Gurkha Rifles
- Conflicts: War in Afghanistan
- Awards: Companion of the Order of the Bath; Distinguished Service Order; Member of the Order of the British Empire; Queen's Commendation for Valuable Service

Major General Gerald Mark Strickland, CB, DSO, MBE is a senior British Army officer.

== Military career ==
Strickland was commissioned as a second lieutenant into the 6th Queen Elizabeth's Own Gurkha Rifles on 3 September 1989. He was promoted to lieutenant on 11 August 1992, with a promotion to Captain in the Royal Gurkha Rifles following three years later.

He was appointed a Member of the Order of the British Empire in the 2006 New Year Honours. He undertook a tour in Afghanistan as commanding officer of the 1st Battalion, Royal Gurkha Rifles in Helmand Province in 2010, for which he was awarded the Distinguished Service Order. He went on to become commander of the 4th Infantry Brigade and Headquarters North East in May 2015, Head of Operations (Military) at the Ministry of Defence in January 2017, and Deputy Commanding General-Support, III Corps and Fort Hood in May 2019. After that he was General Officer Commanding 6th (United Kingdom) Division from September 2021 to July 2023.

Strickland was Regimental Colonel of The Royal Gurkha Rifles until September 2024, when he was appointed Colonel Commandant of the Brigade of Gurkhas.

He was appointed a Companion of the Order of the Bath (CB) in the 2026 New Year Honours.

Military offices
| Preceded by James Bowder | GOC 6th (United Kingdom) Division; 2021–2023 | Succeeded by Daniel Reeve |
