= Silvio Garattini =

Italian scientist

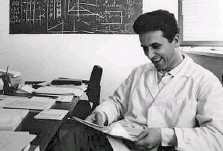
- Silvio Garattini in 1963
- Born: 12 November 1928; Bergamo, Italy
- Occupations: Physician, chemist, researcher in the field of pharmacology, professor of chemotherapy, director of the Mario Negri Institute for Pharmacological Research
- Years active: 1963 to date
- Employer: Mario Negri Institute for Pharmacological Research
- Parents: Aristotele Garattini; Silvia Viaro
- Awards: Knight of the Order of Merit of the Italian Republic
- Website: www.marionegri.it

Silvio Garattini (born in Bergamo November 12, 1928) is an Italian scientist, pharmacology research scientist, physician and professor in chemotherapy and pharmacology and director of the Mario Negri Institute for Pharmacological Research.

== Biography ==
Chemical technical specialist and medical doctor, he began his career as an assistant at the Pharmacology Institute of the University of Milan where he remained until 1962 as a senior lecturer in pharmacology and chemotherapy.

In 1963 he founded the Mario Negri Institute for Pharmacological Research of which he became the first director. Over the years, the institute developed to reach staffing of approximately 850 researchers over four different locations in Milan, Bergamo, Ranica and Santa Maria Imbaro.

From 1965 to 1968 he chaired the European Organisation for Research and Treatment of Cancer (EORTC); he is a component of the "Group 2003", a group of Italian researchers held in high esteem in the global pharmaceutical environment.

Garattini is the author of hundreds of publications in international journals and author of several treatises on pharmacology.

During his career he was a member of several national and international organizations, among which are the Committee of Biology and Medicine of the National Research Council (CNR), the Italian National Health Council and the Council of Ministers of the Presidency Commission for research policy in Italy, as well as Member of the Single Commission of the drug (CUF) of Italian Ministry of Health.

Other positions he held include:

- Consultant of World Health Organization (WHO)
- Member of the Board of the Italian Istituto Superiore di Sanità
- Member of the Committee for Proprietary Medicinal Products(CPMP) of the European Agency for the Evaluation of Medicinal Products European Medicines Agency, (EMEA).
- Member of the Executive Committee for the Research Policy (CEPR) of the Italian Ministry of University and Scientific Research and Technology
- Member of Scientific Committee of the Italian League for the Fight Against Cancer
- Vice President of the Italian Board of Health
- President of the Chemotherapy Cancer Committee of the Union for International Cancer Control
- President of the European Organisation of research on cancer (EORTC)
- President of the European Society of Biochemical Pharmacology (ESBP)
- President of the Steering Advisory Group Current Controlled Trials
- President of the Commission for Research and Development of the Italian drug Agency (AIFA)
- Director of European Research Center for Drug Discovery and Development (NatSynDrugs).

He is a fellow of the New York Academy of Sciences, of the American Association for the Advancement of Science and emeritus fellow of the Royal College of Physicians}.

During his long career he received numerous national and international honours, including: the Legion of Honour of the French Republic for scientific merits, Grand Official of Italian Republic and several honorary degrees from several European universities. He received the America Award of the Italy-USA Foundation in 2018.

== Controversies ==
In 1996 he was criticized by supporters of the Di Bella method because he denied, as a member of the CUF (single commission of the drug), moving somatostatin from the H band to a group A drug which would have provided for the free supply of the drug. This was due to the lack of scientific proof of its effectiveness. He is also criticized by the animalist movements for his favourable position towards animal testing and for having responded to their accusations of gratuitous violence on animals "animal testing is irreplaceable and necessary. Those opposed will have to assume their responsibilities for care and drugs that will not be found. Research cannot be stopped".

== Honours and recognition ==
=== Italy ===
- Commanders of the Order of Merit of the Italian Republic - Awarded on December 27, 1990.

- Grand Officer Order of Merit of the Italian Republic - Awarded on December 27, 2005.

- Gold Medal awarded on February 1, 2010.

=== Europe ===
- Knight of Legion of Honour on 1984.

Honoris Causa from Autonomous University of Barcelona in 1982.

Honoris Causa from University of Białystok in 1984
