= David Alexander-Sinclair =

British Army general (1927–2014)

Major-General David Alexander-Sinclair CB
- Born: 2 May 1927
- Died: 7 February 2014 (aged 86)
- Military career
- Allegiance: United Kingdom
- Branch: British Army
- Service years: 1946–1982
- Rank: Major-General
- Service number: 364585
- Unit: Rifle Brigade (The Prince Consort's Own)
- Commands: Staff College, Camberley; 1st Division; 6th Armoured Brigade
- Awards: Companion of the Order of the Bath

Major-General David Boyd Alexander-Sinclair, CB (2 May 1927 – 7 February 2014) was a British Army officer who commanded the 1st Division from 1975 to 1977.

== Military career ==
Educated at Eton College, Alexander-Sinclair was commissioned into the Rifle Brigade (The Prince Consort's Own) in 1946. In 1967 he was given command of 3rd Bn Royal Green Jackets. He was appointed commander of the 6th Armoured Brigade in 1971, General Officer Commanding 1st Division in 1975, and chief of staff at UK Land Forces in 1978. His last role was as Commandant of the Staff College, Camberley, in 1980 before he retired in 1982. He died on 7 February 2014.

== Family ==
In 1958 Alexander-Sinclair married Ann Ruth Daglish; they had two sons and one daughter.

Military offices
Preceded by John Stanier	General Officer Commanding 1st Division; 1975–1977	Succeeded by Richard Lawson
Preceded by Frank Kitson	Commandant of the Staff College, Camberley; 1980–1982	Succeeded by John Akehurst
