= Standing Joint Force Headquarters =

- Active: 2015 – present
- Country: United Kingdom
- Branch: Royal Navy; British Army; Royal Air Force
- Type: Joint Command
- Part of: Strategic Command – Joint Expeditionary Force, Combined Joint Expeditionary Force
- Headquarters: Northwood Headquarters, Hertfordshire

Commanders
- Current commander: Major General Tom Bateman

The Standing Joint Force Headquarters (SJFHQ) is a rapidly deployable component of the British Armed Forces that provides operational command and control to the Joint Expeditionary Force. The headquarters is responsible to the Chief of Joint Operations through the Chief of Staff (Operations). The Joint Force Headquarters (JFHQ) and Joint Force Logistics Component Headquarters (JFLogC) both come under the command of the SJFHQ Commander and are based at Northwood Headquarters.

== History ==
The formation was established, with Major General Stuart Skeates as its first commander, in June 2015.

== Commanders ==
- June 2015–November 2018 Major General Stuart Skeates
- November 2018–July 2021 Major General Rupert Jones
- July 2021–April 2024 Major General James Morris
- April 2024–present Major General Tom Bateman
