= Nick Welch (British Army officer) =

British Assistant Chief of the General Staff

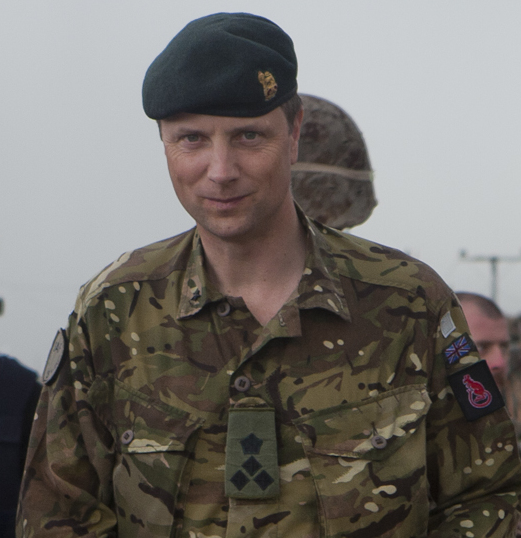
- Brigadier Welch in 2011
- Born: c. 1964
- Military career
- Allegiance: United Kingdom
- Branch: British Army
- Service years: 1984–2018
- Rank: Major General
- Commands: 7 Armoured Brigade; 1st Battalion, Royal Gloucestershire, Berkshire and Wiltshire Regiment
- Conflicts: Bosnian War; War in Afghanistan
- Awards: Queen's Commendation for Valuable Service

Nicholas Welch (born c. 1964) is a retrospectively dismissed British Army major general who served as the Assistant Chief of the General Staff from 2015 to 2018. In March 2021 he became the highest ranked British officer to be convicted at a court martial in over 200 years.

== Military career ==
=== Early deployments ===
Welch was commissioned into the Gloucestershire Regiment on 20 April 1984. His deployments included Berlin, Northern Ireland and Belize.

=== Commanding officer and senior appointments ===
Welch became commanding officer of the 1st Battalion, the Royal Gloucestershire, Berkshire and Wiltshire Regiment in 2002 and, having been promoted to colonel on 30 June 2006, he became commander of 7 Armoured Brigade based in Bergen-Hohne, Germany in March 2009. He was deployed with 2nd Marine Expeditionary Brigade as the deputy commander of Regional Command (South West) in Afghanistan in September 2011.

He briefly served as Deputy Director of Strategic Studies in the Ministry of Defence before becoming Director Army Division at the Joint Services Command and Staff College in August 2012. He went on to be Chief of Staff, Allied Rapid Reaction Corps in July 2014, and Assistant Chief of the General Staff in December 2015.

Welch retired from the Army with the rank of Major General in April 2018.

=== Honours ===
Welch was awarded the Queen's Commendation for Valuable Service for service in the former Yugoslavia in March 2005. He was appointed a Member of the Order of the British Empire (MBE) in the 2001 New Year Honours and promoted to Officer of the Order of the British Empire (OBE) in the 2006 New Year Honours. The award of the OBE was annulled and cancelled in August 2023.

== Civilian life ==
=== Arts University Bournemouth ===
After leaving the army, Welch was appointed Chief Operating Officer of Arts University Bournemouth in 2018. He was later dismissed from the role in 2021 following his conviction for fraud.

=== Fraud conviction and retroactive dismissal from Army ===
In 2017 the Army commenced an investigation into Welch of an improper use of an education allowance. The allowance was designed to allow Welch and wife to live in London closer to his role at the Ministry of Defence while their children attended boarding school in Dorset. However records showed that Welch's wife spent the majority of her time at the couple's cottage in Dorset rather than London. At a four week court martial held in March 2021, Welch has found guilty of dishonestly and fraudulently claiming £48,000 of school fees from 2015 to 2017 and was sentenced to 21 months in a civilian prison. He was also retrospectively dismissed from the army.

It was reported that Welch was the most senior Army officer to face a court martial since 1815.

Military offices
Preceded by David Cullen	Assistant Chief of the General Staff; 2015–2018	Succeeded by Rupert Jones
