= Daniel Reeve =

British Army general

Major General Daniel Reeve MC
- Military career
- Allegiance: United Kingdom
- Branch: British Army
- Service years: 1994–present
- Rank: Major General
- Service number: 549603
- Unit: The Rifles
- Commands: 1st (United Kingdom) Division; 6th (United Kingdom) Division; 77th Brigade; 3rd Battalion, The Rifles
- Conflicts: War in Afghanistan
- Awards: Military Cross

Major General Daniel Reeve MC is a senior British Army officer, who served as General Officer Commanding 1st (United Kingdom) Division from 2024 to 2025.

== Military career ==
Reeve was commissioned into the Educational and Training Services Branch on 16 December 1994. He was awarded the Military Cross for gallant and distinguished services in Afghanistan in 2010, and went on to become commanding officer of the 3rd Battalion, The Rifles.

Reeve became commander of the 77th Brigade in December 2018, was promoted to brigadier on 30 June 2019, and became the deputy colonel of The Rifles on 20 July. He was appointed Chief, Joint Force Operations at Permanent Joint Headquarters in August 2021. After serving as British commander during the evacuation of British nationals during the Sudan conflict in April 2023, he was promoted to major general and became General Officer Commanding 6th (United Kingdom) Division in July 2023.

Reeve was appointed Assistant Colonel Commandant of The Rifles on 1 November 2023. He became General Officer Commanding 1st (United Kingdom) Division in March 2024.

Military offices
Preceded by Gerald Strickland	GOC 6th (United Kingdom) Division; 2023–2024	Division no longer active
Preceded by Tom Bateman	GOC 1st (United Kingdom) Division; 2024–2025	Succeeded by Robert Hedderwick
