= David Cullen (British Army officer) =

Major General David Cullen CB OBE
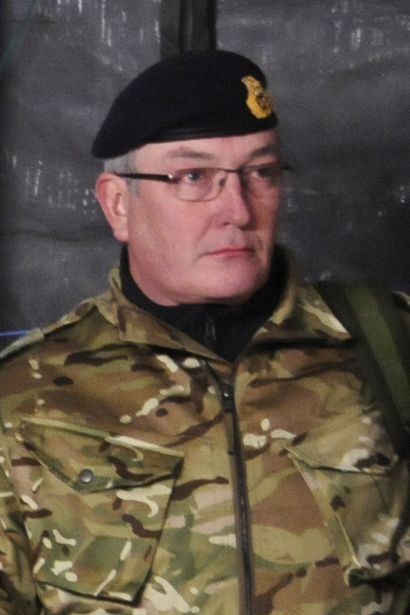
- Major General David Cullen in 2015.
- Military career
- Allegiance: United Kingdom
- Branch: British Army
- Service years: 1982–2016
- Rank: Major General
- Service number: 513865
- Unit: Royal Artillery
- Commands: 12th Mechanized Brigade; 1st Regiment Royal Horse Artillery
- Conflicts: Iraq War; War in Afghanistan
- Awards: Companion of the Order of the Bath; Officer of the Order of the British Empire

Major General David Mark Cullen, CB, OBE is a senior British Army officer. He served as the Assistant Chief of the General Staff from 2013 to 2015.

== Military career ==
After being educated at the Duke of York's Royal Military School and the Royal Military Academy Sandhurst, Cullen was commissioned into the Royal Artillery in 1982. He served as commanding officer of the 1st Regiment Royal Horse Artillery during deployment to Basra in Iraq in 2004, for which he was appointed an Officer of the Order of the British Empire. He was made Commander of the 12th Mechanized Brigade in November 2007, in which role he saw service in Afghanistan, Director of Army Staff in December 2009, and Chief of Staff for Land Forces in October 2011. He went on to became Deputy Commanding General-Support, III Corps and Fort Hood in October 2012 and served as Assistant Chief of the General Staff from January 2013 to December 2015. Cullen retired from the British Army on 11 May 2016.

Military offices
Preceded by James Everard	Assistant Chief of the General Staff; 2013–2015	Succeeded by Nick Welch
