= Geoffrey Howlett =

British Army general (1930–2022)

General Sir Geoffrey Howlett KBE MC
- Born: 5 February 1930; Bangalore, British India
- Died: 21 April 2022 (aged 92); Yeovil, Somerset, England
- Relatives: Bernard Howlett (father)
- Military career
- Allegiance: United Kingdom
- Branch: British Army
- Service years: 1950–1990
- Rank: General
- Service number: 411979
- Commands: Allied Forces Northern Europe (1986–1989); South East District (1983–1985); Royal Military Academy Sandhurst (1982–1983); 1st Armoured Division (1979–1982); 16th Parachute Brigade (1975–1977); 2nd Battalion, The Parachute Regiment (1971–1973)
- Conflicts: Malayan Emergency; Suez Crisis; Cyprus Emergency; The Troubles
- Awards: Knight Commander of the Order of the British Empire; Officer of the Order of the British Empire for Gallantry; Military Cross

General Sir Geoffrey Hugh Whitby Howlett, KBE, MC (5 February 1930 – 21 April 2022) was a senior British Army officer who was Commander-in-Chief of Allied Forces Northern Europe.

== Early life and military career ==
Geoffrey Hugh Whitby Howlett was born in Bangalore, British India on 5 February 1930. He was educated at Wellington College and at the Royal Military College, Sandhurst, Howlett was commissioned into the Queen's Own Royal West Kent Regiment in 1950. He was awarded the Military Cross in 1952.

In 1971 Howlett was appointed commanding officer of 2nd Battalion, The Parachute Regiment and in 1975 he was made commander of 16th Parachute Brigade. He was general officer commanding 1st Armoured Division from 1979 and Commandant of the Royal Military Academy Sandhurst from 1982 to 1983 when he became GOC South East District. He was made Commander-in-Chief of Allied Forces Northern Europe in 1986; he retired in 1989.

Howlett was colonel commandant of the Parachute Regiment from 1983 to 1990.

== Death ==
Howlett died at a hospital in Yeovil, Somerset, on 21 April 2022, at the age of 92.

Military offices
Preceded by Richard Lawson	GOC 1st Armoured Division; 1979–1982	Succeeded by Brian Kenny
Preceded by Richard Vickers	Commandant of the Royal Military Academy Sandhurst; 1982–1983	Succeeded by Richard Keightley
Preceded by Sir Richard Trant	GOC South East District; 1983–1985	Succeeded by Sir Michael Gray
Preceded by Sir Richard Lawson	C-in-C Allied Forces Northern Europe; 1986–1989	Succeeded by Sir Patrick Palmer
