= Mario Negri Institute for Pharmacological Research =

Nonprofit research institute in Italy

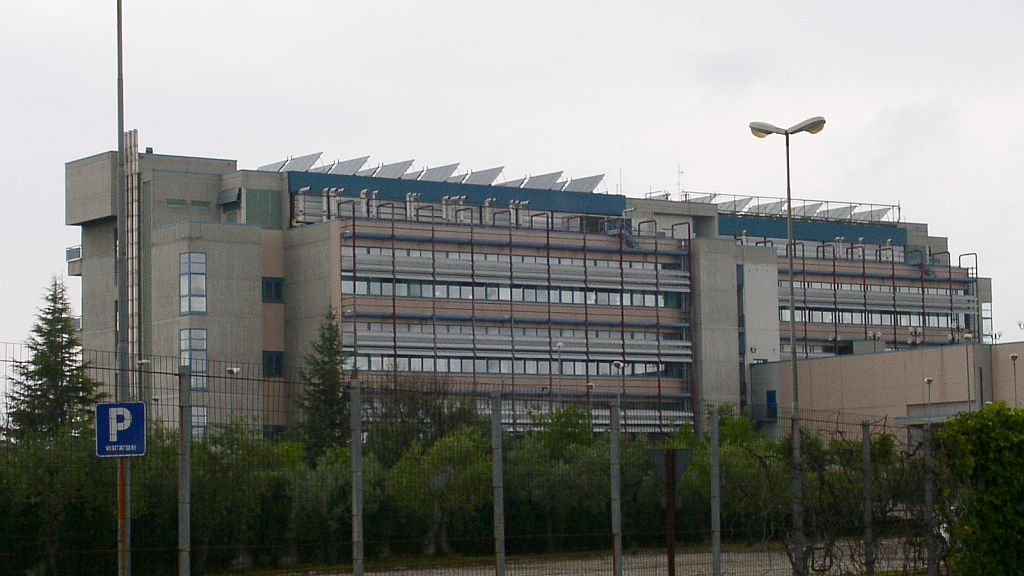
The "Mario Negri Sud" in Santa Maria Imbaro

The Mario Negri Institute for Pharmacological Research (Italian: Istituto di Ricerche Farmacologiche Mario Negri) is a nonprofit research institute dedicated to clinical and biomedical research. It was made possible by a special bequest of Milan philanthropist Mario Negri (1891 – 1960). It was founded in 1961 although it started working in Milan from 1st Feb 1963. There are branches of the institute in Bergamo, Ranica (BG), and at Santa Maria Imbaro, near Chieti.

Founder and director from 1961 to 2018 was Silvio Garattini.

Giuseppe Remuzzi has been the director since 2018.

== See also ==
- Centro Studi GISED
