= Robert Hedderwick =

British Army general

Major General Robert Hedderwick
- Military career
- Allegiance: United Kingdom
- Branch: British Army
- Service years: 1997–present
- Rank: Major General
- Unit: Royal Regiment of Scotland
- Commands: 1st (United Kingdom) Division; Army Special Operations Brigade; Black Watch
- Conflicts: Iraq War; War in Afghanistan; War against the Islamic State
- Awards: Queen's Commendation for Valuable Service

Major General Robert Sholto James Hedderwick is a senior British Army officer, currently serving as General Officer Commanding 1st (United Kingdom) Division.

== Military career ==
Hedderick was commissioned into the Black Watch on 9 August 1997. He served as commanding officer of the Black Watch from October 2016 to December 2018. He became commander of the Army Special Operations Brigade in 2022, and General Officer Commanding 1st (United Kingdom) Division in August 2025.

Hedderick was awarded the Queen's Commendation for Valuable Service in the 2019 Special Honours.

Military offices
Preceded by Daniel Reeve	GOC 1st (United Kingdom) Division; 2025–present	Incumbent
