= Santa Maria Imbaro =

- Comune
- Comune di Santa Maria Imbaro
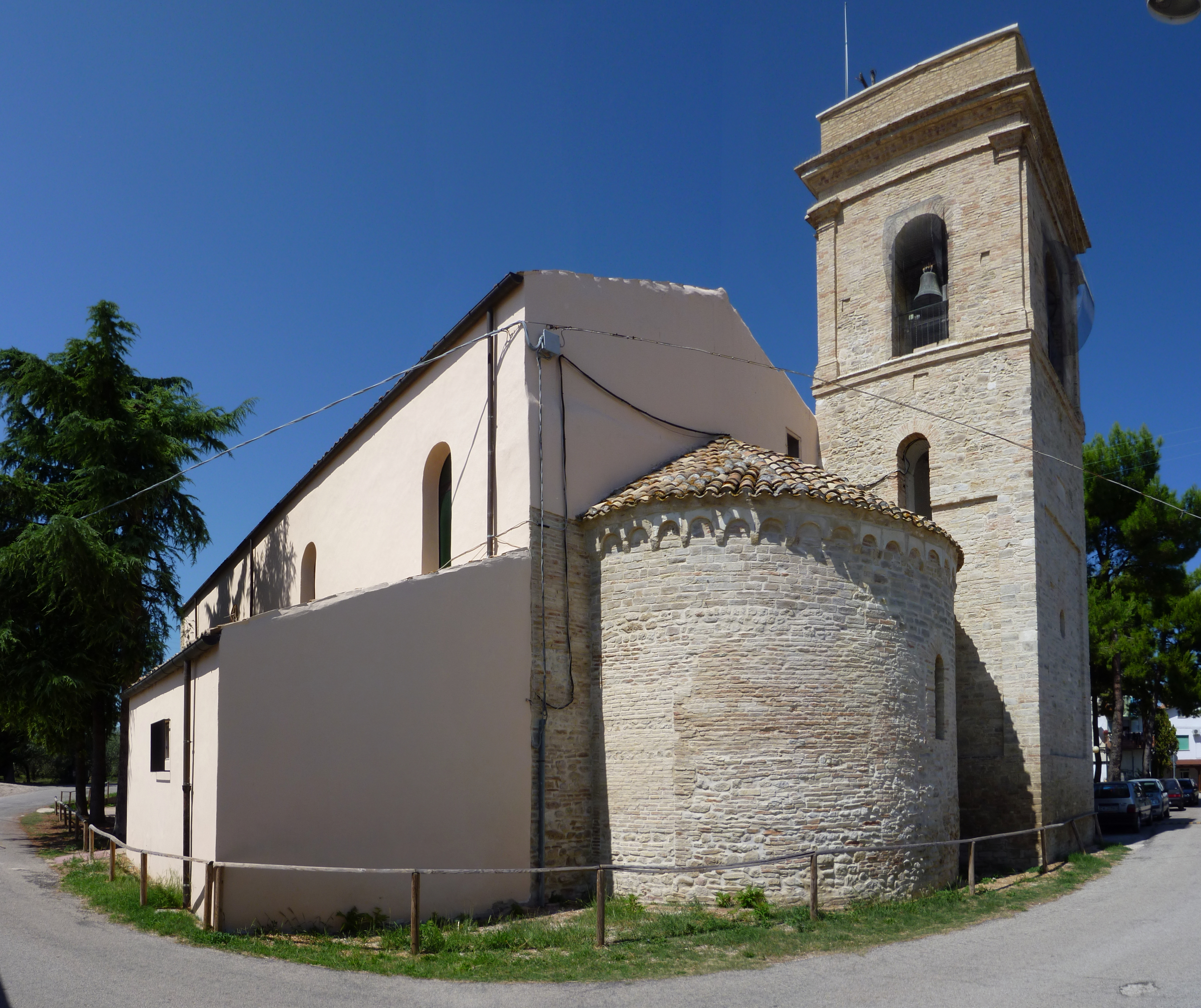
- Church of Santa Maria Imbaro.

- Location within Italy Location within Abruzzo
- Coordinates: 42°13′N 14°27′E
- Country: Italy
- Region: Abruzzo
- Province: Chieti (CH)
- Frazioni: Colli, Fattore, Pagliarini, Perilli

Government
  - Mayor: Maria Giulia Di Nunzio

Area
  - Total: 6.01 km^{2} (2.32 sq mi)
- Elevation: 224 m (735 ft)

Population (30 November 2014)
  - Total: 2,000
  - Density: 330/km^{2} (860/sq mi)
- Demonym: Santamarmaroli
- Time zone: UTC+1 (CET)
  - Summer (DST): UTC+2 (CEST)
- Postal code: 66030
- Dialing code: 0872
- ISTAT code: 069084
- Patron saint: Madonna
- Saint day: 4 March

Santa Maria Imbaro (locally Sanda Marmàre) is a comune and town in the province of Chieti in the Abruzzo region of Italy
