= 1st (UK) Division =

Light division of the British Army

1st Division; 1st Infantry Division; 1st (United Kingdom) Division
- Divisional insignia adopted in 1983
- Active: 1809–1978; 2014 onwards
- Country: United Kingdom
- Branch: British Army
- Type: Light infantry
- Part of: Land Forces Command
- Garrison/HQ: Imphal Barracks, York, United Kingdom
- Anniversaries: Peninsular Day
- Engagements: Peninsular War; War of the Sixth Coalition; War of the Seventh Coalition; Crimean War; Anglo-Zulu War; Second Boer War; World War I Irish War of Independence; 1936–1939 Arab revolt in Palestine; World War II; Jewish insurgency in Mandatory Palestine; Iraq War
- Website: www.army.mod.uk/learn-and-explore/about-the-army/formations-divisions-and-brigades/1st-united-kingdom-division/

Commanders
- Current commander: Major General Robert Hedderwick

Insignia
- c. 1939–1960s

- c. 1960s–1983

The 1st (United Kingdom) Division is an active division of the British Army that has been formed and disestablished numerous times between 1809 and the present. In its original incarnation as the 1st Division, it took part in the Peninsular War—part of the Coalition Wars of the Napoleonic Wars—and was disbanded in 1814 but was re-formed the following year for service in the War of the Seventh Coalition and fought at the Battle of Waterloo. It remained active as part of the British occupation of France until it was disbanded in 1818, when the British military withdrew. The division was then raised as needed; it served in the Crimean War, the Anglo-Zulu War, and the Second Boer War. In 1902, the British Army formed several permanent divisions, which included the 1st Division, which fought in the First World War, made various deployments during the interwar period, and took part in the Second World War when it was known as the 1st Infantry Division.

In the post-war period, the division was deployed to Mandatory Palestine on internal security operations during the Jewish insurgency. In 1948, when all British troops left, the division transferred to Tripoli, Libya, which was then under occupation by Anglo-French forces following the conclusion of the Second World War. With rising tensions in Egypt, the division was moved there to defend the Suez Canal. It remained there until 1955, when it was withdrawn to the UK as Britain removed its military from the area. The stay in the UK was short because there was little need for an additional divisional headquarters, and the division was disbanded on 30 June 1960. The following day, it was reformed in Germany as the 1st Division by the renaming of the 5th Division and served as part of I (British) Corps, and helped pioneer new tactics. On 1 April 1978, the division changed designation to the 1st Armoured Division (United Kingdom).

In 2014, the formation was reborn as the 1st (United Kingdom) Division and transformed into a light infantry formation. The following year, the headquarters moved from Germany to Imphal Barracks, York. It is currently planned for the headquarters to be relocated to Catterick Garrison after 2028.

== History ==
=== Divisional history 1809–1945 ===
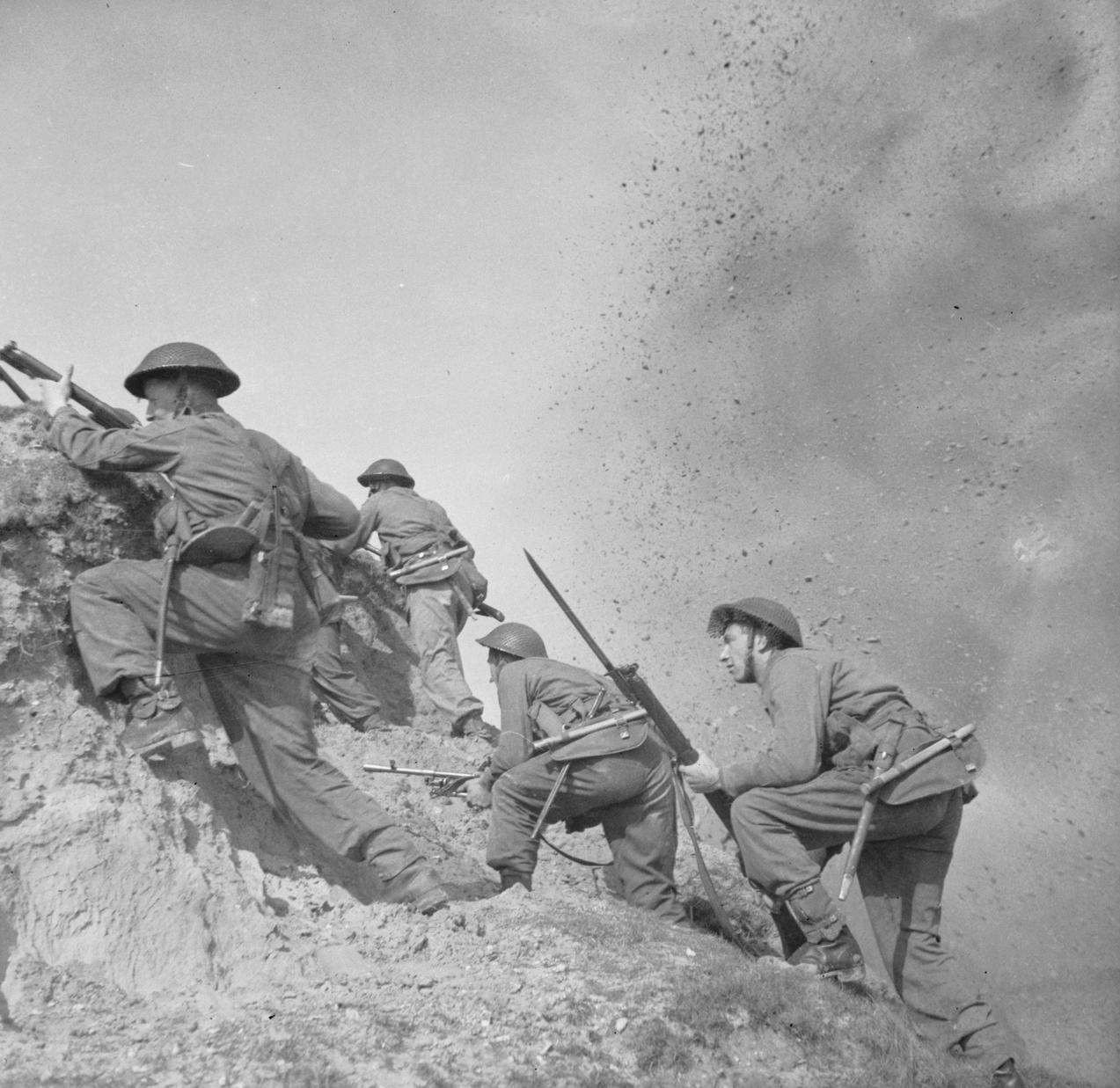
Second World War-era troops of the 1st Infantry Division, during an exercise.

The 1st Division was formed on 18 June 1809 by Lieutenant-General Arthur Wellesley, commander of British forces in Spain and Portugal, for service during the Peninsular War—part of the Napoleonic Wars. (Note: The division's official history's latest edition, authored by Wilson in 1993, and defence analyst Charles Heyman, both write that the 1st Armoured Division was formed in 1940; disbanded soon after the end of the Second World War; reformed 1978; and disbanded 2014. Confused mentions at various dates on British Army websites have conflated the two divisions; see also) After the conclusion of the War of the Sixth Coalition, the division was broken up in France and its troops dispersed to the UK or were dispatched to North America to take part in the War of 1812. The division was reformed the following year when the War of the Seventh Coalition began, and it fought at the battles of Quatre Bras and Waterloo. In the latter battle, the division helped repulse the final attack of the day, which the French Imperial Guard had launched. With the end of the war, the division became part of the Army of Occupation based in France, where it remained until December 1818, when it was disbanded upon the British withdrawal and the end of the occupation.

During the mid-to late-19th century, several formations bearing the name 1st Division were formed, each for a particular conflict. According to the division's official website, three such formations form part of its lineage: those that fought in the Crimean War (1854–1856), the Anglo-Zulu War (1879), and the Second Boer War (1899–1900). In 1902, the division was reformed as a permanent formation within the British Army and was stationed at Aldershot. During the First World War (1914–1918), it was deployed to France and fought on the Western Front throughout the conflict. In 1918, following the Armistice of 11 November 1918, it marched into Germany and became part of the occupation force the British Army of the Rhine. In March 1919, the 1st Division was redesignated as the Western Division and ceased to exist. It was reformed on 4 June 1919 at Aldershot and was the only division maintained in a state of readiness in the immediate post-war years. Detachments were dispatched to take part in the Irish War of Independence, to reinforce the Occupation of Constantinople, and to help oversee the 1935 Saar status referendum. From September to December 1936, the entire division was deployed to Palestine during the opening stages of the Arab revolt. The majority of its troops were returned to the UK by the end of the year and the remainder returned in 1937. During the Second World War, by which time it was known as the 1st Infantry Division, the formation took part in the Battle of France, the Tunisian campaign, and the Italian campaign. In February 1945, it was transferred from Italy to Palestine and remained there for the final stages of the war.

=== Post-war and Cold War ===
With the exception of the period December 1945–March 1946, when the division moved to Egypt to reorganise, the 1st Infantry Division remained in Palestine until May 1948. During this time, it was assigned to internal security operations during the Jewish insurgency. Its forces were deployed to Haifa and Galilee, and to guard the northern border. As part of the general British withdrawal from Palestine, in May 1948, the division relocated to Tripoli, which was at the time part of the British Military Administration (Libya). In August 1951 during the Korean War, the 1st Commonwealth Division was activated. Due to a lack of troops in the theatre, engineer and signal personnel from the 1st Infantry Division were sent to join the newly formed formation in Korea. The 1st Infantry Division's time in Libya lasted until November 1951, when it joined the 80-000-strong British garrison in Egypt. Located in the Ismailia region, it was tasked with the defence of the Suez Canal and British interests in the Middle East. By 1952 it was made up of the 1st, 2nd, and 3rd Infantry Brigades, each with three battalions, plus divisional troops. But in October 1951 a new Egyptian government had abrogated the Anglo-Egyptian Treaty of 1936, under which British troops were to remain in the canal area. The ensuing political landscape saw increased animosity to the British presence, eventually resulting in an agreement to withdraw. By December 1955 the division was back in the UK, but only with the 2nd and 3rd Brigades. After its return, the division was used as a source of personnel for formations overseas and was never brought up to full strength.

On 30 June 1960, by which point there was no need for an additional divisional headquarters in the UK, the 1st Infantry Division was disbanded. The next day, 1 July 1960, the 1st Division "peremptorily asserted the rights of the senior formation" and the 5th Division in Germany disappeared, being replaced by the 1st. The division was located at Verden an der Aller, Germany, and formed part of the I (British) Corps of the British Army of the Rhine (BAOR). The 1st Infantry Division's insignia was a white triangle. The red outline appears to have been adopted in the 1960s; German officials described it as resembling a give way sign. At the end of the 1960s, the formation conducted division-wide trials using the "square brigade" concept. When they were deemed successful in 1970, all brigades within the BAOR were reorganised accordingly. (Note: Square brigades at this time were envisaged as two armoured regiments and two mechanised infantry battalions. This differed from the previous infantry brigades, of three infantry battalions and one tank regiment, and armoured brigades of three armoured regiments and one infantry battalion.) In the late 1960s, new anti-tank and defence in depth concepts were developed as fears of a possible Warsaw Pact surprise attack grew. Major-General Edwin Bramall promoted these new ideas when he took command of the 1st Division in January 1972. Bramall felt there was an over-reliance on the arrival of reinforcements to resist an offensive by the Soviet Union rather than the BAOR being able to do so itself. Using the division, the new tactics were refined and were later adopted by BAOR, and further developed at a higher level in the mid-1970s. (Note: The basic concept was to draw Soviet armoured forces into kill zones along their anticipated route of advance. These zones would be mined, and Soviet tanks engaged by anti-tank guided missile-equipped infantry and tanks in hull down positions to inflict heavy casualties. The BAOR would conduct a fighting withdrawal as needed using its own reinforcements to counterattack any Soviet breakthroughs. It was expected such methods would allow the BAOR to resist an offensive for five days without receiving external reinforcements. Because this strategy required tanks to be used in a more-defensive manner, it ran counter to the then-established doctrine that called for tanks to be used in a more-offensive capacity and in a local counterattack role.)

On 1 April 1978, the 1st Division was redesignated as the 1st Armoured Division. The division's 7th and the 11th Armoured Brigades became defunct, and were replaced by Task Force Alpha and Task Force Bravo.

=== Afghanistan ===
From 2006 onwards, Task Force Helmand, which was based on a reinforced brigade, was formed to conduct stabilisation-and counterinsurgency missions in Helmand Province, Afghanistan. Under the oversight of this task force, the division deployed the 20th Armoured Brigade between October 2011 and April 2012. The next deployment came between October 2013 and June 2014, when the 7th Armoured Brigade was sent to Afghanistan. The final deployment, which coincided with the disbanding of the task force and the British withdrawal from Helmand, was made by the 20th Armoured Brigade between June and December 2014.

As with the Gulf War, the division returned to Germany following its time in Iraq and continued to be headquartered at Hereford. While deploying a brigade at a time to Iraq under the oversight of the Multi-National Division (South-East), the 1st (UK) Armoured Division maintained command over the 4th Armoured Brigade based at Osnabrück, the 7th Armoured Brigade at Bergen, and the 20th Armoured Brigade at Paderborn. Combined with the divisional assets and support personnel, the formation was around 17,000 strong. In 2006, following decisions made in the 2003 Delivering Security in a Changing World white paper, the 4th Armoured Brigade was converted into the 4th Mechanized Brigade, a move that decreased the number of its tank regiments and replaced them with infantry battalions. Two years later, the brigade was moved to England and joined the 3rd Division, which reduced the division to two brigades. By 2013, the 7th Armoured Brigade had relocated to Hohne.

=== Transition to light infantry ===
The Strategic Defence and Security Review 2010 made a commitment to rebase all remaining British forces stationed in Germany and to move them to the UK. The review also outlined the Army 2020 plan, which aimed to restructure the army from one optimized for the War in Afghanistan to one that was more flexible. This included establishing a Reaction Force and an Adaptable Force, the former of which was to based around the 3rd Division and would contain the army's tanks. This force would be primed for short-notice deployments. The Adaptable Force was to be based around the 1st Division, and would be responsible for Britain's standing commitments in Brunei, Cyprus, the Falkland Islands, public duties, and United Nation peacekeeping, and to support any enduring operations undertaken by the army.

On 21 July 2014, the division was renamed the 1st (United Kingdom) Division. The redesignation, part of the Army 2020 changes, was the start of the division's restructure from an armoured formation to one that consisted of light infantry, and the start of its role in the Adaptable Force. On 2 June 2015, the divisional headquarters moved from Germany to Imphal Barracks, York. Upon its reorganisation, the division consisted of the 4th Infantry Brigade—previously the 4th Mechanized and the 15th (North East) Brigades—and was based at Catterick Garrison); the 7th infantry Brigade—the previous 7th Armoured Brigade's headquarters merged with the 49th (Eastern) Brigade—and was based at Chetwynd Barracks, Chilwell); the 11th Infantry Brigade at Aldershot Garrison; the 38th (Irish) Brigade at Thiepval Barracks, Lisburn; the 42nd Infantry Brigade at Fulwood Barracks, Preston; the 51st Infantry Brigade at Redford Barracks, Edinburgh; the 102nd Logistic Brigade at Prince William of Gloucester Barracks, Grantham; and the 160th Infantry Brigade at The Barracks, Brecon.

Further changes occurred following the 2015 Strategic Defence and Security Review, resulting in Army 2020 Refine, which was implemented in 2019. The division then consisted of the 4th, 7th, 11th, and 51st Infantry Brigades, as well as the 2nd Medical Brigade at Queen Elizabeth Barracks, Strensall; 8th Engineer Brigade at Gibraltar Barracks, Minley; the 102nd Logistical Brigade; and the 104th Logistical Brigade at Duke of Gloucester Barracks, South Cerney. The role of the division was also expanded to "provide more strategic choice and a range of capabilities, conducting capacity building, stabilisation operations, disaster relief and UK resilience operations". In December 2020, the 1st Military Police Brigade joined the division.

=== Future Soldier ===
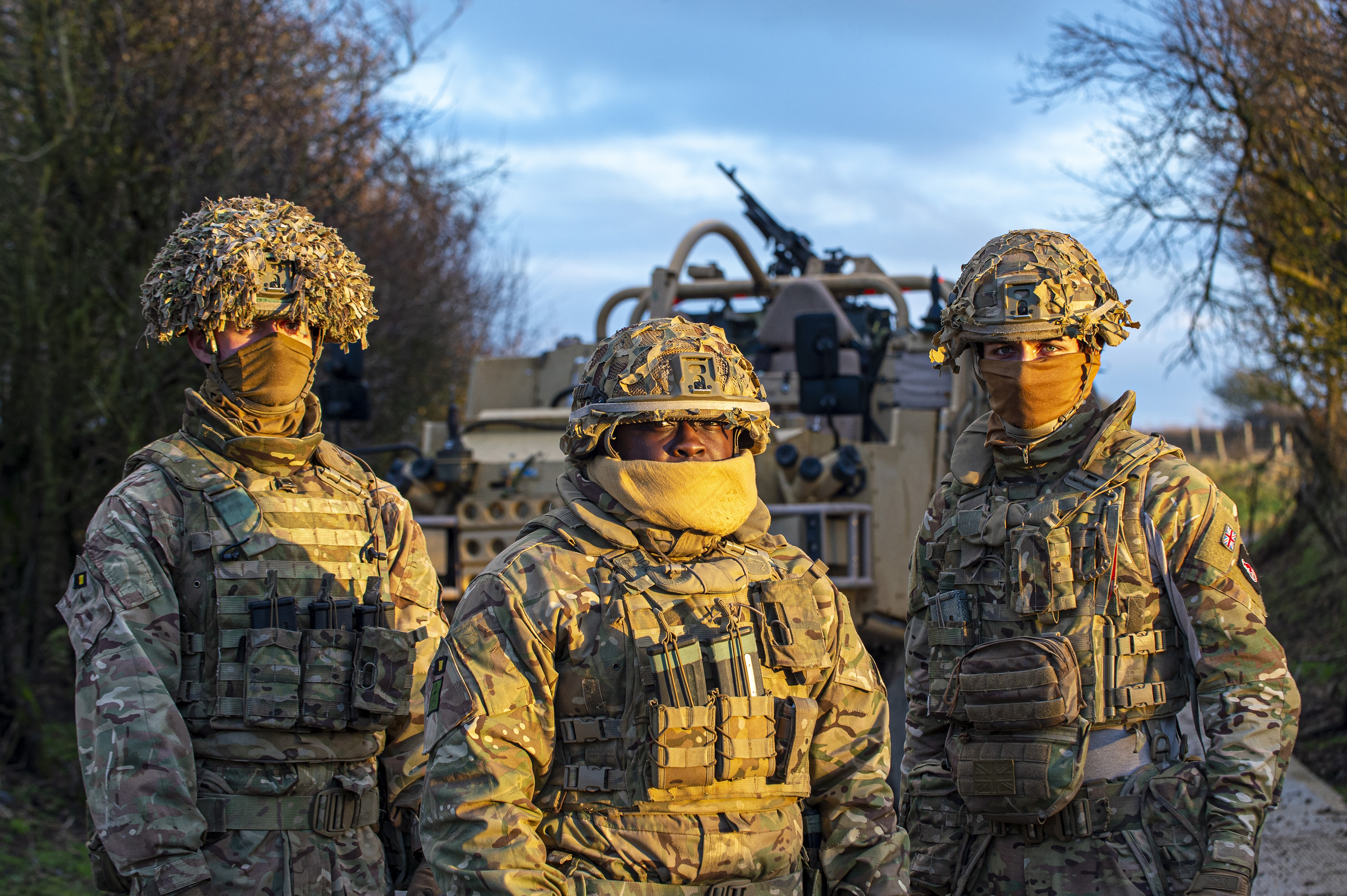
Soldiers of the division (Royal Anglian Regiment, 7th Light Mechanised Brigade) in 2021

Under the 2021 Future Soldier programme, additional organisational changes were made. The divisional headquarters will relocate to Catterick but this move will not take place before 2028. Under this programme, the division was planned to be re-organised as such:

- 4th Light Brigade Combat Team (Cottesmore)
- 7th Light Mechanised Brigade Combat Team (Catterick)
- 8th Engineer Brigade (Minley)
- 11th Security Force Assistance Brigade (Aldershot)
- 19th Brigade (York)
- 102 Operational Sustainment Brigade (Grantham; brigade HQ will move to York in 2024, then on to Catterick in 2029)
- 1st Military Intelligence Battalion, Intelligence Corps (Catterick)
- 5th Military Intelligence Battalion, Intelligence Corps (Edinburgh)
- 2nd Signal Regiment, Royal Corps of Signals (York, then will move to Catterick but not before 2028)
- 37th Signal Regiment, Royal Corps of Signals (Redditch)

Following the Future Soldier transformation, at DSEI 2023, General Patrick Sanders announced changes to the structure of the division, such as: "1st (UK) Division taking 16 Air Assault Brigade Combat Team under its command and becoming a land component command of a joint and multi-domain sovereign Global Response Force (GRF) by 2024."

In 2024, 8th Engineer Brigade was resubordinated to HQ Allied Rapid Reaction Corps.

== Organisation ==
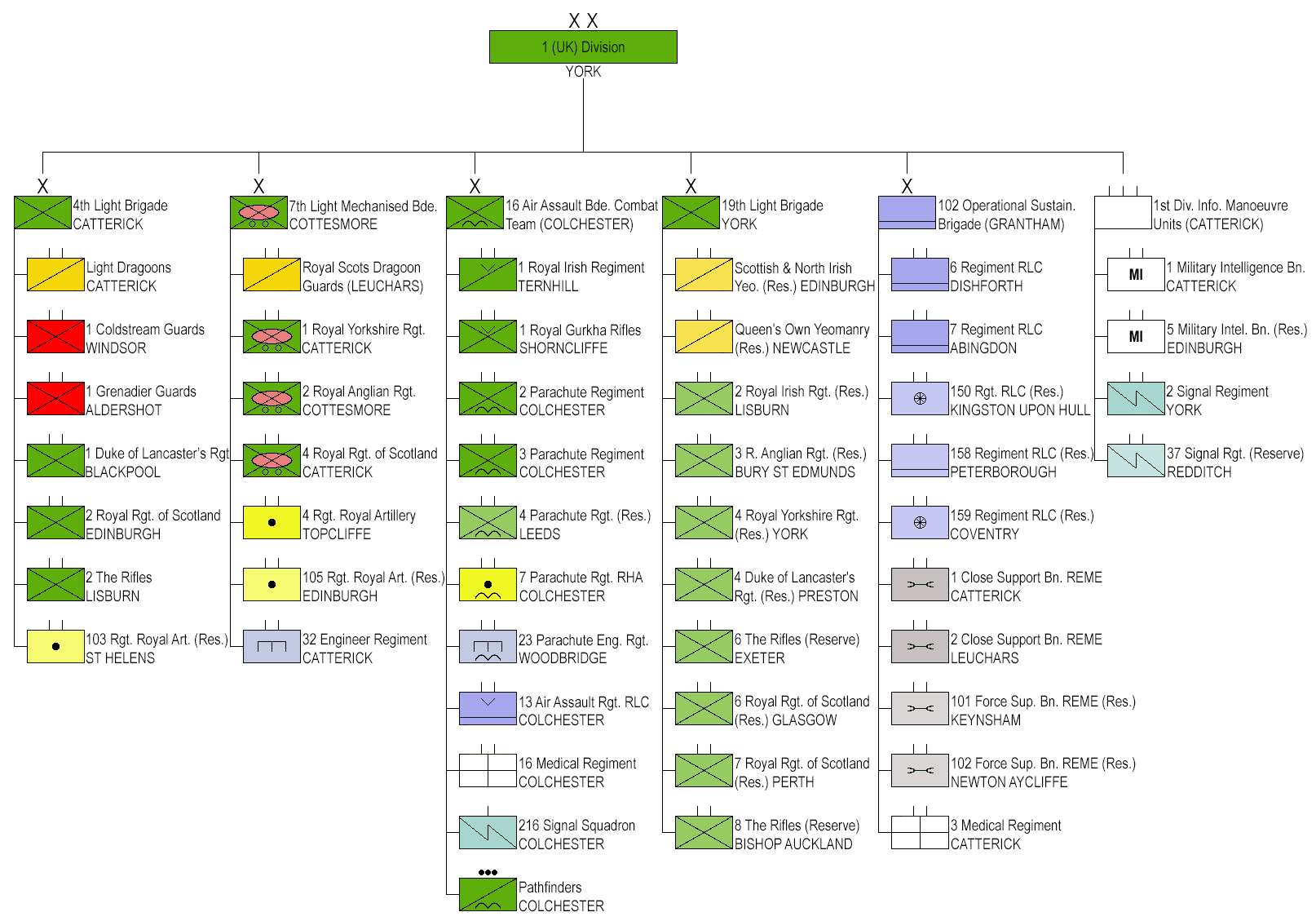
1st (UK) Division organization as of January 2026 (click to enlarge)

In late 2025 the division included:

- 4th Light Brigade (Catterick)
- 7th Light Mechanised Brigade (Cottesmore)
- 16 Air Assault Brigade (Colchester)
- 19th Brigade (York)
- 102 Operational Sustainment Brigade (Grantham; brigade HQ will move to York in 2024, then on to Catterick in 2029)
- 1st Military Intelligence Battalion, Intelligence Corps (Catterick)
- 5th Military Intelligence Battalion, Intelligence Corps (Edinburgh)
- 1st Signal Regiment, Royal Corps of Signals (Perham Down)
- 2nd Signal Regiment, Royal Corps of Signals (York, then will move to Catterick but not before 2028)
- 37th Signal Regiment, Royal Corps of Signals (Redditch)

== See also ==
- List of commanders of the British 1st Division
- List of Victoria Cross recipients from the British 1st Division
- British Forces Germany
