= Aide-de-camp general =

British Army senior honorary appointment

Aide-de-camp general is a senior honorary appointment for generals in the British Army. The recipient is appointed as an aide-de-camp general to the head of state, currently King Charles III. They are entitled to the post-nominals "ADC (Gen.)".

The Royal Air Force's equivalent appointment is air aide-de-camp, while the Royal Navy's is First and Principal Naval Aide-de-Camp.

== List of aides-de-camp general ==
Name and rank	Date of appointment	Appointment ended	Notes
General Sir William Nicholson	1 July 1910	19 June 1911	Appointment vacated on promotion to field marshal.
Lieutenant-General Sir Arthur Paget	1 July 1910	1 July 1914	
Lieutenant-General Sir Horace Smith-Dorrien	1 July 1910	1 July 1914	
Major-General Spencer Ewart	1 July 1910	1 July 1914	
General Sir John French	19 June 1911	18 February 1914	
General Sir Edmund Barrow, Indian Army	2 December 1911	17 January 1913	
General Sir O'Moore Creagh, Indian Army	2 December 1911	8 March 1914	
Lieutenant-General Sir Robert Scallon	17 January 1913	29 October 1915	
Lieutenant-General Sir Douglas Haig	18 February 1914	1 January 1917	Promoted to field marshal.
General Sir Beauchamp Duff, Indian Army	8 March 1914	3 November 1917	
Lieutenant-General Sir James Grierson	1 July 1914	17 August 1914 †	
General Sir Charles Douglas	1 July 1914	25 October 1914 †	
General Sir Ian Hamilton	1 July 1914	1 July 1918	
General Sir John Nixon, Indian Army	29 October 1915	3 November 1917	
General Sir Herbert Plumer	15 January 1917	31 July 1919	Promoted to field marshal.
General Sir Archibald Hunter	15 January 1917	1 October 1920	
General Sir William Robertson	15 January 1917	29 March 1920	Promoted to field marshal.
General Sir Arthur Barrett	3 November 1917	31 May 1920	
General Sir William Birdwood	3 November 1917	21 June 1922	
General Sir Charles Monro	1 July 1918	30 June 1922	
General the Lord Rawlinson	31 July 1919	31 July 1923	
General the Lord Horne	29 March 1920	29 March 1924	
Lieutenant-General the Earl of Cavan	1 October 1920	26 April 1922	
General Sir Claud Jacob	11 January 1921	31 May 1924	
General Sir Francis Davies	26 April 1922	26 April 1926	
General Sir Havelock Hudson	21 June 1922	14 February 1924	
General Sir Thomas Morland	30 June 1922	21 May 1925 †	
General Sir George Milne	31 July 1923	31 July 1927	
Lieutenant-General Sir George Barrow	14 February 1924	14 February 1928	
General Sir Walter Congreve	29 March 1924	28 February 1927 †	
Lieutenant-General Sir John Shea	31 May 1924	31 May 1928	
General Sir Alexander Godley	22 May 1925	22 May 1929	
General Sir John Du Cane	26 April 1926	26 April 1930	
General Sir Walter Braithwaite	14 March 1927	1 March 1931	
General Sir Philip Chetwode	31 July 1927	31 July 1931	
Lieutenant-General Sir Andrew Skeen	14 February 1928	26 April 1929	
General Sir Alexander Cobbe, Indian Army	31 May 1928	29 June 1931 †	
General Sir Robert Cassels, Indian Army	26 April 1929	9 June 1933	
General Sir John Asser	22 May 1929	9 August 1930	
General Sir Charles Harington	26 April 1930	26 April 1934	
General Sir Robert Whigham	9 August 1930	1 March 1931	
General Sir David Campbell	1 March 1931	1 March 1935	
General Sir Archibald Montgomery-Massingberd	1 March 1931	1 March 1935	
General Sir Norman MacMullen, Indian Army	29 June 1931	12 September 1935	
General Sir William Thwaites	31 July 1931	1 October 1933	Extra A.D.C. General from 1 October 1933 until 31 July 1935.
General Sir Kenneth Wigram, Indian Army	9 June 1933	6 June 1936	
General Sir Percy Radcliffe	1 October 1933	9 February 1934 †	
General Sir Cyril Deverell	10 February 1934	15 May 1936	Promoted to field marshal.
General the Honourable Sir John Gathorne-Hardy	26 April 1934	12 October 1937	
General Sir Alexander Wardrop, Indian Army	1 March 1935	12 October 1937	
General Sir John Burnett-Stuart	1 March 1935	26 April 1938	
General Sir Walter Leslie, Indian Army	12 September 1935	1 May 1936	
General Sir Henry ap Rhys Pryce, Indian Army	1 May 1936	1 April 1938	
General Sir George Jeffreys	15 May 1936	17 August 1938	
Lieutenant-General Sir John Coleridge, Indian Army	6 June 1936	6 June 1940	
General Sir Walter Kirke	12 October 1937	1 July 1940	
General Sir Edmund Ironside	12 October 1937	20 July 1940	Promoted to field marshal.
General Sir Douglas Baird, Indian Army	1 April 1938	1 April 1940	
General Sir William Bartholomew	26 April 1938	8 June 1940	
General Sir Charles Bonham-Carter	17 August 1938	17 August 1941	
General Sir Sydney Muspratt, Indian Army	1 April 1940	15 December 1941	
General Sir Roger Wilson, Indian Army	6 June 1940	15 May 1941	
General Sir Robert Gordon-Finlayson	8 June 1940	24 November 1941	
General Sir John Dill	1 July 1940	18 November 1941	Promoted to field marshal.
General the Viscount Gort	20 July 1940	20 July 1944	
General Sir Claude Auchinleck	15 May 1941	1 June 1946	Promoted to field marshal.
General Sir Archibald Wavell	17 August 1941	18 October 1943	Appointed Viceroy and Governor-General of India.
General Sir Walter Venning	18 November 1941	11 September 1942	
General Sir Henry Maitland Wilson	24 November 1941	29 December 1944	Promoted to field marshal.
General Sir Alan Hartley, Indian Army	15 December 1941	7 July 1944	
General Sir Alan Brooke	11 September 1942	26 June 1946	
General Sir George Giffard	18 October 1943	17 August 1946	
General Mosley Mayne, Indian Army	7 July 1944	1 March 1947	
General the Honourable Sir Harold Alexander	20 July 1944	5 April 1946	
General Sir Bernard Paget	13 October 1944	14 October 1946	Appointed aide-de-camp general (extra).
General Sir Richard O'Connor	5 April 1946	30 January 1948	
General Sir Charles Loyd	26 June 1946	23 April 1947	
General Sir Daril Watson	17 August 1946	19 August 1947	
General Sir Miles Dempsey	14 October 1946	22 August 1947	
General Sir Geoffry Scoones, Indian Army	1 March 1947	1 August 1949	
General Sir Edwin Morris	23 April 1947	15 November 1948	
General Sir Philip Christison	19 August 1947	27 June 1949	
General Sir Montagu Stopford	22 August 1947	6 July 1949	
General Sir John Crocker	30 January 1948	31 January 1951	
General Harry Crerar, Canadian Army	23 July 1948	c.1953	
General Sir Neil Ritchie	15 November 1948	30 August 1951	
General Sir Brian Robertson	27 June 1949	27 June 1952	
General Sir Evelyn Barker	6 July 1949	c.1950	
General Sir James Steele	c.1950	21 October 1950	
General Sir John Harding	21 October 1950	21 July 1953	Promoted to field marshal.
General Sir Frank Simpson	31 January 1951	31 January 1954	
General Sir Gerald Templer	30 August 1951	30 August 1954	
General Sir Ouvry Roberts	27 June 1952	26 June 1955	
General Sir Charles Keightley	21 July 1953	20 July 1956	
General Sir Richard Gale	31 January 1954	31 January 1957	
General Sir Cameron Nicholson	30 August 1954	29 November 1956	
General Sir George Erskine	26 June 1955	26 June 1958	
General Sir Robert Mansergh	20 July 1956	13 February 1959	
General Sir Charles Loewen	29 November 1956	14 August 1959	
General Sir Nevil Brownjohn	31 January 1957	29 November 1958	
General Sir Francis Festing	26 June 1958	1 September 1960	
General Sir Dudley Ward	29 November 1958	29 November 1961	
General Sir Hugh Stockwell	13 February 1959	13 February 1962	
General Sir Geoffrey Bourne	14 August 1959	29 April 1960	
General Sir James Cassels	29 April 1960	29 April 1963	
General Sir Cecil Sugden	1 September 1960	28 December 1961	
General Sir Richard Hull	29 November 1961	29 November 1964	
General Sir Richard Goodbody	28 December 1961	29 June 1963	
General Sir Gerald Lathbury	13 February 1962	25 February 1965	
General Sir Roderick McLeod	29 April 1963	30 January 1965	
General Sir Michael West	29 June 1963	21 September 1965	
General Sir William Stirling	29 November 1964	30 June 1966	
General Sir Charles Jones	30 January 1965	9 January 1967	
General Sir Rodney Moore	25 February 1965	18 October 1966	
General Sir Robert Bray	21 September 1965	21 September 1968	
General Sir Reginald Hewetson	30 June 1966	27 November 1967	
General Sir John Anderson	18 October 1966	27 February 1968	
General Sir Charles Richardson	9 January 1967	9 January 1970	
General Sir John Hackett	27 November 1967	1 October 1968	
General Sir Geoffrey Baker	27 February 1968	31 March 1971	Promoted to field marshal.
General Sir Alan Jolly	21 September 1968	27 October 1969	
General Sir Kenneth Darling	1 October 1968	11 November 1969	
General Sir Charles Harington	27 October 1969	6 February 1971	
General Sir Michael Carver	11 November 1969	11 November 1972	
General Sir Desmond Fitzpatrick	9 January 1970	9 January 1973	
General Sir John Mogg	6 February 1971	6 February 1974	
General Sir Antony Read	31 March 1971	2 March 1974	
General Sir Victor FitzGeorge-Balfour	11 November 1972	21 November 1973	
General Sir Peter Hunt	9 January 1973	9 January 1976	
General Sir Basil Eugster	21 November 1973	29 April 1974	
General Sir Thomas Pearson	6 February 1974	27 December 1974	
General Sir Cecil Blacker	2 March 1974	25 June 1976	
General Sir William Jackson	29 April 1974	29 April 1976	
General Sir Harry Tuzo	27 December 1974	27 December 1977	
General Sir John Gibbon	9 January 1976	27 May 1977	
General Sir John Sharp	29 April 1976	15 January 1977 †	
General Sir Roland Gibbs	25 June 1976	25 June 1979	
General Sir Frank King	15 January 1977	27 December 1978	
General Sir David Fraser	27 May 1977	5 February 1980	
General Sir Jack Harman	27 December 1977	27 December 1980	
General Sir Patrick Howard-Dobson	27 December 1978	24 April 1981	
General Sir Edwin Bramall	25 June 1979	31 July 1982	Promoted to field marshal.
General Sir Robert Ford	5 February 1980	7 April 1981	
General Sir William Scotter	27 December 1980	5 February 1981 †	
General Sir John Stanier	6 April 1981	10 July 1985	Promoted to field marshal.
General Sir Michael Gow	7 April 1981	7 April 1984	
General Sir Anthony Farrar-Hockley	24 April 1981	14 February 1983	
General Sir George Cooper	31 July 1982	26 May 1984	
General Sir Frank Kitson	14 February 1983	27 July 1985	
General Sir Thomas Morony	7 April 1984	11 November 1986	
General Sir Roland Guy	26 May 1984	7 February 1987	
General Sir Nigel Bagnall	10 July 1985	9 September 1988	Promoted to field marshal.
General Sir Edward Burgess	27 July 1985	2 October 1987	
General Sir David Mostyn	7 February 1987	10 February 1989	
General Sir John Chapple	2 October 1987	14 February 1992	
General Sir Charles Huxtable	9 September 1988	3 December 1990	
General Sir Robert Pascoe	10 February 1989	21 February 1991	
Lieutenant-General Sir David Ramsbotham	3 December 1990	13 July 1993	
General Sir Peter Inge	21 February 1991	21 April 1994	Promoted to field marshal.
General Sir John Waters	14 February 1992	22 March 1995	
General Sir Charles Guthrie	13 July 1993	4 May 2001	
General Sir John Wilsey	21 April 1994	24 June 1996	
General Sir Michael Rose	9 September 1995	31 August 1997	
General Sir Roger Wheeler	6 December 1996	7 August 2000	
General Sir Jeremy Mackenzie	17 March 1997	8 February 1999	
General Sir Michael Walker	1 September 1997	5 June 2006	
General Sir Alexander Harley	8 February 1999	7 August 2000	
General Sir Rupert Smith	7 August 2000	1 November 2001	
General Sir Samuel Cowan	7 August 2000	18 November 2002	
General Sir Mike Jackson	1 November 2001	14 November 2006	
General Sir Timothy Granville-Chapman	6 January 2003	29 October 2009	
General Sir Richard Dannatt	5 June 2006	1 September 2009	
General Sir Redmond Watt	8 January 2007	30 April 2008	
General Sir David Richards	12 June 2008	2 January 2014	
General Sir Nicholas Houghton	1 October 2009	24 January 2017	
General Sir Peter Wall	30 October 2009	5 September 2014	
General Sir Nick Parker	29 October 2010	25 May 2013	
General Sir Richard Barrons	19 April 2013	5 April 2016	
General Sir Nicholas Carter	5 September 2014	1 December 2021	
General Sir Christopher Deverell	5 April 2016	10 May 2019	
General Sir Mark Carleton-Smith	11 June 2018	13 June 2022	
General Sir Patrick Sanders	6 May 2019	16 June 2024	
General Sir James Hockenhull	23 May 2022	3 March 2026	
General Dame Sharon Nesmith	17 May 2024		
General Sir Roland Walker	16 June 2024		

† : Date of death.
