= De Pass =

De Pass, also spelled DePass or De Passe, is a surname. Notable people with the surname include:

- Eliot de Pass (1851–1937), English merchant
- Alfred Aaron de Pass (1861–1952), South African businessman
- Frank de Pass (1887–1914), English recipient of the Victoria Cross
- Morris DePass (1895–1981), American Army officer
- Suzanne de Passe (born 1946), American television, music and film producer

== See also ==
- de Passe Jones Entertainment, American entertainment company
- Linha de Passe, 2008 Brazilian drama film
