= Hugh Trefusis Brassey =

British Army officer and magistrate (1915–1990)

- Born: 5 October 1915
- Died: 10 April 1990 (aged 74)
- Military career
- Allegiance: United Kingdom
- Branch: British Army
- Rank: Colonel
- Units: Royal Scots Greys; Royal Wiltshire Yeomanry; Yeomen of the Guard
- Conflicts: World War II
- Awards: Knight Commander of the Royal Victorian Order; Order of the British Empire; Military Cross; Croix de guerre
- Other work: Justice of the Peace; Lord Lieutenant of Wiltshire

Colonel Sir Hugh Trefusis Brassey KCVO OBE MC JP DL (5 October 1915 – 10 April 1990) was a British soldier and magistrate.

== Background ==
Born on 5 October 1915, Brassey was the son of Lieutenant-Colonel Edgar Hugh Brassey, grandson of Henry Arthur Brassey, and his wife Margaret Harriet Trefusis, daughter of Hon. Walter Rodolph Trefusis. Brassey was educated at Eton College and at the Royal Military College, Sandhurst.

== Career ==
He joined in the Royal Scots Greys as second lieutenant in 1935 During the Second World War, he was involved in the Syria-Lebanon Campaign in 1941 and the Battle of El Alamein in the following year. He took part in the Salerno Landings of 1943 and also in the Normandy Landings of 1944. In 1944, Brassey was decorated with the Military Cross and the French Croix de Guerre. After the war, he was transferred as lieutenant-colonel to the Royal Wiltshire Yeomanry in 1955.

In the New Year Honours 1959 Brassey was appointed as an Officer of the Order of the British Empire. He was appointed aide-de-camp to Queen Elizabeth II in 1964, a post he held for five years. In 1974, Brassey was appointed colonel of the Royal Scots Dragoon Guards.

He entered the Yeomen of the Guard as exon in 1964 and became its ensign in 1970. Brassey was promoted to adjutant and clerk of the cheque the year thereafter and finally to lieutenant in 1979. Following his retirement in 1985, he was made as a Knight Commander of the Royal Victorian Order.

He was High Sheriff of Wiltshire in 1959 and represented the county also as Justice of the Peace. Having been already Deputy Lieutenant from 1956 and Vice Lord Lieutenant from 1968, Brassey was nominated Lord Lieutenant of Wiltshire in 1981, an office he held until 1989. He was invested a Knight of the Venerable Order of Saint John in 1982.

== Family ==
On 18 July 1939, he married Joyce Patricia Kingscote (1917–2006), daughter of Captain Maurice John Kingscote, and had by her three daughters and two sons. He died on 10 April 1990.

Military offices
Preceded by Ralph Younger	Colonel of the Royal Scots Dragoon Guards; 1974–1978	Succeeded by Sir John Stanier
Honorary titles
Preceded by The Lord Margadale	Lord Lieutenant of Wiltshire; 1981 – 1989	Succeeded by Sir Roland Gibbs
