= Brownjohn =

Brownjohn is a surname. Notable people with the surname include:

- Alan Brownjohn (1931–2024), English poet and novelist
- John Brownjohn (1929–2020), British literary translator
- Nevil Brownjohn (1897–1973), British Army general
- Robert Brownjohn (1925–1970), American graphic designer
