= John Stanier =

John Stanier may refer to:

- John Stanier (British Army officer) (1925–2007), Chief of the General Staff (United Kingdom), 1982–1985
- John Stanier (drummer) (born 1968)
- John Stanier (cinematographer), cinematographer of Fame (1980 film)
