= 71st Infantry Brigade (United Kingdom) =

71st Brigade 71st Infantry Brigade 71st Independent Infantry Brigade 71st Infantry Brigade
- Insignia of the 53rd (Welsh) Division, Second World War
- Active: 1915-1919; 1940-1946
- Disbanded: 1946
- Country: United Kingdom
- Branch: British Army
- Type: Infantry
- Size: Brigade

71st Brigade (First World War)
- Operations: Western Front

71st Infantry Brigade (Second World War)
- Operations: Battle of Normandy * Battle of Falaise * Battle of the Bulge * Operation Veritable

The 71st Infantry Brigade was an infantry brigade formation of the British Army that saw active service during both the First and Second World Wars.

== First World War ==
The 71st Brigade was raised following the outbreak of war, from men volunteering for Kitchener's New Armies. It was initially part of the 24th Division, but on 11 October 1915 it transferred to the 6th Division, swapping with the 17th Brigade. It fought on the Western Front.

=== Order of battle ===
- 9th (Service) Battalion, Norfolk Regiment
- 9th (Service) Battalion, Suffolk Regiment (disbanded in February 1918)
- 8th (Service) Battalion, Bedfordshire Regiment (moved to 16th Brigade in November 1915)
- 11th (Service) Battalion, Essex Regiment (moved to 18th Brigade in October 1915)
- 2nd Battalion, Sherwood Foresters (Nottinghamshire and Derbyshire Regiment) (from 18th Brigade October 1915)
- 1st Battalion, Leicestershire Regiment (from 16th Brigade in November 1915)
- 71st Machine Gun Company, Machine Gun Corps (formed 14 March 1916, moved to 6th Battalion, Machine Gun Corps 1 March 1918)
- 71st Trench Mortar Battery (formed April 1916)

== Second World War ==
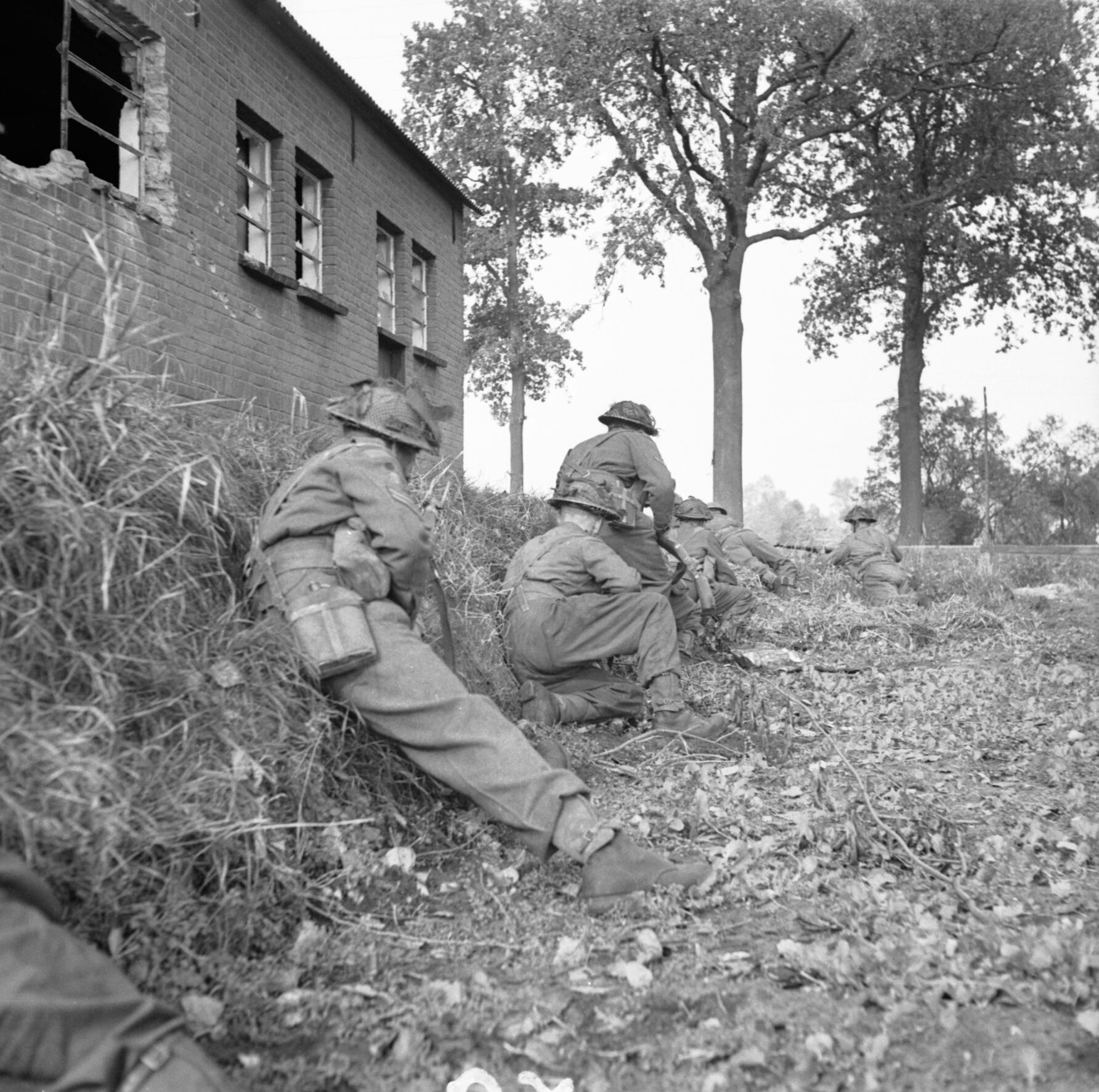
Infantry of the 1st Battalion, Oxfordshire and Buckinghamshire Light Infantry in forward positions outside Heike on the road to 's-Hertogenbosch, Holland, 23 October 1944.

The 71st Infantry Brigade was reformed in the Second World War on 28 November 1940, by the redesignation of the Headquarters of 3rd London Infantry Brigade. On 12 December it was redesignated 71st Independent Infantry Brigade. The new 71st Brigade consisted of three infantry battalions raised earlier in the year specifically for war service, the 7th Bn King's Own Royal Regiment (Lancaster) and 8th and 9th Bn York and Lancaster Regiment. The battalions were all transferred to British India on 14 June 1942 and the brigade ceased to be independent and was again redesignated 71st Infantry Brigade. On the same date, the battalions in the brigade were replaced by the 1st Battalion (a Regular unit) of the East Lancashire Regiment and 1st (also Regular) and 13th (a war service battalion) Highland Light Infantry (the 13th were later replaced by 1st Ox and Bucks). Again on 14 June brigade became part of the 42nd Armoured Division, previously the 42nd (East Lancashire) Infantry Division.

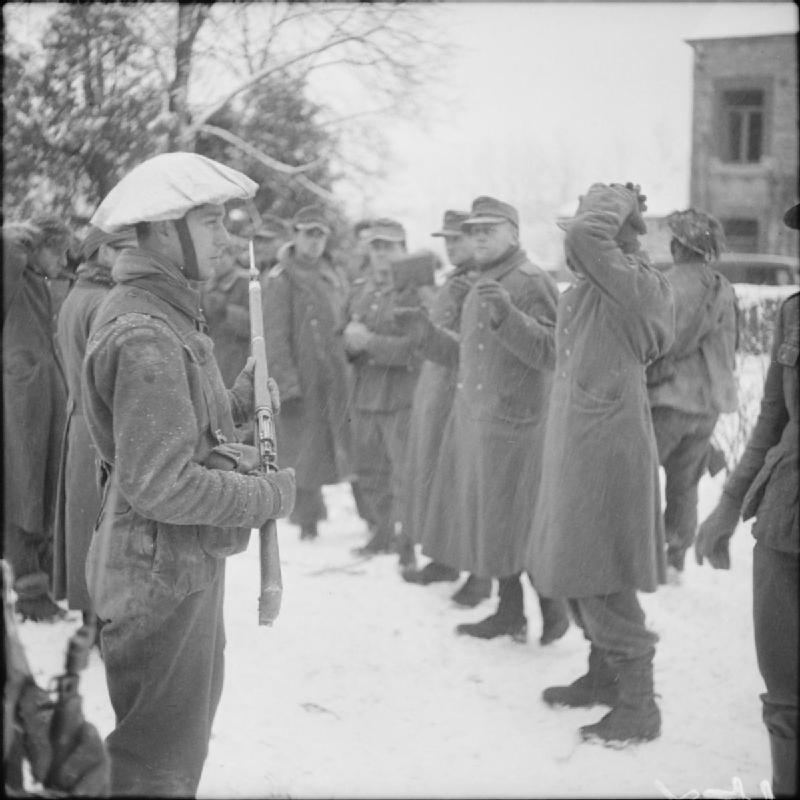
Men of the 1st Battalion, Ox and Bucks Light Infantry, 53rd (Welsh) Division, guarding German prisoners in the village of Marche in Belgium, 7 January 1945.

In late 1943 42nd Armoured was disbanded and the 71st Brigade replaced the 31st Tank Brigade and became part of the 53rd (Welsh) Infantry Division. The brigade, commanded by Brigadier Valentine Blomfield until September 1944, fought with the division throughout the Campaign in North West Europe, before finally being disbanded in March 1946. It was commanded by Brigadier D.H. Haugh.

=== Order of battle ===
- 7th Battalion, King's Own Royal Regiment (Lancaster) (until 28 April 1942)
- 8th Battalion, York and Lancaster Regiment (until 8 May 1942)
- 9th Battalion, York and Lancaster Regiment (until 8 May 1942)
- 1st Battalion, East Lancashire Regiment (from 14 June 1942 to 26 August 1944)
- 1st Battalion, Highland Light Infantry (from 14 June 1942 to 17 August 1945)
- 13th Battalion, Highland Light Infantry (from 14 June to 30 July 1942)
- 1st Battalion, Oxfordshire and Buckinghamshire Light Infantry (from 30 July 1942)
- 4th (Denbighshire) Battalion, Royal Welch Fusiliers (from 5 August 1944)
- 1st Battalion, Royal Norfolk Regiment (from 17 August 1945)
