= Desmond Mangham =

British Army general

Major-General Desmond Mangham CB
- Born: 29 August 1924
- Died: 23 November 2014 (aged 90)
- Military career
- Allegiance: United Kingdom
- Branch: British Army
- Service years: 1943–1979
- Rank: Major-General
- Commands: 2nd Division; 3rd Regiment Royal Horse Artillery
- Conflicts: Second World War
- Awards: Companion of the Order of the Bath

Major-General William Desmond Mangham, CB (29 August 1924 – 23 November 2014) was a British Army officer who commanded the 2nd Division from 1974 to 1976.

== Military career ==
Educated at Ampleforth College, Mangham was commissioned into the Royal Artillery in 1943 during the Second World War. He became commanding officer of the 3rd Regiment Royal Horse Artillery in 1966. He was appointed Commander Royal Artillery for the 2nd Division in 1968, chief of staff for 1st (British) Corps in 1972 and General Officer Commanding 2nd Division in 1974. His last appointment was as Vice Quartermaster-General in 1976 before retiring in 1979.

In retirement Mangham became Director of the Brewer's Association. He died on 23 November 2014.

== Family ==
In 1960 Mangham married Susan Humfrey; they had two sons and two daughters.

Military offices
| Preceded by John Archer | General Officer Commanding 2nd Division; 1974–1976 | Succeeded by Frank Kitson |
