= Harold Redman =

British Army general

Lieutenant-General Sir Harold Redman KCB CBE
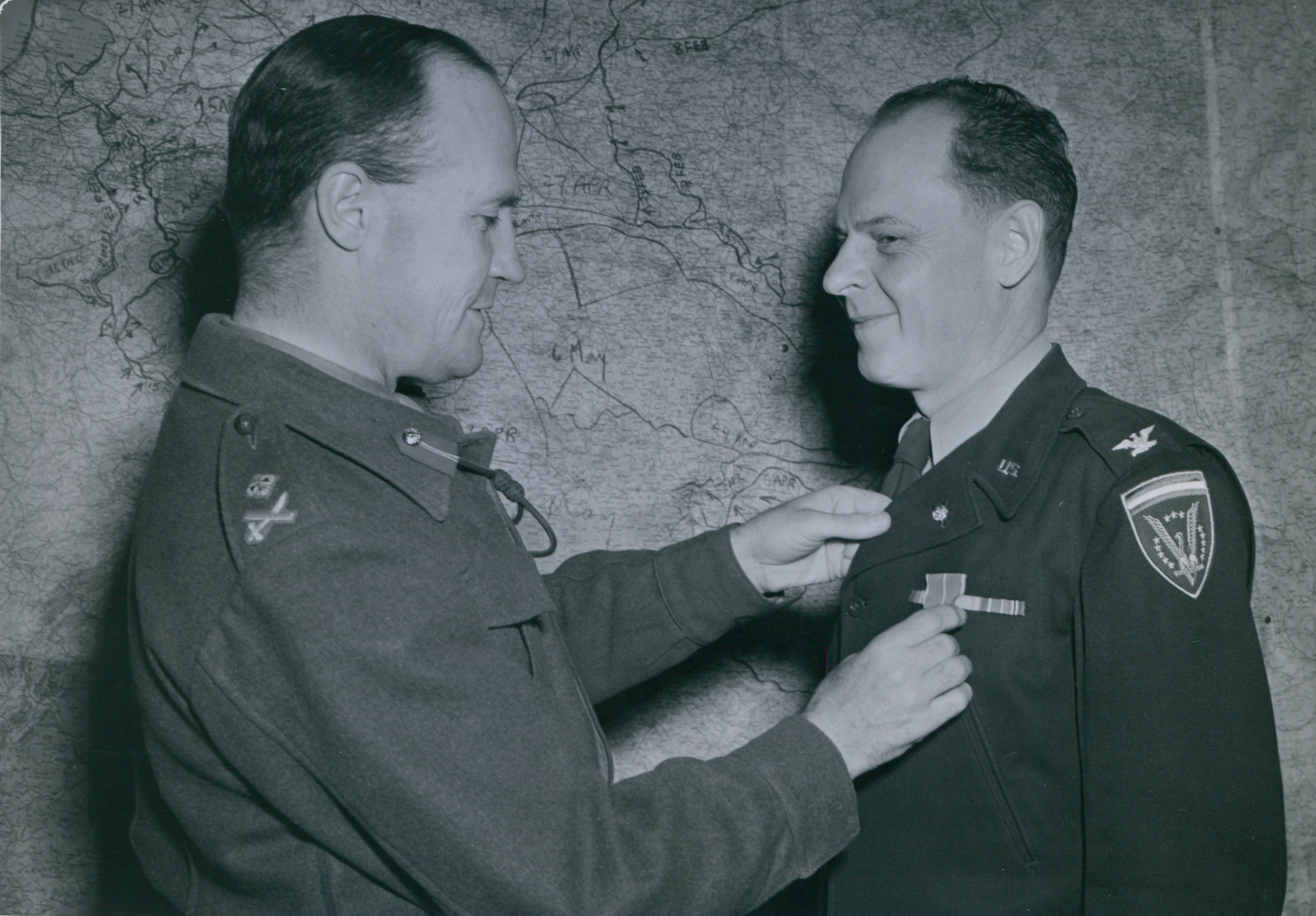
- Redman (left) presents an award to an American soldier
- Born: 25 August 1899
- Died: 1986 (aged 86–87)
- Military career
- Allegiance: United Kingdom
- Branch: British Army
- Service years: 1917–1958
- Rank: Lieutenant-General
- Service number: 15389
- Units: Royal Artillery; King's Own Yorkshire Light Infantry
- Commands: 10th Indian Motor Brigade; 151st Infantry Brigade; 7th Battalion King's Own Yorkshire Light Infantry
- Conflicts: First World War; North-West Frontier; Second World War
- Awards: Knight Commander of the Order of the Bath; Commander of the Order of the British Empire; Mentioned in Despatches; Commander of the Legion of Merit (United States)

Lieutenant-General Sir Harold Redman, KCB, CBE (25 August 1899 – 1986) was a senior British Army officer and Governor of Gibraltar.

== Military career ==
Redman was commissioned into the Royal Artillery 28 February 1917. He served in the First World War in France and Belgium during 1918 and later Germany.

He served in India and was the aide-de-camp to the general officer commanding Waziristan Force from 20 November 1923 to 19 October 1924, for which he was mentioned in despatches (London Gazette 13 March 1925).

He transferred to the King's Own Yorkshire Light Infantry in February 1929, while attending the Staff College, Camberley from 1929 to 1930, alongside fellow students such as Neil Ritchie, George Erskine, Ivor Hughes, Harold Freeman-Attwood, Herbert Lumsden.

He became a GSO2 at the War Office in London on 1 October 1932 and was an instructor at the Senior Officers' School at Sheerness in October 1937 before he moved on to be an instructor at the Staff College, Camberley, from 15 November 1938 to 13 August 1939.

He served on the staff at the War Office from 14 August 1939 to 2 July 1940.

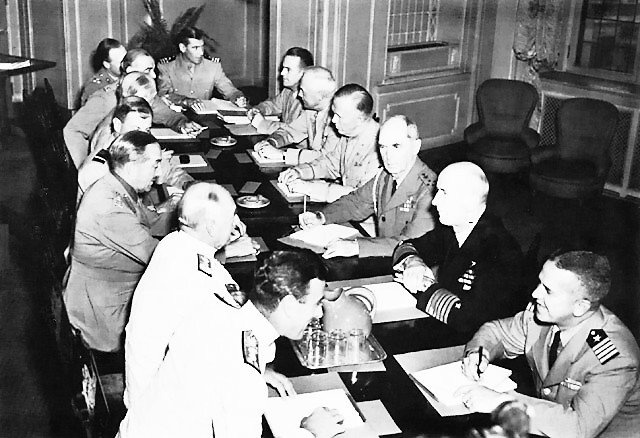
The Combined Chiefs of Staff during the Quebec Conference on 23 August 1943. Brigadier Harold Redman is seated seventh on the left.

He served in the Second World War, being appointed commanding officer of 7th Battalion King's Own Yorkshire Light Infantry in July 1940. Then in February 1941 he became commander 151st Infantry Brigade until 12 December 1941 which took him to North Africa, Cyprus and the Middle East.

He was made a brigadier on the General Staff of the British Eighth Army in North Africa from 13 December 1941 to 27 March 1942.

On 30 March 1942 he became commander of 10th Indian Motor Brigade until 1 March 1943, after which he went on to be British secretary to Combined Chiefs of Staff in Washington D.C. He was appointed deputy commander for the French Forces of the Interior in 1944 and deputy head of Supreme Headquarters of the Allied Expeditionary Force Mission to France later that year.

After the war he initially became head of the British Military Mission to France and then in 1946 he became chief of staff to Allied Land Forces South East Asia. He was made director of military operations at the War Office in 1948 and principal staff officer to the Supreme Allied Commander Europe in 1951.

He was made Vice-Chief Imperial General Staff in 1952 and Governor and Commander-In-Chief of Gibraltar in 1955. He retired in 1958.

In retirement he became the first director and secretary of the Wolfson Foundation in 1958.

== Bibliography ==
- Smart, Nick (2005). Biographical Dictionary of British Generals of the Second World War. Barnesley: Pen & Sword. ISBN 1844150496.

Military offices
Preceded by Sir Nevil Brownjohn	Vice Chief of the Imperial General Staff; 1952–1955	Succeeded by Sir William Oliver
Government offices
Preceded by Sir Gordon MacMillan	Governor of Gibraltar; 1955–1958	Succeeded by Sir Charles Keightley
