= Valentine Blomfield =

British Army general (1898–1980)

Major-General Valentine Blomfield CB DSO
- Blomfield as colonel of the King's Own Royal Border Regiment in 1959
- Born: 29 March 1898
- Died: 11 January 1980 (aged 81)
- Relatives: David Blomfield (son)
- Military career
- Allegiance: United Kingdom
- Branch: British Army
- Service years: 1916−1954
- Rank: Major-General
- Service number: 13747
- Units: Border Regiment; King's Own Royal Border Regiment
- Commands: 71st Infantry Brigade; 42nd (Lancashire) Division
- Conflicts: First World War; Waziristan campaign Second World War
- Awards: Companion of the Order of the Bath; Distinguished Service Order; Mentioned in dispatches (2)

Major-General Valentine Blomfield, CB, DSO (29 March 1898 – 11 January 1980) was a British Army officer.

== Military career ==
Blomfield entered the Royal Military College, Sandhurst, from where he was commissioned into the Border Regiment on 7 April 1916. He saw action during the Western Front during the First World War and was the deployed to India during Waziristan campaign.

Remaining in the army during the interwar period, he attended the Staff College, Camberley from 1934 to 1935. Following this, he was appointed as a Staff Captain with the 43rd (Wessex) Infantry Division, a Territorial Army (TA) formation, from June 1936. On 1 August 1938 he was promoted to major.

He was deployed to France with the British Expeditionary Force in September 1939 during the Second World War. After being promoted to the local rank of brigadier on 16 March 1942, he served at the War Office in London, where he was Deputy Director of Staff Duties until December 1943. After this, he later served as commander of 71st Infantry Brigade, part of the 53rd (Welsh) Infantry Division, in France during the Battle of Normandy in the summer of 1944, for which he was appointed a Companion of the Distinguished Service Order. He continued to command the brigade until September 1944 when he was wounded. On 1 August 1945 he was promoted to the local rank of major-general.

After being appointed a Companion of the Order of the Bath in the 1947 New Year Honours he became Director of Personal Services at the War Office in September 1947 and General Officer Commanding 42nd (Lancashire) Division in October 1950 before retiring in December 1953.

He was honorary colonel of the Border Regiment from 1952 to 1959 and then honorary colonel of the King's Own Royal Border Regiment from 1959 to 1961.

Military offices
Preceded by Vyvyan Evelegh	GOC 42nd (Lancashire) Division; 1950–1953	Succeeded by William Stratton
