= John Cowley (British Army officer) =

Recipient of the George Cross

Lieutenant-General Sir John Cowley GC KBE CB
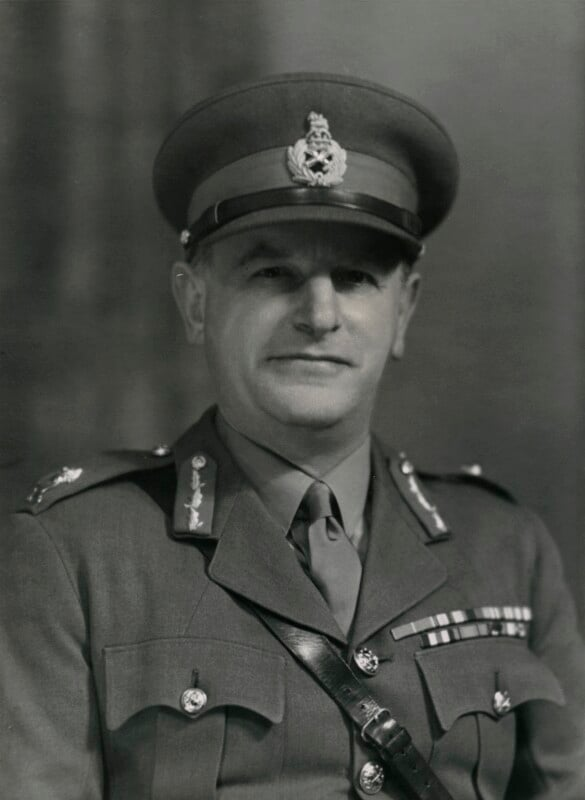
- Cowley in 1953
- Born: 20 August 1905; Mussoorie, United Provinces of Agra and Oudh, British Raj (present-day Uttarakhand, India)
- Died: 7 January 1993 (aged 87); Brockenhurst, Hampshire, England
- Military career
- Allegiance: United Kingdom
- Branch: British Army
- Service years: 1925–1962
- Rank: Lieutenant-General
- Service number: 33330
- Unit: Royal Engineers
- Commands: Master-General of the Ordnance (1960–62)
- Conflicts: Second World War
- Awards: George Cross; Knight Commander of the Order of the British Empire; Companion of the Order of the Bath; Mentioned in Despatches; Knight Commander of the Order of Orange-Nassau (Netherlands)

Lieutenant-General Sir John Guise Cowley, GC, KBE, CB (20 August 1905 – 7 January 1993) was a British Army officer and George Cross recipient who reached high rank in the 1950s.

== Military career ==
Cowley was born at Mussoorie, North India, the son of an army chaplain. Returning to England as a baby, his early years were spent in a Dorset village, where his father was the rector. Educated at Wellington College and the Royal Military Academy, Woolwich, Cowley was commissioned into the Royal Engineers on 3 September 1925. He was promoted to lieutenant on 3 September 1927.

Posted to India, by 1935 Cowley was attached to the 16th Army Troops Company, 2nd Queen Victoria's Own Madras Sappers and Miners (now the Madras Engineer Group of the Indian Army) in Quetta. Here he was awarded the Albert Medal, subsequently exchanged for the George Cross, for his actions in rescuing survivors from the ruins of a collapsed hospital during the Quetta earthquake of May 1935.

Lieutenant Cowley and his party were the first to start relief work at the Civil Hospital where the walls of all the wards had collapsed, bringing down the roofs intact on the inmates on whom the debris of the walls had already fallen. At first, the men were too few in number to tear off the roofs, so they raised them up for short periods whilst Lieutenant Cowley crawled under them and dragged out survivors from their beds. The survivors were pre-earthquake hospital patients and mostly quite helpless. Lieutenant Cowley lifted many men in his arms, regardless of the warning that they were suffering from all manner of diseases. Had it not been for the work of this officer and the excellent example shown by him to his men, very many less men would have been saved alive.

Cowley was promoted to captain on 3 September 1936. From 16 November 1936 to 17 December 1938, he was an instructor at Woolwich. He served in the Second World War in the Middle East, Italy and North West Europe. He was promoted to major on 3 September 1942, and ended the war as a war-substantive lieutenant colonel and temporary brigadier, with promotion to colonel on 10 March 1949. In 1953 he became Chief of Staff at Headquarters Eastern Command, advancing to major-general in January 1954. He was then appointed Vice Quartermaster-General in 1956, Controller of Munitions at the Ministry of Supply in 1957 on promotion to lieutenant-general, and appointment to Master-General of the Ordnance in 1960; he retired in 1962.

Cowley's honours included appointment as an Officer of the Order of the British Empire (OBE) in 1943 and Commander (CBE) in 1946; Knight Commander of the Order of Orange-Nassau in 1947; Companion of the Order of the Bath (CB) in 1954; and promotion to Knight Commander of the Order of the British Empire (KBE) in 1958. He exchanged his Albert Medal for the George Cross in 1971. He was also Colonel Commandant of the Royal Pioneer Corps from 1961 to 1968.

In retirement, Cowley served as a director of a number of companies; as president of the New Forest Preservation Society and as chairman of the governors of Wellington College. He died of heart disease aged 87 on 7 January 1993 at Brockenhurst, Hampshire.

== Family ==
In 1941 Cowley married Irene Sybil Millen and together they had one son and three daughters.

Military offices
Preceded by Vacant	Master-General of the Ordnance; 1960–1962	Succeeded by Sir Cecil Sugden
