= Edwin Bramall =

British Army officer (1923–2019)

Field Marshal The Right Honourable The Lord Bramall KG GCB OBE MC JP DL
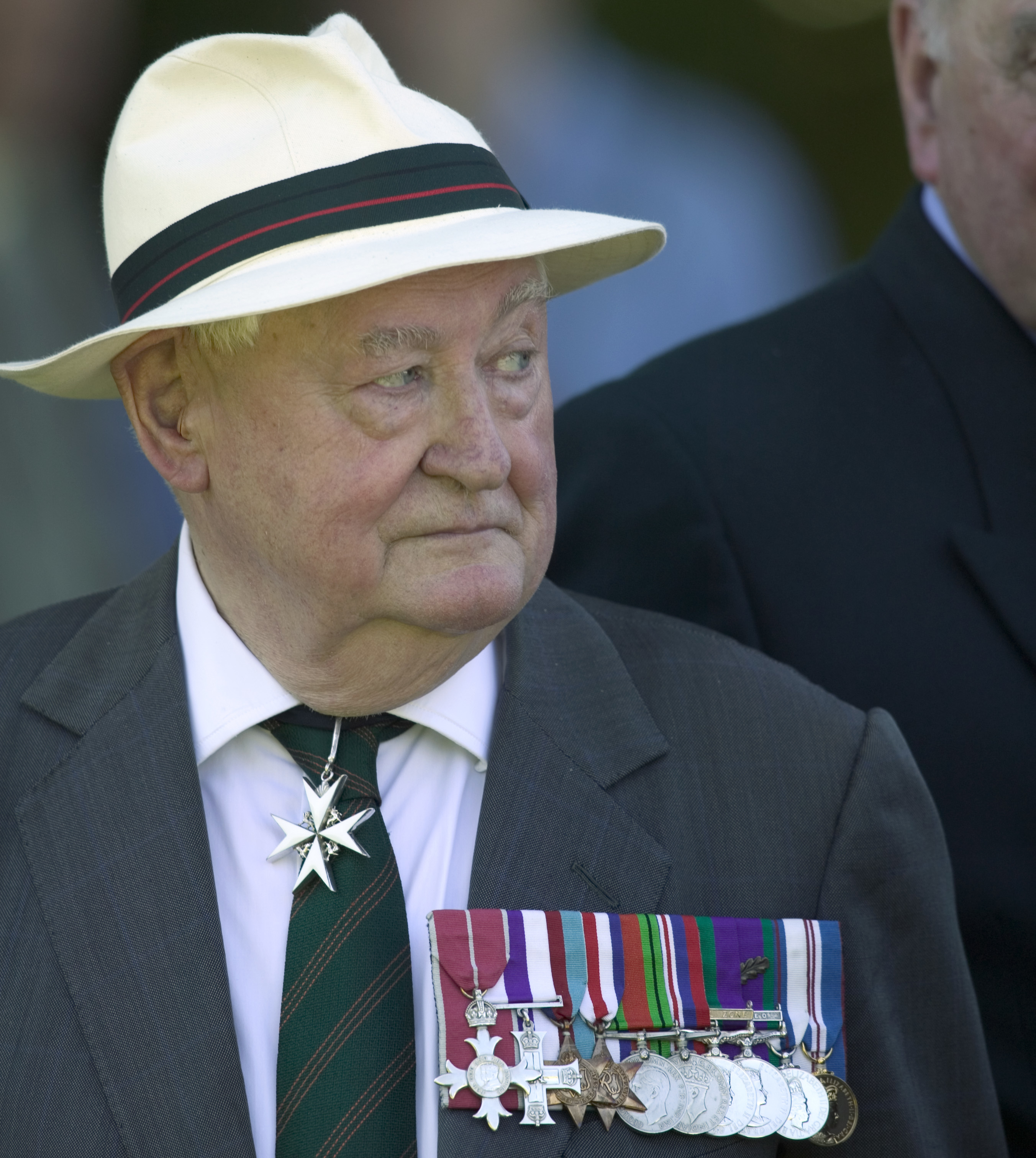
- Bramall in 2005
- Born: Edwin Noel Westby Bramall; 18 December 1923; Tonbridge, Kent, England
- Died: 12 November 2019 (aged 95); Crondall, Hampshire, England
- Military career
- Allegiance: United Kingdom
- Branch: British Army
- Service years: 1942–1985
- Rank: Field Marshal
- Service number: 277408
- Units: King's Royal Rifle Corps; Royal Green Jackets
- Commands: Chief of the Defence Staff; Chief of the General Staff; Land Forces; British Forces in Hong Kong; 1st Division; 5th (Airportable) Infantry Brigade; 2nd Battalion Royal Green Jackets
- Conflicts: Second World War; Indonesia–Malaysia confrontation Falklands War
- Awards: Knight Companion of the Order of the Garter; Knight Grand Cross of the Order of the Bath; Officer of the Order of the British Empire; Military Cross; Knight of the Order of St John; Mentioned in despatches
- Other work

Member of the House of Lords
- Lord Temporal
- Life peerage 9 February 1987 – 25 April 2013

Personal details
- Party: Crossbencher

Field Marshal Edwin Noel Westby Bramall, Baron Bramall (18 December 1923 – 12 November 2019), also known as "Dwin", was a British Army officer. He served as Chief of the General Staff, the professional head of the British Army, between 1979 and 1982, and as Chief of the Defence Staff, professional head of the British Armed Forces, from 1982 to 1985.

== Early life and family ==
Bramall was born on 18 December 1923 in Tonbridge, Kent, England, the son of Major Edmund Haselden Bramall (1889−1964) by his wife Katherine Bridget Westby. He was educated at Eton College, where, among other accomplishments, he captained an undefeated first XI cricket team.

In 1949 he married Dorothy Avril Wentworth Vernon, by whom he had one son and one daughter. His elder brother Ashley Bramall was a barrister, Labour politician and Leader of the Inner London Education Authority.

== Military career ==
Bramall was commissioned as a second lieutenant in the King's Royal Rifle Corps on 22 May 1943, during the Second World War. He took part in the Normandy landings in June 1944 and served with the 2nd Battalion of his regiment in Northwest Europe during the later stages of the war, receiving the Military Cross on 1 March 1945, shortly before the end of World War II in Europe.

Bramall was promoted to lieutenant on 18 June 1946 and served in the occupation of Japan from 1946, before becoming an instructor at the School of Infantry in 1949. Promoted to captain on 18 December 1950, he was stationed in the Middle East from 1953 and was then promoted to major on 18 December 1957. Continuing his military career, he served two years as an instructor at the Staff College, Camberley, from 1958, and then was appointed to serve on Lord Mountbatten's staff in 1963.

The Normandy landings, in which Bramall took part, during the Second World War

Appointed an Officer of the Order of the British Empire in the 1965 New Year Honours, and promoted to lieutenant colonel on 25 January 1965, he was appointed commanding officer of the 2nd Green Jackets, The King's Royal Rifle Corps: the battalion was deployed to Borneo during the Indonesia–Malaysia confrontation in the first half of 1966 where his actions earned him a mention in despatches. He was given command of the 5th (Airportable) Infantry Brigade in November 1967 with promotion to brigadier on 31 December 1967.

Bramall was made general officer commanding the 1st Division on 6 January 1972, with the substantive rank of major general from 6 April 1972, Commander of British Forces in Hong Kong with the rank of lieutenant general on 1 December 1973 and appointed a Knight Commander of the Order of the Bath in the 1974 New Year Honours. He went on to be Commander-in-Chief, UK Land Forces on 15 May 1976 and was promoted to full general on 25 June 1976.

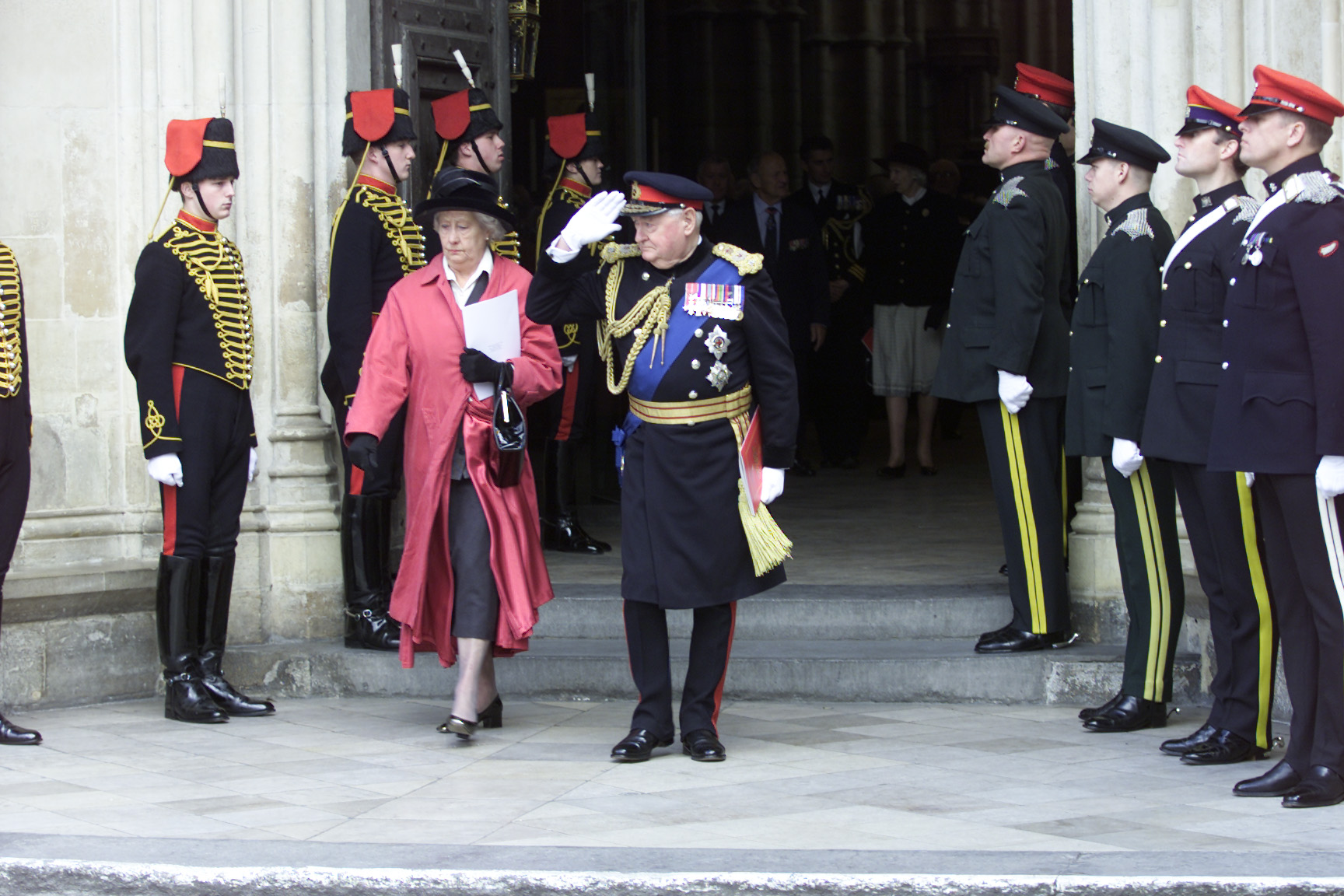
Bramall at Westminster Abbey in 2002

He was appointed Vice-Chief of the Defence Staff (Personnel and Logistics) on 20 March 1978, advanced to Knight Grand Cross of the Order of the Bath in the 1979 New Year Honours, before being made ADC General to Elizabeth II on 26 June 1979 and appointed Chief of the General Staff on 14 July 1979. In this role he strongly supported the plan in May 1982 to land troops at San Carlos Water and then advance rapidly from those positions at the early stages of the Falklands War.

Bramall was promoted to field marshal on 1 August 1982, and appointed Chief of the Defence Staff on 1 October 1982. In this capacity he developed the concept of the "Fifth Pillar" pulling together the activities of defence attachés to form a structure for intervention in smaller countries. He retired in November 1985. He was also colonel of the 3rd Battalion the Royal Green Jackets from December 1973, colonel of the 2nd King Edward VII's Own Gurkha Rifles (The Sirmoor Rifles) from 14 September 1976 and colonel commandant of the Special Air Service from 19 May 1985.

== Later career ==
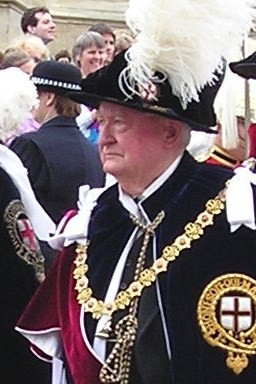
Lord Bramall in the robes of a Knight Companion of the Order of the Garter, June 2006

Following his retirement from active military duty Bramall served as Lord Lieutenant of Greater London from 1986 to 1998. He was invested as a Knight Companion of the Garter in 1990. He served as president of the Marylebone Cricket Club (MCC) in 1988. and was an Honorary Life Vice President of the MCC. His other interests included painting and travel and he was a vice-president of the welfare organisation SSAFA Forces Help.

An April 2012 interview of Bramall

Bramall was created a life peer as Baron Bramall, of Bushfield in the County of Hampshire in 1987. Bramall spoke out in the House of Lords against the involvement of the United Kingdom in the Second Iraq War warning that "unlike naked aggression, terrorism cannot be defeated by massive military means" but by "competent protection and positive diplomacy".

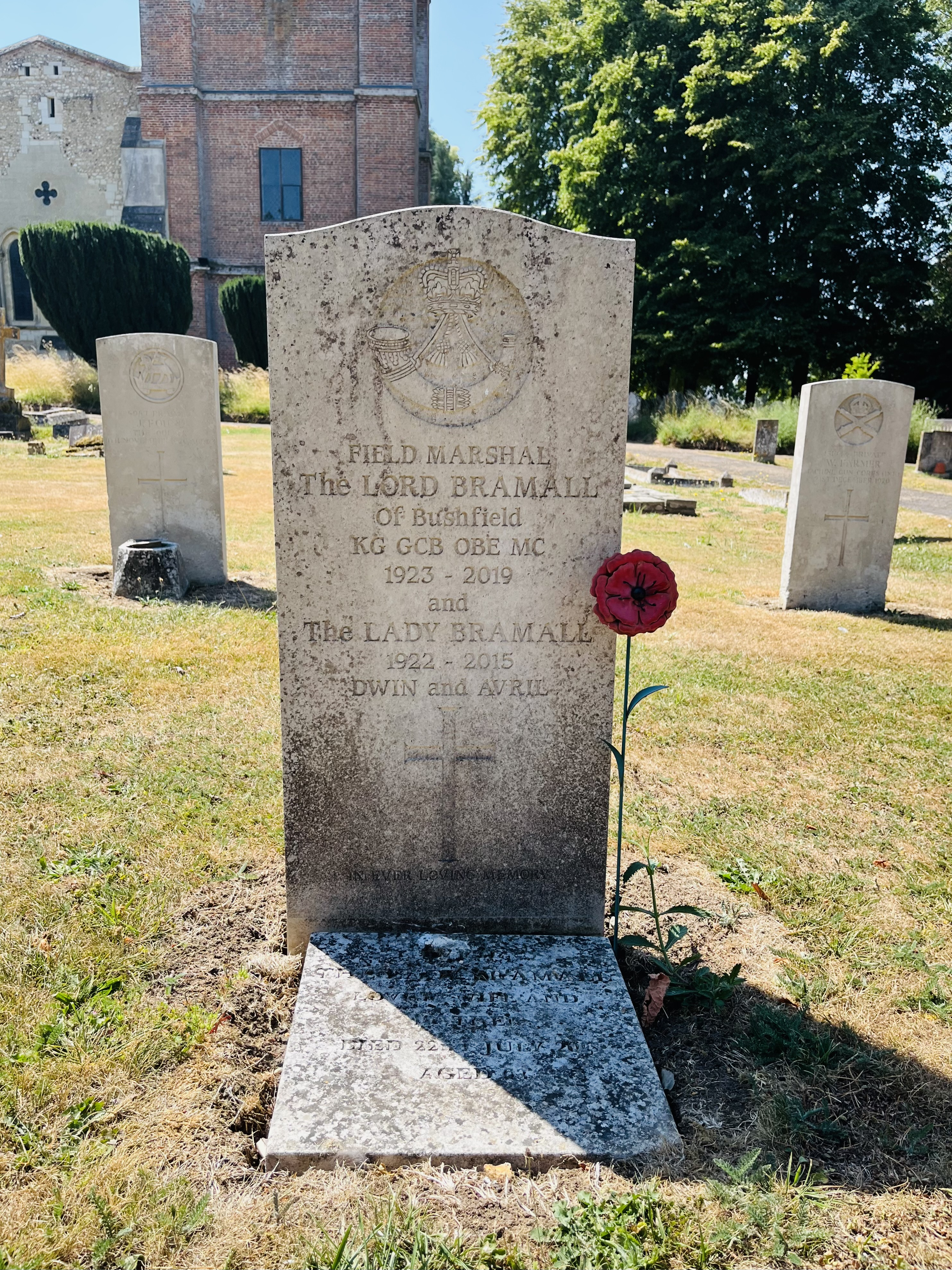
The grave of Edwin Bramall in the churchyard of All Saints Church in Crondall in Hampshire in 2026

On 27 August 2006 it was reported that Bramall, then aged 82, hit Lord Janner of Braunstone, then 78, after Bramall made what witnesses claim were a series of "anti-Israel" comments during an argument over the Lebanon conflict. Janner sought the advice of fellow peers about how and whether to make a formal complaint against Bramall, before deciding to accept an apology after which Janner said the matter was resolved.

On 25 April 2013 Bramall retired from service in the House of Lords. He died at the age of 95 on 12 November 2019, at his home in Crondall, Hampshire.

== Operation Midland ==
Bramall was one of several senior establishment figures targeted by convicted perjurer Carl Beech: following fabricated complaints made by Beech officers of the Metropolitan Police searched Bramall's home near Farnham on 4 March 2015 as part of the Operation Midland child sexual abuse investigation. Bramall released a statement after the search, saying: "Categorically, never have I had a connection or anything to do with the matters being investigated." On 30 April 2015, under the same investigation, Lord Bramall attended a police station in Surrey by appointment. While officers interviewed him for two hours, they did not charge or arrest him.

On 15 January 2016, the police confirmed that there was insufficient evidence to bring any charges and he would face no further action. Bramall's wife Lady Bramall died in July 2015, without knowing that he would not be charged. In October 2016, after what The Guardian described as a "chorus of calls" for an official apology to Lord Bramall, the Metropolitan Police Commissioner Sir Bernard Hogan-Howe apologised to Bramall.

On 1 September 2017, it was reported that the Metropolitan Police had paid substantial compensation to Bramall for having raided his home "after accepting that the searches had been unjustified and should never have taken place."

Beech was subsequently arrested and committed to stand trial on 12 counts of perverting the course of justice and one count of fraud in May 2019; he was convicted on all charges, and in July 2019 was sentenced to 18 years imprisonment. The court was told that "immeasurable distress" had been caused to those falsely accused as well as "obvious reputational damage". Bramall said of the ordeal: "I can honestly say however I was never as badly wounded in all my time in the military as I have been by the allegations made by [Beech] that formed the basis of Operation Midland."

== Arms ==
Coat of arms of Edwin Bramall
| Notes Baron Bramall since 1987 Coronet A coronet of a Baron Crest Statant lion barry Or and Azure supporting a UK Field Marshal’s Baton erect proper. Torse Mantling Or and Sable. Escutcheon Per fess embattled Sable and Or between three Stafford knots a lion rampant all counterchanged. Supporters Dexter: A Malayan Tiger holding in the dexter paw a Kukri, all proper. Sinister: a Chinese Dragon proper, holding in the sinister claw a Maltese Cross Vert. Motto PERSTA ET PROESTA; Latin: "Stand fast and step ahead" Orders The Order of the Garter. The collar as Grand Cross Knight of the Order of the Bath. The badge as Officer of the Order of the British Empire. Banner Heraldic banner of Baron Bramall, Knight Companion of the Garter, as shown in St George's Chapel, Windsor Castle. Symbolism The arms are based on those previously used by his family and by others of similar name. The Stafford knots refer to probable ancestors from Staffordshire. The embattled division of the shield refers to his military career. The supporters represent his service in Malaysia and Hong Kong. The green Maltese cross represents his position as colonel commandant 3rd Battalion Royal Green Jackets. The kukri represents his position as colonel 2nd Gurkhas. The striped (barry) lion in the crest refers to the coat of arms of the Manners (Duke of Rutland) family, from whom his wife claims descent. |

== Bibliography ==
- Heathcote, Tony (1999). The British Field Marshals 1736–1997. Pen and Sword Books. ISBN 0-85052-696-5.
- Tillotson, Major-General Michael (2006). The Fifth Pillar: the life and philosophy of the Lord Bramall K.G. Sutton Publishing. ISBN 0-7509-4239-8.
- Tillotson, Major-General Michael (2005). Dwin Bramall: The Authorised Biography of Field Marshal The Lord Bramall KG, GCB, OBE, MC. Sutton Publishing. ISBN 978-0750942386.

Military offices
| Preceded by Jack Harman | GOC 1st Division; 1972–1973 | Succeeded by David Alexander-Sinclair |
| Preceded by Sir Richard Ward | Commander of British Forces in Hong Kong; 1973–1976 | Succeeded by Sir John Archer |
| Preceded by Sir Roland Gibbs | C-in-C, UK Land Forces; 1976–1978 | Succeeded by Sir John Archer |
| Preceded by Sir Anthony Morton | Vice-Chief of the Defence Staff; 1978–1979 | Succeeded by Sir Patrick Howard-Dobson |
| Preceded by Sir Roland Gibbs | Chief of the General Staff; 1979–1982 | Succeeded by Sir John Stanier |
| Preceded by Sir Terence Lewin | Chief of the Defence Staff; 1982–1985 | Succeeded by Sir John Fieldhouse |
Honorary titles
| Preceded by The Baroness Phillips | Lord Lieutenant of Greater London; 1986–1998 | Succeeded by Peter Imbert |
