= James Glover (British Army officer) =

British Army general (1929–2000)

General Sir James Glover KCB MBE DL
- Born: 25 March 1929
- Died: 4 June 2000 (aged 71)
- Military career
- Allegiance: United Kingdom
- Branch: British Army
- Service years: 1949−1987
- Rank: General
- Service number: 403365
- Units: Royal Artillery; Rifle Brigade (The Prince Consort's Own)
- Commands: Land Forces (1985–1987); 19 Air Portable Brigade (1974–1975); 3rd Battalion Royal Green Jackets (1970–1971)
- Conflicts: Malayan Emergency; Operation Banner
- Awards: Knight Commander of the Order of the Bath; Member of the Order of the British Empire

General Sir James Malcolm Glover (25 March 1929 – 4 June 2000) was a senior British Army officer who served as Commander-in-Chief, Land Forces, from 1985 to 1987.

== Army career ==
Educated at Wellington College, Jimmy Glover, as he was generally known, was commissioned into the Royal Artillery in 1949. He transferred to the Rifle Brigade in 1956 and served with the brigade during the Malayan Emergency. He was commanding officer of the 3rd Battalion Royal Green Jackets from 1970 to 1971. He then went on to command 19 Air Portable Brigade from 1974 to 1975. He was Commander of Land Forces in Northern Ireland from 1979 to 1980. He was then Deputy Chief of Defence Staff (Intelligence) from 1981 to 1983 and Vice Chief of the General Staff from 1983 to 1985. He served as the Commander-in-Chief, Land Forces from 1985 to 1987 when he retired.

Glover was appointed a Knight Commander of the Order of the Bath (KCB) in the 1981 Birthday Honours.

== Later career ==
In retirement he was a Director of BP and Chairman of Royal Armouries International plc. He died in 2000, aged 71.

In 1988 in a BBC documentary by journalist Peter Taylor, Glover was asked by Taylor if the Provisional IRA could be militarily defeated to which Glover replied "In no way, can or will the Provisional Irish Republican Army ever be defeated militarily."

Military offices
Preceded by Sir Roy Halliday	Deputy Chief of Defence Staff (Intelligence); 1981–1983	Succeeded by Sir Michael Armitage
Preceded by Sir Thomas Morony	Vice Chief of the General Staff; 1983–1985	Post abolished
Preceded by Sir Frank Kitson	Commander-in-Chief, Land Forces; 1985–1987	Succeeded by Sir John Chapple
