= William Oliver (British Army officer) =

British Army general and diplomat (1901–1981)

Lieutenant-General Sir William Oliver GBE KCB KCMG
- Born: William Pasfield Oliver; 8 September 1901; Teddington, Middlesex, England
- Died: 26 February 1981 (aged 79)
- Military career
- Allegiance: United Kingdom
- Branch: British Army
- Service years: 1920–1957
- Rank: Lieutenant-General
- Service number: 18260
- Unit: Queen's Own Royal West Kent Regiment
- Commands: British Forces in Berlin; 31st Independent Infantry Brigade; 70th (Young Soldiers) Battalion, Welch Regiment
- Conflicts: Second World War
- Awards: Knight Grand Cross of the Order of the British Empire; Knight Commander of the Order of the Bath; Knight Commander of the Order of St Michael and St George

Lieutenant-General Sir William Pasfield Oliver, GBE, KCB, KCMG (8 September 1901 – 26 February 1981) was a senior British Army officer who served as Vice Chief of the Imperial General Staff from 1955 to 1957.

== Early life ==
Oliver was born in Teddington, Middlesex, the son of Royal Navy captain Pasfield Victor Oliver and Charlotte Winifred Richards. He was educated at King's College School, Cambridge, Radley College, and the Royal Military College, Sandhurst.

== Military career ==
After passing out from Sandhurst, Oliver was commissioned into the Queen's Own Royal West Kent Regiment on 24 December 1920. After being promoted to lieutenant on 24 December 1922, he became adjutant of his regiment in 1927 and, after being promoted to captain on 1 January 1931, went on to be an instructor at the Army School of Physical Training at Aldershot in 1931. He attended the Staff College, Camberley from 1934 to 1935. He then went out to India as a staff captain in 1936 and then became a General Staff Officer (GSO) in 1937. He was promoted to major on 1 August 1938.

He served in the Second World War as a lieutenant colonel on the staff of the Tactical School in 1940 before becoming a general staff officer at Southern Command in 1940. He was appointed commanding officer of 70th Battalion, Welch Regiment in 1941 and then became a general staff officer with responsibility for operations at Eastern Command in 1942. He was deputy director of Military Operations at the War Office later in 1942 and then brigadier on the General Staff at 9th Army HQ in the Middle East from 1943. He was made director of Military Operations for Middle East Land Forces in 1944 and then returned to his post as brigadier on the General Staff at 9th Army HQ in the Middle East in 1944. He became chief of staff to General Sir Bernard Paget at General Headquarters, Middle East Command, in 1945. On 3 August 1945 Oliver was promoted to the acting rank of major-general.

After the war he became commander 31st Independent Infantry Brigade, part of British Army of the Rhine, from 1948 and Chief Army Instructor at the Imperial Defence College from 1949. He became chief of staff at Eastern Command in 1951 and principal staff officer to the High Commissioner in the Federation of Malaya in 1953. He was made Commandant of the British Sector in Berlin in 1954 and Vice Chief of the Imperial General Staff in 1955. He retired in 1957.

He was principal staff officer to the Secretary of State for Commonwealth Relations from 1957 to 1959 and British High Commissioner to Australia from 1959 to 1965. Finally he was UK Commissioner General for Expo 67 in Montreal. He was also a member of a committee set up in 1968 to review arrangements for Rhodesian passports following the Unilateral Declaration of Independence by Prime Minister Ian Smith in 1965.

Military offices
| Preceded by Sir Charles Coleman | Commandant, British Sector in Berlin; 1954–1955 | Succeeded by Robert Cottrell-Hill |
| Preceded by Sir Harold Redman | Vice Chief of the Imperial General Staff; 1955–1957 | Succeeded by Sir William Stratton |
Diplomatic posts
| Preceded by The Lord Carrington | High Commissioner to Australia; 1959–1965 | Succeeded by Sir Charles Johnston |
