= Thomas Morony =

British Army general

General Sir Thomas Morony KCB OBE
- Born: 23 September 1926; Portsmouth, Hampshire
- Died: 27 May 1989 (aged 62); Hampshire, England
- Burial place: Yetminster, Dorset, England
- Military career
- Allegiance: United Kingdom
- Branch: British Army
- Service years: 1947–1986
- Rank: General
- Service number: 376437
- Commands: Vice Chief of the General Staff; Royal Military College of Science
- Awards: Knight Commander of the Order of the Bath; Officer of the Order of the British Empire

General Sir Thomas Lovett Morony, KCB, OBE (23 September 1926 – 27 May 1989) was a British Army officer who reached high office in the 1980s.

== Military career ==
Morony was commissioned into the Royal Artillery in 1947. His first senior appointment was as Director of the Royal Artillery in 1975. He was then appointed, in 1978, Commandant of the Royal Military College of Science. In 1980 he was made Vice Chief of the General Staff, and in 1983 he was appointed UK Military Representative to NATO.

Morony was also Colonel Commandant of the Royal Artillery from 1978, and of the Royal Horse Artillery from 1982. He was ADC General to the Queen from 1984 to 1986.

Military offices
| Preceded by Marston Tickell | Commandant of the Royal Military College of Science; 1978–1980 | Succeeded by Richard Vincent |
| Preceded by Sir John Stanier | Vice Chief of the General Staff; 1980–1983 | Succeeded by Sir James Glover |
| Preceded by Sir Anthony Morton | UK Military Representative to NATO; 1983–1986 | Succeeded by Sir Michael Knight |
Honorary titles
| Preceded by Sir Harry Tuzo | Master Gunner, St. James's Park; 1983–1988 | Succeeded by Sir Martin Farndale |
