= Henry Kitson =

Royal Navy officer (1877–1952)

Vice-Admiral Sir Henry Kitson KBE CB
- Portrait by Walter Stoneman, 1918
- Born: Henry Karslake Kitson; June 22, 1877; Highweek, Devon, England
- Died: February 19, 1952 (aged 74); Farnham, Surrey, England
- Military career
- Allegiance: United Kingdom
- Branch: Royal Navy
- Service years: 1891–1933; 1940–1942
- Rank: Vice-Admiral
- Commands: 3rd Battle Squadron; Portsmouth Dockyard
- Conflicts: World War I World War II
- Awards: Knight Commander of the Order of the British Empire; Companion of the Order of the Bath

Vice-Admiral Sir Henry Karslake Kitson KBE CB (22 June 1877 – 19 February 1952) was a Royal Navy officer who commanded the 3rd Battle Squadron.

== Naval career ==
Kitson joined the Royal Navy in 1891 and served in World War I. He was made Commander of 3rd Battle Squadron in 1929 and then Admiral Superintendent of Portsmouth Dockyard in 1931 before retiring as a vice-admiral in 1933. He was appointed a Companion of the Order of the Bath in the 1929 Birthday Honours and a Knight Commander of the Order of the British Empire in the 1935 Birthday Honours.

He also served in World War II as Flag Officer, Coast of Cornwall from 1940 until 1942.

== Personal life ==
In 1926, he married Marjorie de Pass, daughter of Sir Eliot Arthur de Pass. His brother-in-law Frank de Pass was the first Jewish recipient of the Victoria Cross.

They had two sons, including Sir Frank Kitson.
