= Frank Kitson =

British Army general (1926–2024)

General Sir Frank Kitson GBE KCB MC & Bar DL
- Born: Francis Edward Kitson; 15 December 1926; Kensington, London, England
- Died: 2 January 2024 (aged 97); Yelverton, Devon, England
- Military career
- Allegiance: United Kingdom
- Branch: British Army
- Service years: 1946–1985
- Rank: General
- Service number: 362061
- Units: Rifle Brigade (The Prince Consort's Own); Royal Green Jackets
- Commands: Land Forces; Staff College, Camberley; 2nd Division; 39 Airportable Brigade
- Conflicts: Mau Mau Uprising; Malayan Emergency; The Troubles
- Awards: Knight Grand Cross of the Order of the British Empire; Knight Commander of the Order of the Bath; Military Cross & Bar

General Sir Francis Edward Kitson (15 December 1926 – 2 January 2024) was a British Army officer and writer on military subjects, notably low intensity operations. He rose to be Commander-in-Chief UK Land Forces from 1982 to 1985 and was aide-de-camp general to Queen Elizabeth II from 1983 to 1985.

== Early life and education ==
Kitson was the son of Vice Admiral Sir Henry Kitson and Marjorie de Pass, daughter of Sir Eliot Arthur de Pass. His uncle Frank de Pass was the first Jewish recipient of the Victoria Cross. Kitson was educated at Stowe School.

== Military career ==
Kitson joined the British Army as a second lieutenant on an emergency commission in the Rifle Brigade (The Prince Consort's Own) on 23 February 1946. He was appointed to a regular commission as a lieutenant on 10 April 1948 (with seniority from 15 December 1947), and promoted to captain on 15 December 1953. He was awarded the Military Cross (MC) on 1 January 1955 for service in the Mau Mau Uprising in Kenya, and was awarded a Bar to it on 23 May 1958, for service in the Malayan Emergency (also known as the Anti-British National Liberation War) the previous year. The citation for the Bar read:

The War Office, 23rd May, 1958.

The QUEEN has been graciously pleased to approve the following awards in recognition of gallant and distinguished services in Malaya for the period 31st August to 31st December, 1957:—

Bar to the Military Cross.

Captain (temporary Major) Frank Edward Kitson, M.C. (362061), The Rifle Brigade (Prince Consort's Own).

For exceptional skill and leadership as a Company Commander during jungle operations. By his devotion to duty he attained the virtual elimination of two communist party branches in a difficult area.

Kitson was appointed a Member of the Order of the British Empire (MBE) in the 1959 Birthday Honours. He was promoted major on 15 December 1960, brevet lieutenant-colonel on 1 July 1964, and to the substantive rank on 31 December 1966. He was appointed an Officer of the Order of the British Empire (OBE) in the 1968 New Year Honours. He was promoted colonel on 31 December 1969 (with seniority from 30 June 1969), and brigadier on 30 June 1970.

From September 1970, Kitson commanded 39 Airportable Brigade, which comprised eight (frequently changing) battalions on short four-month tours. A further brigade was usually attached as brigade reserve, but this could be employed elsewhere as required. In 1971 Kitson established the Military Reaction Force in Northern Ireland, a plainclothes army unit that sought intelligence on the IRA but is believed to have shot dead several unarmed Catholic civilians.

On 15 February 1972, he was promoted Commander of the Order of the British Empire (CBE) for his operational service in Northern Ireland the previous year. On 22 January 1976, he became General Officer Commanding 2nd Division, with the acting rank of major-general, with substantive promotion following on 5 April 1976 (and seniority from 2 June 1974), and leading its re-designation as an Armoured Division in Germany before stepping down on 28 February 1978. He was then Commandant of the Staff College, Camberley, 5 March 1978 – 18 January 1980. He was appointed Knight Commander of the Order of the Bath (KCB) in the 1980 New Year Honours. On 17 March 1980, he was appointed Deputy Commander-in-Chief UK Land Forces and Inspector General Territorial Army, with substantive promotion to lieutenant-general (and seniority backdated to 17 August 1979). He held those appointments until 30 May 1982, and then became Commander-in-Chief, UK Land Forces on 1 July 1982 with local rank of general.

As is traditional for senior officers of the British Army, Kitson held a number of more honorary positions: Colonel Commandant of 2nd Battalion, Royal Green Jackets from 1 January 1979 to 1 January 1987; Honorary Colonel to the University of Oxford Officer Training Corps from 21 July 1982 to 21 July 1987; and Aide-de-Camp General to the Queen from 14 February 1983 to 1985. In the 1985 New Year Honours he was promoted to Knight Grand Cross of the Order of the British Empire (GBE). He was appointed a Deputy Lieutenant of Devon on 19 June 1989.

=== Post-Northern Ireland ===
In retirement Kitson gave evidence to the Saville Inquiry into the events of Bloody Sunday in Northern Ireland.

On 27 April 2015, Kitson and the Ministry of Defence were sued for negligence and misfeasance in office by Mary Heenan, the widow of Northern Irish foreman Eugene "Paddy" Heenan, who was killed, with three other men, when a hand grenade was thrown into a vehicle carrying 15 workers to a Catholic school building site in Gilnahirk in loyalist East Belfast in 1973 by members of the Ulster Defence Association (UDA). The lawsuit claimed that Kitson was "liable personally for negligence and misfeasance in public office" due to the fact that he was supposedly "reckless as to whether state agents would be involved in murder".

== Controversies and inquiries ==
Kitson's counterinsurgency methods and command decisions in Kenya and Northern Ireland have been the subject of official inquiries, legal proceedings, and criticism from human rights groups, victims' families, and historians.

=== Mau Mau Uprising ===
During the Mau Mau Uprising in Kenya in the 1950s, Kitson developed "counter-gang" tactics, utilizing captured and turned insurgents to infiltrate and eliminate rebel groups. While awarded the Military Cross for his intelligence work, his operations took place during a wider British colonial crackdown later found to have involved widespread detention without trial and systemic abuse of detainees—claims that led to a 2013 UK government settlement with over 5,000 Kenyan claimants. Critics and anti-colonial commentators have argued that the irregular warfare methods Kitson helped pioneer in Kenya normalized extrajudicial practices that were later adapted for Northern Ireland.

=== Northern Ireland (1970–1972) ===
As commander of the 39 Airportable Brigade in Belfast from September 1970 to 1972, Kitson oversaw British Army operations during a period of escalating violence, including the introduction of internment without trial (Operation Demetrius) in August 1971.

- Ballymurphy and Bloody Sunday: Units under Kitson's overall brigade command, notably the 1st Battalion, Parachute Regiment (1 Para), were responsible for both the Ballymurphy massacre in August 1971—in which 10 civilians were shot dead (a 2021 coroner's inquest later ruled all victims were entirely innocent)—and Bloody Sunday in Derry on 30 January 1972, when 1 Para soldiers shot 26 unarmed civilians during a civil rights march, resulting in 14 deaths. Victims' advocacy groups, such as the Bloody Sunday Trust, have held Kitson directly responsible for fostering an aggressive operational climate and backing 1 Para. Giving evidence to the Saville Inquiry in 2002, Kitson defended the soldiers involved in Bloody Sunday as "experienced professionals" and rejected allegations that they acted like "thugs" or that he had planned to provoke an armed confrontation during the march.
- Military Reaction Force (MRF): In 1971, Kitson established the Military Reaction Force, a covert, plainclothes intelligence and counterinsurgency unit modeled on his "counter-gang" concepts. Subsequent investigations, including a 2013 BBC Panorama documentary, found that MRF operatives carried out drive-by shootings in Belfast that killed and wounded unarmed Catholic civilians.
- Allegations of collusion: Kitson's doctrinal emphasis on using proxy forces and covert intelligence led to civil legal action regarding state collusion with loyalist paramilitaries. In 2015, Mary Heenan—whose husband, Eugene Heenan, was killed by the Ulster Defence Association in 1973—sued Kitson and the Ministry of Defence, alleging that Kitson's policies were "reckless as to whether state agents would be involved in murder."

== Personal life ==
In 1962, Kitson married Elizabeth Spencer, whose father, Colonel Charles Spencer, was Colonel of the 12th Royal Lancers. Lady Kitson was appointed an OBE in the Queen's Birthday Honours List of June 2015, for her work with the Army Families Federation. They have three daughters: Catherine Alice, Rosemary Diana and Marion Ruth.

Kitson died at home in Yelverton, Devon on 2 January 2024, at the age of 97. Writing on his death, The Irish News described Kitson as a hate figure, and quoted the late SDLP founder Paddy Devlin as saying that Kitson "probably did more than any other individual to sour relations between the Catholic community and the security forces." The Relatives for Justice group released a statement to the Irish News that Kitson "did not see final justice in a court but the tenacity of Mary Heenan and families like hers ensured his deplorable actions and their victims will never be forgotten."

== In television drama ==
Frank Kitson is played by Rory Kinnear in the television drama series Say Nothing (2024) based on the book of the same name by Patrick Radden Keefe.

== Selected bibliography ==
Kitson wrote widely on gangs, counter-gangs and measures of deception, the use of defectors, and concepts such as pseudo-gangs and pseudo-operations.

=== Books ===
- Gangs and Counter-gangs. London: Barrie and Rockliff (1960).
- Low Intensity Operations: Subversion, Insurgency and Peacekeeping London: Faber and Faber (1971); Hamden, Con.: Archon Books (1974). ISBN 978-0208014733.
- Bunch of Five. London: Faber and Faber (1977).
- Warfare as a Whole (1987).
- Directing Operations. London: Faber and Faber (1989). ISBN 978-0571152445.
- Prince Rupert: Portrait of a Soldier. London: Constable & Robinson (1994). ISBN 978-0094737006.
- Prince Rupert: Admiral and General-at-sea. London: Constable & Robinson (1998). ISBN 978-0094798502. OCLC 39479520.
- Old Ironsides: The Military Biography of Oliver Cromwell. London: Weidenfeld & Nicolson (2004). ISBN 978-0297846888.
- When Britannia Ruled the Waves: The Heyday of the Royal Navy, Through the Paintings of Vice Admiral Sir Henry Kitson, KBE, CB (1877–1952). Halsgrove (2007). ISBN 978-1841145976.

=== Book contributions ===
- Foreword to Brush Fire Wars: Minor Campaigns of the British Army Since 1945 by Michael Dewar. New York: St. Martin's Press (1984) ISBN 0312106742; London: Robert Hale (1984) ISBN 0709196245. OCLC 10913533. (pp. 9–10)

=== Reports ===
- Future Developments in Belfast: By Commander 39 Airportable Brigade (4 December 1971)

== See also ==
- False flag operations

Military offices
Preceded by Desmond Mangham	GOC 2nd Division (Re-designated as 2nd Armoured Division in 1977); 1976–1978	Succeeded by Alexander Boswell
Preceded by John Stanier	Commandant of the Staff College, Camberley; 1978–1980	Succeeded by David Alexander-Sinclair
Preceded by Sir Peter Hudson	Deputy C-in-C UK Land Forces; 1980–1982	Succeeded by Sir Edward Burgess
Preceded by Sir John Stanier	C-in-C, UK Land Forces; 1982–1985	Succeeded by Sir James Glover
