= Vice Chief of the General Staff (United Kingdom) =

Former deputy head of the British Army

Vice Chief of the General Staff (VCGS) was the title of the deputy to the Chief of the General Staff, the professional head of the British Army. From 1940 until 1985 the Vice Chief was the second-ranking member of the General Staff and was a member of the Army Board.

== List of post-holders ==
The Vice Chiefs were as follows:

=== Vice Chief of the Imperial General Staff ===
- Lieutenant-General Sir John Dill April 1940 – 27 May 1940
- Lieutenant-General Sir Robert Haining 27 May 1940 – 19 May 1941
- Lieutenant-General Sir Henry Pownall 19 May 1941 – 5 December 1941
- Lieutenant-General Sir Archibald Nye 5 December 1941 – 1945
- Lieutenant-General Sir Frank Simpson 1946–1948
- Lieutenant-General Sir Gerald Templer 1948–1950
- Lieutenant-General Sir Nevil Brownjohn 1950–1952
- Lieutenant-General Sir Harold Redman 1952–1955
- Lieutenant-General Sir William Oliver 1955–1957
- Lieutenant-General Sir William Stratton 1957–1960
- Lieutenant-General Sir William Pike 1960–1963
- Lieutenant-General Sir Geoffrey Baker 1963–1966

=== Vice Chief of the General Staff ===
- Lieutenant-General Sir Desmond Fitzpatrick 1966–1968
- Lieutenant-General Sir Victor FitzGeorge-Balfour 1968–1970
- Lieutenant-General Sir Cecil Blacker 1970–1973
- Lieutenant-General Sir David Fraser 1973–1975
- Lieutenant-General Sir William Scotter 1975–1978
- Lieutenant-General Sir John Stanier 1978–1980
- Lieutenant-General Sir Thomas Morony 1980–1983
- Lieutenant-General Sir James Glover 1983–1985
