= John Archer (British Army officer) =

British Army general

General Sir John Archer KCB OBE
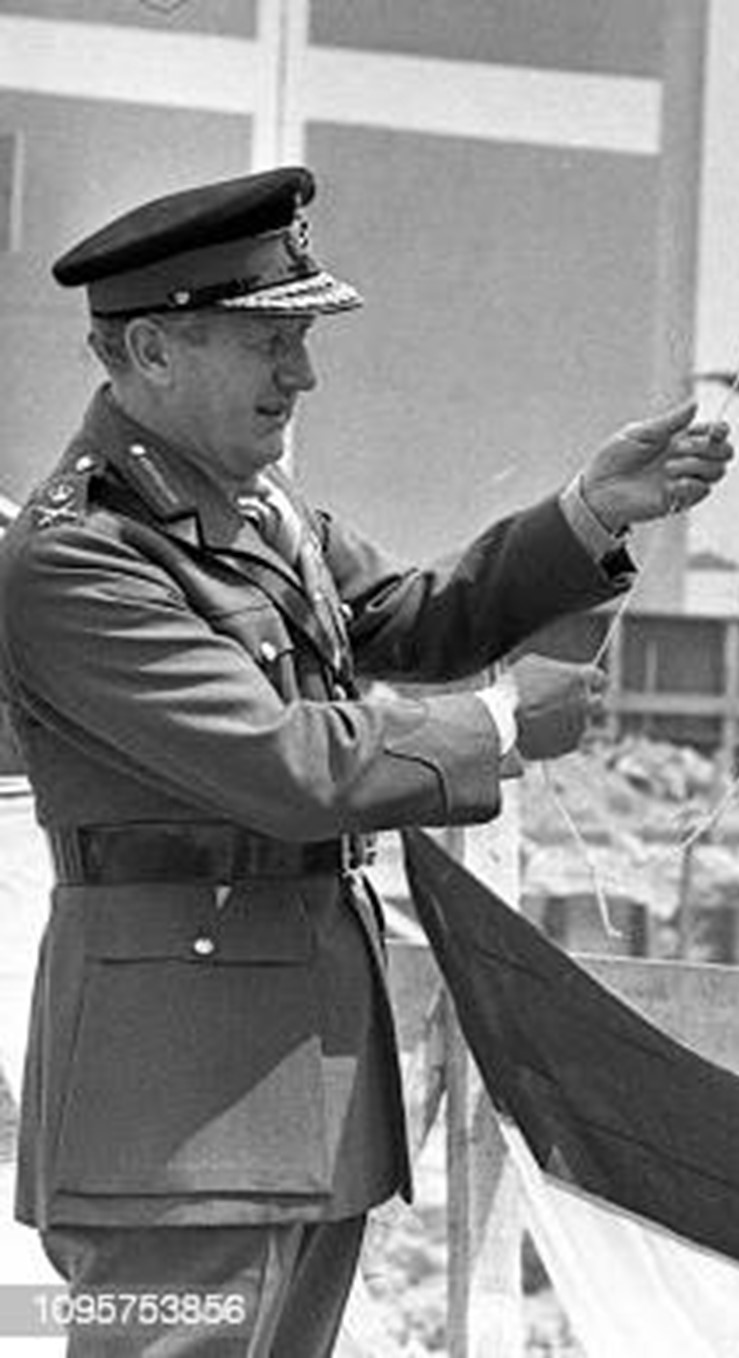
- Born: 12 February 1924
- Died: 12 March 1999 (aged 75)
- Military career
- Allegiance: United Kingdom
- Branch: British Army
- Service years: 1944–1980
- Rank: General
- Service number: 323707
- Units: Royal Norfolk Regiment; Devonshire and Dorset Regiment
- Commands: UK Land Forces; British Forces in Hong Kong; 2nd Division; 1st Battalion, Devonshire and Dorset Regiment
- Conflicts: Second World War; Malayan Emergency
- Awards: Knight Commander of the Order of the Bath; Officer of the Order of the British Empire

General Sir Arthur John Archer, KCB, OBE (12 February 1924 – 12 March 1999) was a senior officer of the British Army who served as Commander in Chief, UK Land Forces from 1978 to 1980.

== Military career ==
Educated at King's School, Peterborough, and St. Catharine's College, Cambridge, John Archer was commissioned into the Royal Norfolk Regiment in 1944. He transferred to the Devon and Dorset Regiment in 1946 and served with the regiment during the Malayan Emergency. He was commanding officer of the 1st Battalion Devon and Dorset Regiment from 1965 to 1967. He then went on to command British Land Forces in The Gulf from 1968 to 1969. He was General Officer Commanding 2nd Division from 1972 to 1974. He was then Director Army Staff Duties at the Ministry of Defence from 1974 to 1976 and Commander of British Forces in Hong Kong from 1976 to 1978. He served as the Commander in Chief, UK Land Forces, from 1978 to 1980 when he retired.

== Later career ==
In retirement, Archer was a Director of The Hongkong and Shanghai Banking Corporation and Chief Executive of The Royal Hong Kong Jockey Club.

Military offices
Preceded by Rollo Pain	General Officer Commanding 2nd Division; 1972–1974	Succeeded by Desmond Mangham
Preceded by Sir Edwin Bramall	Commander of British Forces in Hong Kong; 1976–1978	Succeeded by Sir Roy Redgrave
Preceded by Sir Edwin Bramall	Commander in Chief, UK Land Forces; 1978–1980	Succeeded by Sir Timothy Creasey
