= Roland Gibbs =

British Field Marshal (1921–2004)

Field Marshal Sir Roland Gibbs GCB CBE DSO MC KStJ DL
- Field Marshal Sir Roland Gibbs
- Born: 22 June 1921; Flax Bourton, Somerset, England
- Died: 31 October 2004 (aged 83); Wiltshire, England
- Military career
- Allegiance: United Kingdom
- Branch: British Army
- Service years: 1940–1979
- Rank: Field Marshal
- Service number: 114083
- Units: King's Royal Rifle Corps; Parachute Regiment
- Commands: Chief of the General Staff; UK Land Forces; 1st (British) Corps; 16 Parachute Brigade; 3rd Battalion, Parachute Regiment
- Conflicts: Second World War; Palestine Emergency; Aden Emergency
- Awards: Knight Grand Cross of the Order of the Bath; Commander of the Order of the British Empire; Companion of the Distinguished Service Order; Military Cross; Knight of the Venerable Order of Saint John
- Other work: Constable of the Tower of London (1985–1990)

Field Marshal Sir Roland Christopher Gibbs, GCB, CBE, DSO, MC, KStJ, DL (22 June 1921 – 31 October 2004) was Chief of the General Staff, the professional head of the British Army, from 1976 to 1979, and Lord Lieutenant of Wiltshire from 1989 to 1996. He saw active service in the Second World War and acted as chief of staff to the commander of the operation to evacuate all British troops and civilians from Aden during the Aden Emergency.

== Early life and education ==
Gibbs was born on 22 June 1921, the son of Major Guy Melvil Gibbs and Margaret Gibbs (née St John). He was educated at Eton College, an all-boys independent boarding school in Berkshire, and trained at the Royal Military College, Sandhurst.

== Military career ==
Gibbs was commissioned as a second lieutenant into the King's Royal Rifle Corps (KRRC) on 31 December 1939, almost four months after the British entry into the Second World War. He was not immediately involved in action, however, as he was deemed to be too young, and remained in the United Kingdom until he was posted to the 2nd Battalion, KRRC, then commanded by Lieutenant Colonel George Erskine and in the process of reforming after sustaining severe casualties during the siege of Calais. Gibbs, promoted to lieutenant on 1 July 1941, was to serve with the battalion for the rest of the war and was deployed to North Africa with his battalion in late 1941, he was awarded the Military Cross (MC) on 15 October 1942. After participating in the Second Battle of El Alamein, he took command of 'C Company' of his battalion in March 1943 and remained in that role for the rest of the war. Commanding his company throughout the final stages of the Tunisian campaign, he later took part in the Allied invasion of Italy and in the first few weeks of the Italian campaign. This was followed by action during the Normandy landings and the subsequent fighting in North West Europe until Victory in Europe Day (VE Day) in May 1945. Throughout this time, from D-Day to VE Day, one of his fellow officers was Edwin Bramall. Like Gibbs himself, Bramall was destined to reach the very highest ranks. He was appointed a Companion of the Distinguished Service Order (DSO) on 2 August 1945.

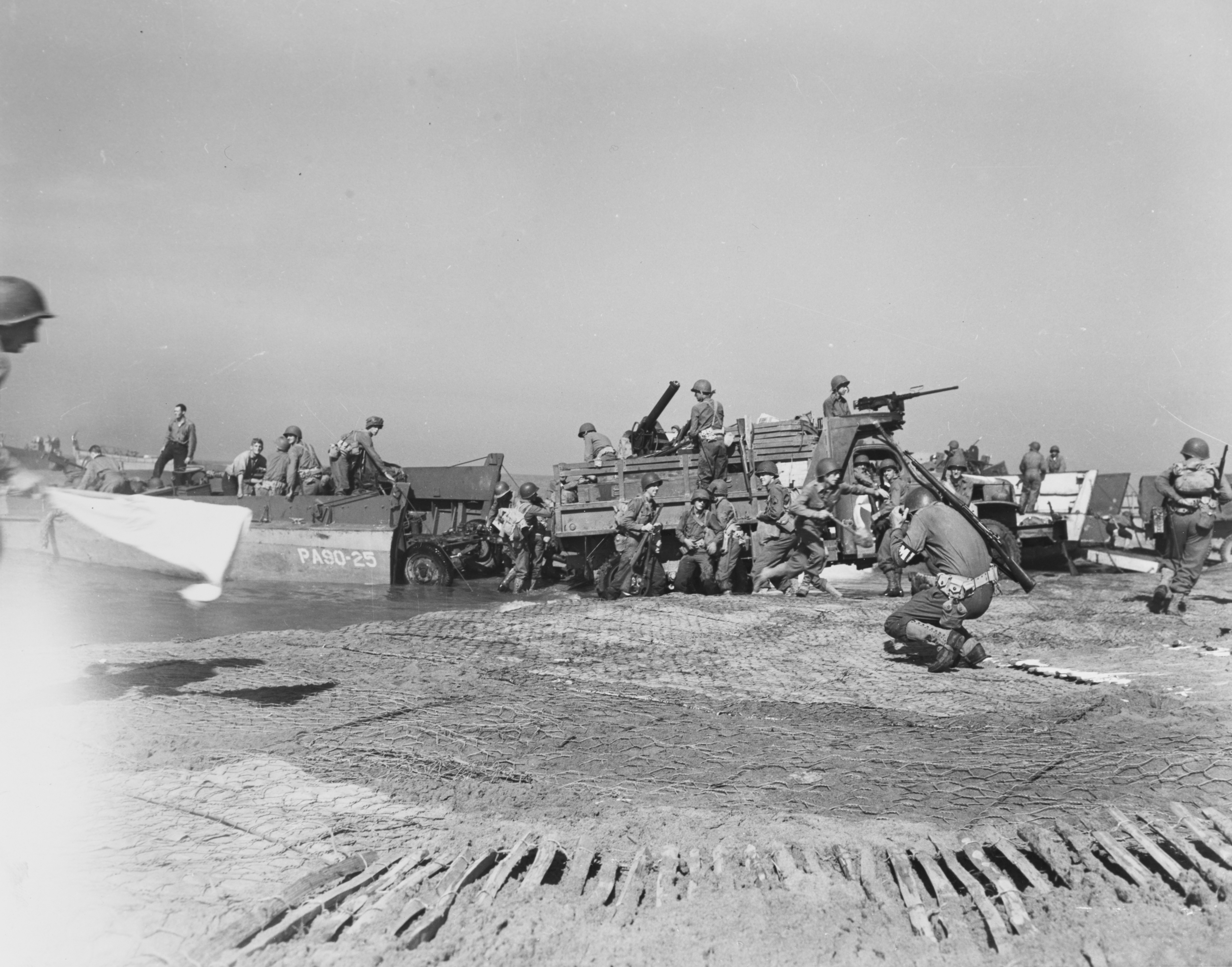
The Allied invasion of Italy, in which Gibbs took part, during the Second World War.

With the end of World War II in Europe, Gibbs was posted to the South-East Asian theatre where he served, briefly, as a General Staff Officer Grade 2 (GSO2) at the HQ of Allied Land Forces South-East Asia (ALFSEA). After the surrender of Japan, he was posted to the 5th Parachute Brigade as its brigade major. However, he returned to the 2nd KRRC after the 5th Para Brigade was disbanded. Gibbs was promoted to captain on 1 July 1946 and deployed to Palestine during the Palestine Emergency, serving with the 7th (Light Infantry) Parachute Battalion, part of the 6th Airborne Division (see the 6th Airborne Division in Palestine). He then became an instructor at the Royal Military Academy Sandhurst in December 1948. Promoted to major on 31 December 1952, he was posted as Brigade Major of 5th Infantry Brigade at Iserlohn in Germany and in 1957 he became a staff officer in Whitehall dealing with inter-service planning. In 1960 he was appointed commanding officer of 3rd Battalion, Parachute Regiment and in 1963, as a temporary brigadier, went on to command 16 Parachute Brigade which deployed that year to Cyprus in a peace keeping role. Promoted to colonel on 4 July 1964, he was posted to Aden in 1966 as chief of staff to Admiral Sir Michael Le Fanu who was commander of the operation to evacuate all British troops and civilians during the Aden Emergency. He was promoted to the substantive rank of brigadier on 6 December 1966 and appointed a Commander of the Order of the British Empire in the New Year Honours 1968.

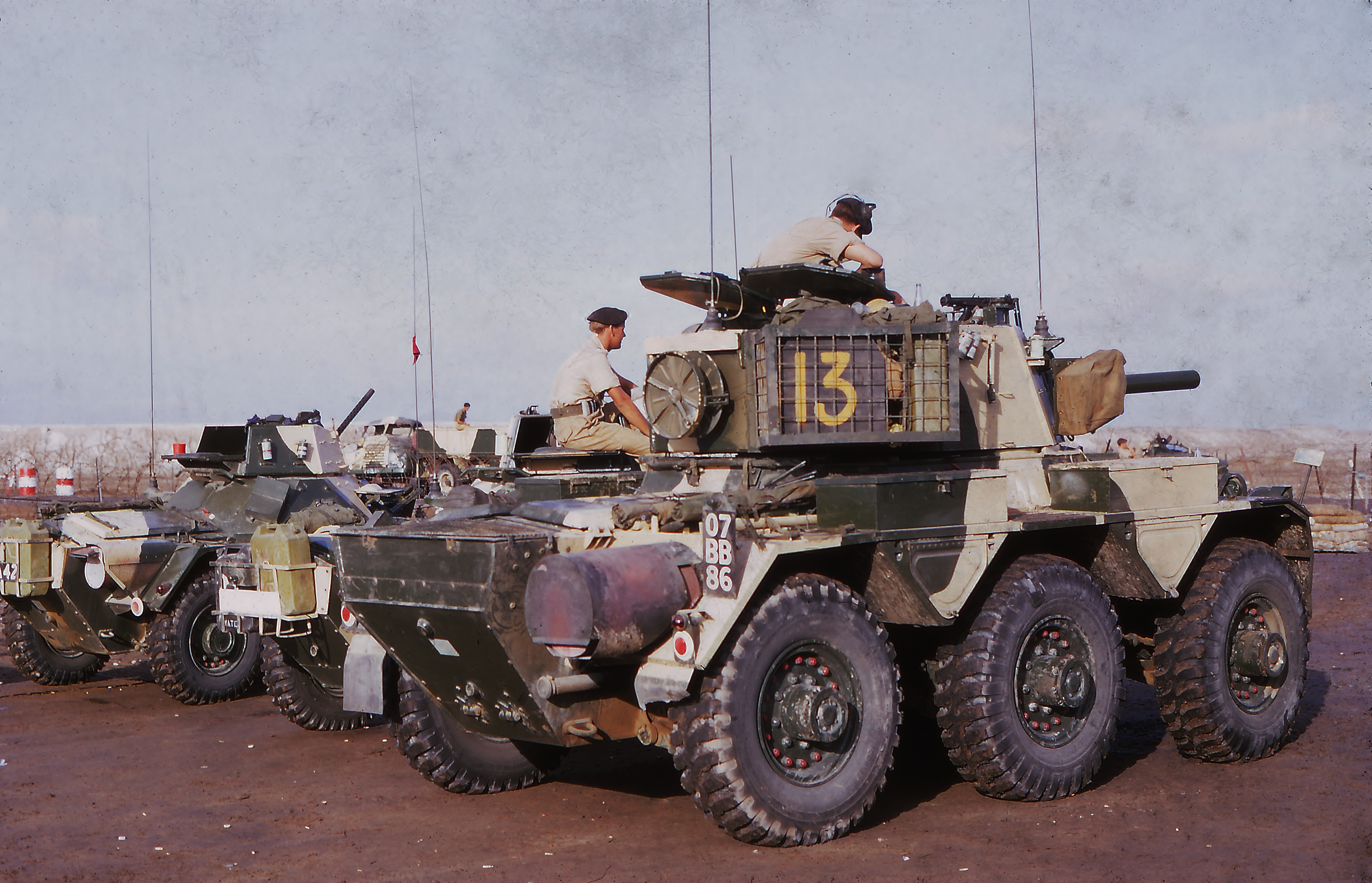
Gibbs served as chief of staff during the Aden Evacuation.

He was appointed Commander of British Land Forces in the Persian Gulf on 30 April 1969 in which role he re-organised the Trucial Oman Scouts and laid the foundations for what is now the Sultan of Oman's Land Forces. Appointed a Knight Commander of the Order of the Bath in the New Year Honours 1972, he became Commander of 1st (British) Corps with the rank of lieutenant general on 14 January 1972 and Commander-in-Chief, UK Land Forces with the rank of full general on 1 April 1974. Advanced to Knight Grand Cross of the Order of the Bath in the Queen's Birthday Honours 1976 and having become ADC General to the Queen on 25 June 1976, he became Chief of the General Staff on 15 July 1976. In this capacity he had to deal with the challenges of recruitment and retention in the army at a time of high inflation. He was promoted to field marshal on 13 July 1979 on his retirement from the British Army.

He was also colonel commandant of the 2nd Battalion the Royal Green Jackets from 1971 and colonel commandant of the Parachute Regiment from 1972.

Gibbs retired to a former rectory in Wiltshire, where his pastimes were shooting, hunting with the Beaufort, and painting. He was the Constable of the Tower of London from 1985 to 1990 and served as Lord Lieutenant of Wiltshire from 1989 to 1996.

His interests included shooting and hunting: he used to follow the Beaufort Hunt until a medical operation on his knee halted further participation. He was also a keen amateur artist. He died on 31 October 2004.

== Family ==
In 1955, Gibbs married Davina Merry, the artist; they had two sons, and a daughter.

== Bibliography ==
- Heathcote, Tony (1999). The British Field Marshals 1736–1997. Barnsley (UK): Pen & Sword. ISBN 0-85052-696-5.

Military offices
Preceded by Sir John Sharp	GOC 1st (British) Corps; 1972–1974	Succeeded by Sir Jack Harman
Preceded by Sir Basil Eugster	C-in-C, UK Land Forces; 1974–1976	Succeeded by Sir Edwin Bramall
Preceded by Sir Peter Hunt	Chief of the General Staff; 1976–1979	Succeeded by Sir Edwin Bramall
Honorary titles
Preceded by Sir Hugh Brassey	Lord Lieutenant of Wiltshire; 1989–1996	Succeeded by Sir Maurice Johnston
Preceded by Sir Peter Hunt	Constable of the Tower of London; 1985–1990	Succeeded by Sir John Stanier
