= Cecil Sugden =

General Sir Cecil Sugden GBE KCB
- Born: 4 December 1903; Rawalpindi, British India
- Died: 25 March 1963 (aged 59); Queen Alexandra Military Hospital, Millbank, London, England
- Military career
- Allegiance: United Kingdom
- Branch: British Army
- Service years: 1923–1961
- Rank: General
- Nickname: "Cuthbert Sugden"
- Service number: 27005
- Unit: Royal Engineers
- Commands: British Forces in Hong Kong; Allied Forces Northern Europe
- Conflicts: Second World War
- Awards: Knight Grand Cross of the Order of the British Empire; Knight Commander of the Order of the Bath

General Sir Cecil Stanway Sugden, GBE, KCB (4 December 1903 – 25 March 1963) was a senior British Army officer who served as Master-General of the Ordnance from 1962 to 1963.

== Military career ==
Educated at Brighton College, Sugden was commissioned as a second lieutenant into the Royal Engineers on 29 August 1923. He attended the Staff College, Quetta from 1932 to 1933.

Sugden served in the Second World War in North Africa and then was Director of Plans at the War Office from 1943. After the war he became Director of Military Operations at the War Office in 1945. He became a brigadier on the General Staff at Headquarters British Troops in Egypt in 1947, the same year he served as an instructor at the Imperial Defence College, and then chief of staff there in 1948.

Sugden returned to the War Office as Director of Personnel Administration in 1949 and then became chief of staff for British Army of the Rhine in 1951. He was appointed Commander of British Forces in Hong Kong in 1954 and Commander-in-Chief of Allied Forces Northern Europe in 1956. He served as Quartermaster-General to the Forces from 1958 to 1961, when he became Master-General of the Ordnance.

== Bibliography ==
- Smart, Nick (2005). Biographical Dictionary of British Generals of the Second World War. Barnesley: Pen & Sword. ISBN 1844150496.

Military offices
Preceded by Sir Terence Airey	Commander of British Forces in Hong Kong; 1954–1955	Succeeded by Sir William Stratton
Preceded by Sir Robert Mansergh	Commander-in-Chief of Allied Forces Northern Europe; 1956–1958	Succeeded by Sir Horatius Murray
Preceded by Sir Nevil Brownjohn	Quartermaster-General to the Forces; 1958–1961	Succeeded by Sir Gerald Lathbury
Preceded by Sir John Cowley	Master-General of the Ordnance; 1962–1963	Succeeded by Sir Charles Jones
