= Frank de Pass =

Recipient of the Victoria Cross

- Born: 26 April 1887; Kensington, Middlesex, England
- Died: 25 November 1914 (aged 27); Festubert, France
- Burial place: Bethune Town Cemetery
- Military career
- Allegiance: United Kingdom
- Branch: British Indian Army
- Service years: 1906–1914
- Rank: Lieutenant
- Units: Royal Horse Artillery; 34th Prince Albert Victor's Own Poona Horse
- Conflicts: First World War
- Awards: Victoria Cross; Mentioned in Despatches

Frank Alexander de Pass, VC (26 April 1887 – 25 November 1914) was an officer in the British Indian Army and a recipient of the Victoria Cross (VC), the highest award for gallantry in the face of the enemy that can be awarded to British and Commonwealth forces. He was the first Jew to receive the VC.

== Early life and family ==
Dress uniform of Lt Frank Alexander de Pass on display at the Jewish Military Museum in 2013

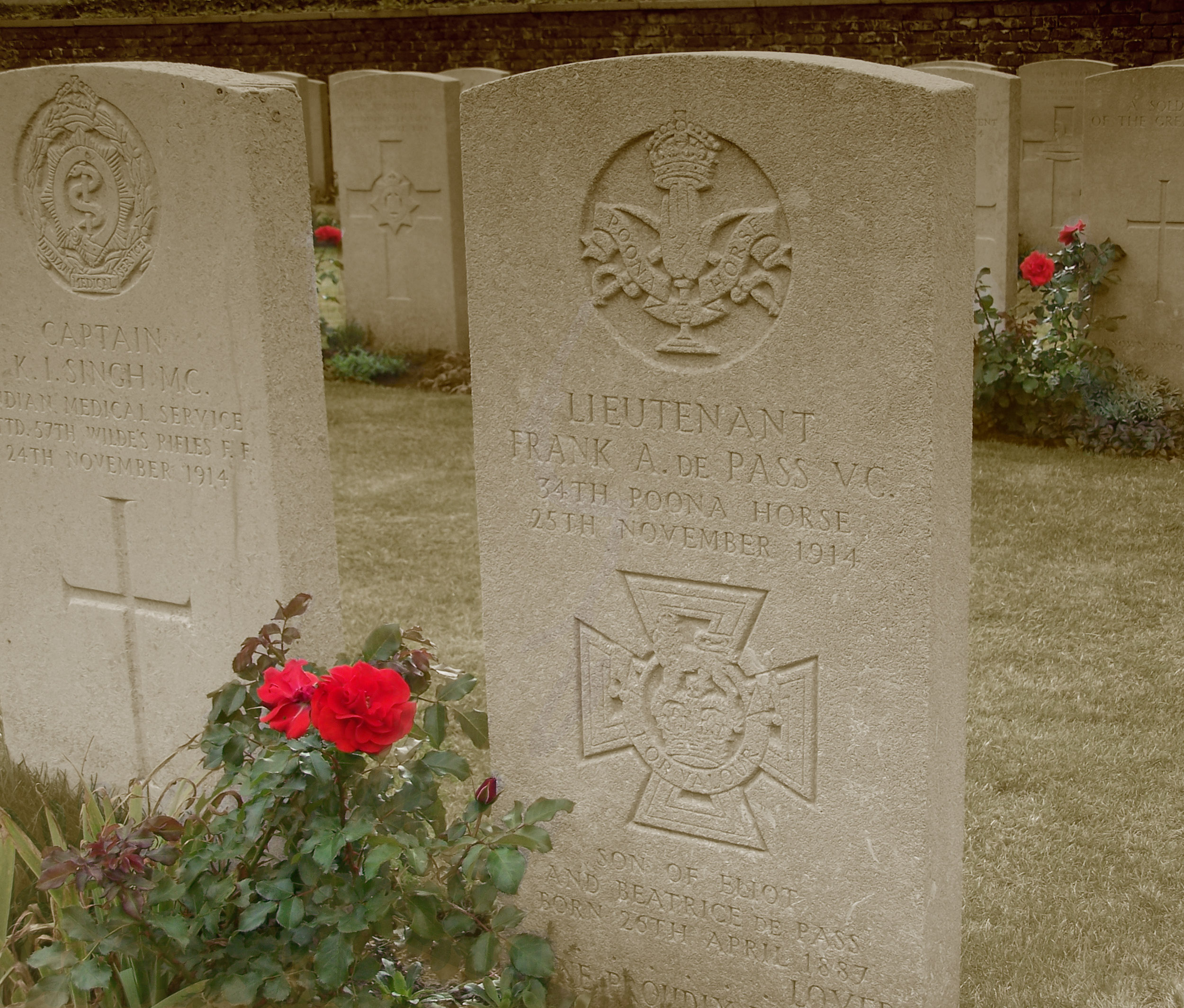
De Pass' grave marker at Bethune Commonwealth War Graves Cemetery in France

De Pass was born in Kensington to London merchant Sir Eliot de Pass and Beatrice de Mercado. The family's original surname, Shalom, was translated to the Spanish word for peace and became Paz before being anglicised to Pass when the family first settled in England in the 1660s. De Pass attended Rugby School.

His sister, Marjorie, married Sir Henry Kitson and had two sons, including Sir Frank Kitson.

== First World War ==
By the age of 27, De Pass had attained the rank of lieutenant in the 34th Prince Albert Victor's Own Poona Horse.

On 24 November 1914, de Pass entered a German sap near Festubert, France, and destroyed a traverse in the face of the enemy's bombs. He also rescued, under heavy fire, a wounded man who was lying exposed to enemy bullets in the open. The next day, de Pass was killed in a second attempt to capture the sap, which the enemy had re-occupied. He was posthumously awarded the Victoria Cross on 18 February 1915. His Victoria Cross is displayed at the National Army Museum in Chelsea, London.National Army Museum (2023). "Lieutenant Frank de Pass". National Army Museum. The full citation for the award reads as follows:

For conspicuous bravery near Festubert on the 24th November, in entering a German sap and destroying a traverse in the face of the enemy's bombs, and for subsequently rescuing, under heavy fire, a wounded man who was lying exposed in the open. Lieutenant de Pass lost his life on this day in a second attempt to capture the aforementioned sap, which had been re-occupied by the enemy.

In 2014, on the centennial of his death, de Pass was honoured with a memorial paving stone laid outside the Ministry of Defence in Whitehall, London. The ceremony was attended by his nephew, Colonel Jonny Kitson, his great nephew Thomas Kitson and Victoria Cross recipient Sergeant Johnson Beharry.

== See also ==
- Darwan Singh Negi

== Publications ==
- Gliddon, Gerald (2011) [1994]. 1914. VCs of the First World War. The History Press. ISBN 978-0752459080.
