= Eliot de Pass =

English merchant (1851–1937)

Sir Eliot de Pass
- Sir Eliot de Pass in 1933
- Born: Eliot Arthur de Pass; 16 March 1851; London, England
- Died: 11 July 1937 (aged 86); London, England
- Occupation: Merchant
- Spouse: Beatrice de Mercado (m. 1883)
- Relatives: Frank de Pass (son); Sir Henry Kitson (son-in-law); Sir Frank Kitson (grandson)

Sir Eliot Arthur de Pass KBE FRSA (16 March 1851 – 11 July 1937) was an English merchant in the West Indies. He was the founder of EA de Pass & Co., which specialised in trading sugar and coffee from Jamaica.

== Early life and family ==
De Pass was born in London into a Sephardic Jewish family, the son of Abraham Daniel de Pass, of Norfolk, and his wife, Judith Lazarus, of Kingston, Jamaica. The family's original surname, Shalom, was translated to the Spanish word for "peace" and became Paz. It was anglicised to Pass upon his ancestors' arrival in England in the 1660s. He was descended from Elias de Paz, who was among the original 12 Jewish brokers admitted to the privileges of the Royal Exchange, London in 1697.

== Education and career ==
He was educated privately in Brighton and in Germany before beginning his own career, first as special commissioner and attorney of the Windsor and Annapolis Railway in Nova Scotia, 1873–78. He then joined the family business of trade and became a merchant in the West Indies. He was an active member of the West India Committee and served as its chairman from 1925 to 1936, and then served as president until his death. He also served as governor of the Imperial College of Tropical Agriculture, and was vice-president of the British Empire Producers' Association.

He was knighted in 1930 and appointed a Knight Commander of the Order of the British Empire (KBE) in the 1937 New Year Honours. He was a Fellow of the Royal Society of Arts for more than three decades.

== Personal life ==
In 1883, de Pass married Beatrice de Mercado, the daughter of Isaac Henry de Mercado of Kingston, and had four sons, Harold, Frank, Eliot, and John, and one daughter, Marjorie.

His second son, Frank (1887–1914), was the first Jewish recipient of the Victoria Cross, which was awarded to him posthumously for conspicuous bravery. In 2014, on the centennial of Frank's death, he was honoured with a memorial paving stone laid outside the Ministry of Defence in Whitehall, London.

His daughter married Sir Henry Kitson and was the mother of Sir Frank Kitson.

== Death ==
He died at home in London, aged 86. After his death, Sir Edward Davson eulogised him in The Times:

With the death of Sir Eliot de Pass, the British Empire Producers' Organization has lost not only a vice-president and a friend but also one of its founders. Twenty-one years ago Sir Eliot was one of the small group of men who attended the first regular meeting of our council, and even in this year, at an age when few men are still in harness—he was an active journalist at the time of the Franco-Prussian war of 1870—he still actively assisted the organization as a member of council and of its sugar and coffee sections. All those who were privileged to know Sir Eliot will cherish the memory of a fine spirit. To great ability and mature wisdom were allied a kindliness and a charm which endeared him to all who met him.

— Sir Edward Davson, The Times, 16 July 1937
