= William Scotter =

British Army general (1922–1981)

General Sir William Scotter KCB OBE MC
- Born: 9 February 1922; Birkenhead, Cheshire, England
- Died: 5 February 1981 (aged 58); Chelsea, London, England
- Burial place: Aldershot Military Cemetery
- Military career
- Allegiance: United Kingdom
- Branch: British Indian Army; British Army
- Service years: 1941–1981
- Rank: General
- Nickname: Bill
- Service number: 325998
- Units: Scots Guards; 7th Gurkha Rifles
- Commands: British Army of the Rhine (1978–1980); 19th Infantry Brigade (1967–1969); 1st Battalion King's Own Royal Border Regiment (1965–1967)
- Conflicts: Second World War; Malayan Emergency
- Awards: Knight Commander of the Order of the Bath; Officer of the Order of the British Empire; Military Cross

General Sir William Norman Roy Scotter, KCB, OBE, MC (9 February 1922 – 5 February 1981) was a senior British Army officer who served as commander-in-chief, British Army of the Rhine from September 1978 until October 1980.

== Early life and education ==
William (Bill) Scotter was born in Birkenhead, Wirral on 9 February 1922, the son of Claude Norman Scotter (born Ulverston, Cumbria in 1889, died 1978 in Hampshire) and Hilda Marie Scotter (née Turner; 1892–1948). He had two brothers and one sister. Scotter was the grandson of Canon William Henry Scotter, one time vicar at Ulverston and his wife Emma Gordon Dill. He was also the great-nephew of Sir Charles Scotter, chairman and managing director of the London and South Western Railway. Scotter was educated at St. Bees School, Cumberland.

== Military career ==
=== Second World War ===
In June 1941 Scotter enlisted in the British Army and served in ranks of the Scots Guards. By 1942 he had attained the rank of lance corporal. After attending the Indian Military Academy, Dehra Dun, he was emergency commissioned into the 7th Gurkha Rifles, Indian Army on 26 November 1942. He served with the 7th Gurkha Rifles in India from 1943 until 1944, first as temporary captain, then as lieutenant. He later served in Burma from 1944 until 1945. It was for his actions in Burma on the night of 28 February 1945 at Meiktila as a company commander, where he was wounded, that he was awarded the Military Cross, serving as a temporary major with 1st battalion, 7th Gurkha Rifles.

=== Rise to senior command ===
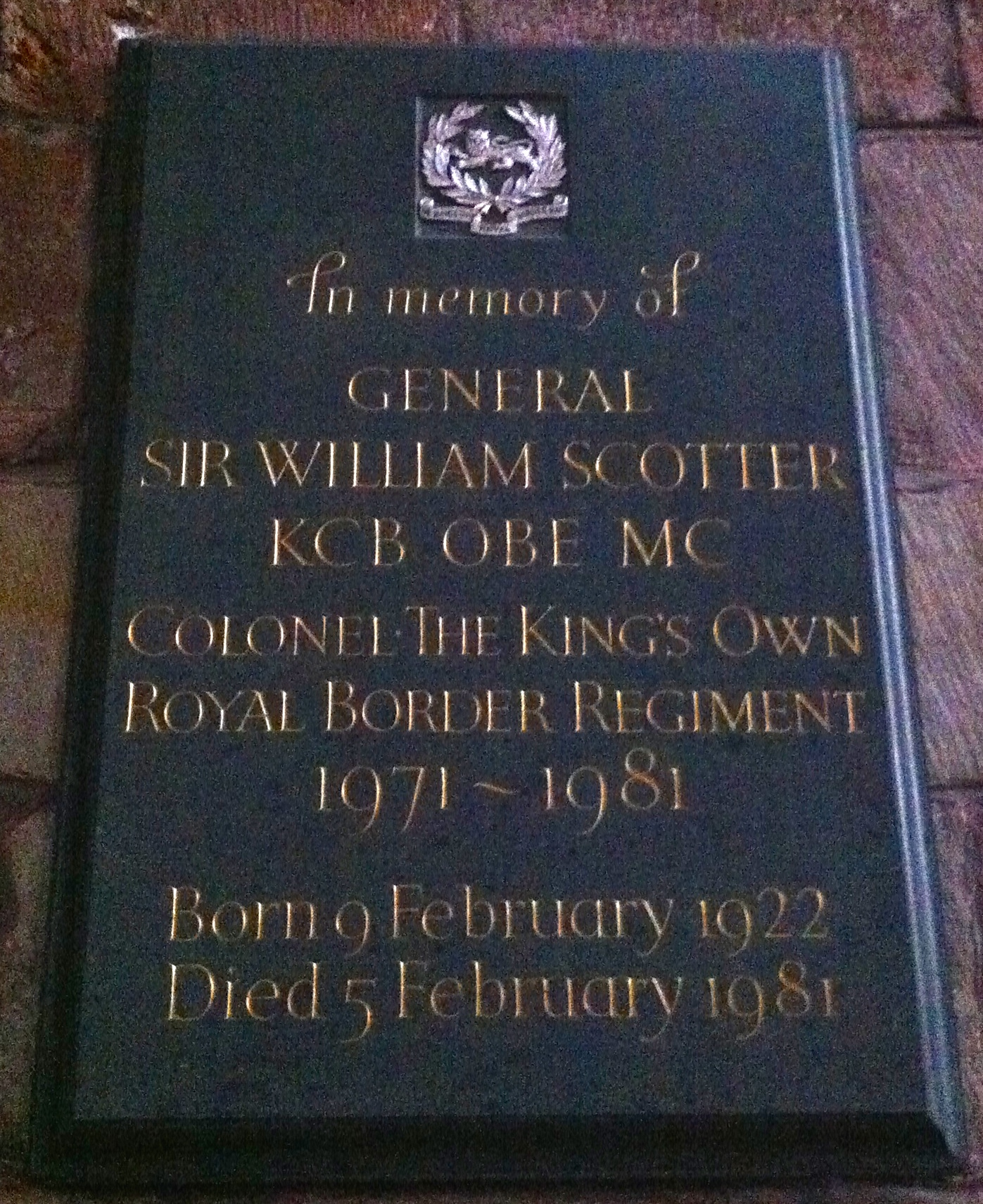
Memorial in Carlisle Cathedral

Having returned to England, Scotter was transferred from the Indian Army to the 2nd Battalion Border Regiment in 1945, as a Regular officer. After service in Malaya with the 1st Battalion, 2nd Gurkha Rifles from 1948 to 1951, and graduating from Staff College, Camberley, he was appointed commanding officer of the 1st Battalion King's Own Royal Border Regiment. By July 1967 he had been promoted to brigadier and been appointed commander of 19th Infantry Brigade. In 1965 was appointed an Officer of the Order of the British Empire, and in 1970 he was promoted to major general and appointed Chief of Staff Headquarters Southern Command. In 1972 he became Chief of Staff at Headquarters UK Land Forces. By this time he was also colonel of the King's Own Royal Border Regiment. Later in 1972 he became director of military operations at the Ministry of Defence.

Scotter was appointed a Knight Commander of the Order of the Bath in 1975, and promoted to Vice Chief of the General Staff at the Ministry of Defence in Whitehall in the rank of lieutenant general. In 1976 he became colonel commandant of the Army Physical Training Corps Aldershot. From September 1978 was promoted to general, as commander-in-chief, British Army of the Rhine, a role he held until October 1980, when he was replaced by General Sir Michael Gow.

== Death and memorials ==
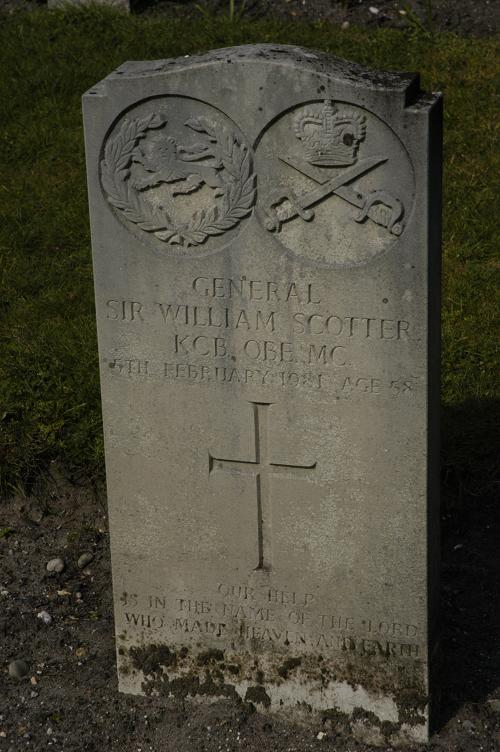
Headstone of Sir William Scotter in Aldershot Military Cemetery

Scotter was appointed to become Deputy Supreme Allied Commander Europe (DSACEUR) in April 1981. But he died on 5 February before he had the opportunity to take up this appointment. He was buried at Aldershot Military Cemetery with full military honours.

A plaque to Scotter's memory is displayed in the Kings Own Border Regiment Chapel in Carlisle Cathedral. His uniform and medals are displayed in Cumbria's Museum of Military Life in Carlisle Castle.

Military offices
Preceded by Sir David Fraser	Vice Chief of the General Staff; 1975–1978	Succeeded by Sir John Stanier
Preceded by Sir Frank King	Commander-in-Chief of the British Army of the Rhine; 1978–1980	Succeeded by Sir Michael Gow
