= John Stanier (British Army officer) =

British Army officer (1925–2007)

Field Marshal Sir John Stanier GCB MBE
- Field Marshal Sir John Stanier
- Born: 6 October 1925; Sawbridgeworth, Hertfordshire, England
- Died: 10 November 2007 (aged 82); Hartley Wintney, Hampshire, England
- Military career
- Allegiance: United Kingdom
- Branch: British Army
- Service years: 1943–1985
- Rank: Field Marshal
- Service number: 365443
- Commands: Chief of the General Staff; UK Land Forces; Staff College, Camberley; 1st Division; 20th Armoured Brigade; Royal Scots Greys
- Conflicts: Second World War
- Awards: Knight Grand Cross of the Order of the Bath; Member of the Order of the British Empire
- Other work: Constable of the Tower of London (1990–1996)

Field Marshal Sir John Wilfred Stanier, GCB, MBE (6 October 1925 – 10 November 2007) was a senior British Army officer who served as Chief of the General Staff from 1982 to 1985. He was the first person after the Second World War to become the professional head of the British Army without having seen active service in that war or any subsequent campaign.

== Early life and education ==
Stanier was born in Sawbridgeworth, Hertfordshire, the son of Harold Allan Stanier and Penelope Rose Stanier (née Price). His father was badly wounded in the First World War, but was employed by John Spedan Lewis to manage his farms. He was educated at Marlborough College and took a short wartime course at Merton College, Oxford.

== Military career ==
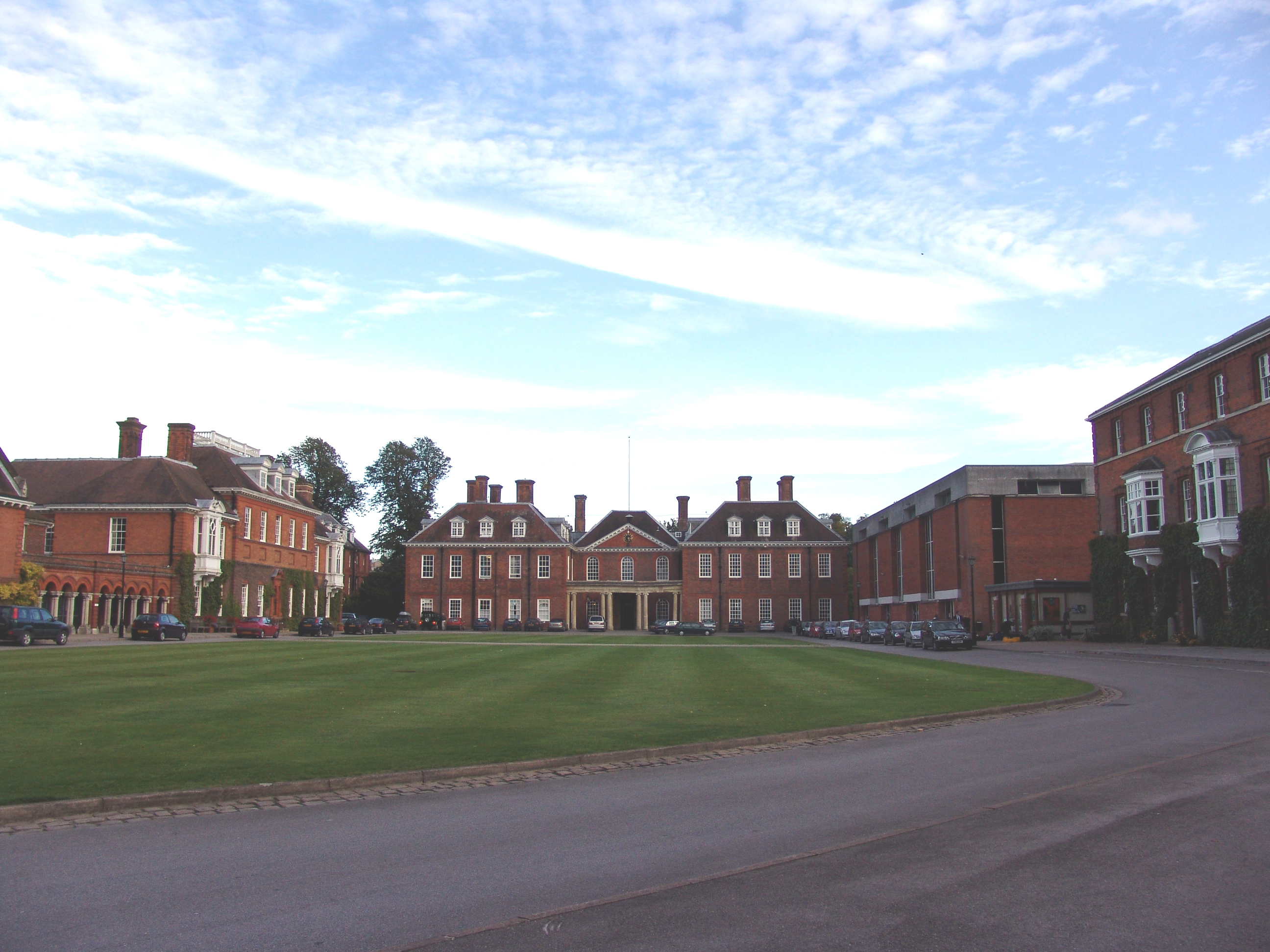
Marlborough College where Stanier was educated

Stanier volunteered for the Army in 1943, and having trained at Sandhurst and Bovington, was commissioned into the 7th Queen's Own Hussars on 19 April 1946. Promoted to lieutenant on 16 October 1948, he served with the intelligence branch in Italy in 1949 before being posted to the British Army of the Rhine in 1950. He was promoted to captain on 6 October 1952 and became an instructor at the Mons Officer Cadet School in Aldershot in April 1954, before attending the Staff College, Camberley in 1957. Following the merger of his regiment with the 3rd The King's Own Hussars, he became an officer in the Queen's Own Hussars in 1958 and was posted to the Directorate of Military Operations at the War Office, before being appointed military assistant to Sir William Stratton, Vice-Chief of the Imperial General Staff in July 1959. Promoted to major on 6 October 1959, he was appointed a Member of the Order of the British Empire in the New Year Honours 1961. He attended the Joint Services Staff College and, from 1962, commanded the tanks in "C" Squadron of his regiment in Germany, before returning to Camberley as Director of Studies in 1963.

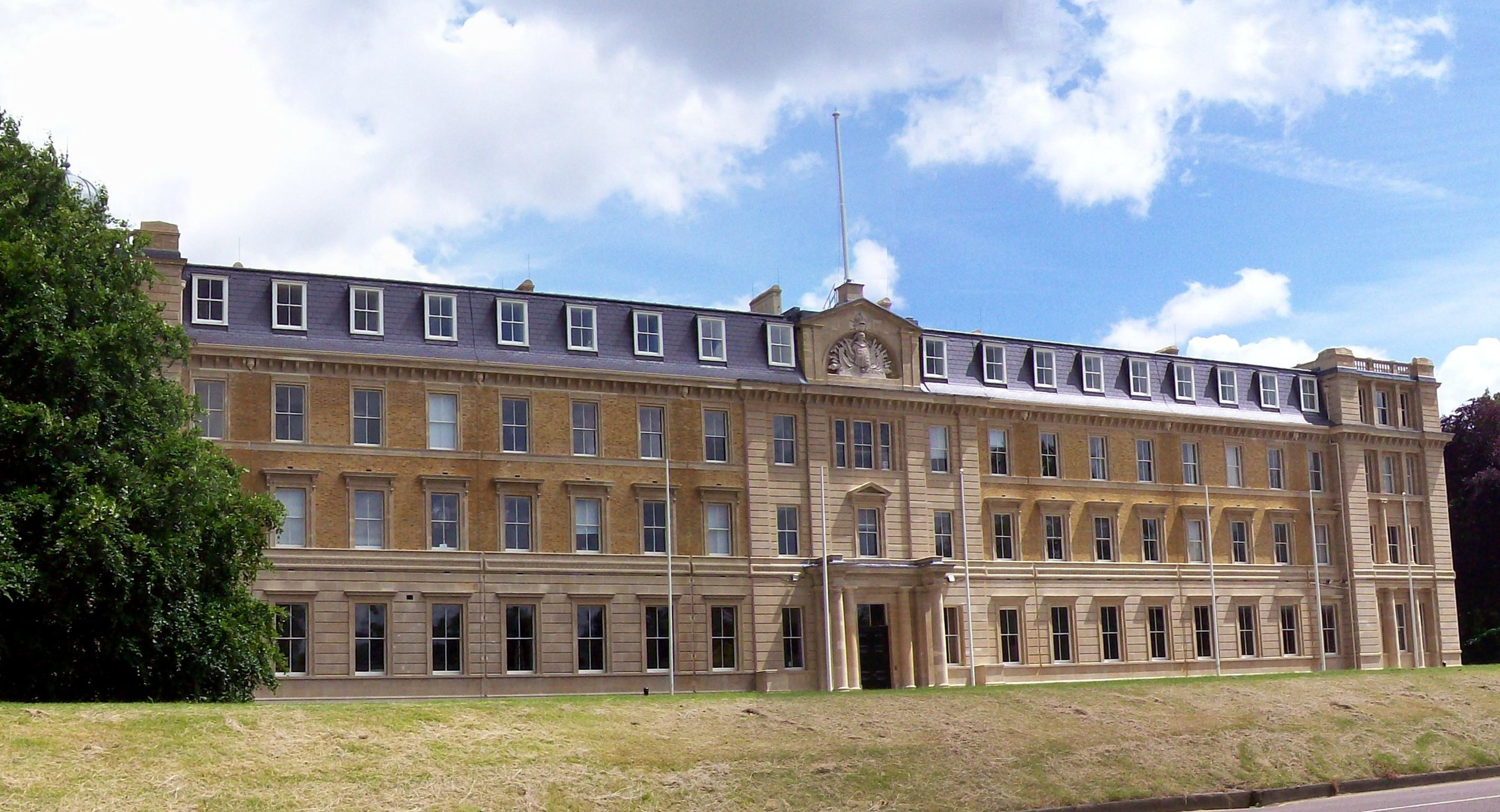
Stanier served as Commandant of the Staff College, Camberley

Stanier was not selected to command the Queen's Own Hussars. Disappointed, he considered leaving the Army, but was pleasantly surprised, having transferred to the Royal Scots Greys on 1 January 1966, to be promoted to lieutenant-colonel on 2 May 1966 and made commanding officer of the Royal Scots Greys. He joined the staff of the Imperial Defence College in December 1968, and was then promoted two ranks to brigadier on 31 December 1969 and took command of 20th Armoured Brigade in the British Army of the Rhine in January 1970. After serving as the Army's director of public relations in London from 1971, he was appointed General Officer Commanding 1st Division on 3 November 1973 with the substantive rank of major-general from 21 January 1974. He became Commandant at the Staff College, Camberley on 22 December 1975.

He was appointed a Knight Commander of the Order of the Bath in the Queen's Birthday Honours 1978, and became Vice Chief of the General Staff with the rank of lieutenant general on 1 June 1978. The Challenger tank was brought into service during his period in this post. Promoted to full general on 1 January 1981, he was made Commander-in-Chief, UK Land Forces in April 1981. He became ADC General to the Queen from 7 April 1981, was advanced to Knight Grand Cross of the Order of the Bath in the Queen's Birthday Honours 1982 and became Chief of the General Staff on 1 August 1982. He was the first person after the Second World War to become the professional head of the British Army without having seen active service in that war or any subsequent campaign. He was promoted to field marshal on 10 July 1985 on retirement from the British Army.

He was also Colonel of the Royal Scots Dragoon Guards from 18 January 1979 to 6 May 1984, and Colonel Commandant of the Royal Armoured Corps from 1 April 1982 to 1 August 1985.

In retirement he served as chairman of the Royal United Service Institution from 1986 to 1989. He was Constable of the Tower of London from 1990 to 1996. His book War and the Media, co-authored with Miles Hudson, was published in 1997. He was a Deputy Lieutenant of Hampshire from 1987, and lived near Hartley Wintney.

His interests included fly fishing, sailing and horse riding and he was also President of the Hampshire branch of the British Red Cross Society from 1986 to 1994. He was also a Member of the Council of Marlborough College. He died on 10 November 2007.

== Family ==
In 1955 he married Cicely Constance Lambert; they had four daughters.

Military offices
Preceded by Edwin Bramall	General Officer Commanding 1st Division; 1973–1975	Succeeded by David Alexander-Sinclair
Preceded by Hugh Beach	Commandant of the Staff College, Camberley; 1975–1978	Succeeded by Frank Kitson
Preceded by Sir William Scotter	Vice Chief of the General Staff; 1978–1980	Succeeded by Sir Thomas Morony
Preceded by Sir Timothy Creasey	C-in-C, UK Land Forces; 1981–1982	Succeeded by Sir Frank Kitson
Preceded by Sir Edwin Bramall	Chief of the General Staff; 1982–1985	Succeeded by Sir Nigel Bagnall
Honorary titles
Preceded by Sir Roland Gibbs	Constable of the Tower of London; 1990–1996	Succeeded by Sir Peter Inge
