= William Stratton (British Army officer) =

British General (1903–1989)

Lieutenant-General Sir William Stratton KCB CVO CBE DSO
- Born: 15 October 1903; Madras, British India
- Died: 25 November 1989 (aged 86)
- Military career
- Allegiance: United Kingdom
- Branch: British Army
- Service years: 1924−1960
- Rank: Lieutenant-General
- Service number: 27948
- Unit: Royal Engineers
- Commands: Commander British Forces in Hong Kong; 42nd (East Lancashire) Infantry Division; 169th Infantry Brigade
- Conflicts: Second World War
- Awards: Knight Commander of the Order of the Bath; Commander of the Royal Victorian Order; Commander of the Order of the British Empire; Distinguished Service Order

Lieutenant-General Sir William Henry Stratton, KCB, CVO, CBE, DSO (15 October 1903 – 25 November 1989) was a senior British Army officer who was Commander of British Forces in Hong Kong from 1955 to 1957.

== Military career ==
Stratton was born on 15 October 1903 in British India but later went to England and, after graduating from the Royal Military Academy, Woolwich, was commissioned as a second lieutenant in the Royal Engineers on 30 January 1924. He was deployed to the Gold Coast before becoming Assistant Instructor at the Royal School of Military Engineering in 1933.

He served in the Second World War as a brigadier on the General Staff of General Headquarters Home Forces and then of the General Staff of the 8th Army in Italy. In 1944 he was appointed Commander of 169th Infantry Brigade.

After the war he was appointed Chief of Staff at British Army of the Rhine, a post he held until 1949 when he became Commandant of the Joint Services Staff College. In 1952 he became Head of the British Army Staff in Washington, D.C. He went on to be General Officer Commanding 42nd (Lancashire) Division in 1953 and Commander of British Forces in Hong Kong in 1955. He was appointed a Knight Commander of the Order of the Bath in the 1957 New Year Honours. His last post was Vice Chief of the Imperial General Staff in 1957; he retired in 1960.

He was also Colonel Commandant of the Royal Engineers from 1960 to 1968.

Military offices
Preceded by Cyril Douglas-Pennant	Commandant of the Joint Services Staff College; 1949–1952	Succeeded by ??
Preceded by Valentine Blomfield	GOC 42nd (Lancashire) Division; 1953−1955	Succeeded by Thomas Scott
Preceded by Sir Cecil Sugden	Commander of British Forces in Hong Kong; 1955–1957	Succeeded by Sir Edric Bastyan
Preceded by Sir William Oliver	Vice Chief of the Imperial General Staff; 1957–1960	Succeeded by Sir William Pike
