= Nevil Brownjohn =

British Army general

General Sir Nevil Brownjohn GBE KCB CMG MC
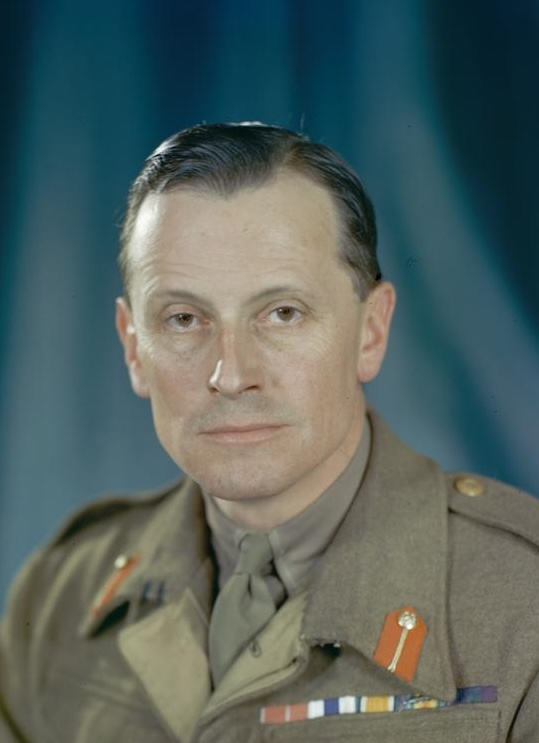
- Nevil Brownjohn, c. 1942
- Born: 25 July 1897; Richmond, Surrey, England
- Died: 21 April 1973 (aged 75)
- Military career
- Allegiance: United Kingdom
- Branch: British Army
- Service years: 1915–1958
- Rank: General
- Nickname: BJ
- Service number: 11450
- Unit: Royal Engineers
- Conflicts: First World War; Second World War
- Awards: Knight Grand Cross of the Order of the British Empire; Knight Commander of the Order of the Bath; Companion of the Order of St Michael and St George; Military Cross; Legion of Merit (US); Presidential Medal of Freedom (US)

General Sir Nevil Charles Dowell Brownjohn, GBE, KCB, CMG, MC (25 July 1897 – 21 April 1973) was a senior British Army officer who served as Quartermaster-General to the Forces from 1956 until his retirement in 1958.

A graduate of Malvern College and Royal Military Academy, Woolwich, Brownjohn was commissioned into the Royal Engineers in April 1915 and served in France and Palestine in the First World War, and was awarded the Military Cross in 1917. He attended the Staff College, Camberley from 1931 to 1932. During the Second World War he rose to the rank of major general, and was the Deputy Chief of Staff (G-4) in charge of logistics at General Dwight D. Eisenhower's SHAEF, and was Deputy Quartermaster-General in the Middle East.

After the war he took charge of Administration for the British Army of the Rhine and then joined the Control Commission (British Sector) for Germany in 1947. He became Vice Quartermaster General at the War Office in 1949 and Vice Chief of Imperial General Staff in 1950. He was Chief Staff Officer at the Ministry of Defence from 1952 to 1955 when he became Quartermaster-General to the Forces.

== Military career ==
Nevil Charles Dowell Brownjohn was born in Richmond, Surrey, England, on 25 July 1897, the son of Arthur Dowell Brownjohn. He was educated at Malvern College and the Royal Military Academy, Woolwich. He was nicknamed "BJ".

Brownjohn was commissioned into the Royal Engineers in April 1915, and served with its Signals branch in the First World War in France and Palestine, where he was awarded the Military Cross in 1917. When the Royal Corps of Signals was separated from the Royal Engineers in 1920, Brownjohn remained with the Royal Engineers. He was promoted to captain on 29 November 1922.

Already fluent in French, Brownjohn became an interpreter in Russian. In 1927 he was sent to China to protect the international settlement in Shanghai; he used his skills as a Russian speaker to raise a works company of White Russians headed by a former Tsarist engineer officer. He married Isabelle White in 1929; they had one son.

After attending the Staff College, Camberley from 1931 to 1932, where he graduated with an "A" grading, Brownjohn was posted to the War Office as a GSO3 on 1 April 1934. He then and became brigade major at the School of Military Engineering on 1 March 1936. He was breveted as a lieutenant colonel on 1 January 1938, and returned to the War Office as a GSO2 on 1 September 1938. He was promoted to the substantive rank of lieutenant colonel on 26 May 1939.

Brownjohn served in the Second World War, initially in the War Office. He became an Officer of the Order of the British Empire on 1 July 1941 in the 1941 Birthday Honours, and was promoted to the substantive rank of colonel 18 September 1941, with seniority backdated to 1 January 1941. He was brigadier, general staff, Home Forces, from 1941 to 1942. He was granted the acting rank of major general non 27 July 1942, and the temporary rank on 27 July 1943. He was deputy Major General, Administration at Home Forces from 1942 to 1943.

In 1943 he joined the staff of the chief of staff to the Supreme Allied Commander (Designate) (COSSAC) as the Principal Administrative Officer (PAO), and in this role was involved in developing the supply and administrative arrangements for Operation Overlord. When COSSAC was absorbed into General Dwight D. Eisenhower's SHAEF in February 1944, Brownjohn became the Deputy Chief of Staff (G-4), the staff officer responsible for logistics under the American staff system. He remained in the role in charge until he was appointed Deputy Quartermaster-General in the Middle East in August 1944. He was made a Companion of the Order of the Bath in the 1944 Birthday Honours on 8 June 1944. He was promoted to the substantive rank of major general on 10 December 1945, with seniority backdated to 17 April 1944. He was awarded the American Legion of Merit on 17 October 1946 and the American Presidential Medal of Freedom with Silver Palm on 14 May 1948

After the war Brownjohn took charge of Administration for the British Army of the Rhine, and then in 1947 he joined the Allied Control Commission (British Sector) for Germany, where his fluency in French and Russian was put to use. For this service, he was made a Companion of the Order of St Michael and St George on 9 June 1950 in the 1950 Birthday Honours. He became Vice Quartermaster-General to the Forces at the War Office in 1949. He was promoted to lieutenant general on 18 February 1950, when he became Vice Chief of Imperial General Staff, a position he held until 22 October 1952. He became a Knight Grand Cross of the Order of the Bath on 1 January 1951. Brownjohn was Chief Staff Officer at the Ministry of Defence from 1 December 1952 to 1 December 1956, when he became Quartermaster-General to the Forces. He was promoted to general on 10 November 1953. He became colonel commandant of the Royal Engineers on 31 January 1955, a position he held until he retired from the Army on 29 November 1958. He was created a Knight Grand Cross of the Order of the British Empire in the 1957 Birthday Honours on 13 June 1957. He retired in 1958.

== Later life ==
After retiring from the Army, he became the Chairman of the Crawley Development Corporation and a Member of the Commission for the New Towns, posts he held until he was 69. He also served with charitable organisations and was on the Trustee Council of the Douglas Haig Memorial Homes. He died on 21 April 1973.

== Bibliography ==
- Mead, Richard (2007). Churchill's Lions: A Biographical Guide to the Key British Generals of World War II. Stroud: Spellmount. ISBN 978-1-86227-431-0. OCLC 171539131.
- Morgan, Frederick (1962). Overture to Overlord. London: Mayflower. OCLC 30213543.
- Pogue, Forrest C. (1954). The Supreme Command (PDF). Washington, DC: Office of the Chief of Military History, Department of the Army. OCLC 858561367. Archived from the original (PDF) on 27 September 2012.
- Smart, Nick (2005). Biographical Dictionary of British Generals of the Second World War. Barnesley: Pen & Sword. ISBN 1844150496. OCLC 58555546.

Military offices
Preceded by Sir Gerald Templer	Vice Chief of the Imperial General Staff; 1950–1952	Succeeded by Sir Harold Redman
Preceded by Sir Maurice Chilton	Quartermaster-General to the Forces; 1956–1958	Succeeded by Sir Cecil Sugden
