= Peter Inge, Baron Inge =

British Army officer (1935–2022)

Field Marshal The Right Honourable The Lord Inge KG GCB PC DL
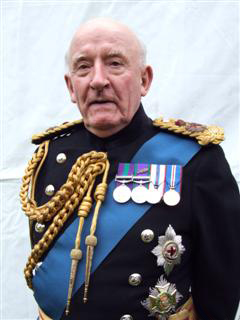
- Inge in 2007
- Born: 5 August 1935; Croydon, Surrey, England
- Died: 20 July 2022 (aged 86); Swinithwaite, North Yorkshire, England
- Military career
- Allegiance: United Kingdom
- Branch: British Army
- Service years: 1956–1997
- Rank: Field Marshal
- Service number: 448984
- Commands: Chief of the Defence Staff; Chief of the General Staff; British Army of the Rhine; Northern Army Group; I (BR) Corps; 2nd Infantry Division; 4th Armoured Brigade; 1st Battalion Green Howards
- Conflicts: Malayan Emergency; Operation Banner; Bosnian War
- Awards: Knight Companion of the Order of the Garter; Knight Grand Cross of the Order of the Bath; Mentioned in Despatches
- Other work: Deputy Lieutenant of North Yorkshire (1994–2022)

Member of the House of Lords
- Lord Temporal
- Life peerage 21 July 1997 – 25 April 2016

Personal details
- Party: Crossbencher

Field Marshal Peter Anthony Inge, Baron Inge (5 August 1935 – 20 July 2022) was a senior British Army officer. He was the Chief of the General Staff, the professional head of the British Army, from 1992 to 1994 and then served as Chief of the Defence Staff before retiring in 1997. Early in his military career he saw action during the Malayan Emergency and Operation Banner in Northern Ireland, and later in his career he provided advice to the British Government during the Bosnian War.

== Early life and education ==
The son of Raymond Albert Inge and Grace Maud Caroline Inge (née Du Rose), Inge was born in Croydon on 5 August 1935. He was educated first at Summer Fields School, Oxford and then at Wrekin College, Shropshire. He was conscripted into the army for National Service in September 1953 and was sent for officer cadet training at Eaton Hall, Cheshire before attending the Royal Military Academy Sandhurst.

== Military career ==
Inge was commissioned into the Green Howards from Sandhurst on 27 July 1956. He was promoted to lieutenant on 27 July 1958, served with the 1st Battalion the Green Howards in Hong Kong and Germany, and was deployed on operational service to Malaya during the Malayan Emergency. Appointed aide-de-camp to the general officer commanding 4th Division in 1960, he was promoted to captain on 27 July 1962, and made adjutant of the 1st Battalion the Green Howards in 1963.

After working in the Ministry of Defence, and being promoted to major on 31 December 1967, Inge returned to the 1st Battalion as a company commander in 1969 and was deployed to Northern Ireland. He served as brigade major with the 11th Armoured Brigade from August 1971, before being promoted to lieutenant colonel on 31 December 1972, and becoming an instructor at the Staff College, Camberley in 1973. He was appointed commanding officer of the 1st Battalion the Green Howards in 1974. Promoted to colonel on 31 December 1976, he commanded the Staff College's Junior Division from 1977 and, following his promotion to brigadier on 31 December 1979, he commanded Task Force C of the British Army of the Rhine from 1980. From 1982 he was chief of staff of I (British) Corps. He returned to Britain as General Officer Commanding North East District and Commander 2nd Infantry Division, based in York, from 12 January 1984 with the substantive rank of major general from 16 April. In 1986, he was appointed director general, logistics policy (army) at the Ministry of Defence.

Inge was promoted to lieutenant general and became general officer commanding I (British) Corps on 8 August 1987. He was appointed a Knight Commander of the Order of the Bath in the 1988 New Year Honours. He relinquished the corps command on 2 October 1989 and, on 27 November, he became the commander of NATO's Northern Army Group and commander-in-chief of British Army of the Rhine in Germany with the local rank of general; his rank was made substantive on 3 January 1990.

Having become aide-de-camp general to the Queen on 21 February 1991 and promoted to Knight Grand Cross of the Order of the Bath in the 1992 New Year Honours, Inge was appointed Chief of the General Staff in February 1992 and Chief of the Defence Staff with the rank of field marshal on 15 March 1994. Inge was the last active officer to be promoted to the rank. He served in this post, in which he provided military advice to the British government on the conduct of the Bosnian War, until he retired in 1997. He was appointed colonel of the Green Howards in 1982, Colonel Commandant of the Royal Military Police in 1987, and colonel commandant of the Army Physical Training Corps in 1988.

== Later career ==
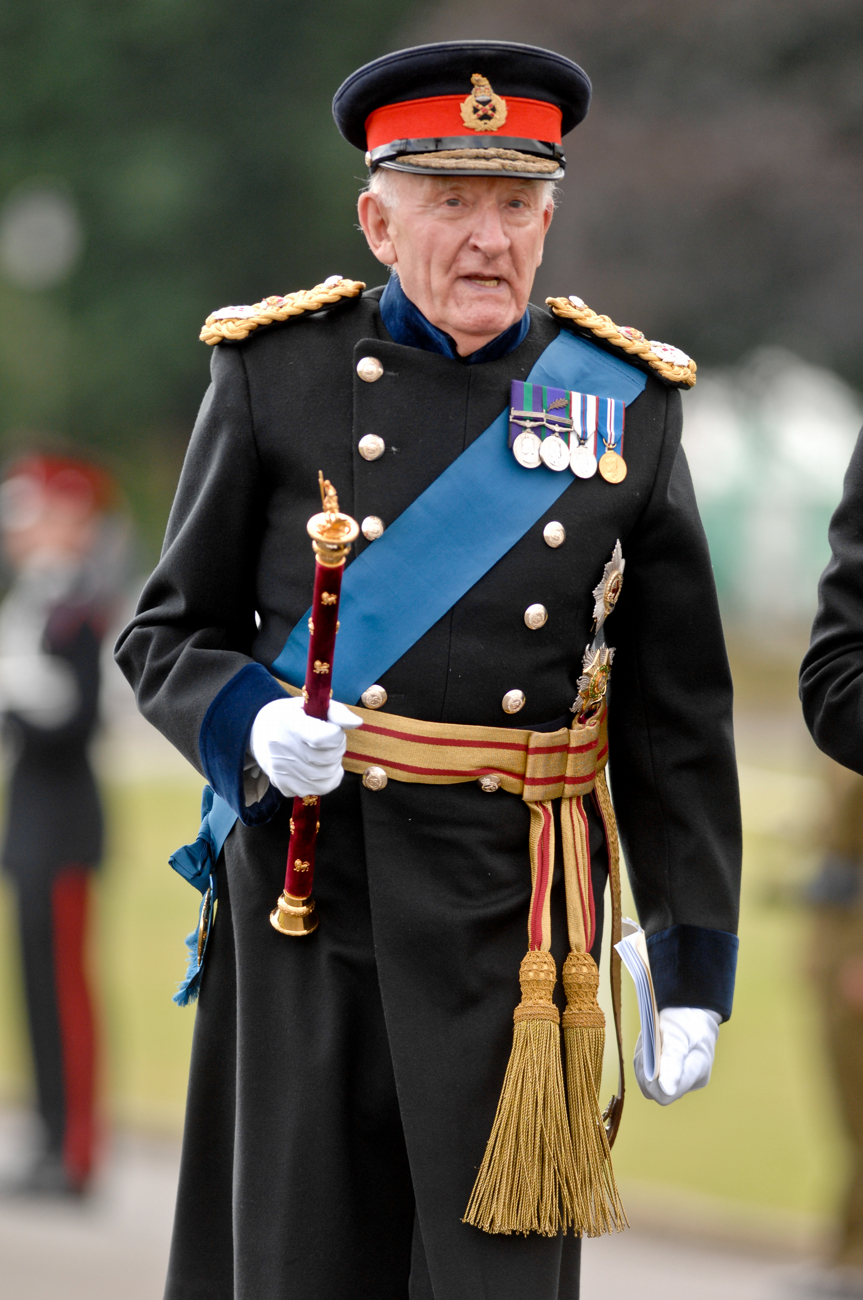
Field Marshal The Lord Inge in 2008

Inge was appointed Deputy Lieutenant of North Yorkshire (DL) in 1994.

After stepping down as Chief of the Defence Staff, he was created a life peer as Baron Inge, of Richmond in the County of North Yorkshire, in 1997. Inge was appointed a Knight Companion of the Order of the Garter on 23 April 2001, and retired from the Lords on 25 April 2016, where he had been an opponent of further EU integration.

In 2004 Inge was made a Privy Counsellor and appointed to serve as a member of the Butler Inquiry team, which examined the use of intelligence during the Iraq War. Chaired by Robin Butler, Baron Butler of Brockwell, the inquiry determined that the intelligence used to declare Iraq's possession of "Weapons of Mass Destruction" was flawed. He was critical of the British handling of conflicts in Iraq and Afghanistan, reportedly saying in 2006 that he "feared we had lost the ability to think strategically".

In retirement Inge became a non-executive director of Racal Electronics plc, commissioner of the Royal Hospital Chelsea, trustee of the Historic Royal Palaces, and president of the Army Benevolent Fund. He was a member of the advisory board of Aegis Defence Services, a private military company based in London having previously, until February 2010, been the chairman of the board of directors.

== Personal life and death ==
Inge enjoyed watching cricket, walking, reading and music. He was a member of the Marylebone Cricket Club, Boodle's and several other gentlemen's clubs.

In 1960 Inge married Letitia Thornton-Berry; they had two daughters, Antonia and Verity. Lady Inge died in 2020.

Inge later suffered from Alzheimer's disease. He died at home in Swinithwaite, North Yorkshire, on 20 July 2022, at the age of 86.

== Arms ==
Coat of arms of Field Marshal Peter Anthony Inge, Baron Inge, KG, GCB, PC, DL
Notes Knight since 1988 Coronet Coronet of a Baron Crest Issuing from a representation of the White Tower of London Argent, a Phoenix Or, inflamed Gules. Torse Mantling Argent and Gules. Escutcheon Argent, on a Cross nowy formy throughout Gules, the limbs voided Vert, a Rose Argent, barbed and seeded Or. Supporters Dexter: a Ram Or, armed, unguled and gorged with Lozenges conjoined Gules, supporting a UK Field Marshal’s Baton erect proper. Sinister: a Lion Or, gorged with Lozenges conjoined Gules, supporting a UK Field Marshal’s Baton erect proper. Compartment A Limestone Rock proper. Motto SEMPER FIDES; Latin: Always faithful Orders The Order of the Garter circlet (Appointed 2001). The collar as Knight Grand Cross of the Order of the Bath (Appointed KCB 1988 & GCB 1992) Banner The banner of the Baron Inge's arms used as Knight Companion of the Garter depicted at St George's Chapel.

Military offices
Preceded by Sir Patrick Palmer	General Officer Commanding North East District and Commander 2nd Infantry Division; 1984–1985	Succeeded by Sir Charles Guthrie
Preceded by Sir Brian Kenny	General Officer Commanding 1st (British) Corps; 1987–1989	Succeeded by Sir Charles Guthrie
Preceded by Sir Brian Kenny	Commander-in-Chief British Army of the Rhine; 1989–1992	Succeeded by Sir Charles Guthrie
Preceded by Sir John Chapple	Chief of the General Staff; 1992–1994	Succeeded by Sir Charles Guthrie
Preceded by Sir Peter Harding	Chief of the Defence Staff; 1994–1997	Succeeded by Sir Charles Guthrie
Honorary titles
Preceded by Sir John Stanier	Constable of the Tower of London; 1996–2001	Succeeded by Sir Roger Wheeler
