= John Reith =

John Reith may refer to:

- John Reith, 1st Baron Reith (1889–1971), Scottish broadcasting executive
- John Reith (British Army officer) (born 1948)
