= General Hobbs =

General Hobbs may refer to:

- Leland Hobbs (1892–1966), U.S. Army major general
- Michael Hobbs (British Army officer) (born 1937), British Army major general
- Reginald Hobbs (1908–1977), British Army major general
- Talbot Hobbs (1864–1938), Australian Army lieutenant general
