= John Ward-Harrison =

British Army general

Major-General John Ward-Harrison OBE MC DL
- Born: 1918
- Died: 26 March 1985 (aged 66–67)
- Military career
- Allegiance: United Kingdom
- Branch: British Army
- Rank: Major-General
- Service number: 67390
- Commands: Staff College, Camberley; North East District
- Conflicts: Second World War
- Awards: Officer of the Order of the British Empire; Military Cross

Major-General John Martin Donald Ward-Harrison OBE MC DL (1918 – 26 March 1985) was a British Army officer.

== Military career ==
Ward-Harrison was commissioned into the 5th Royal Inniskilling Dragoon Guards and saw action in North-West Europe during the Second World War. He became Deputy Commandant, Staff College, Camberley in 1966, General Officer Commanding, North East District in 1968 and Chief of Staff at Northern Command in 1970. He briefly returned to the command of North East District in January 1973 before retiring in July 1973.

He was appointed an Officer of the Order of the British Empire in the 1962 New Year Honours.

He married June Amoret Fleury Teulon.

Military offices
Preceded by Rex Whitworth	General Officer Commanding North East District; 1968–1970	Succeeded by Geoffrey Armitage
Preceded by Geoffrey Armitage	General Officer Commanding North East District; January 1973 – July 1973	Succeeded by Geoffrey Collin
