= Thomas Lacy =

Thomas Lacy may refer to:

- Thomas Edgar Lacy (1804–1880), British Army officer
- Thomas Hailes Lacy (1809–1873), British actor, playwright and theatrical manager
- Thomas J. Lacy (c. 1806–1849), American judge in Arkansas

== See also ==
- Thomas de Lacy (1773–1844), Anglican priest in Ireland
