= Michael Wilkes =

British Army general

General Sir Michael Wilkes KCB CBE
- Born: 11 June 1940
- Died: 27 October 2013 (aged 73)
- Military career
- Allegiance: United Kingdom
- Branch: British Army
- Service years: 1961–1995
- Rank: General
- Commands: UK Field Army; 3rd Armoured Division; 22 Armoured Brigade; 22 SAS Regiment
- Conflicts: Gulf War
- Awards: Knight Commander of the Order of the Bath; Commander of the Order of the British Empire

General Sir Michael John Wilkes, KCB, CBE (11 June 1940 – 27 October 2013) was a British Army officer who served as Adjutant-General to the Forces from 1993 to 1995.

== Early life ==
The son of an Artillery officer, Michael John Wilkes was born in Steep, Hampshire, on 11 June 1940 and educated at King's School, Rochester, where he played rugby for the 1st XV.

== Military career ==
Wilkes was commissioned into the Royal Artillery in 1961. In 1977, he took command of 22 SAS Regiment at the age of 36. The regiment had been given a new role in counter-terrorism. The training instituted involved hostage situations, negotiations with those making demands, and assaults when it was judged that talks had broken down. Under Wilkes's leadership, the regiment became adept at responding rapidly to the different tactics employed by terrorists. He also set up a robust liaison system linking the SAS commander to the police, the security services and the Cabinet Office Briefing Rooms (Cobra). In an increasingly turbulent world, other countries began to request help from Britain in developing their own specialised units to counter terrorism and to provide VIP protection. Then, in October 1977, a Lufthansa Boeing 737 on its way from Mallorca to Frankfurt with some 90 passengers and crew was hijacked by terrorists armed with guns and explosives. The Germans asked the SAS for help and Wilkes dispatched a small team to offer advice to GSG 9, Germany's anti-terrorist squad. The aircraft was stormed successfully at Mogadishu, Somalia, and the hostages freed. The operation gave added impetus to the expansion of training and organisation for anti-terrorist tasks by the regiment. Wilkes moved on in 1979, but the decisive intervention by the SAS in the Iranian Embassy siege in May the following year under Michael Rose was evidence of the value of his legacy.

Wilkes was appointed an Officer of the Order of the British Empire in the 1980 New Year Honours, was made commander of 22 Armoured Brigade in 1984 and became Director SAS in 1986. Advanced to Commander of the Order of the British Empire in the 1988 Birthday Honours, he was appointed General Officer Commanding 3rd Armoured Division in 1988, and Commander UK Field Army and Inspector General of the Territorial Army in 1990, remaining in that post until 1993. During Operation Granby, he was the Land Deputy to the Joint Commander Gulf Forces, who was based at HQ Strike Command. He was knighted as a Knight Commander of the Order of the Bath in the 1991 New Year Honours and, in 1993, he became Adjutant General. He retired from the British Army in 1995.

== Later life ==
In 1995, Wilkes was named a Knight of the Venerable Order of Saint John and became Lieutenant Governor of Jersey, a post he held until 2001. In 2008, he became a Director of Heritage Oil and of Stanley Gibbons. He died on 27 October 2013, leaving a wife, Anne, and two sons.

Military offices
| Preceded by John Foley | Director SAS; 1986–1988 | Succeeded by Michael Rose |
| Preceded by Edward Jones | General Officer Commanding 3rd Armoured Division; 1988–1990 | Succeeded by Christopher Wallace |
| Preceded by Sir David Ramsbotham | Commander UK Field Army; 1990–1993 | Succeeded by Sir Michael Rose |
| Preceded by Sir David Ramsbotham | Adjutant General; 1993–1995 | Succeeded by Sir Michael Rose |
| Preceded by Sir Richard Trant | Colonel Commandant and President, Honourable Artillery Company; 1992–1998 | Succeeded by Sir Alexander Harley |
Government offices
| Preceded by Sir John Sutton | Lieutenant Governor of Jersey; 1995–2001 | Succeeded by Sir John Cheshire |
