= Murray Naylor =

British Army general

Major General Murray Naylor CB MBE DL
- Born: 5 March 1938 (age 88)
- Military career
- Allegiance: United Kingdom
- Branch: British Army
- Service years: 1956–1992
- Rank: Major General
- Service number: 453147
- Commands: 2nd Division; 22nd Armoured Brigade; 2nd Battalion Scots Guards
- Conflicts: Operation Banner
- Awards: Companion of the Order of the Bath; Member of the Order of the British Empire

Major General David Murray Naylor, CB, MBE, DL (born 5 March 1938) is a former British Army officer who commanded the 2nd Infantry Division from 1987 to 1989.

== Military career ==
Educated at Eton College, Naylor enlisted for national service in 1956 and was commissioned into the Scots Guards the following year. As a major he was appointed a Member of the Order of the British Empire in the 1973 New Year Honours. He was appointed commanding officer of the 2nd Battalion Scots Guards in 1976 and led his battalion on active service in Northern Ireland during the Troubles. He was made Assistant Director on the Defence Policy Staff at the Ministry of Defence in 1980, commander of the 22nd Armoured Brigade in Germany in 1982 and Deputy Military Secretary at the Ministry of Defence in 1985. He went on to be General Officer Commanding North East District and commander 2nd Infantry Division based in York in 1987 and Director of the Territitorial Army and Organisation at the Ministry of Defence in 1989 before retiring in 1992.

In retirement Naylor became Chairman of the North Yorkshire Ambulance Service and, more recently, Chairman of the Kohima Education Trust. He was a County Councillor for North Yorkshire representing Rillington from 1997 to 2005, and is a Deputy Lieutenant of North Yorkshire. He is also author of the book Among Friends: Scots Guards 1956–93.

== Family ==
In 1965 Naylor married Rosemary Gillian Beach; they have three sons.

Military offices
| Preceded by Charles Guthrie | General Officer Commanding North East District and Commander 2nd Infantry Division; 1987–1989 | Succeeded by Michael Rose |
