= Geoffrey Armitage =

British Army officer

Major-General Geoffrey Armitage CBE
- Born: 5 July 1917
- Died: 23 June 1996 (aged 78)
- Military career
- Allegiance: United Kingdom
- Branch: British Army
- Rank: Major-General
- Service number: 73009
- Unit: Royal Artillery
- Commands: Royal Armoured Corps Centre; North East District
- Conflicts: Second World War
- Awards: Commander of the Order of the British Empire; Military Cross

Major-General Geoffrey Thomas Alexander Armitage CBE (5 July 1917 – 23 June 1996) was a British Army officer.

== Military career ==
Educated at Haileybury, Armitage was commissioned into the Royal Artillery on 26 August 1937 and served as a war substantive captain in the Second World War. He became Commandant, Royal Armoured Corps Centre in 1962, Chief of Staff, I (British) Corps in 1966 and General Officer Commanding, North East District in August 1970 before retiring in January 1973.

Military offices
Preceded by John Ward-Harrison	GOC North East District; 1970–1973	Succeeded by John Ward-Harrison
