= John Waters (British Army officer, born 1935) =

British Army general (1935–2025)

General Sir John Waters GCB CBE
- Born: 2 September 1935; Rangoon, British Burma
- Died: 29 January 2025 (aged 89)
- Military career
- Allegiance: United Kingdom
- Branch: British Army
- Service years: 1956–1994
- Rank: General
- Service number: 445998
- Unit: Gloucestershire Regiment
- Commands: Land Forces; Headquarters Northern Ireland; Staff College, Camberley; 4th Armoured Division; 3rd Infantry Brigade; 1st Battalion, Gloucestershire Regiment
- Conflicts: Cyprus Emergency; Falklands War; Operation Banner
- Awards: Knight Grand Cross of the Order of the Bath; Commander of the Order of the British Empire

General Sir Charles John Waters, GCB, CBE (2 September 1935 – 29 January 2025) was a British Army officer who served as Commander-in-Chief, Land Forces from 1990 to 1993.

== Military career ==
Waters was born in Rangoon, British Burma on 2 September 1935. Educated at Oundle School, Waters was commissioned into the Gloucestershire Regiment in February 1956. He was made commanding officer of the 1st Battalion Gloucestershire Regiment in 1975. He was appointed commander of the 3rd Infantry Brigade in 1979, Deputy Commander of Land Forces in the Falklands during the Falklands War in 1982 and General Officer Commanding 4th Armoured Division in 1983. He went on to be commandant of the Staff College, Camberley, in 1986, General Officer Commanding Northern Ireland in 1988 and Commander in Chief, UK Land Forces in 1990. Finally he was made Deputy Supreme Allied Commander Europe from 1993 until 1994 when he retired.

== Later career ==
In retirement, Waters was Deputy Chairman of the National Army Museum. He was also the Honorary Colonel of the Royal Wessex Yeomanry from 1992 to 1997.

== Death ==
Waters died on 29 January 2025, at the age of 89.

Military offices
Preceded by Jeremy Reilly	GOC 4th Armoured Division; 1983–1985	Succeeded by Michael Hobbs
Preceded by Patrick Palmer	Commandant of the Staff College, Camberley; 1986–1988	Succeeded by John Learmont
Preceded by Sir Robert Pascoe	GOC British Army in Northern Ireland; 1988–1990	Succeeded by Sir John Wilsey
Preceded by Sir Charles Huxtable	Commander-in-Chief, Land Forces; 1990–1993	Succeeded by Sir John Wilsey
Preceded by Sir Brian Kenny	Deputy Supreme Allied Commander Europe; With Dieter Clauss; 1993–1994	Succeeded by Sir Jeremy Mackenzie
