= John Learmont =

British Army general (born 1934)

General Sir John Learmont KCB CBE
- Born: 10 March 1934 (age 92)
- Military career
- Allegiance: United Kingdom
- Branch: British Army
- Service years: 1954–1994
- Rank: General
- Commands: Staff College, Camberley
- Conflicts: Operation Banner
- Awards: Knight Commander of the Order of the Bath; Commander of the Order of the British Empire; Mentioned in Despatches

General Sir John Hartley Learmont, KCB, CBE (born 10 March 1934) is a former British Army officer who served as Quartermaster-General to the Forces.

== Military career ==
Learmont was commissioned into the Royal Artillery in 1954. He commanded 1st Regiment Royal Horse Artillery (1 RHA) in Northern Ireland during The Troubles and was mentioned in despatches in 1975.

In 1985 Learmont was appointed Commander Royal Artillery for 1st (British) Corps, and in 1987 he became chief of staff at Headquarters UK Land Forces. He was appointed commandant of the Staff College, Camberley in 1988, and then became Military Secretary in 1989. His final appointment was as Quartermaster-General to the Forces in 1991; he retired in 1994.

Learmont was also Colonel Commandant of the Army Air Corps, and the Royal Horse Artillery.

In retirement Learmont prepared a report following the escape in January 1995 of three prisoners from Parkhurst Prison.

== Honours ==
Learmont was appointed an Officer of the Order of the British Empire (OBE) in the 1976 Birthday Honours, promoted to Commander of the Order (CBE) in the 1980 Birthday Honours, and appointed a Knight Commander of the Order of the Bath (KCB) in the 1989 Birthday Honours.

Military offices
Preceded by John Waters	Commandant of the Staff College, Camberley; 1988–1989	Succeeded by Jeremy Mackenzie
Preceded by Sir Patrick Palmer	Military Secretary; 1989–1991	Succeeded by Sir William Rous
Preceded by Sir Edward Jones	Quartermaster-General to the Forces; 1991–1994	Succeeded by Sir William Rous
