= Rainer Feist =

German naval officer

- Born: 12 April 1945; Cuxhaven, Germany
- Died: 19 May 2007 (aged 62); Timmendorfer Strand, Germany
- Military career
- Allegiance: West Germany; NATO
- Branch: German Navy
- Service years: 1966–2004
- Rank: Admiral
- Commands: 2002–2004; Deputy Supreme Allied Commander Europe (DSACEUR) in NATO

Admiral Rainer Feist (12 April 1945 – 19 May 2007) was an officer in the German Navy until his retirement in 2004.

== Military career ==
Feist was born in Cuxhaven, Lower Saxony. He enlisted in the Bundeswehr in 1966 as an officer cadet and graduated from Naval Academy Mürwik in 1968. After that he served on board fast attack craft and destroyers. From 1974 he was trained as an antisubmarine warfare officer, and later undertook the admiral staff course at the Bundeswehr Command and Staff College in Hamburg. In 1979 Feist became the commanding officer of the guided-missile fast attack craft Greif.

From then on Feist served as assistant branch chief of "Politico-Military Affairs" at the German Ministry of Defence in Bonn (1981–1983) and as branch chief of "Planning" at the Allied Command Baltic Approaches (BALTAP) in Denmark (1984–1987). He commanded the 2nd Fast Attack Craft Squadron based in Olpenitz between 1987 and 1990 and was instructor at the Bundeswehr Command and Staff College. This was followed by a service run at the Armed Forces Staff, Federal Ministry of Defence in Bonn as branch chief of "Politico-Military Affairs".

Further assignments led Feist to SHAPE in Belgium, the German Fleet Command in Glücksburg, and the Military District Command I, Kiel.

Feist was promoted to the rank of vice admiral in October 2000, when he became vice chief of defence and commissioner for reserve affairs in the Bundeswehr.

Feist was promoted to the rank of admiral (four stars) in 2002, thus becoming the highest-ranking officer in the German Navy, and he was appointed Deputy Supreme Allied Commander Europe (DSACEUR). He held that position until 2004. In addition, he was named operation commander for the European Union-led mission, Operation Concordia, to the Republic of Macedonia in February 2003.

Feist was retired from active duty by Federal Minister for Defence, Peter Struck, on 15 September 2004. A Großer Zapfenstreich was held in recognition of his service.

Feist died in Timmendorfer Strand due to cancer. He is survived by his wife Heidi and two sons.

Military offices
Preceded by Dieter Stöckmann	Deputy Supreme Allied Commander Europe; 2002–2004	Succeeded by General Sir John Reith
Preceded by Generalleutnant Hartmut Moede	Deputy Chief of Staff of the Federal Armed Forces; October 2000–September 2002	Succeeded by Generalleutnant Dirk Böcker
