= Geoffrey Collin =

British Army general (1921–2009)

Major-General Geoffrey Collin CB MC DL
- Born: 18 July 1921; Kandy, Ceylon
- Died: 14 February 2009 (aged 87)
- Military career
- Allegiance: United Kingdom
- Branch: British Army
- Rank: Major-General
- Commands: 50 Missile Regiment; Royal School of Artillery; North East District
- Conflicts: Second World War
- Awards: Companion of the Order of the Bath; Military Cross

Major-General Geoffrey de Egglesfield Collin CB MC DL (18 July 1921 – 14 February 2009) was a British Army officer.

== Military career ==
Educated at Wellington College, Collin was commissioned into the Royal Artillery in July 1941 and saw action at the Battle of Imphal in July 1944 during the Second World War. He became commanding officer of 50 Missile Regiment in the British Army of the Rhine in 1962. He went on to be Commander, Royal Artillery for 4th Division in 1966, Commandant, Royal School of Artillery in 1969 and Major-General, Royal Artillery in 1971. His last appointment was as General Officer Commanding North East District in 1973 before retiring in 1976.

In 1949, he married Angela Stella Young; they had one son and three daughters.

Military offices
Preceded by John Ward-Harrison	General Officer Commanding North East District; 1973–1976	Succeeded by Henry Woods
