= Patrick Palmer (British Army officer) =

British Army general (1933–1999)

General Sir Patrick Palmer KCVO KBE
- Born: 29 April 1933
- Died: 23 November 1999 (aged 66)
- Military career
- Allegiance: United Kingdom
- Branch: British Army
- Service years: 1950–1992
- Rank: General
- Commands: Allied Forces Northern Europe (1989–1992); Staff College, Camberley (1984–1986); 2nd Infantry Division (1983–1984); North East District (1982–1984); 7th Armoured Brigade (1977–1980); 1st Battalion, Argyll and Sutherland Highlanders (1972–1974)
- Conflicts: Indonesia–Malaysia confrontation Aden Emergency
- Awards: Knight Commander of the Royal Victorian Order; Knight Commander of the Order of the British Empire
- Other work: Constable and Governor of Windsor Castle

General Sir Charles Patrick Ralph Palmer, KCVO, KBE (29 April 1933 – 23 November 1999) was a senior British Army officer. He served as Commander-in-Chief, Allied Forces Northern Europe from 1989 to 1992 and Constable and Governor of Windsor Castle from 1992 to 1999.

== Military career ==
Educated at Marlborough College and the Royal Military Academy Sandhurst, Palmer was commissioned into the Argyll and Sutherland Highlanders in 1953. He went on to serve in British Guiana, Suez and Cyprus. He returned to Sandhurst as an instructor in 1961 and then served with his regiment in Borneo and then Aden. After a spell in Whitehall, he returned to the Argyll and Sutherland Highlanders as commanding officer of the 1st Battalion from 1972 to 1974. In 1977 he became commander of the 7th Armoured Brigade.

In 1980 Palmer was given command of the British Army Advisory Training Team in Zimbabwe, advising President Robert Mugabe. In 1982 he was appointed General Officer Commanding North East District, in 1983 he was dual-hatted as General Officer Commanding North East District and Commander 2nd Infantry Division and in 1984 he was made Commandant of the Staff College, Camberley. In 1986 he became Military Secretary and in 1989 he was promoted to full general and became Commander-in-Chief Allied Forces Northern Europe before retiring in 1992. In 1988 he took the Grand Day general salute at the Duke of York's Royal Military School, Dover.

From 1982 to 1992 Palmer was also Colonel of the Argyll and Sutherland Highlanders.

== Later life ==
Palmer was the Constable and Governor of Windsor Castle from 1992 to 1999. After the great fire in 1992 he co-ordinated much of the re-building work. He retired from this position due to ill health in 1999 and was succeeded by Air Marshal Sir Richard Johns. Before his retirement he was appointed a Knight Commander of the Royal Victorian Order on 13 August 1999.

== Family ==
In 1960 Palmer married Sonia Wigglesworth; they had one son. Following the death of his first wife, he married Joanna Baines in 1966; they had two daughters.

Military offices
Preceded by Ian Baker	General Officer Commanding North East District; 1982–1984	Succeeded by Peter Inge
Preceded by Martin Farndale (as GOC 2nd Armoured Division)	GOC 2nd Infantry Division; 1983–1984	Succeeded by Peter Inge
Preceded by John Akehurst	Commandant of the Staff College, Camberley; 1984–1986	Succeeded by John Waters
Preceded by Sir David Mostyn	Military Secretary; 1986–1989	Succeeded by Sir John Learmont
Preceded by Sir Geoffrey Howlett	C-in-C Allied Forces Northern Europe; 1989–1992	Succeeded by Sir Garry Johnson
Honorary titles
Preceded by Sir David Hallifax	Constable and Governor of Windsor Castle; 1992–1999	Succeeded by Sir Richard Johns
