= Jeremy Mackenzie =

British Army general (born 1941)

General Sir Jeremy Mackenzie GCB OBE DL
- Born: 11 February 1941 (age 85); Nairobi, Kenya
- Military career
- Allegiance: United Kingdom
- Branch: British Army
- Service years: 1959–1999
- Rank: General
- Commands: Deputy Supreme Allied Commander Europe (1994–1998); Allied Command Europe Rapid Reaction Corps (1992–1994); 1st British Corps (1991–1992); 4th Armoured Division (1989–1991); Staff College, Camberley (1989); 12th Armoured Brigade (1984–1986); 1st Battalion Queen’s Own Highlanders (1980–1981)
- Conflicts: Brunei Rebellion; The Troubles; Bosnian War
- Awards: Knight Grand Cross of the Order of the Bath; Officer of the Order of the British Empire; Mentioned in Despatches; Officer of the Legion of Merit (United States); Cross of Merit First Class (Czech Republic); Officer's Cross of the Order of Merit (Hungary)

General Sir Jeremy John George Mackenzie, GCB, OBE, DL (born 11 February 1941) is a retired senior British Army officer who served as Deputy Supreme Allied Commander Europe from 1994 to 1998. Mackenzie was born in the Kenya Colony and, after attending the Royal Military Academy Sandhurst, joined the British Army's Queen's Own Highlanders. He became battalion commander in 1980 and a brigadier in 1984, commanding the 12th Armoured Brigade. In 1989 he was promoted to major-general and commanded the 4th Armoured Division and then the 1st (British) Corps. In 1992 he became the first commander of the Allied Rapid Reaction Corps and was promoted to general in 1994. He retired in 1999.

== Early life ==
Mackenzie was born on 11 February 1941 in Nairobi, Kenya, the son of Lieutenant Colonel John W.E. Mackenzie of the Seaforth Highlanders. He was educated at the Duke of York School, Nairobi and the Royal Military Academy Sandhurst.

== Military career ==
Mackenzie was commissioned into the Queen’s Own Highlanders in July 1961, and posted to the 1st Battalion in Singapore. He took part in putting down the Brunei Rebellion in 1962 and later served in a training capacity with the SAS. He was appointed commanding officer of the 1st Battalion in 1980. After graduating from the Staff College, Camberley, he was made a Company Commander with the Argyll and Sutherland Highlanders in Northern Ireland and Brigade Major of the 24th Airportable Brigade. He was then second-in-command of the Queen’s Own Highlanders in South Armagh, being obliged to take command when the commanding officer was killed in the Warrenpoint ambush of 1979.

In 1980/1981 he commanded the 1st Battalion Queen's Own Highlanders in Hong Kong and was appointed an Officer of the Order of the British Empire. He then spent a few years as an instructor at the Army Staff College, Camberley and served on the Staff at the Ministry of Defence as a colonel. In 1984 he was promoted brigadier and made Commander of the 12th Armoured Brigade and, from March 1989, Commandant of the Staff College, Camberley. He then was made major general and General Officer Commanding 4th Armoured Division in December 1989, and on 2 December 1991 appointed the last Commander of 1st (British) Corps with the acting rank of lieutenant general. He was knighted as a Knight Commander of the Order of the Bath in December 1991.

In 1992 he formed the Allied Command Europe Rapid Reaction Corps and became its first Commander. In 1994 he was promoted full general in 1994 and given the post of Deputy Supreme Allied Commander Europe with special responsibility for the Partnership for Peace Program and the Expansion of NATO, and responsible for coordinating 52,000 troops from 34 nations who moved into Bosnia and Herzegovina. He was also given the colonelcy of the Highlanders (Seaforth, Gordons and Camerons) from 1994 to 2001.

He was made a Knight Grand Cross of the Order of the Bath in 1999, having previously been awarded the US Legion of Merit twice in 1997 and 1999, the Czech Republic's Cross of Merit First Class, and the Officer's Cross of the Order of Merit of the Republic of Hungary in 1998. He was also an Aide de Camp General to the Queen from 1992 to 1996, Governor of the Royal Hospital Chelsea from August 1999 to September 2006, and a Deputy Lieutenant of Greater London. He retired from the army in 1999.

== Retirement ==
In retirement Mackenzie became chairman of UK Gear (a footwear manufacturer), and chairman of AC Cars (a car manufacturer). He also became a director of Blue Hackle (a security business).

== Private life ==
He married Elizabeth Lyon (née Wertenbaker) and has a son and a daughter.

Military offices
Preceded by John Learmont	Commandant of the Staff College, Camberley; March–December 1989	Succeeded by William Rous
Preceded by William Rous	GOC 4th Armoured Division; 1989–1991	Succeeded by Anthony Denison-Smith
Preceded by Sir Charles Guthrie	GOC 1st (British) Corps; 1991–1992	Post disbanded
New title	Commander Allied Command Europe Rapid Reaction Corps; 1992–1994	Succeeded by Sir Michael Walker
Preceded by Sir John Waters	Deputy Supreme Allied Commander Europe; 1994–1998	Succeeded by Sir Rupert Smith
Honorary titles
Preceded by Sir Brian Kenny	Governor, Royal Hospital Chelsea; 1999–2006	Succeeded by The Lord Walker of Aldringham
