= Dieter Stöckmann =

German general

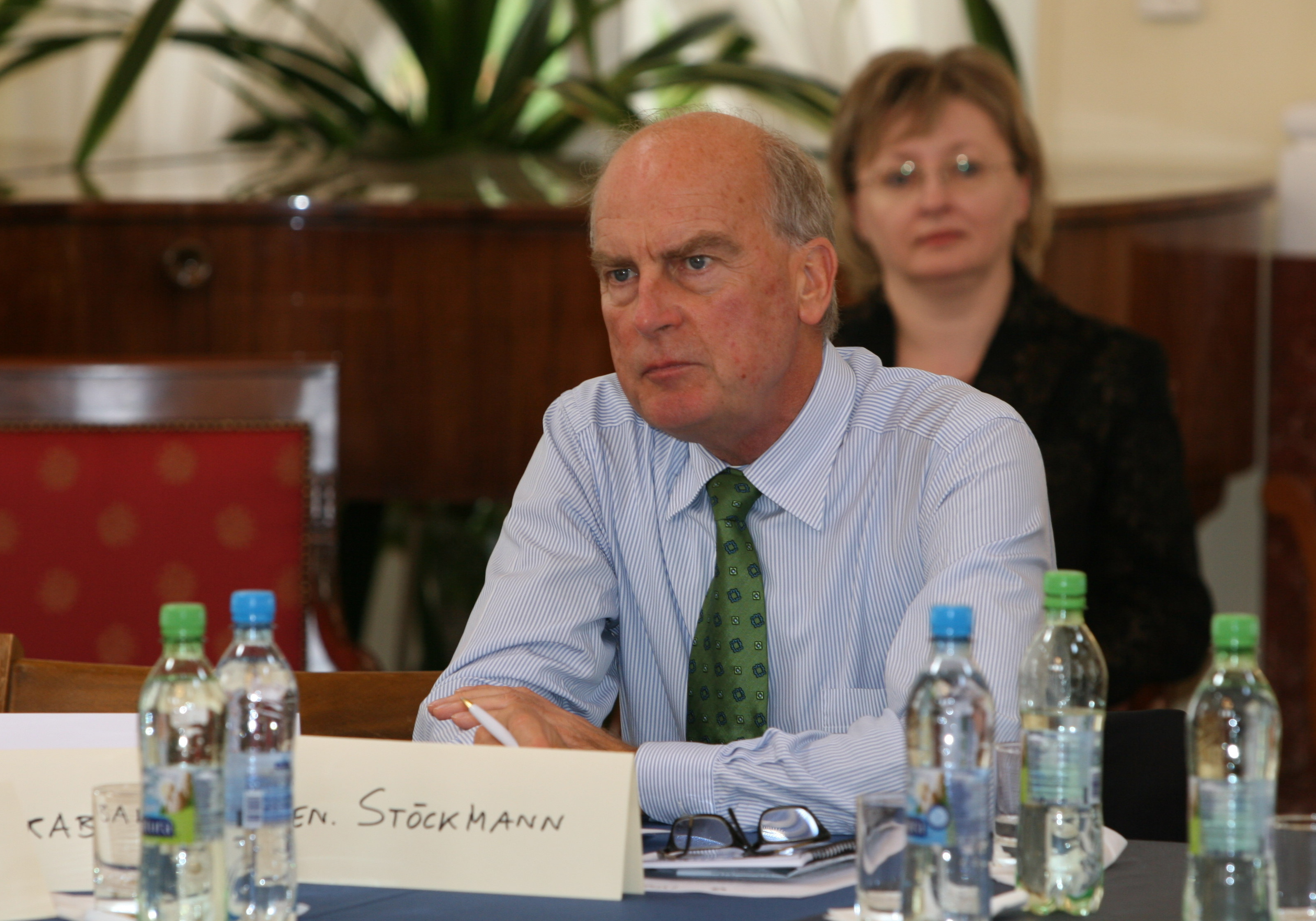
- Dieter Stöckmann in 2007
- Born: 29 July 1941 (age 85); Stolp, Gau Pomerania, German Reich
- Military career
- Allegiance: Germany
- Service years: 1961 - 2002
- Rank: General
- Commands: Panzerbrigade 15; 5 Panzerdivision; Joint Force Command Brunssum

Dieter Stöckmann (born 29 July 1941) is a retired German general of the Bundeswehr. He was Commander-in-Chief, Allied Forces Central Europe from 1996 to 1998.

== Biography ==
Stöckmann was born in Stolp, Pomerania (today Słupsk, Poland). His family was expelled from Stolp after World War II and he grew up in Jever, Germany.

After passing his Abitur in 1961, he joined the Bundeswehr as an officer cadet in a Panzergrenadier battalion. Stöckmann attended his General Staff Training Course at the Führungsakademie der Bundeswehr in 1972 - 1974 and served at the General Army Office. In 1976 - 1978 he attended the General Staff Training Course at the Royal Dutch Military Academy in The Hague, the Netherlands.

After serving with the Panzergrenadiers he became the adjutant to the Chief of Staff of the German Army in 1982 and to the Chief of Staff of the Federal Armed Forces in 1984.

Stöckmann commanded Panzerbrigade 15 in Koblenz from 1986 to 1989 and became the Head of the Personnel, Training and Leadership Development Department at Army Headquarters in Bonn. He commanded the 5 Panzerdivision in Diez on the Lahn in 1991-1993 and was promoted to Generalleutnant in 1993, when he was appointed the Chief of Staff and Deputy Commander at the Headquarters of the Allied Land Forces Central Europe in Heidelberg.

In 1996, now with the rank of a General, he became Commander-in-Chief, Allied Forces Central Europe (CINCCENT) and the Chief of Staff of Supreme Headquarters Allied Powers Europe (SHAPE) on 1 April 1998. On 17 September 2001 Stöckmann was promoted to Deputy Commander, Supreme Allied Command Europe, a position he held until his retirement on 30 September 2002.

General (ret.) Stöckmann is a Member of the Board of Advisors of the Global Panel Foundation (Berlin, Copenhagen, Prague, Sydney and Toronto) - a respected foundation which works behind-the-scenes in conflict areas around the world.

He is married and has a son and two daughters.

Military offices
Preceded by Generalmajor Peter Rohde	Commander of 5. Panzer-Division (Bundeswehr); 1 October 1991 – 24 June 1993	Succeeded by Brigadegeneral Klaus von Heimendahl
Preceded by Joachim Spiering	Commander in Chief, Allied Forces Central Europe (NATO); March 1996 – 30 March 1998	Succeeded by Helge Hansen
Preceded by General Sir Rupert Smith	Deputy Supreme Allied Commander Europe; 2001–2002	Succeeded by Rainer Feist
