= Michael Hobbs (British Army officer) =

British Army general (1937–2026)

Major-General Sir Michael Hobbs KCVO CBE
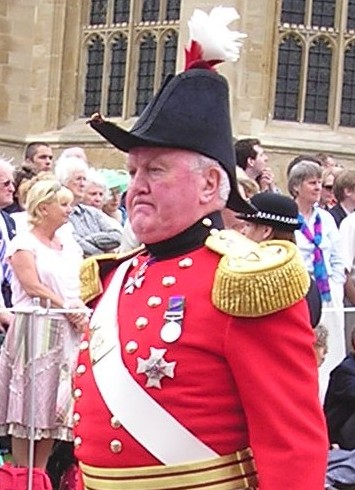
- Hobbs in the procession to the Garter service at St George's Chapel, Windsor, in 2006
- Born: 28 February 1937; Farnborough, Hampshire, England
- Died: 19 October 2026 (aged 89)
- Military career
- Allegiance: United Kingdom
- Branch: British Army
- Service years: 1956–1988
- Rank: Major-General
- Service number: 447271
- Commands: 39th Infantry Brigade; 4th Armoured Division
- Awards: Knight Commander of the Royal Victorian Order; Commander of the Order of the British Empire; Mentioned in Dispatches

Major-General Sir Michael Frederick Hobbs KCVO CBE (28 February 1937 – 19 October 2026) was a British Army officer, who was later a charity director and Governor of the Military Knights of Windsor.

== Early life and military career ==
Michael Frederick Hobbs was born in Farnborough, Hampshire, England, on 28 February 1937. Educated at Eton College, Hobbs was commissioned into the Grenadier Guards on 14 April 1956 as a second lieutenant to fulfil his national service obligation. He was promoted to lieutenant on 28 February 1958 and was removed from the national service list. On 28 February 1964, he was promoted to captain, and to major on 31 December 1969. He served on the Directing Staff of Staff College, Camberley between 1974 and 1977. In 1979, during The Troubles, he was posted to Northern Ireland.

On 30 June 1980, Hobbs was promoted to colonel, and to brigadier on 31 December 1981. He was appointed Commander of the 39th Infantry Brigade in 1982. He was posted again to Northern Ireland in 1983 as part of the Staff. He was appointed Director of Army Public Relations at the Ministry of Defence and served there from January 1984 to July 1985. He was General Officer Commanding 4th Armoured Division between December 1985 and November 1987. On 29 March 1986, he was promoted to major-general with seniority from 22 June 1984.

Hobbs retired on 23 February 1988.

== Later life ==
Hobbs also held the positions of both Director of the Duke of Edinburgh's Award between 1988 and 1998 and a Director of the Outward Bound Trust from 1995. He was a director of the London Law Trust, a grant making charitable trust, and served as the Deputy Chairman of the Development Committee of the College of St. George.

He became the Governor of the Military Knights of Windsor in 2000 and retired from this post in July 2012.

== Personal life and death ==
Hobbs was married to Tessa. Lady Hobbs is an internationally renowned garden designer. In 2000, his son William Hobbs was jailed for killing a cyclist whilst drink-driving. The 21-year-old was sentenced to four and a half years.

His grandmother was a lady in waiting to Queen Mary wife of George V.

Hobbs died on 19 October 2026, aged 89.

== Awards and decorations ==

Knight Commander of the Royal Victorian Order (KCVO)	1998 Birthday Honours
Commander of the Order of the British Empire (CBE)	1982 Birthday Honours
Officer of the Order of the British Empire (OBE)	9 October 1979
Member of the Order of the British Empire (MBE)	1974 Birthday Honours
Officer of the Order of St John	15 April 1994
General Service Medal with bronze palm for Mentioned in Dispatches	With 'Northern Ireland' clasp, (MID) 1983
Queen Elizabeth II Silver Jubilee Medal	1977
Queen Elizabeth II Golden Jubilee Medal	2002
Queen Elizabeth II Diamond Jubilee Medal	2012

Military offices
Preceded by John Waters	General Officer Commanding the 4th Armoured Division; 1985–1987	Succeeded by William Rous
