= Charles Guthrie, Baron Guthrie of Craigiebank =

British army officer (1938–2025)

Field Marshal The Right Honourable The Lord Guthrie of Craigiebank GCB GCVO OBE DL
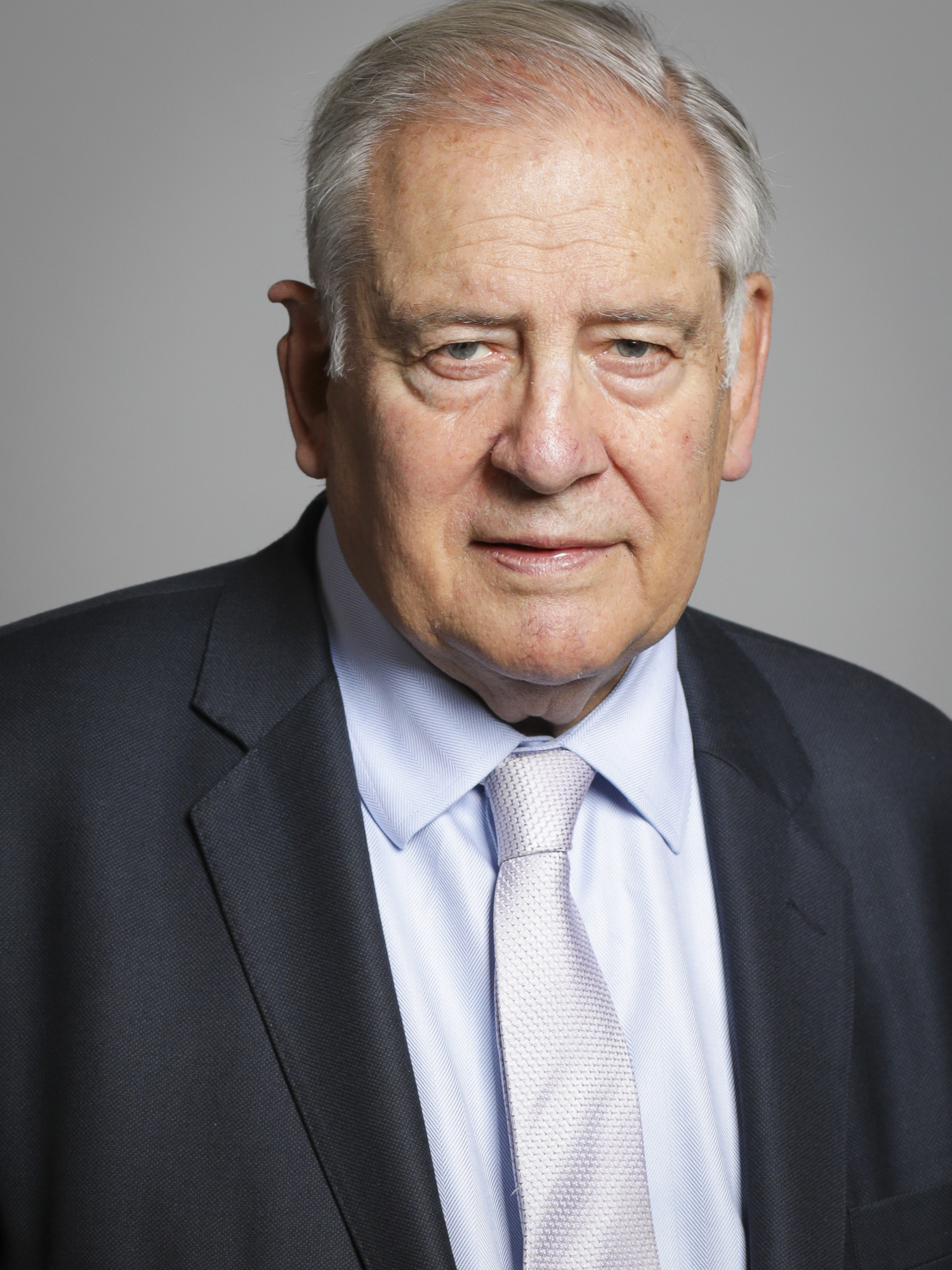
- Official portrait, 2019
- Born: 17 November 1938; Chelsea, London, England
- Died: 18 September 2025 (aged 86)
- Education: Royal Military Academy Sandhurst
- Relatives

Member of the House of Lords
- Lord Temporal
- Life peerage 27 June 2001 – 1 December 2020

Personal details
- Party: Crossbencher
- Military career
- Allegiance: United Kingdom
- Branch: British Army
- Service years: 1959–2001
- Rank: Field Marshal
- Service number: 461440
- Unit: Welsh Guards
- Commands: Chief of the Defence Staff; Chief of the General Staff; British Army of the Rhine; 1st British Corps; 2nd Infantry Division; 4th Armoured Brigade; 1st Battalion, Welsh Guards
- Conflicts: Operation Banner; Bosnian War; Kosovo War
- Awards: Knight Grand Cross of the Order of the Bath; Knight Grand Cross of the Royal Victorian Order; Officer of the Order of the British Empire

Field Marshal Charles Ronald Llewelyn Guthrie, Baron Guthrie of Craigiebank, GCB, GCVO, OBE, DL (17 November 1938 – 18 September 2025) was a senior officer of the British Army who served as Chief of the General Staff from 1994 to 1997 and Chief of the Defence Staff from 1997 until his retirement in 2001.

Guthrie's military career saw service with the Welsh Guards and the Special Air Service; he was closely involved in military operations in Northern Ireland and provided advice to the British Government during the Bosnian War and the Kosovo War.

== Early life ==
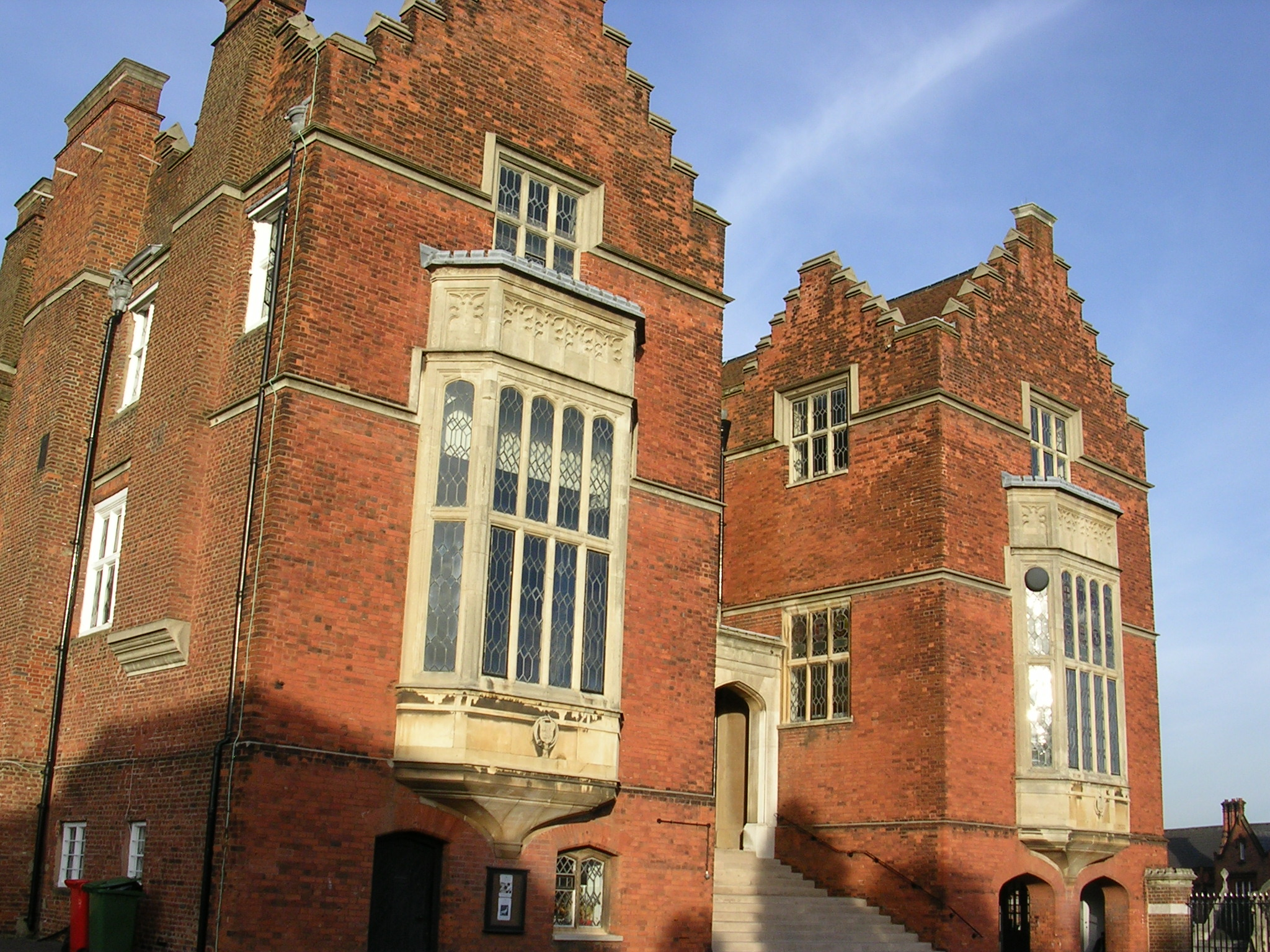
Harrow School, Guthrie's alma mater

Born in Chelsea, London, into a Scottish landed family, Guthrie was the elder son of Major Ronald Guthrie and Nina née Llewelyn. He was educated at Harrow School and the Royal Military Academy, Sandhurst.

== Army career ==
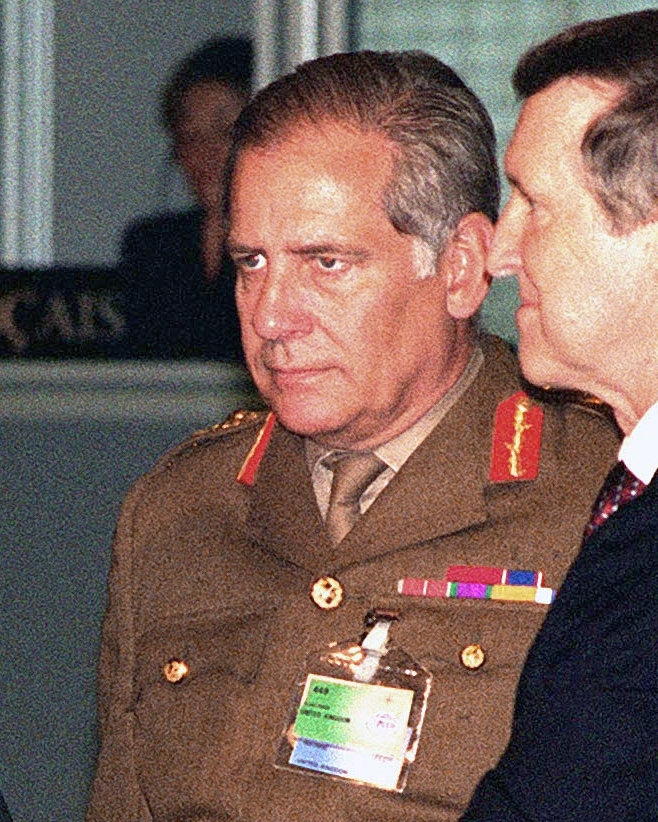
General Guthrie meeting Defence Ministers in 1997

Guthrie was commissioned into the Welsh Guards on 25 July 1959. He was promoted to lieutenant on 1 June 1961 and captain on 25 July 1965. In 1966 he became a troop commander with 22 Special Air Service Regiment serving in Aden, the Persian Gulf, Malaysia and East Africa and then in 1968 he became a squadron commander with 22 Special Air Service Regiment serving in the Persian Gulf and the United Kingdom. He returned to the Welsh Guards in Münster in 1970 and, following his promotion to major on 31 December 1970, he was given command of a mechanised infantry company in the 1st Battalion. He became military assistant to the chief of the general staff in 1973 and, following a year as second in command of 1st Battalion Welsh Guards in London and Cyprus and having been promoted to lieutenant colonel on 31 December 1975, he became brigade major for the Household Division in 1976. Guthrie was appointed a Member of the Royal Victorian Order (MVO fourth class) in the 1977 Silver Jubilee and Birthday Honours; on 31 December 1984 this rank was reclassified as lieutenant (LVO).

Guthrie was appointed commanding officer of 1st Battalion Welsh Guards in 1977 in which role he was deployed to Berlin. Promoted to colonel on 31 December 1979, he undertook a tour of duty in Northern Ireland in Spring 1980 for which he was appointed an Officer of the Order of the British Empire. In 1980 he was also briefly commander of British Forces in the New Hebrides. He then spent two years as colonel on the general staff for military operations at the Ministry of Defence. Promoted to brigadier on 31 December 1981, he became brigade commander of 4th Armoured Brigade in 1982. In 1984 he was made chief of staff for 1st British Corps in Bielefeld. Following his appointment as general officer commanding (GOC) North East District and Commander 2nd Infantry Division based in York on 18 January 1986, he was given the substantive rank of major general on 31 March 1986.

On 24 November 1987, Guthrie became assistant chief of the general staff at the Ministry of Defence. On 2 October 1989 he was promoted to lieutenant general and appointed GOC 1st British Corps, and, having been appointed a Knight Commander of the Order of the Bath in the 1990 New Year Honours, he relinquished his command on 2 December 1991.

Guthrie was appointed commander of Northern Army Group and British Army of the Rhine on 7 January 1992 and, following promotion to (full) general on 14 February 1992, became ADC to the Queen on 13 July 1993.

Guthrie then became Chief of the General Staff (CGS) on 15 March 1994, being advanced to a Knight Grand Cross of the Order of the Bath in the Queen's Birthday Honours 1994. As CGS, he was responsible for providing strategic military advice to the British Government on the deployment of troops for the Bosnian War, and in 1996 updated the British military doctrine.

Guthrie went on to become Chief of the Defence Staff on 2 April 1997. In that position, he advised the British Government on the conduct of the Kosovo War. He also warned against a British invasion of Zimbabwe to undertake regime change against Robert Mugabe, saying "Hold hard, you'll make it worse."

Guthrie retired from the British Army in 2001.

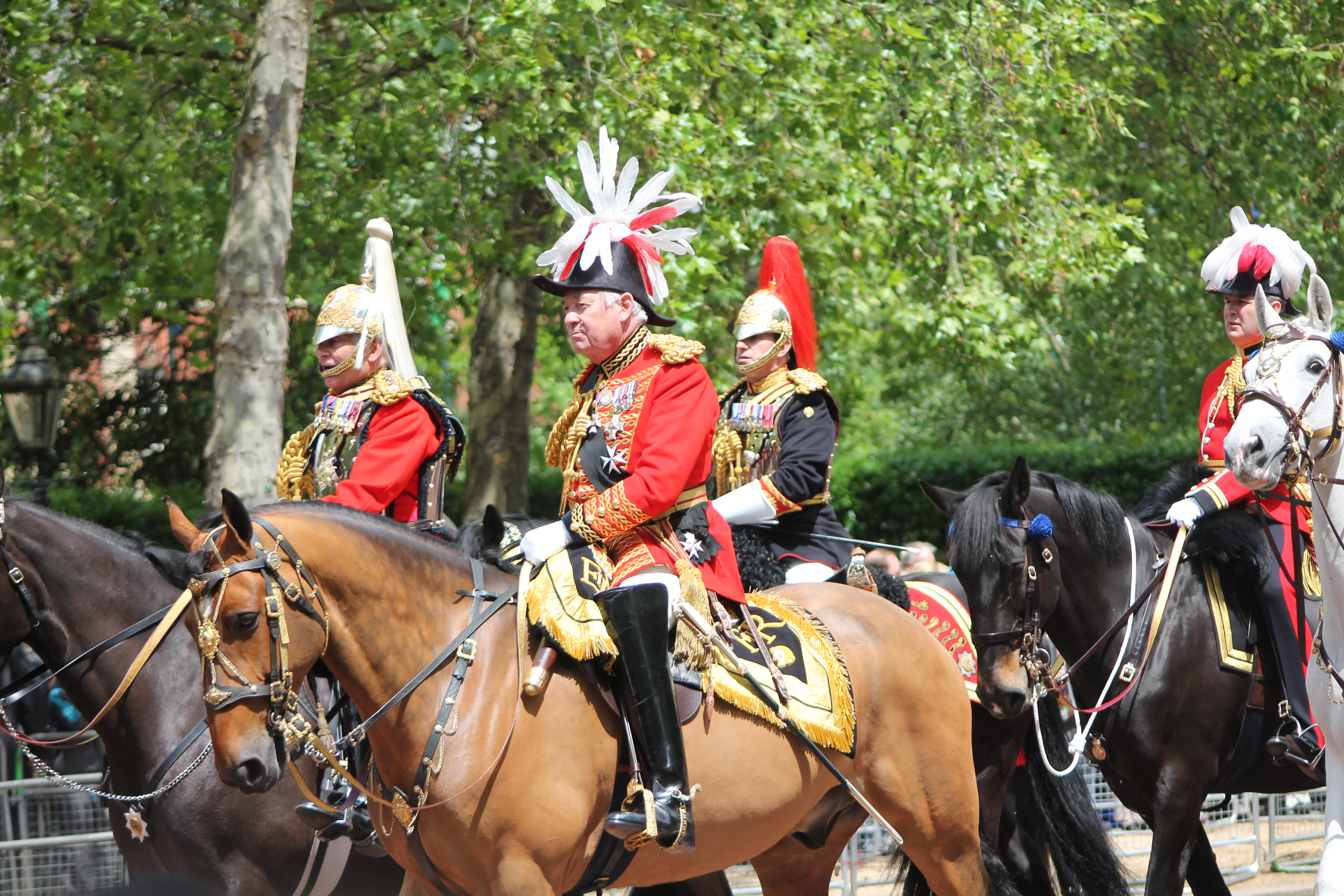
Lord Guthrie (left) riding in the 2012 Trooping the Colour as colonel of The Life Guards

Guthrie was appointed colonel commandant of the Intelligence Corps on 1 March 1986 and colonel commandant of the Special Air Service in 2000. For twenty years he served as colonel of The Life Guards and Gold Stick-in-Waiting to The Queen, from 1 January 1999 to 7 June 2019.

== Post-career activities ==
After retiring from the British Army, he was created a life peer as Baron Guthrie of Craigiebank, of Craigiebank in the Dundee City council area, in June 2001. Lord Guthrie sat as a crossbencher in the House of Lords. He was one of several retired Chiefs of Defence Staff who spoke out in the House of Lords about the risk to servicemen facing liability for their actions before the International Criminal Court, particularly with respect to the invasion of Iraq. George Monbiot criticised Guthrie for an alleged lack of understanding of international law. Monbiot based his argument on Guthrie's September 2002 statement for an invasion of Iraq and subsequent comments, in which he appeared to support launching "surprise wars", something forbidden by the United Nations Charter. Guthrie disagreed publicly with Prime Minister Gordon Brown in 2008 over military funding.

In 2007 Guthrie co-authored a book on ethics in modern warfare with Sir Michael Quinlan, formerly Permanent Secretary of the Ministry of Defence.

Guthrie was promoted to the honorary rank of field marshal in June 2012.

Guthrie served as a non-executive director of Gulf Keystone Petroleum, Rivada Networks, Ashley Gardens Block 2 Ltd, Colt Defense LLC and Sciens Capital; he served as a director of N M Rothschild & Sons, Gulf Keystone, and Petropavlovsk PLC; he served as a non-executive chairman of Siboney Ltd.; he was a shareholder of Palantir Technologies and the global strategic intelligence firm Arcanum, which is a subsidiary of Magellen Investment Holdings. He was also a member of the Top Level Group of UK Parliamentarians for Multilateral Nuclear Disarmament and Non-proliferation, established in October 2009. He was president of several charities, including Action Medical Research, the Army Benevolent Fund, Soldier On!, and the Progressive Supranuclear Palsy Association. Until 2019, he was also the president of London Youth (Federation of London Youth Clubs). He was a Deputy Lieutenant for Dorset. Guthrie was one of several contributors to a 2013 book on public sector management. A Roman Catholic convert, Guthrie became a Knight of Malta and was a Patron of the Catholic homeless charities Cardinal Hume Centre and Caritas Anchor House. He became Chancellor of Liverpool Hope University in July 2013.

In August 2014, Lord Guthrie was one of 200 public figures who were signatories to a letter to The Guardian opposing Scottish independence in the run-up to September's referendum on that issue. He initially supported the continuance of the United Kingdom's presence in the European Union in the 2016 referendum on Britain's membership of the European Union, but suddenly switched to an advocacy of withdrawing from it less than a week before the vote was held, issuing a public warning of the ambitions inherent in the E.U. for the creation of a new "European Army", which he stated "would be a disaster". He is on the advisory board of Veterans for Britain an organization with the stated aim of supporting " Her Majesty's Government in the task of restoring full sovereign control to all aspects of the defence of the Realm " following the EU referendum.

From 1 August 2017, Lord Guthrie was the Senior Advisor to Ron Wahid, Chairman of Arcanum, a subsidiary of Magellan Investment Holdings. Established 23 March 2015, Magellan Investment Holdings is a holding company with investments in natural resources, energy, real estate, fine arts, aerospace and defense and technology. Magellan is the parent company of two subsidiaries: Arcanum, a global intelligence firm, and RJI Capital, a merchant banking and strategic advisory company.

On 9 June 2018, it was reported that, at the annual Trooping the Colour event, Lord Guthrie fell from his horse and had been admitted to hospital. On 8 January 2019, in an extraordinary intervention in the political sphere by figures from the military and intelligence services quarter, Guthrie sent a letter, co-signed by Sir Richard Dearlove, to Conservative Party Parliamentary Constituency Association Chairs, stating that the passage through the House of Commons of Prime Minister Theresa May's Withdrawal Agreement of the United Kingdom from the European Union contained decisions which fundamentally undermined the integrity of the Defence of the Realm, and requested they take measures to discourage their parliamentary representatives from voting for it imminently in the Commons. The letter as an alternative advocated the case upon national security grounds that the United Kingdom should fully withdraw from the European Union without an Intergovernmental relationship between the two persisting after the process.

On relinquishing his appointment as colonel of The Life Guards and Gold Stick-in-Waiting, The queen appointed Lord Guthrie a Knight Grand Cross of the Royal Victorian Order on 7 June 2019. On 1 December 2020, he retired from the House of Lords. His interests included tennis, opera and travel.

== Personal life and death ==
On 11 September 1971, Guthrie married Catherine Worrall, daughter of Lieutenant Colonel Claude Worrall, Coldstream Guards. The couple had two sons. She died from heart failure on 8 October 2022, at the age of 81. Guthrie's younger brother is James Guthrie, KC.

Guthrie died from a cerebral aneurysm on 18 September 2025, at the age of 86.

=== Arms ===
Lord Guthrie matriculated his family armorial bearings at the Lyon Office in 1999 (and in 2001 was granted supporters for life).

Coat of arms of Charles Guthrie, Baron Guthrie of Craigiebank
| Crest A Demi-lion Gules, armed and langued Azure, holding in its dexter Paw a Cross-Crosslet fitchée Azure. Escutcheon 1st and 4th, Argent, a Cross Sable; 2nd and 3rd, Argent, three Garbs Or, banded Gules, all within a bordure wavy Gules, charged with three Pheons Or. Supporters Dexter: a Lion Gules, armed and langued Azure, charged on the shoulder with a Pheon Or. Sinister: a Griffin Gules, winged, beaked, legged and armed Azure, charged on the shoulder with a Pheon Or. Motto Nec Timidus Nec Tumidus (Neither timid nor rash) |

=== Honours ===
Lord Guthrie's honours and decorations included:

| Knight Grand Cross of the Order of the Bath (GCB) | 1994 |
| Knight Commander of the Order of the Bath (KCB) | 1990 |
| Knight Grand Cross of the Royal Victorian Order (GCVO) | 2019 |
| Lieutenant of the Royal Victorian Order (LVO) | 1977 |
| Officer of the Order of the British Empire (OBE) | 1980 |
| Badge of Honour | 1980 (New Hebrides) |
| Officer of the Legion of Merit | 2001 (United States) |
| Knight Commander of the Order of St. Gregory the Great (KCSG) | 2008 (Holy See) |
| Knight of the Sovereign Military Order of Malta | 1999 (SMOM) |
| Knight Grand Cross of Justice of the Sacred Military Constantinian Order of Saint George (GCJCO) | 2013 (Two Sicilies) |
| Knight Commander of Justice of the Sacred Military Constantinian Order of Saint George (KCJCO) | 2003 (Two Sicilies) |
| Cross pro Merito Melitensi | (SMOM) |

As an Old Harrovian, and due to his seniority in the British Army, Harrow School's Combined Cadet Force contingent, the Harrow Rifle Corps, chose to name an annual inter-CCF competition in Guthrie's honour. The Guthrie Cup is a Section patrol competition, run for school CCFs in London District, supported by adult volunteers and cadets from the Harrow Rifle Corps and local Army Cadet Force detachments.

== See also ==
- Clan Guthrie

Military offices
| Preceded by Peter Inge | General Officer Commanding North East District and Commander 2nd Infantry Division; 1985–1987 | Succeeded by Murray Naylor |
| Preceded by John MacMillan | Assistant Chief of the General Staff; 1987–1989 | Succeeded by Richard Swinburn |
| Preceded by Sir Peter Inge | GOC 1st (British) Corps; 1989–1991 | Succeeded by Sir Jeremy Mackenzie |
| Preceded by Sir Peter Inge | Commander-in-Chief of the British Army of the Rhine; 1992–1994 | Command disbanded |
| Preceded by Sir Peter Inge | Chief of the General Staff; 1994–1997 | Succeeded by Sir Roger Wheeler |
| Preceded by Sir Peter Inge | Chief of the Defence Staff; 1997–2001 | Succeeded by Sir Michael Boyce |
