= William Rous (British Army officer) =

British Army general (1939–1999)

Lieutenant-General Sir William Rous KCB OBE
- Born: 23 February 1939; North Walsham, Norfolk, England
- Died: 25 May 1999 (aged 60); Chichester, West Sussex, England
- Military career
- Allegiance: United Kingdom
- Branch: British Army
- Service years: 1959–1996
- Rank: Lieutenant-General
- Commands: 4th Armoured Division; Staff College, Camberley
- Awards: Knight Commander of the Order of the Bath; Officer of the Order of the British Empire

Lieutenant-General Sir William Edward Rous, KCB, OBE (23 February 1939 – 25 May 1999) was a British Army officer who served as Quartermaster-General to the Forces.

== Early life and education ==
Rous was the second son of Hon. Keith Rous and Pamela Catherine Mabell Kay-Shuttleworth, only daughter of Captain Hon. Edward James Kay-Shuttleworth (1890–1917). His mother was the granddaughter of Ughtred Kay-Shuttleworth, 1st Baron Shuttleworth and sister of the 4th Baron. He had an elder brother, Keith Rous, later the 6th Earl of Stradbroke. His parents divorced in 1940. His father remarried, in 1943, to April Mary Asquith, daughter of Brigadier General Hon. Arthur Asquith, and had one more son and four daughters. He was educated at Harrow School and Royal Military Academy Sandhurst.

In 1983, his father succeeded his elder brother, John Rous, 4th Earl of Stradbroke, as the 5th Earl of Stradbroke but lived only four days as earl before his own death.

== Military career ==
Rous was commissioned into the Coldstream Guards in 1959. He was appointed General Officer Commanding 4th Armoured Division in 1987, and then selected to be commandant of the Staff College, Camberley, in 1989.

In 1991, Rous was appointed Military Secretary, and in 1994 he went on to be Quartermaster-General to the Forces. He retired in 1996.

Rous was also Colonel of the Coldstream Guards.

== Personal life ==
In 1970, Rous married Rosemary Persse, only child of Major Jocelyn Arthur Persse, and Joan Shirley (later Lady Carew Pole). They had two sons: James Anthony Edward (born 1972) and Richard William Jocelyn (born 1975).

In 1998, Rous was appointed as Chairman of the British Greyhound Racing Board but resigned in 1999 following ill health. He was also Chairman of Kingston Hospital. He died of cancer in May 1999 and the cancer unit at the hospital is named after him.

Military offices
Preceded by Michael Hobbs	General Officer Commanding 4th Armoured Division; 1987–1989	Succeeded by Jeremy Mackenzie
Preceded by Jeremy Mackenzie	Commandant of the Staff College, Camberley; 1989–1991	Succeeded by Michael Rose
Preceded by Sir John Learmont	Military Secretary; 1991–1994	Succeeded by Sir Robert Hayman-Joyce
Preceded by Sir John Learmont	Quartermaster-General to the Forces; 1994–1996	Succeeded by Sir Samuel Cowan
Honorary titles
Preceded by Sir George Burns	Colonel of the Coldstream Guards; 1994–1999	Succeeded by Sir Michael Rose
