= Henry Woods (British Army officer) =

British Army officer (1924–2019)

Major-General Henry Woods CB MVO MBE MC DL
- Born: 7 May 1924
- Died: 19 September 2019 (aged 95)
- Military career
- Allegiance: United Kingdom
- Branch: British Army
- Rank: Major-General
- Commands: North East District; Royal Armoured Corps Centre; 5th Royal Inniskilling Dragoon Guards
- Conflicts: Second World War; Korean War
- Awards: Companion of the Order of the Bath; Member of the Royal Victorian Order; Member of the Order of the British Empire; Military Cross

Major-General Henry Gabriel Woods, CB, MVO, MBE, MC, DL (7 May 1924 – 19 September 2019) was a British Army officer.

== Early life and education ==
Woods was educated at Highgate School and Trinity College, Oxford.

== Military career ==
Woods was commissioned into the 5th Royal Inniskilling Dragoon Guards in 1944 and served in North West Europe during the Second World War. He also saw action during the Korean War. He became commanding officer of the 5th Royal Inniskilling Dragoon Guards in 1965. He went on to be Commandant, Royal Armoured Corps Centre in 1969, British Military Attaché in Washington, D.C. in 1973 and General Officer Commanding North East District in 1976. Woods was appointed a Companion of the Order of the Bath (CB) in the 1979 Birthday Honours.

== Personal life ==
Woods married Imogen Elizabeth Birchenough Dodd in 1953; they had two daughters.

He died on 19 September 2019 at the age of 95.

Military offices
Preceded by Geoffrey Collin	General Officer Commanding North East District; 1976–1980	Succeeded by Ian Baker
