= Supreme Allied Commander Europe =

Commander of the North Atlantic Treaty Organization

- SHAPE coat of arms

- Standard

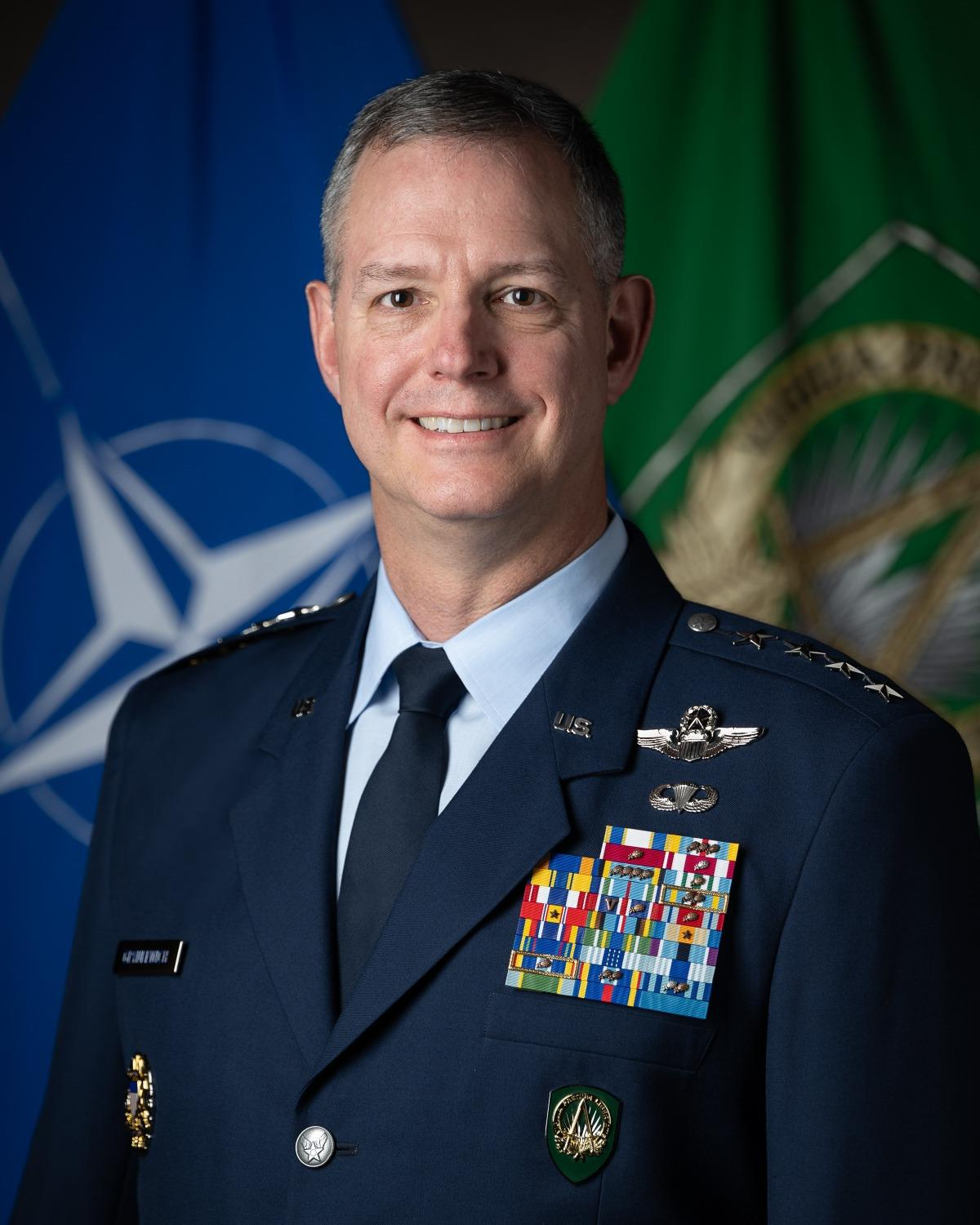
- Incumbent; General Alexus G. Grynkewich since 4 July 2025
- North Atlantic Treaty Organization; Allied Command Operations (Supreme Headquarters Allied Powers Europe)
- Abbreviation: SACEUR
- Reports to: North Atlantic Council, through NATO Military Committee
- Residence: Chateau Gendebien
- Seat: Casteau, Mons, Belgium
- Nominator: President of the United States, with Senate advice and consent
- Appointer: North Atlantic Council
- Formation: 2 April 1951; 75 years ago
- First holder: General of the Army; Dwight D. Eisenhower
- Website: shape.nato.int

The Supreme Allied Commander Europe (SACEUR) is the commander of the North Atlantic Treaty Organization's (NATO) Allied Command Operations (ACO) and head of ACO's headquarters, Supreme Headquarters Allied Powers Europe (SHAPE). The commander is based at SHAPE in Casteau, Belgium. In effect, SACEUR is the second-highest military position within NATO, below only the Chair of the NATO Military Committee in terms of precedence. There is another Supreme Allied Commander in NATO, Supreme Allied Commander Transformation (SACT), titularly equal, but whose duties are less operational. SACT, in Norfolk, Virginia, has responsibility for capability development rather than operations.

SACEUR, by tradition, has always been held by a U.S. military officer, and the position is dual-hatted with that of Commander of United States European Command.

The current SACEUR is General Alexus G. Grynkewich of the US Air Force.

== List of holders ==
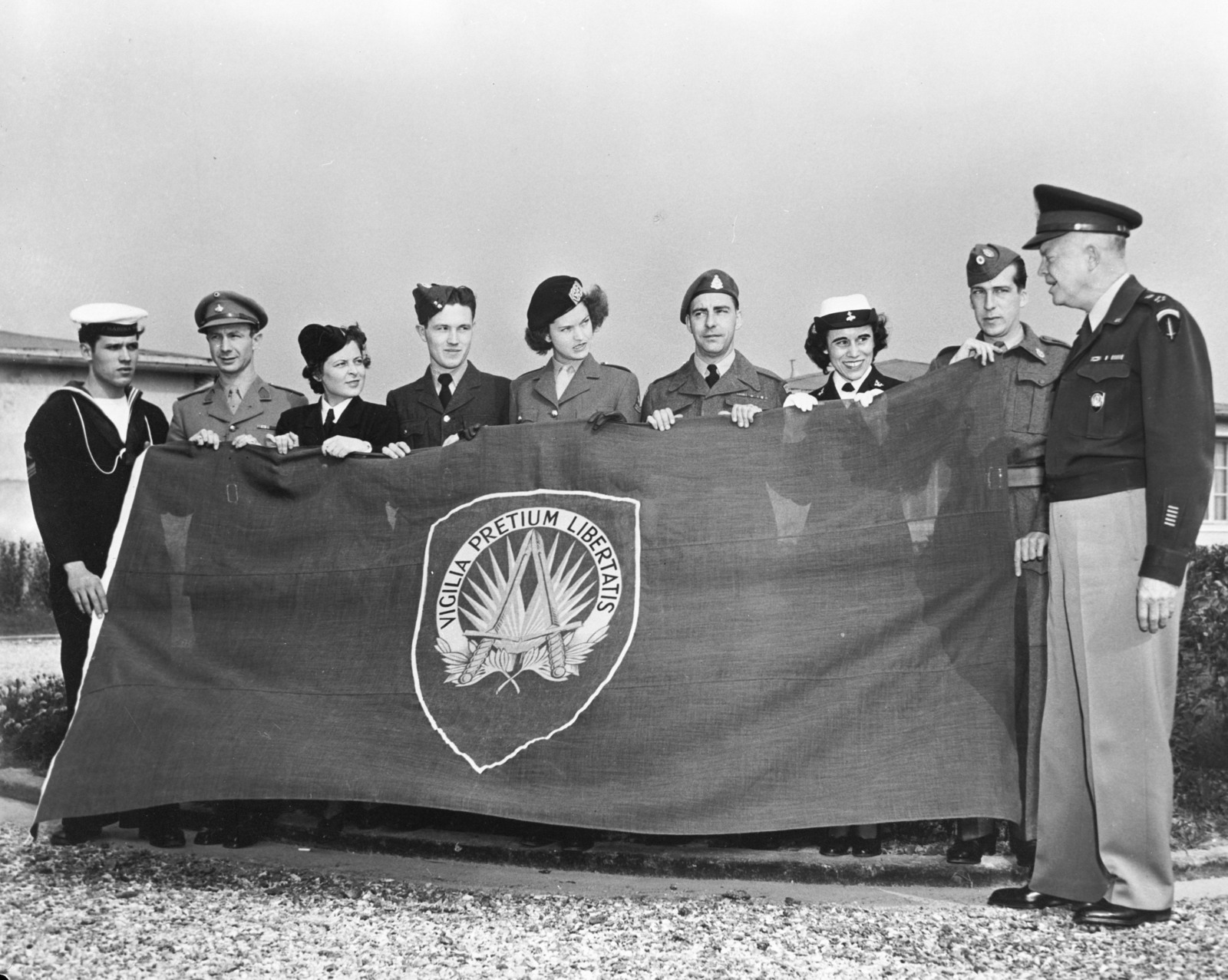
Gen. Dwight Eisenhower in front of the flag of SHAPE on 8 October 1951

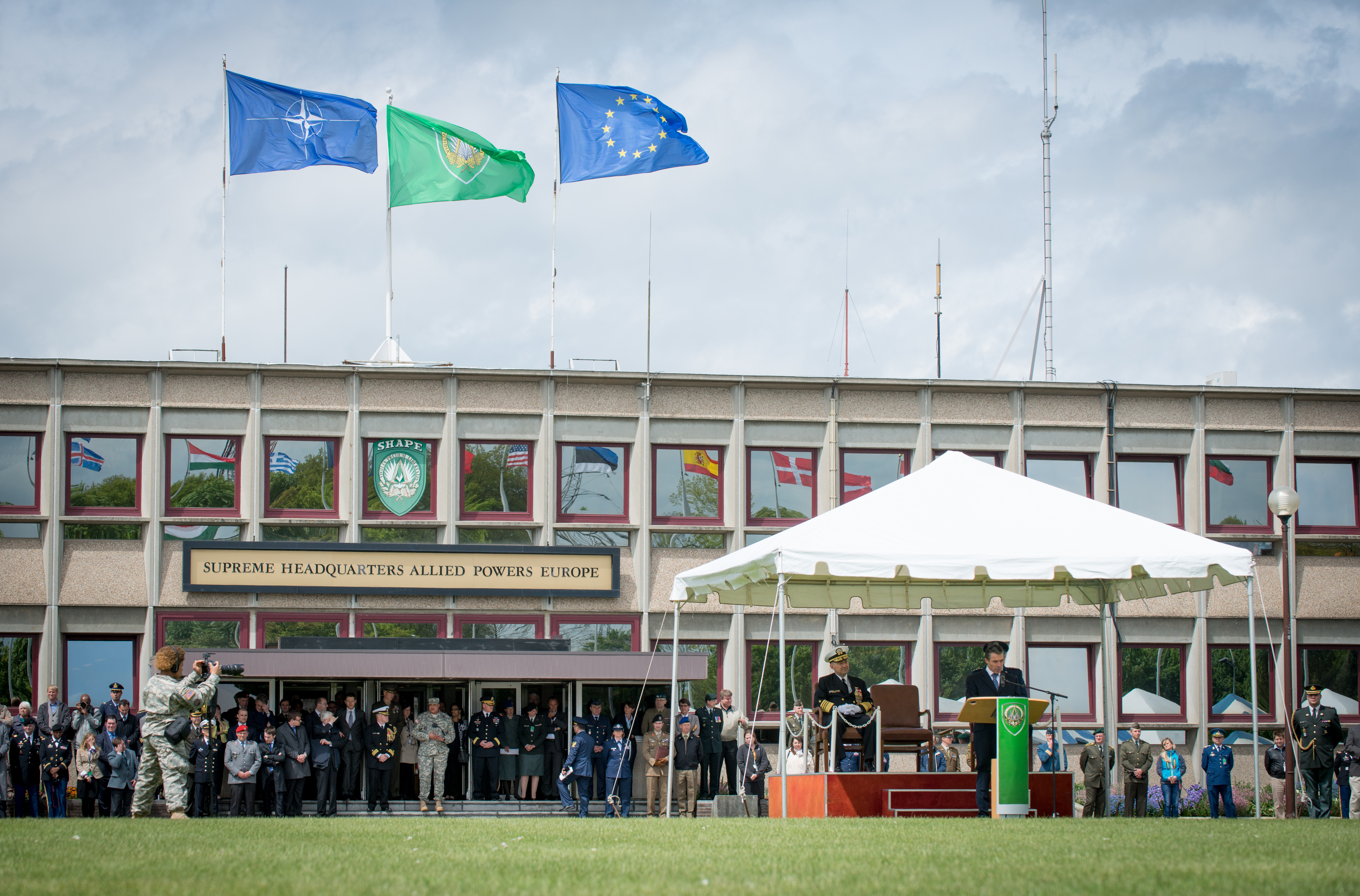
2013 SACEUR change of command at SHAPE

Since 2003 the Supreme Allied Commander Europe (SACEUR) has also served as the head of Allied Command Europe and the head of Allied Command Operations. The officeholders have been:

No.	Portrait	Supreme Allied Commander	Took office	Left office	Time in office	Defence branch
1	Dwight D. Eisenhower	General of the Army; Dwight D. Eisenhower (1890–1969)	2 April 1951	30 May 1952	1 year, 58 days	United States Army
2	Matthew Ridgway	General; Matthew Ridgway (1895–1993)	30 May 1952	11 July 1953	1 year, 42 days	United States Army
3	Alfred M. Gruenther	General; Alfred M. Gruenther (1899–1983)	11 July 1953	20 November 1956	3 years, 132 days	United States Army
4	Lauris Norstad	General; Lauris Norstad (1907–1988)	20 November 1956	1 January 1963	6 years, 42 days	United States Air Force
5	Lyman L. Lemnitzer	General; Lyman L. Lemnitzer (1899–1988)	1 January 1963	1 July 1969	6 years, 181 days	United States Army
6	Andrew Goodpaster	General; Andrew Goodpaster (1915–2005)	1 July 1969	15 December 1974	5 years, 167 days	United States Army
7	Alexander M. Haig Jr.	General; Alexander M. Haig Jr. (1924–2010)	15 December 1974	1 July 1979	4 years, 198 days	United States Army
8	Bernard W. Rogers	General; Bernard W. Rogers (1921–2008)	1 July 1979	26 June 1987	7 years, 360 days	United States Army
9	John Galvin	General; John Galvin (1929–2015)	26 June 1987	23 June 1992	4 years, 363 days	United States Army
10	John Shalikashvili	General; John Shalikashvili (1936–2011)	23 June 1992	22 October 1993	1 year, 121 days	United States Army
11	George A. Joulwan	General; George A. Joulwan (born 1939)	22 October 1993	11 July 1997	3 years, 262 days	United States Army
12	Wesley Clark	General; Wesley Clark (born 1944)	11 July 1997	3 May 2000	2 years, 297 days	United States Army
13	Joseph Ralston	General; Joseph Ralston (born 1943)	3 May 2000	17 January 2003	2 years, 259 days	United States Air Force
14	James L. Jones	General; James L. Jones (born 1943)	17 January 2003	7 December 2006	3 years, 324 days	United States Marine Corps
15	Bantz J. Craddock	General; Bantz J. Craddock (born 1949)	7 December 2006	2 July 2009	2 years, 207 days	United States Army
16	James G. Stavridis	Admiral; James G. Stavridis (born 1955)	2 July 2009	13 May 2013	3 years, 315 days	United States Navy
17	Philip M. Breedlove	General; Philip M. Breedlove (born 1955)	13 May 2013	4 May 2016	2 years, 357 days	United States Air Force
18	Curtis M. Scaparrotti	General; Curtis M. Scaparrotti (born 1956)	4 May 2016	3 May 2019	2 years, 364 days	United States Army
19	Tod D. Wolters	General; Tod D. Wolters (born 1960)	3 May 2019	4 July 2022	3 years, 62 days	United States Air Force
20	Christopher G. Cavoli	General; Christopher G. Cavoli (born c. 1965)	4 July 2022	4 July 2025	3 years, 0 days	United States Army
21	Alexus G. Grynkewich	General; Alexus G. Grynkewich (born 1971)	4 July 2025	Incumbent	1 year, 140 days	United States Air Force

== Deputy Supreme Allied Command Europe ==
The position of Deputy Supreme Allied Command Europe (DSACEUR) has been known as Deputy Head of Allied Command Operations since 2003. From January 1978 until June 1993 there were two DSACEURs, one British and one German. From July 1993 this reverted to a single DSACEUR. The DSACEUR position has, by tradition, always been held by British or German military officers. The officeholders have been as follows:

Single DSACEUR (April 1951 – January 1978)

No.	Portrait	Deputy Supreme Allied Commander	Start of term	End of term	Branch	Unit of Commission
1.		Field Marshal The Viscount Montgomery of Alamein, KG GCB DSO PC DL	2 April 1951	23 September 1958	British Army	Royal Warwickshire Regiment
2.		General Sir Richard Gale, GCB KBE DSO MC	23 September 1958	22 September 1960	British Army	Worcestershire Regiment
3.		General Sir Hugh Stockwell, GCB KBE DSO*	22 September 1960	1 January 1964	British Army	Royal Welch Fusiliers
4.		Marshal of the Royal Air Force Sir Thomas Pike, GCB CBE DFC* DL	1 January 1964	1 March 1967	Royal Air Force	N/A
5.		General Sir Robert Bray, GCB KBE DSO*	1 March 1967	1 December 1970	British Army	Duke of Wellington's (West Riding) Regiment
6.		General Sir Desmond Fitzpatrick, GCB GCVO DSO MBE MC	1 December 1970	12 November 1973	British Army	1st The Royal Dragoons
7.		General Sir John Mogg, GCB CBE DSO*	12 November 1973	12 March 1976	British Army	Oxfordshire and Buckinghamshire Light Infantry
8.		General Sir Harry Tuzo, GCB OBE MC DL	12 March 1976	3 January 1978 (As solo DSACEUR)	British Army	Royal Artillery

Two DSACEURs (January 1978 until June 1993)

British								German					
No.	Portrait	Deputy Supreme Allied Commander	Term	Branch	Unit of Commission	Start of term	End of term	No.	Portrait	Deputy Supreme Allied Commander	Term	Branch	
8.		General Sir Harry Tuzo, GCB OBE MC DL	3 January 1978: 2 November 1978 (As Co-DSACEUR)	British Army	Royal Artillery	3 January 1978	2 November 1978	9.		General Gerd Schmückle	3 January 1978: 1 April 1980	German Army	-
10.		General Sir Jack Harman, GCB OBE MC	2 November 1978: 9 April 1981	British Army	2nd Dragoon Guards (Queen's Bays)	2 November 1978	1 April 1980	9.		General Gerd Schmückle	3 January 1978: 1 April 1980	German Army	-
10.		General Sir Jack Harman, GCB OBE MC	2 November 1978: 9 April 1981	British Army	2nd Dragoon Guards (Queen's Bays)	1 April 1980	9 April 1981	11.		Admiral Günter Luther	1 April 1980: 1 April 1982	German Navy	Naval aviation
12.		Air Chief Marshal Sir Peter Terry, GCB AFC	9 April 1981: 16 July 1984	Royal Air Force	Royal Air Force Regiment (anti-aircraft artillery)	9 April 1981	1 April 1982	11.		Admiral Günter Luther	1 April 1980: 1 April 1982	German Navy	Naval aviation
12.		Air Chief Marshal Sir Peter Terry, GCB AFC	9 April 1981: 16 July 1984	Royal Air Force	Royal Air Force Regiment (anti-aircraft artillery)	1 April 1982	2 April 1984	13.		General Günter Kießling	1 April 1982	German Army	
12.		Air Chief Marshal Sir Peter Terry, GCB AFC	9 April 1981: 16 July 1984	Royal Air Force	Royal Air Force Regiment (anti-aircraft artillery)	2 April 1984	16 July 1984	14.		General Hans-Joachim Mack	2 April 1984: 1 October 1987	German Army	
15.		General Sir Edward Burgess, KCB OBE	16 July 1984	British Army	Royal Artillery	16 July 1984	26 June 1987	14.		General Hans-Joachim Mack	2 April 1984: 1 October 1987	German Army	
16.		General Sir John Akehurst, KCB CBE	26 June 1987: 17 January 1990	British Army	Northamptonshire Regiment	26 June 1987	1 October 1987	14.		General Hans-Joachim Mack	2 April 1984: 1 October 1987	German Army	
16.		General Sir John Akehurst, KCB CBE	26 June 1987: 17 January 1990	British Army	Northamptonshire Regiment	1 October 1987	17 January 1990	17.		General Eberhard Eimler	1 October 1987: 2 October 1990	German Air Force	N/A
18.		General Sir Brian Kenny, GCB CBE	17 January 1990: 5 April 1993	British Army	4th Queen's Own Hussars	17 January 1990	2 October 1990	17.		General Eberhard Eimler	1 October 1987: 2 October 1990	German Air Force	N/A
18.		General Sir Brian Kenny, GCB CBE	17 January 1990: 5 April 1993	British Army	4th Queen's Own Hussars	2 October 1990	5 April 1993	19.		General Dieter Clauss	2 October 1990: 1 July 1993	German Army	-
20.		General Sir John Waters, GCB CBE	5 April 1993: 1 July 1993 (As Co-DSACEUR)	British Army	Gloucestershire Regiment	5 April 1993	1 July 1993	19.		General Dieter Clauss	2 October 1990: 1 July 1993	German Army	-

Single DSACEUR (July 1993 – present)

No.	Portrait	Deputy Supreme Allied Commander	Start of term	End of term	Branch	Unit of Commission
20.		General Sir John Waters, GCB CBE	1 July 1993 (As solo DSACEUR)	12 December 1994	British Army	Gloucestershire Regiment
21.		General Sir Jeremy Mackenzie, GCB OBE DL	12 December 1994	30 November 1998	British Army	Queen's Own Highlanders
22.		General Sir Rupert Smith, KCB DSO* OBE QGM	30 November 1998	17 September 2001	British Army	Parachute Regiment
23.		General Dieter Stöckmann	17 September 2001	18 September 2002	German Army	Panzergrenadier
24.		Admiral Rainer Feist	18 September 2002	1 October 2004	German Navy	N/A
25.		General Sir John Reith, KCB CBE	1 October 2004	22 October 2007	British Army	Parachute Regiment
26.		General Sir John McColl, KCB CBE DSO KStJ	22 October 2007	March 2011	British Army	Royal Anglian Regiment
27.		General Sir Richard Shirreff, KCB CBE	March 2011	March 2014	British Army	14th/20th King's Hussars
28.		General Sir Adrian Bradshaw, KCB OBE	March 2014	March 2017	British Army	14th/20th King's Hussars
29.		General Sir James Everard, KCB CBE	March 2017	April 2020	British Army	17th/21st Lancers
30.		General Sir Tim Radford, KCB DSO OBE	April 2020	July 2023	British Army	The Light Infantry
31.		Admiral Sir Keith E. Blount, KCB OBE FRAeS	July 2023	March 2026	Royal Navy	Fleet Air Arm
32.		Air Chief Marshal Sir John J. Stringer, KCB CBE	March 2026	Incumbent	Royal Air Force	N/A

== Role in intra-European defence integration ==
=== DSACEUR's role in European Union missions ===
Under the 2002 Berlin Plus agreement, SHAPE may take part in the European Union's (EU) command and control structure as an operational headquarters (OHQ) for EU missions. In such an instance, the Deputy Supreme Allied Commander Europe (DSACEUR), who is always a European, would serve as Operation Commander (OpCdr). Since Brexit, and DSACEUR being British, this role has gone to SHAPE Vice Chief of Staff. This use of SHAPE by the EU is subject to a "right of first refusal", i.e. NATO must first decline to intervene in a given crisis, and is contingent upon unanimous approval among NATO states, including those outside of the EU.

== See also ==
- Supreme Allied Commander – most senior commander within certain multinational military alliances
- Supreme Commander for the Allied Powers – post-WW2 counterpart during the Allied Occupation of Japan
- Secretary General of NATO
- Chairman of the NATO Military Committee
- Supreme Commander of the Unified Armed Forces of the Warsaw Treaty Organization – Warsaw Pact counterpart
