= North East District (British Army) =

- Active: 1967–1992
- Country: United Kingdom
- Branch: British Army
- Type: District Command
- Garrison/HQ: Imphal Barracks

North East District was a district command of the British Army from 1967 and 1992.

== History ==
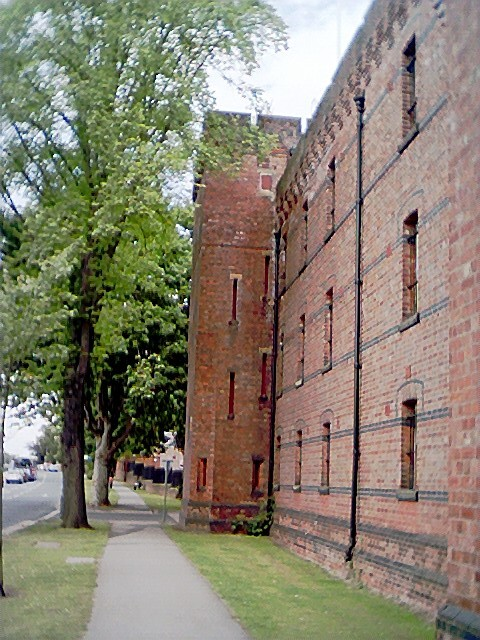
Imphal Barracks, command headquarters

The district was formed from 50th (Northumbrian) Infantry Division as part of the Territorial Army Volunteer Reserve in 1967. It had its headquarters at Imphal Barracks, and was placed under the command of HQ UK Land Forces in 1972. The district merged with Eastern District to form an enlarged Eastern District at Imphal Barracks in 1992.

== Commanders ==
General officers commanding included:

- 1967–1968 Major-General Rex Whitworth
- 1968–1970 Major-General John Ward-Harrison
- 1970–1973 Major-General Geoffrey Armitage
- 1973 Major-General John Ward-Harrison
- 1973–1976 Major-General Geoffrey Collin
- 1976–1980 Major-General Henry Woods
- 1980–1982 Major-General Ian Baker
- 1982–1984 Major-General Patrick Palmer
- 1984–1986 Major-General Peter Inge
- 1986–1987 Major-General Charles Guthrie
- 1987–1989 Major-General Murray Naylor
- 1989–1991 Major-General Michael Rose
- 1991–1992 Major-General Michael Walker
