= Brian Kenny (British Army officer) =

British Army officer (1934–2017)

General Sir Brian Kenny GCB CBE
- Born: 18 June 1934; Aldershot, Hampshire, United Kingdom
- Died: 19 June 2017 (aged 83); Putney, London, United Kingdom
- Education: Royal Military Academy Sandhurst
- Military career
- Allegiance: United Kingdom
- Branch: British Army
- Service years: 1954–1993
- Rank: General
- Service number: 437098
- Commands: British Army of the Rhine (1987–1989); 1st Corps (1985–1987); 1st Armoured Division (1982–1983)
- Conflicts: United Nations Peacekeeping Force in Cyprus
- Awards: Knight Grand Cross of the Order of the Bath; Commander of the Order of the British Empire

General Sir Brian Leslie Graham Kenny, GCB, CBE (18 June 1934 – 19 June 2017) was a senior British Army officer who served as Deputy Supreme Allied Commander Europe from 1990 until his retirement in 1993.

== Early life ==
Brian Leslie Graham Kenny was born on 18 June 1934 at Louise Margaret Hospital in Aldershot, Hampshire. He was born to Royal Artillery officer, Brigadier James Wolfenden Kenny (1899–1978), and Aileen Anne Georgina Kenny (née Swan) (1903–1995). Kenny was educated at Canford School, a public school in Wimborne, Dorset, from 1948 to 1952.

== Military career ==
Kenny attended the Royal Military Academy Sandhurst from 1952 to 1954, graduating with the sword of honour. Kenny was commissioned into the 4th Queen's Own Hussars in 1954. He rose to be General Officer Commanding (GOC) 1st Armoured Division in 1982. He took up an appointment as Director of Army Staff Duties at the Ministry of Defence in 1984 before becoming GOC 1st Corps in 1985 and then GOC of British Army of the Rhine in 1987. He was appointed Deputy Supreme Allied Commander Europe in 1990 and retired in 1993. He was also Colonel Commandant of the Royal Armoured Corps.

== Retirement and death ==
Kenny was Governor of the Royal Hospital Chelsea from 1993 to 1999. He was King of Arms of the Order of the Bath from 1999 to 2009.

Kenny died of complications associated with Alzheimer's disease at Lyle House care home in Putney, London, on 19 June 2017, at the age of 83. He was buried in Tarrant Gunville, Dorset. He was survived by his wife, Diana, and their son, as well as four grandchildren.

== Personal life ==
Kenny married Diana Catherine Jane Mathew at the parish church of Crewkerne, Somerset, on 9 August 1958. They had two sons, Timothy and Stephen. Kenny was fluent in French and German.

Military offices
Preceded by Geoffrey Howlett	General Officer Commanding 1st Armoured Division; 1982–1983	Succeeded by David Thorne
Preceded by Sir Martin Farndale	General Officer Commanding 1st Corps; 1985–1987	Succeeded by Sir Peter Inge
Preceded by Sir Martin Farndale	Commander-in-Chief of the British Army of the Rhine; 1987–1989	Succeeded by Sir Peter Inge
Preceded by Sir John Akehurst	Deputy Supreme Allied Commander Europe; With Dieter Clauss; 1990–1993	Succeeded by Sir John Waters
Honorary titles
Preceded by Sir Roland Guy	Governor, Royal Hospital Chelsea; 1993–1999	Succeeded by Sir Jeremy Mackenzie
Heraldic offices
Preceded by Sir David Evans	King of Arms of the Order of the Bath; 1999–2009	Succeeded by Lord Boyce
