= Michael Rose (British Army officer) =

British Army general (born 1940)

General Sir Michael Rose KCB CBE DSO QGM DL
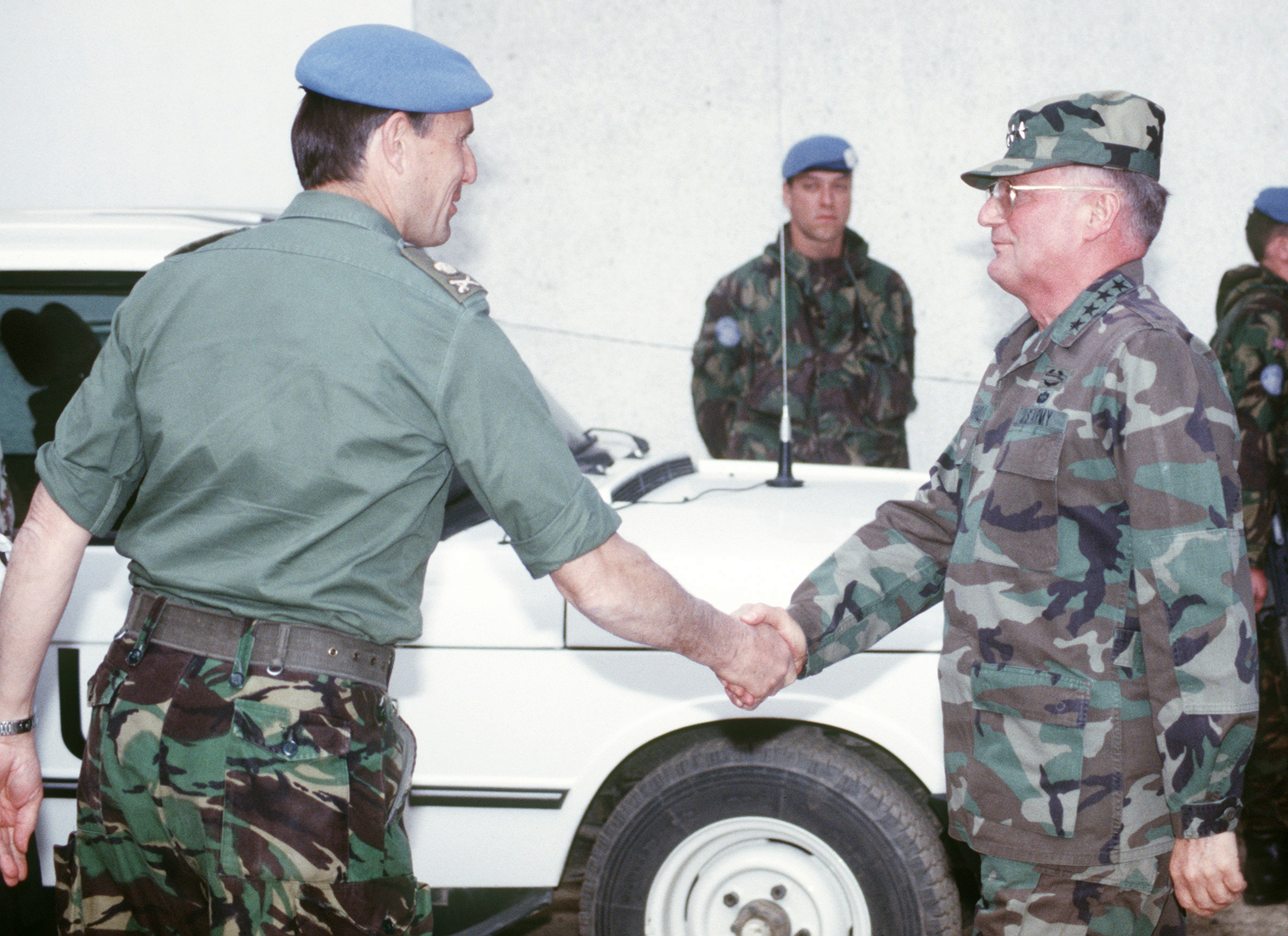
- Lieutenant General Sir Mike Rose (left) with General John Shalikashvili in 1994
- Born: 5 January 1940 (age 86); British India
- Military career
- Allegiance: United Kingdom
- Branch: British Army
- Service years: 1959–1997
- Rank: General
- Service number: 460818
- Commands: United Nations Protection Force (1994–1995); UK Field Army (1993–1994); Staff College, Camberley (1991–1993); 2nd Infantry Division (1989–1991); Director Special Forces (1988–1989); Special Air Service (1979–1982)
- Conflicts: The Troubles; Falklands War; Bosnian War
- Awards: Knight Commander of the Order of the Bath; Commander of the Order of the British Empire; Companion of the Distinguished Service Order; Queen's Gallantry Medal; Mentioned in Despatches (2)

General Sir Hugh Michael Rose, KCB, CBE, DSO, QGM, DL (born 5 January 1940), often known as Sir Mike Rose, is a retired British Army general. As well as Special Air Service Regiment commanding officer, he was Commander United Nations Protection Force in Bosnia in 1994 during the Yugoslav Wars.

== Early life ==
The stepson of British author John Masters, Rose was educated at Cheltenham College, St. Edmund Hall, Oxford, and the Sorbonne.

Rose enlisted in the Territorial and Army Volunteer Reserve (TAVR) as a private soldier and was commissioned into the Gloucestershire Regiment TAVR on 17 March 1959, transferring to the Rifle Brigade as a second lieutenant on 1 June. Rose was confirmed in this rank and promoted to lieutenant on 18 December 1960. and attached to the Inns of Court (TAVR).

Rose transferred to the Royal Air Force Volunteer Reserve (RAFVR) (General Duties Branch) as acting pilot officer, with the service number 207004, on a three-year commission on 2 November 1961, but relinquished the commission on 11 October 1963.

== Military career ==
On graduation from university, having gained a Bachelor of Arts degree, Rose joined the Regular Army Coldstream Guards as a second lieutenant on 22 October 1964. and was promoted lieutenant on the same day. Rose was promoted major on 31 December 1972, and after attending the Staff College, Camberley, became the Brigade Major of the 16th Parachute Brigade from 1973 until 1975, serving in Northern Ireland attached to the Devon and Dorset Regiment and being awarded a Mention in Despatches. He was promoted lieutenant colonel on 30 June 1978, and was commanding officer of 22 SAS from 1979 to 1982, as part of which he was in control of the operation to free the hostages of the Iranian Embassy Siege in 1980; he was portrayed by Robert Portal in the 2017 film about the siege, 6 Days. Rose was appointed an Officer of the Order of the British Empire on 7 January 1980. Serving in Northern Ireland in 1981, Rose was awarded the Queen's Gallantry Medal, which was not gazetted until 1994.

Rose commanded SAS operations in-theatre during the Falklands War, following which he was promoted to colonel on 30 June 1982, and Mentioned in Despatches. He conducted negotiations with the Argentine forces to arrange their surrender deploying some of the skills that he had learnt from the Iranian Embassy siege.

After being promoted brigadier on 31 December 1983, Rose served as the commander of the 39th Infantry Brigade from 1983 to 1985. He was appointed a Commander of the Order of the British Empire in April 1986. From 1987 until 1988, Rose was Commandant of the School of Infantry, and from 1988 until 1989, the first Director Special Forces. He attended the Royal College of Defence Studies.

Rose was General Officer Commanding North East District and Commander 2nd Infantry Division based in York from 30 October 1989 to 30 September 1991, During this period he was promoted major general. Between 1991 and 8 April 1993 he served as Commandant of the Staff College, Camberley, following which he was promoted lieutenant general on 17 May 1993, and knighted as a Knight Commander of the Order of the Bath. From 26 April 1993 to 1994, Rose served as Commander UK Field Army and Inspector-General of the Territorial Army.

Rose was Commander, United Nations Protection Force in Bosnia-Herzegovina from 24 January 1994 to 23 January 1995. His service in this period was recognised on 5 May 1995 when he was appointed a Companion of the Distinguished Service Order. On 14 March 1995 Rose resumed his appointment as Commander UK Field Army, and on 10 May 1995 became Honorary Colonel of the Oxford University Officer Training Corps. Rose became Adjutant-General on 7 July 1995, and Aide-de-Camp General to The Queen on 9 September 1995, in which role he served until 31 August 1997.

Rose was appointed Colonel of the Regiment of the Coldstream Guards on 23 August 1999. On 10 March 2000 his tenure as Honorary Colonel of the Oxford University Officer Training Corps came to a conclusion, and he was succeeded by General Sir Roger Wheeler.

Rose was called as a witness by Serbia and Montenegro in a case held at the International Court of Justice.

== Other occupations ==
Rose was appointed Deputy Lieutenant for the County of Somerset on 5 August 2003.

Rose has been a board member of Skarbek Associates since 2012 where he is also involved in the development and delivery of the leadership and teamwork components of Skarbek's capability building programme.

== Opposition to Iraq war ==
In 2006 Rose came once again to public attention when he criticised the UK Prime Minister Tony Blair, and called for his impeachment for leading the country to war in Iraq under false pretences. This highlighted Rose's unease about the legality and practicality of the 2003 American-led invasion of Iraq.

In 2007, he called for the admission of defeat and withdrawal of Coalition forces from Iraq, describing the war as "hopeless" and comparing the situation to that faced by the British during the American War of Independence.

Military offices
Preceded by Michael Wilkes	Director Special Forces; 1988–1989	Succeeded by Jeremy Phipps
Preceded by Murray Naylor	General Officer Commanding North East District and Commander 2nd Infantry Division; 1989–1991	Succeeded by Michael Walker
Preceded by William Rous	Commanant of the Staff College, Camberley; 1991–1993	Succeeded by Christopher Wallace
Preceded by Sir Michael Wilkes	Commander UK Field Army; 1993–1994	Succeeded by Sir Richard Swinburn
Preceded by Sir Michael Wilkes	Adjutant General; 1995–1997	Succeeded by Sir Alexander Harley
Honorary titles
Preceded by Sir William Rous	Colonel of the Coldstream Guards; 1999–2009	Succeeded by Sir James Bucknall
