= Rex Whitworth =

British Army general

Major-General Rex Whitworth CB CBE
- Born: 27 August 1916
- Died: 22 May 2004 (aged 87)
- Military career
- Allegiance: United Kingdom
- Branch: British Army
- Rank: Major-General
- Service number: 124539
- Commands: 1st Battalion, Grenadier Guards; Berlin Infantry Brigade; North East District
- Conflicts: Second World War
- Awards: Companion of the Order of the Bath; Commander of the Order of the British Empire

Major-General Reginald Henry "Rex" Whitworth, CB, CBE (27 August 1916 – 22 May 2004) was a British Army officer.

== Military career ==
Educated at Eton College, Balliol College, Oxford, and the Queen's College, Oxford, Whitworth was commissioned into the Grenadier Guards on 5 March 1940. He served as a staff officer during the Second World War.

After the war he became commanding officer of the 1st Battalion, Grenadier Guards, in 1956, commander of the Berlin Infantry Brigade in October 1961 and deputy military secretary at the Ministry of Defence in February 1964. He went on to be General Officer Commanding, Yorkshire District in March 1966, General Officer Commanding North East District in March 1967 and Chief of Staff of Southern Command in June 1968 before retiring in September 1970.

He was appointed a Commander of the Order of the British Empire in the 1964 New Year Honours and a Companion of the Order of the Bath in the 1969 Birthday Honours.

In retirement he was a fellow and bursar of Exeter College, Oxford, from 1970 to 1981.

== Family ==
In 1946 he married June Rachel Edwards; they had three sons and one daughter.

== Works ==
- Whitworth, Rex (1958). Field Marshal Lord Ligonier: a Story of the British Army, 1702-1770. Clarendon Press.
- Whitworth, Rex (1988). Gunner at Large: The Diary of James Wood R.A. 1746-65. Pen and Sword. ISBN 978-0850528848.
- Whitworth, Rex (1993). William Augustus, Duke of Cumberland, a Life: Victor of Culloden. Pen and Sword. ISBN 978-0850523546.

Military offices
Preceded by Derek Horsford	GOC North East District; 1967–1968	Succeeded by John Ward-Harrison
