= Christopher Wallace (British Army officer) =

British Army general (1943–2016)

Lieutenant General Sir Christopher Wallace KBE DL
- Born: 3 January 1943; Farnborough, Hampshire
- Died: 7 January 2016 (aged 73); Basingstoke, Hampshire
- Military career
- Allegiance: United Kingdom
- Branch: British Army
- Service years: 1962–1999
- Rank: Lieutenant General
- Nickname: "The Wal"
- Service number: 472644
- Unit: Royal Green Jackets
- Commands: Chief of Joint Operations; Staff College, Camberley; 3rd Armoured Division; 7th Armoured Brigade; 3rd Battalion, Royal Green Jackets
- Conflicts: Indonesia–Malaysia confrontation The Troubles
- Awards: Knight Commander of the Order of the British Empire; Mentioned in Despatches

Lieutenant General Sir Christopher Brooke Quentin Wallace, KBE, DL (3 January 1943 – 7 January 2016) was a British Army officer and military historian.

== Early life ==
Born the son of Major Robert and Diane Wallace, he was competitive from boyhood. At his preparatory school where he was head boy as well as captain of cricket and football, the headmaster noted "This boy needs to learn to lead rather than drive." He was further educated at Shrewsbury School. As a boy he had developed a love of singing and this continued into later life. At the age of 18, Wallace entered the Royal Military Academy Sandhurst where he passed out top of the order of merit, receiving the Queen's Medal.

== Military career ==
Wallace was commissioned into the 2nd Battalion Green Jackets (Kings Royal Rifle Corps) in 1962. The regiment saw service in Penang and Borneo during the Indonesia–Malaysia confrontation as part of Far East Land Forces (FARELF) from December 1964 to November 1967 under Lieutenant Colonel Edwin Bramall. Wallace attended the Royal Military College of Science from September to December 1974 and this was followed by a year at the Staff College, Camberley. He had three tours of duty in Northern Ireland during the Troubles for which he was mentioned in despatches. Wallace was appointed a Member of the Order of the British Empire in the 1978 New Year Honours, and advanced to Officer of the Order of the British Empire in the 1983 New Year Honours.

Wallace's regimental service in the Royal Green Jackets concluded with command of the 3rd Battalion in Germany and Northern Ireland from 1983 to 1985. While on exercises at Celle, British Army of the Rhine, he was sharing a tented trailer with his second-in-command when a gas lamp exploded and set the accommodation ablaze. Wallace was badly burned on the hands and face while getting his brother officer to safety. He became commander of 7th Armoured Brigade in 1986, Director of Public Relations (Army) in the Ministry of Defence in 1989 and General Officer Commanding 3rd Armoured Division in 1990. He went on to be Commandant of the Staff College, Camberley, in 1993 and then established the Permanent Joint Headquarters (UK) at Northwood during a tour from 1994 to 1996, before becoming the UK's first Chief of Joint Operations in 1996. He was appointed a Knight Commander of the Order of the British Empire in the 1997 Birthday Honours and retired, aged 56, on 20 June 1999.

Wallace was Colonel commandant of the Royal Military Police from 1 April 1992 until March 1999, Colonel commandant of the Royal Green Jackets from 1995 to 1998 and Colonel commandant of the Light Division from 1998 to 1999.

Wallace has been described as a meticulous wordsmith and a stickler for detail. One of his senior colonels, who had served under him in Germany and at the Permanent Joint Headquarters, described him as "A no-nonsense, to the point, agile-thinking and inspiring leader".

== Subsequent career and interests ==
Wallace was Commandant of the Royal College of Defence Studies, an appointment gained by open competition, from January 2001 until January 2005. In July 1999 he was appointed as a Trustee of the Imperial War Museum and from 2006 to 2008 he held the post of deputy chairman. He was Chairman of the Trustees of The Royal Green Jackets (Rifles) Museum from 1999 until October 2015. The widely acclaimed exhibition With the Rifles to Waterloo will remain as a lasting legacy of his skills as a fund-raiser and project manager. Wallace was also Chairman of the Winchester Military Museums from 2002 to 2016. He was appointed as a Deputy Lieutenant for Hampshire in 2004.

Wallace was also a keen bird-watcher, a hobby which he expanded as his career took him around the world. He had been an accomplished cricketer from his youth and became a single-figure handicap golfer, having a fine record playing in the army golf team on many occasions. He was President of the Army Golf Association from 1995 to 2000. After he retired from the army he was able to develop his interest in military history and become a dedicated and accomplished historian. He had three books published and regularly presented papers on a range of military subjects; these included a talk on one of his ancestors, Lieutenant-General Sir George Augustus Quentin, who had fought in the Napoleonic Wars. He was a member of the British Commission for Military History.

== Family ==
In 1969 Wallace married Delicia Curtis; they had one son and one daughter.

Wallace died in hospital in Basingstoke on 7 January 2016, 4 days after his 73rd birthday, from the rare, debilitating, disease Amyloidosis.

== Bibliography ==
- A Brief History of The King's Royal Rifle Corps 1755–1965, by Christopher Wallace (ISBN 978-0954937003) 2005
- Focus on Courage: the 59 Victoria Crosses of the Royal Green Jackets, by Christopher Wallace & Ron Cassidy (ISBN 978-0954937010) 2006
- Rifles and Kukris: Delhi, 1857, by Christopher Wallace, (ISBN 978-0954937027) 2007

Military offices
| Preceded by Michael Wilkes | GOC 3rd Armoured Division; 1990–1992 | Succeeded by Hew Pike |
| Preceded by Michael Rose | Commandant of the Staff College, Camberley; 1993–1994 | Succeeded by Anthony Pigott |
| New office | Chief of Joint Operations; 1996–1999 | Succeeded by Sir Ian Garnett |
| Preceded by John McAnally | Commandant of the Royal College of Defence Studies; 2001–2005 | Succeeded by Sir Ian Garnett |
