= John Reith (British Army officer) =

British Army general

General Sir John Reith KCB CBE
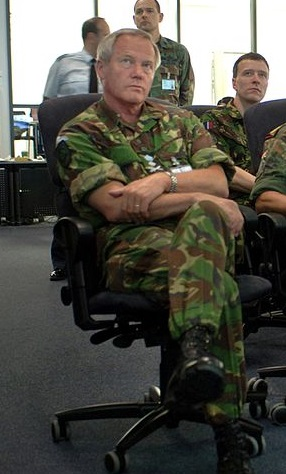
- Sir John Reith receives an operations brief at Allied Air Command, 2007.
- Born: 17 November 1948 (age 77); Northumberland, England
- Military career
- Allegiance: United Kingdom
- Branch: British Army
- Service years: 1969–2008
- Rank: General
- Service number: 488478
- Unit: Parachute Regiment
- Commands: Deputy Supreme Allied Commander Europe; Chief of Joint Operations; Allied Command Europe Mobile Force (Land); 1st Battalion The Parachute Regiment
- Conflicts: Gulf War; Kosovo War; Iraq War
- Awards: Knight Commander of the Order of the Bath; Commander of the Order of the British Empire; Mentioned in Despatches; Queen's Commendation for Valuable Service

General Sir John George Reith, KCB, CBE (born 17 November 1948) is a retired senior British Army officer who was the Deputy Supreme Allied Commander Europe within the North Atlantic Treaty Organization (NATO) from October 2004 to October 2007.

== Military career ==
Reith was commissioned into the Parachute Regiment on 19 December 1969. He was promoted to lieutenant on 19 June 1971 and to captain on 19 December 1975. He was further promoted to major on 30 September 1980, lieutenant colonel on 30 June 1985 and to colonel on 30 June 1989. Early appointments included 3rd Battalion the Parachute Regiment as a company commander, tours of Northern Ireland (for which he was mentioned in despatches on 11 November 1986 and appointed an Officer of the Order of the British Empire on 31 October 1989), a tour of Yugoslavia (for which he was awarded the Queen's Commendation for Valuable Service on 22 November 1994), command of 1st Battalion the Parachute Regiment, and chief of staff of the 20th Armoured Brigade in Detmold, West Germany. He was advanced to Commander of the Order of the British Empire in the 1991 Birthday Honours, and promoted to brigadier on 31 December the same year (with seniority from 30 June).

On 1 July 1997 he assumed the appointment of Commander Allied Command Europe Mobile Force (Land), with the rank of major general; during this tour he commanded AFOR, the NATO-led multinational deployment to Albania to help resolve the Kosovo refugee crisis. He also negotiated the undertaking by the KLA to disarm during the closing stages of the crisis. Appointed a Companion of the Order of the Bath in 2000 New Year Honours, Reith assumed the post of Assistant Chief of Defence Staff (Policy) in the Ministry of Defence central staff in January.

In August 2001 he was appointed Chief of Joint Operations at the Permanent Joint Headquarters, Northwood, and was promoted to lieutenant general on 6 August. During this three-year appointment, he was the joint commander for all worldwide UK overseas operations including Iraq, Afghanistan, the Balkans and Sierra Leone. He was knighted as a Knight Commander of the Order of the Bath on 31 October 2003 for services during the invasion of Iraq. Reith gave evidence to the Iraq Inquiry on 15 January 2010 regarding this role.

Promoted to the acting rank of general in 2003, Reith assumed the appointment of Deputy Supreme Allied Commander Europe and was promoted to the substantive rank of general from 1 October 2004. He retired from this post in October 2007, and retired from the army on 4 March 2008.

== Retirement ==
For a number of years Reith was the chairman of the board of governors of Millfield School in Somerset.

Military offices
Preceded by Admiral Sir Ian Garnett	Chief of Joint Operations; 2001–2004	Succeeded by Air Marshal Sir Glenn Torpy
Preceded by Admiral Rainer Feist	Deputy Supreme Allied Commander Europe; 2004–2007	Succeeded by General Sir John McColl
