= Thomas Edgar Lacy =

British Army general (1804–1880)

Lieutenant-General Thomas Edgar Lacy
- Born: 7 February 1804; London, England
- Died: 22 February 1880; Middlesex, England
- Military career
- Allegiance: United Kingdom
- Branch: British Army
- Rank: Lieutenant-General

Lieutenant-General Thomas Edgar Lacy (7 February 1804 – 22 February 1880) was a British Army officer who became Commandant, Staff College, Sandhurst.

== Military career ==
Lacy was commissioned into the 72nd Highlanders in 1826. He was promoted to lieutenant on 3 October 1826, to captain on 11 July 1834 and to major on 10 November 1846. He became Town Major of Gibraltar on 13 August 1847. He was promoted to lieutenant-colonel on 22 June 1854.

He became Commandant, Staff College, Sandhurst on 1 January 1865. He was promoted to lieutenant-general on his retirement in October 1877.
