= Staff College, Camberley =

Staff college for the British Army

Coordinates: 51.3408°N 0.7485°W

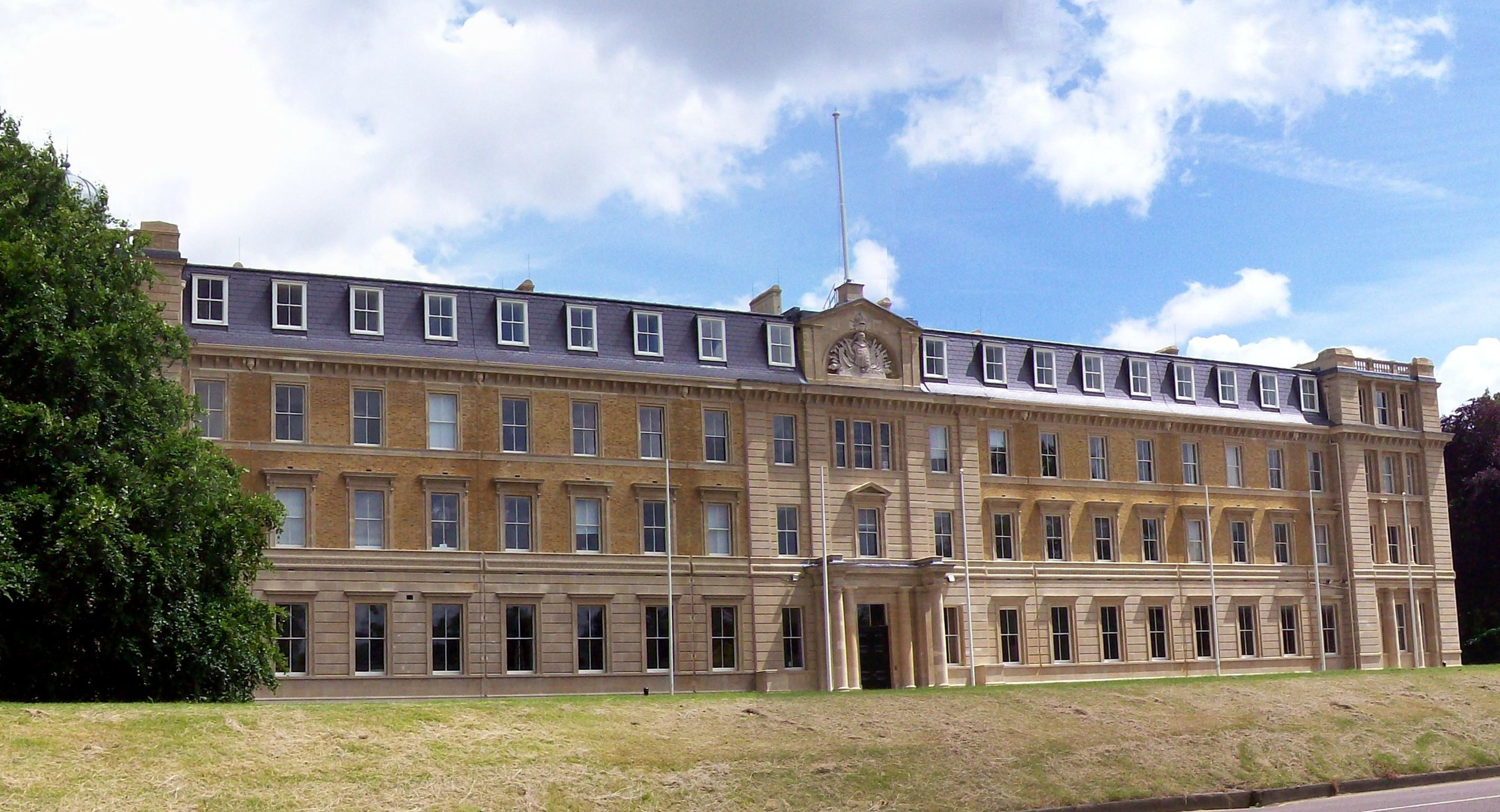
- Staff College, Camberley
- Active: 1802–1997
- Country: United Kingdom
- Branch: British Army
- Type: Training
- Role: Staff Officer Training
- Garrison/HQ: Camberley, Surrey

The Staff College, Camberley, located in Surrey, was a staff college for the British Army and the presidency armies of British India (later merged to form the Indian Army). It had its origins in the Royal Military College, High Wycombe, founded in 1799, which in 1802 became the Senior Department of the new Royal Military College. In 1858 the name of the Senior Department was changed to "Staff College", and in 1870 this was separated from the Royal Military College. Apart from periods of closure during major wars, the Staff College continued to operate until 1997, when it was merged into the new Joint Services Command and Staff College. The equivalent in the Royal Navy was the Royal Naval Staff College, Greenwich, and the equivalent in the Royal Air Force was the RAF Staff College, Bracknell.

== Origins ==
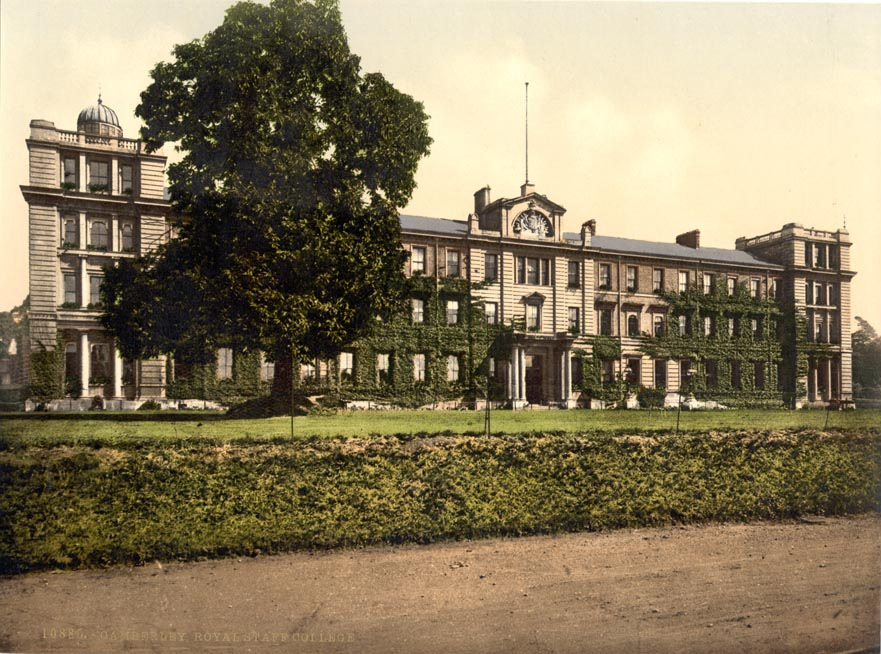
Old print of the College

In 1799, Colonel John Le Marchant submitted a proposal to the Duke of York, the Commander-in-Chief of the Forces, for a Royal Military College. A private officer training school, based on the idea of a senior or staff department in the proposed college, was opened in the same year by Colonel Le Marchant, at the Antelope Inn, High Wycombe, and designated the Royal Military College, High Wycombe, with himself as commandant. This facility was officially recognised by royal warrant in 1801 as the senior department of the Royal Military College which was to open at a large house in 1802 in Great Marlow. Le Marchant was now appointed as Lieutenant-Governor and Superintendent-General of the College.

The course lasted for two years and in 1808 was specifically stated as intended to train future commanding officers and staff officers. Until 1858, students were required to pay to attend. The senior department of the Royal Military College moved to a building in West Street in Farnham, Surrey, in 1813 and in 1820 joined the junior department (which trained aspiring officers before they were commissioned) at Sandhurst.

== Decline, independence and growth ==
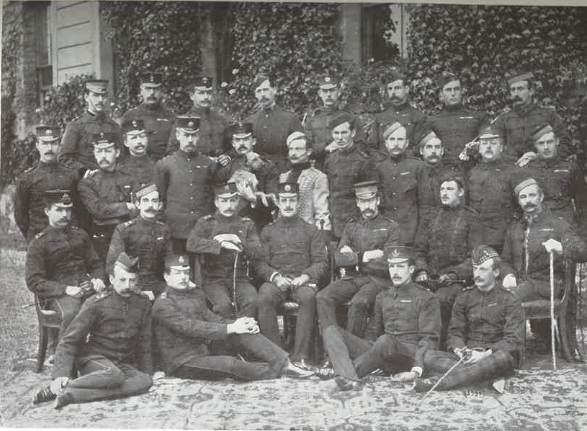
Officers who attended the Staff College, Camberley, from 1890–1891. Many went on to achieve high rank in the First World War.

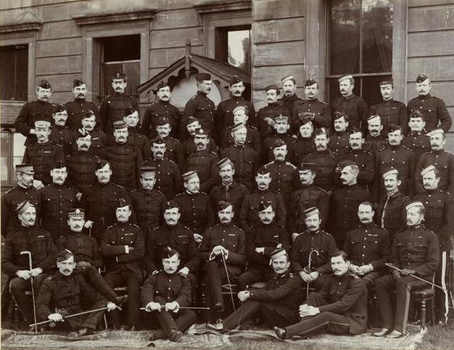
Officers, many of whom later became generals, at the Staff College, Camberley, in 1897. Among those pictured are three future field marshals, Allenby, Haig and Robertson.

The college underwent a decline and by 1857 the annual admissions had fallen to just six. In 1858 the name was changed to "the Staff College" and it was made independent of the Royal Military College in 1870. It now had its own commandant and adjutant, although continued to be administered by Sandhurst until 1911. Proper entry and final examinations had been introduced for the primarily military subjects taught. Purpose-built premises were approved in 1858 and built between 1859 and 1863 to a design by James Pennethorne, adjacent to the Royal Military College (but over the county boundary in Camberley). During the 1870s there were just forty students although numbers increased to sixty students in the 1880s. In 1903 officers of the colonial forces were allowed to join the college, and in 1905 naval officers were introduced.

With the threat of a second war with Germany, the college was expanded and restructured in 1938, with a junior wing at Camberley for officers of an average age of 29 years, and a senior wing at Minley Manor, Farnborough, for graduates of the school returned for further training, and aged about 35 years.

In 1994 it was announced that a new Joint Services Command and Staff College would replace the Staff College, the Royal Naval Staff College, RAF Staff College, and Joint Service Defence College in 1997.

== Current use ==
The buildings, now known as Robertson House, were retained by the Ministry of Defence, and are used by a number of occupants, including the following:

- The Centre for Army Leadership (CAL)
- Headquarters, Brigade of Gurkhas
- Headquarters, Army Medical Services
  - Regimental Headquarters, Royal Army Medical Service.
  - Regimental Headquarters, Royal Army Veterinary Corps

== Commandants ==
Commandant, Staff College, Sandhurst

- 1858–1861: Colonel Patrick Leonard McDougall
- 1861–1864: Colonel William Craig Emilius Napier
- 1865–1870: Colonel Thomas Edgar Lacy

Commandants since the College gained its independence in 1870 have been:

- 1870–1878 Major-General Edward Bruce Hamley
- Feb–May 1878 Major-General Sir Archibald Alison
- 1878–1885 Major-General Charles Creagh-Osborne
- 1885–1888 Major-General Edward Clive

Commandant, Staff College, Camberley

- 1888–1893 Colonel Francis Clery
- 1893–1898 Colonel Henry Hildyard
- 1898–1903 Colonel Herbert Miles
- 1903–1906 Colonel Sir Henry Rawlinson
- 1907–1910 Brigadier-General Henry Wilson
- 1910–1913 Major-General Sir William Robertson
- 1913–1914 Brigadier-General Launcelot Kiggell

Note the college was closed during the War

- 1919–1922 Major-General Hastings Anderson
- 1922–1926 Major-General Sir Edmund Ironside
- 1926–1931 Major-General Charles Gwynn
- 1931–1934 Major-General John Dill
- 1934–1936 Major-General Clement Armitage
- 1936–1937 Major-General Viscount Gort
- 1937–1938 Major-General Sir Ronald Adam
- 1938–1939 Major-General Bernard Paget
- 1939–1941 Major-General Robert Collins
- 1941–1942 Major-General Montagu Stopford
- 1942–1943 Major-General Sir Alan Cunningham
- 1943–1944 Major-General Douglas Wimberley
- 1944–1946 Major-General Philip Gregson-Ellis
- 1946–1948 Major-General Richard Hull
- 1948–1951 Major-General Dudley Ward
- 1951–1954 Major-General Gerald Lathbury
- 1954–1956 Major-General Charles Jones
- 1957–1958 Major-General Nigel Poett
- 1958–1961 Major-General Reginald Hewetson
- 1961–1963 Major-General Charles Harington
- 1963–1966 Major-General John Worsley
- 1966–1967 Major-General Mervyn Butler
- 1967–1970 Major-General John Sharp
- 1970–1972 Major-General Allan Taylor
- 1972–1974 Major-General Patrick Howard-Dobson
- 1974–1975 Major-General Hugh Beach
- 1975–1978 Major-General John Stanier
- 1978–1980 Major-General Frank Kitson
- 1980–1982 Major-General David Alexander-Sinclair
- 1982–1984 Major-General John Akehurst
- 1984–1986 Major-General Patrick Palmer
- 1986–1988 Major-General John Waters
- 1988–1989 Major-General John Learmont
- Mar–Dec 1989 Major-General Jeremy Mackenzie
- 1989–1991 Major-General William Rous
- 1991–1993 Major-General Michael Rose
- 1993–1994 Major-General Christopher Wallace
- 1994–1996 Major-General Anthony Pigott

== See also ==
- psc (military)
