= David Fraser (British Army officer) =

British Army general (1920–2012)

General Sir David Fraser GCB OBE
- Born: 30 December 1920; Camberley, Surrey, England
- Died: 15 July 2012 (aged 91); East Hampshire, England
- Burial place: Holy Cross Churchyard, Binsted, East Hampshire, England
- Spouse: Anne Balfour-Fraser (m. 1947; div. 1952)
- Relatives: Brigadier William Fraser (father)
- Military career
- Allegiance: United Kingdom
- Branch: British Army
- Service years: 1940–1980
- Rank: General
- Service number: 184424
- Unit: Grenadier Guards
- Commands: Royal College of Defence Studies (1978–1980); 4th Division (1969–1971)
- Conflicts: Second World War; Malayan Emergency; Suez Crisis; Cyprus Emergency
- Awards: Knight Grand Cross of the Order of the Bath; Officer of the Order of the British Empire

General Sir David William Fraser, GCB, OBE (30 December 1920 – 15 July 2012) was a senior British Army officer who served as Commandant of the Royal College of Defence Studies from 1978 until his retirement from military service in 1980. He was also a prolific author, publishing over 20 books mostly focused on the history of the Second World War.

== Early life ==
Fraser was born on 30 December 1920. He was the son of Brigadier William Fraser, the younger son of the 19th Lord Saltoun, and Pamela Maude, widow of Billy Congreve a Victoria Cross recipient and daughter of actors Cyril Maude and Winifred Emery. He was educated at Eton College. He left school to join the British Army but was refused. Instead, in January 1940, he matriculated at Christ Church, Oxford.

== Military career ==
While studying at the University of Oxford, Fraser joined the Home Defence Force. In October 1940, he was training at the Guards' Depot in Caterham, Surrey. He was streamlined during training before taking an intensive four-month course at the Royal Military Academy Sandhurst. He was commissioned into the Grenadier Guards as a second lieutenant on 4 April 1941. He was given the service number 184424. His first posting was as a troop commander in the 2nd Battalion, 5th Guards Armoured Brigade, part of the Guards Armoured Division. In the last two years of the Second World War, he was involved in the North West Europe Campaign. He finished the war as a war substantive lieutenant.

On 27 February 1946, Fraser's promotion to lieutenant was confirmed with seniority from 30 June 1943. On 30 December 1947, he was promoted to captain. He served as a company commander in the 3rd Battalion, Grenadier Guards in the Malayan Emergency of 1948. Having attended Staff College, he was promoted to major on 30 December 1954. He was involved in the Suez Crisis in 1956 and the Cyprus Emergency in 1958. He was made a brevet lieutenant-colonel on 1 July 1959. On 6 June 1960, he was promoted to that rank.

Appointed an Officer of the Order of the British Empire in 1962, Fraser was posted to the Ministry of Defence as Director of Defence Policy (Army) from December 1966 until 1969. He was appointed General Officer Commanding 4th Division in 1969, and Assistant Chief of Defence Staff (Policy) in 1971. He was Vice Chief of the General Staff from April 1973, and was knighted as a Knight Commander of the Order of the Bath later that year. He went on to be UK Military Representative to NATO in 1975, and Commandant of the Royal College of Defence Studies in 1978 before retiring in 1980. He had been advanced to Knight Grand Cross of the Order of the Bath just prior to his retirement.

== Later life ==
Fraser was president of the Society for Army Historical Research from 1980 to 1993.

== Personal life ==
In 1947 he married Anne Balfour-Fraser but they divorced in 1952; they had one daughter (Antonia Isabella Fraser). In 1957 he married Julia Frances Oldridge de la Hey; they had two sons (Alexander James Fraser and Simon William Fraser) and two daughters (Lucy Caroline Fraser and Arabella Katherine Fraser).

== Books ==
He was the author of the following books:

- Knight's Cross: A Life of Field Marshal Erwin Rommel
- Frederick the Great: King of Prussia
- And We Shall Shock Them: British Army in the Second World War
- Alanbrooke
- The Grenadier Guards (Men at Arms Series, 73)
- Fairest Isle: BBC Radio 3 Book of British Music
- The Fortunes of War
- The Christian Watt Papers
- Wales in History: The Defenders, 1066–1485 Bk. 2
- Codename Mercury (Hardrow Chronicles)
- Around the House
- Wars and Shadows : Memoirs of General Sir David Fraser
- A Candle for Judas (Treason in Arms)
- Dragon's Teeth (Treason in Arms)
- The Pain of Winning (Hardrow Chronicles)
- Imperatives for Defence (Policy challenge), 1990
- Adam Hardrow (Hardrow Chronicles)
- Adam in the Breach (Hardrow Chronicles)
- The Killing Times (Treason in Arms)
- The Seizure (Treason in Arms)
- Wellington and the Waterloo Campaign (Wellington Lectures), March 1996
- August 1988
- To War with Whitaker: Wartime Diaries of the Countess of Ranfurly, 1939–45, (Reed Audio) with Hermione, Countess of Ranfurly, and Imogen Stubbs (Audio Cassette, 1995)
- Kiss for the Enemy (Thorndike Large Print Popular Series)

Military offices
Preceded by Vernon Erskine-Crum	GOC 4th Division; 1969–1971	Succeeded by Anthony Farrar-Hockley
Preceded by Sir Cecil Blacker	Vice Chief of the General Staff; 1973–1975	Succeeded by Sir William Scotter
Preceded by Sir Rae McKaig	UK Military Representative to NATO; 1975–1977	Succeeded by Sir Alasdair Steedman
Preceded by Sir Ian Easton	Commandant of the Royal College of Defence Studies; 1978–1980	Succeeded by Sir Robert Freer
