= 228th Regiment =

228th Regiment may refer to:

- 228th Aviation Regiment, United States
- 228th Infantry Regiment, United States
- 228th Motor Rifle Regiment, Russia

== See also ==
- 228th Brigade (disambiguation)
- 228th (disambiguation)
