= 228th Division =

228th Division may refer to:

- 228th Infantry Division (Wehrmacht), Germany
- 228th Rifle Division, Soviet Union

== See also ==
- List of military divisions by number
- 228th Brigade (disambiguation)
- 228th Regiment (disambiguation)
- 228th (disambiguation)
