= Alice Holt Research Station =

Research institute in Hampshire, England

Coordinates: 51.178643°N 0.852193°W

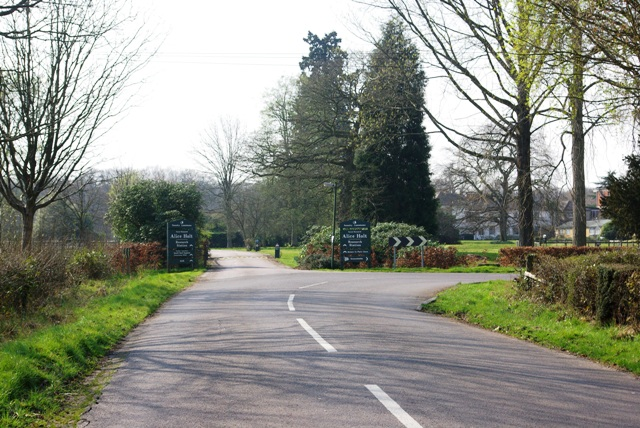
- Field of research: Forestry
- Chief Scientist: Bianca Ambrose-Oji
- Location: Alice Holt Forest, Hampshire, UK
- Operating agency: Forestry Research
- Website: Forestry Research

The Alice Holt Research Station is one of two British forestry research institutes, and is located in north-east Hampshire.

== History ==
It was established as a Forestry Research Station in 1946 by the Forestry Commission near Wrecclesham. The forest estate had 1,225,000 acres.

By the late 1950s it had an international reputation. A £134,000 extension was opened in the summer of 1959, which enable the Commission to have its central seed store at the site for varieties such as Douglas-fir, Sitka spruce, Corsican pine, and Norway spruce. The store was mostly for conifers, keeping seeds up to four years. and also acorns had been stored up to three years.

More laboratories were added in the late 1970s.

=== Research ===
In 1948, it began experimenting with Metasequoia glyptostroboides, the dawn redwood, with a view to produce timber.

In the late 1950s, its scientists were among the first people to investigate biological data with computers, when they discovered why the Douglas-fir did not grow well in south-east England, which they found was due to temperature and rooting depth. It was through computers that many solutions were found. The station found a new way to determine daily tree growth with vernier scales. Computers investigated ways to classify trees by leaf character. It notably conducted research into eucalyptus and poplar trees.

In April 1973, it found that Dutch elm disease had been imported on Rock Elm logs from North America. The disease had first appeared in 1965. The disease had originally been shipped to the North America from Britain in the 1930s. The disease in Britain had then become less known. There were outbreaks of the disease in 1965 in north Gloucestershire and in 1967 in south Essex. Two scientists at the station discovered two strains of the disease. The areas affected were southern Hampshire, north-west Kent, the Severn valley, and Ipswich. The scientists realised that these outbreaks could have been prevented by controlling imports of logs. It had been assumed that as Britain had the disease in the 1930s that trees would not be affected. By 1984 Dutch elm disease had reached Scotland. Other diseases of trees to be controlled were Oak wilt and Chestnut blight.

In 1973, it looked at ways to control the grey squirrel.

=== Chief Research Officers ===
- Professor Malcolm Laurie, 1946 - October 1959
- Tom Peace, October 1959 -
- David Burdekin
- Alan Fletcher
- Prof Julian Evans, 1984-1997
- Dr Peter Freer-Smith, 1998-2009

=== Chief Scientists ===
- Prof Peter Freer-Smith, 2009-2017
- Prof Chris Quine, 2018-2025
- Prof Bianca Ambrose-Oji, June 2025

== Structure ==
It is situated next to Birdworld in the Alice Holt Forest in East Hampshire off the A325, east of Bentley railway station on the Alton Line, which follows the River Wey. The nearest inhabitation is Rowledge in Surrey, on the Hampshire boundary. Although now in Hampshire, similar to Birdworld, the site is in the religious parish of Rowledge in Surrey.
