= Bucks Horn Oak =

Village in Hampshire, England

Coordinates: 51.168°N 0.845°W

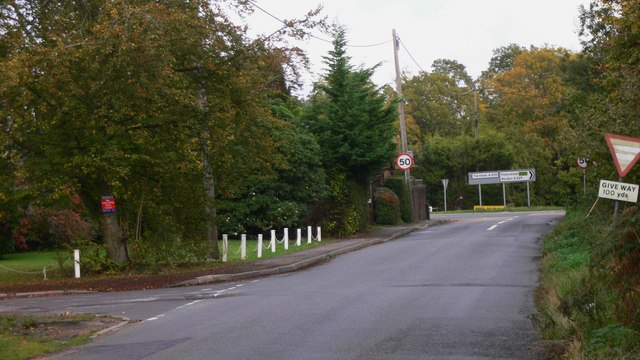
- Lane south with side road into the modest developed area. The lane leads from the main road shown in the background to Binsted village

- Location within Hampshire
- Population: 406 as at the 2011 Census
- OS grid reference: SU807417
- Civil parish: Binsted
- District: East Hampshire
- Shire county: Hampshire
- Region: South East
- Country: England
- Sovereign state: United Kingdom
- Post town: Farnham
- Postcode district: GU10
- Dialling code: 01420
- Police: Hampshire and Isle of Wight
- Fire: Hampshire and Isle of Wight
- Ambulance: South Central
- UK Parliament: East Hampshire

Bucks Horn Oak is a small village in the East Hampshire district of Hampshire, England and is the main community within Alice Holt Forest. A small eastern part consists of buildings facing its main road and of the main management and tourist sites of the surrounding public forest, postally part of the place. In the Church of England the community and all land as far as Bentley railway station (Hampshire) is in a parish mainly in Surrey, a larger community on the north-east of the forest, Rowledge. In the secular, civil parishes in England, it is in the parish of Binsted, equating to the third tier of local government, namely Binsted Civil Parish Council.

It is well clustered community mostly of low-rise, detached houses immediately west of the north-south A325 road, which is the link between Bordon and the southern A3 (such as Petersfield and Portsmouth) to Farnham.

== Setting and housing ==
The place consists of 114 addresses (some for businesses sharing a building) otherwise houses, mostly with hedges and small gardens and verges of the 20th century in the Alice Holt Forest, covering about 3% of the forest's area. The balance of houses are 19th and approximately five are 21st century, having replaced mobile homes.

Its nearest town is Farnham, 5 miles (8.0 km) north north-east, geodesically (as the crow flies) and a similar distance by the direct road. It is the village immediately south of Birdworld, the largest UK avian zoological park and learning centre.

== Economy ==
A few businesses/employers cluster immediately east, near the largest car park of the forest.

A MOT centre and a fencing/gate supplier are small businesses using land fronting the east of the main road, associated with Halfway Farm which consists of one field.
