= Samuel Anderson Emery =

English stage actor (1841–1881)

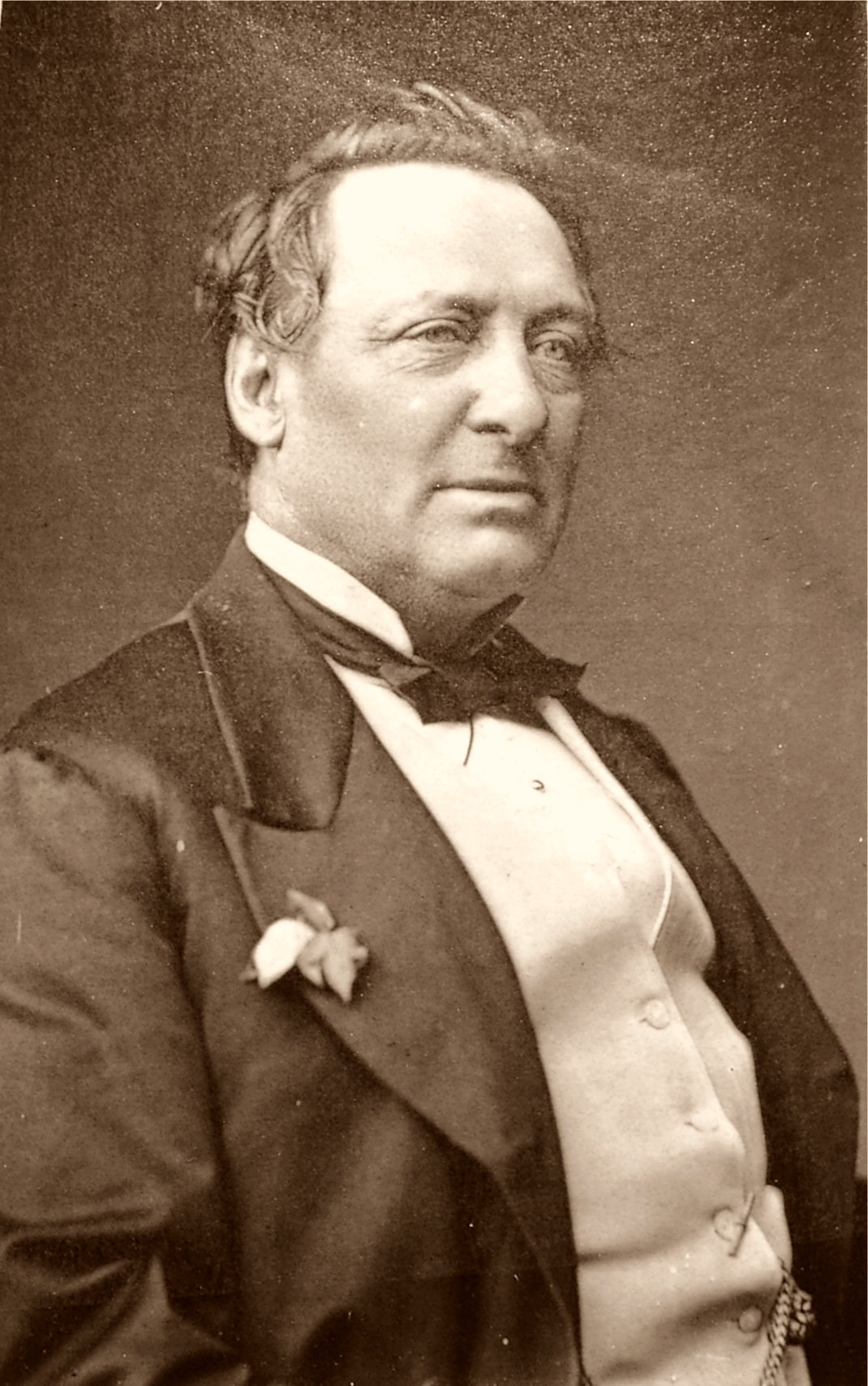
Samuel Anderson Emery

Samuel Anderson Emery (1814–1881) was an English stage actor, the father of the actress Winifred Emery and grandfather of the actress Margery Maude and the judge John Cyril Maude.

== Early life ==
The son of John Emery, he was born in Hyde Street, Bloomsbury, 10 September 1817. He was educated at Bridport Hall, Edmonton, under W. Fitch, both a schoolmaster and the lessee of the City Theatre, Milton Street. On leaving school he was placed with his uncle, John Thompson, an Irish provision dealer, and became also clerk to a stockbroker, and subsequently to a jeweller and goldsmith.

In May 1834 Emery appeared at the Queen's Theatre, Tottenham Street (then known as the Fitzroy), in his father's character of Dan in John Bull. Then under the name of Anderson he played at the same house as Robin Roughhead, and assumably in other parts. He worked at Kingston upon Hull for Downe, the manager of the York circuit, went in 1835 to Edinburgh under Murray, and played in some smaller Scottish houses. He then became established in Liverpool, and for several years played there, at Manchester, Chester, and neighbouring towns.

== On the London stage ==
As Giles in The Miller's Maid, and Lovegold in The Miser, Downe made, 18 April 1843, at the Lyceum Theatre, his first appearance in London. He was engaged by Henry Wallack for Covent Garden, and appeared there 19 October 1843 as Fixture in A Roland for an Oliver. Here, it is said, a thwarted stage carpenter attempted his murder. In 1844 he was at the Lyceum under Robert and Mary Ann Keeley, and established his reputation.

Emery then joined Leigh Murray at the Olympic Theatre, was stage-manager for Charles Shepherd at the Surrey Theatre, and went in 1850 to Drury Lane, then under James Robertson Anderson. He played at country houses during the summer, and at Drury Lane was seen in many parts. He then joined B. Webster of the Haymarket and Adelphi. At the Olympic in 1853 under Alfred Sydney Wigan he was the original Fouché in Tom Taylor's Plot and Passion, and was subsequently Mr. Potter in the Still Waters run deep, again by Taylor. He was seldom long at any theatre. He was in 1857 manager for a short time of the Marylebone Theatre.

== Later life ==
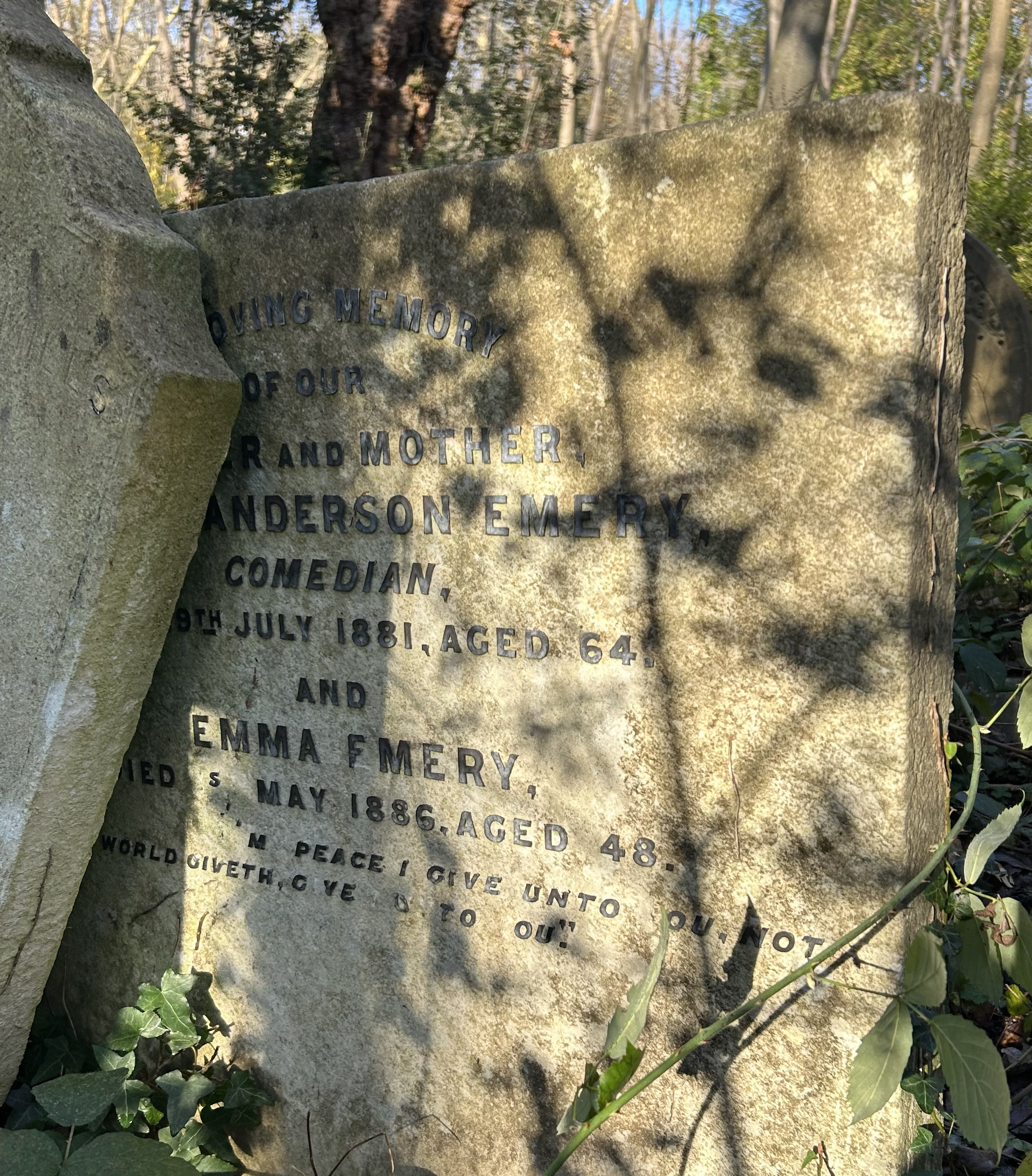
Grave of Samuel Anderson Emery in Highgate Cemetery

Some time around 1860 Emery went to America, but returned shortly after disagreements with his managers. In November 1864 he appeared at the Theatre Royal in Dublin in the first performance of Dion Boucicault's Arrah-na-Pogue with Boucicault, Samuel Johnson and John Brougham in the cast. In Australia also, towards the end of his life, he was not a success. Six weeks after his return from Australia he died, 19 July 1881, of erysipelas at King William Street, Strand, London. He was buried on the eastern side of Highgate Cemetery.

== Notes ==
Attribution

This article incorporates text from a publication now in the public domain: Stephen, Leslie, ed. (1889). "Emery, Samuel Anderson". Dictionary of National Biography. Vol. 17. London: Smith, Elder & Co.
