= 1808 English cricket season =

Cricket season review

The 1808 English cricket season was the 22nd since the foundation of Marylebone Cricket Club (MCC). George Osbaldeston made his debut in historically important matches. Details of six matches are known. (Note: Any match listed in the ACS' Important Match Guide (1981) is historically important, and therefore of the highest standard, whether or not a scorecard might exist. The same applies to numerous matches discovered by researchers since 1981. For further information, see First-class cricket.)

== Events ==
- With the Napoleonic War continuing, loss of investment and manpower impacted cricket and only six matches have been recorded in 1808:
  - 23–24 May: Marylebone Cricket Club (MCC) v Middlesex @ Lord's Old Ground
  - 30–31 May: MCC v Middlesex @ Lord's Old Ground
  - 6–7 June: MCC v Homerton @ Lord's Old Ground
  - 27–29 June: England v Surrey @ Lord's Old Ground
  - 6–7 July: England v Surrey @ Lord's Old Ground
  - 11–13 July: Surrey v England @ Holt Pound, Farnham

== Bibliography ==
- ACS (1981). A Guide to Important Cricket Matches Played in the British Isles 1709–1863. Nottingham: ACS. OCLC 85045528.
- Haygarth, Arthur (1996) [1862]. Scores & Biographies, Volume 1 (1744–1826). Kennington: Frederick Lillywhite. ISBN 978-19-00592-23-9.
- Warner, Pelham (1946). Lords: 1787–1945. London: Harrap. OCLC 877106024.
