= Holt Pound =

Hampshire hamlet and cricket ground

Coordinates: 51.1858°N 0.8343°W

- Location within Hampshire
- OS grid reference: SU8069441694
- Civil parish: Binsted
- District: East Hampshire
- Shire county: Hampshire
- Region: South East
- Country: England
- Sovereign state: United Kingdom
- Post town: Farnham
- Postcode district: GU10
- Dialling code: 01420
- Police: Hampshire and Isle of Wight
- Fire: Hampshire and Isle of Wight
- Ambulance: South Central

Holt Pound is a hamlet on the A325 road and two side roads and forms a slight projection of the county borders into Surrey in the East Hampshire district of Hampshire, England. It is between Bordon several miles south and Farnham, which is beyond a strip of its nearest village, Rowledge, which remains its ecclesiastical parish in Surrey and Wrecclesham which touches the town. The village is between the Alice Holt Forest and fields known jointly as Old Kiln Farm and the Holt Pound Enclosure.

Holt Pound has a large 20th-century pub-restaurant beside a recreation ground which is known as Holt Pound Oval. The Oval is a former a cricket ground, now registered as a village green. It was established in the 1780s until just after World War I, and was sometimes used by Surrey county teams for top-class matches.

== Cricket ground ==
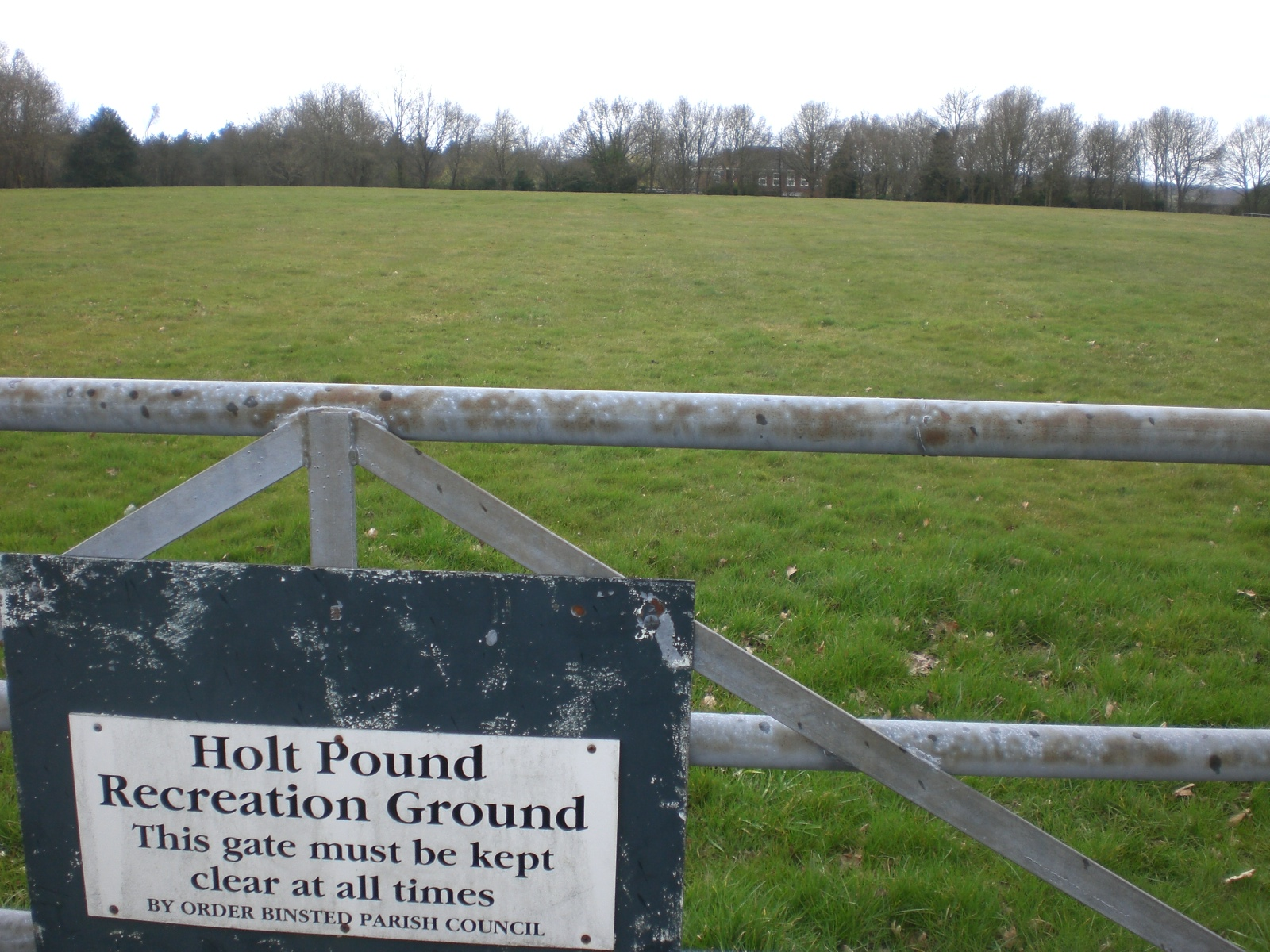
Holt Pound cricket ground in 2010

The origin of the Holt Pound cricket ground is uncertain but it had been established by 30 July 1784 when it was used for a Farnham v Odiham & Alton match. Holt Pound Oval may have been owned by Henry Bilson-Legge, 2nd Baron Stawell (1757–1820), who was a Hambledon Club member. He became Lord Stawell in 1780 and, soon afterwards, commissioned Billy Beldham to lay out the cricket pitch. Beldham and Stawell played together for Farnham in 1784. Big matches were not new to the area as, much earlier, on Tuesday, 26 August 1729, an inter-county match was played in Farnham at an unspecified location between Surrey and Kent.

The Holt Pound ground is known locally as "the Oval" (the current venue of that name did not become a cricket ground until 1845, so there is no connection). Several Surrey matches of the period were contested at Holt Pound Oval including one in 1808 when Surrey beat England by 66 runs.

After Farnham left the ground, to take up residence at a pitch created near the moat of Farnham Castle, thanks to a past Bishop of Winchester, who wished to tidy up part of the Farnham Park, the ground was made available to other clubs and the local population to play cricket.

An anonymous writer in 1862 wrote that the residents of Wrecclesham, a small community that was supposedly 'riddled with drunkenness and vice', would play there every Sunday. They would play for a 'pint or a pot', meaning that the winners would be rewarded with pints of beer paid for by the losing side.

There is a record of Rowledge Cricket Club playing there that appears in 1886 with a match at recorded against Tilford. Until 1914 the club played its home matches at the Holt Pound ground. Furthermore, the local Wrecclesham village teams also went on to play all of their home fixtures there, from their inception in 1901 until 1922.

When the cricket teams returned to play after the First World War, the ground was in a terrible state. According to one player at the time 'Ponies were allowed to graze there, we often had to take a shovel to the pitch before we could start a match'. Unsurprisingly, Wrecclesham left a couple of years later, when a pitch became available within the grounds of Runwick House.

Holt Pound Oval in 2022 is registered as a village green that has drainage issues and cannot be developed. Binsted Parish Council has established a working group that will seek ways to gain best value from the land for the benefit of the community.

== Bibliography ==
- Buckley, G. B. (1935). Fresh Light on 18th Century Cricket. Birmingham: Cotterell & Co. ISBN 978-19-00592-48-2.
- Haygarth, Arthur (1862). Scores & Biographies, Volume 1 (1744–1826). Kennington: Frederick Lillywhite. ISBN 978-19-00592-23-9.
- Maun, Ian (2009). From Commons to Lord's, Volume One: 1700 to 1750. Roger Heavens. ISBN 978-19-00592-52-9.
- Underdown, David (2000). Start of Play. Westminster: Allen Lane. ISBN 978-07-13993-30-1.
