= Rolf Dudley-Williams =

British politician (1908–1987)

Sir Rolf Dudley-Williams Bt

Member of Parliament for Exeter
- In office 25 October 1951 – 10 March 1966
- Preceded by: John Maude
- Succeeded by: Gwyneth Dunwoody

Personal details
- Born: 17 June 1908 Plymouth, Devon, England
- Died: 8 October 1987 (aged 79)
- Party: Conservative
- Spouse: Margaret Helen Robinson
- Children: 2
- Occupation: Aeronautical engineer

Sir Rolf Dudley Dudley-Williams, 1st Baronet (17 June 1908 – 8 October 1987), born Rolf Dudley Williams, was a British aeronautical engineer and Conservative Party politician.

== Royal Air Force career ==
Williams was born in Plymouth and is the son of master draper Arthur Henry Williams (1872-1922) and Minnie Jane (d. 1924), née Edgcumbe. He was educated at Plymouth College and joined the Royal Air Force cadet scheme in 1926 and studied at the Royal Air Force College at Cranwell. He was gazetted in 1928 and appointed a Flying Officer in 1930. From 1933, he was stationed at the Central Flying School, but the next year an injury saw him invalided out of the service.

== Jet engines ==
Deciding to go into business, Williams joined with fellow Cranwell pupil Frank Whittle and fellow ex-RAF officer James Collingwood Tinling to set up Power Jets Ltd in 1936 to develop Whittle's idea of jet engines for aircraft. In 1941, he was appointed Managing Director, and in 1943 he joined the Council of the Society of British Aircraft Constructors and was made a Companion of the Royal Aeronautical Society in 1944.

== Politics ==
At the 1950 general election, Williams was a Conservative candidate for Brierley Hill in Staffordshire but lost to Labour. He was then selected for Exeter, a Conservative held seat, and won it at the 1951 general election.

== Parliament ==
While Williams concentrated on the aircraft industry and the RAF, he also introduced his own Private Member's Bill to extend the legal protection against poaching in 1952. During the December 1954 controversy over Rudolph Cartier's television adaptation of Nineteen Eighty-Four by George Orwell, Williams was one of five Conservative MPs who jointly tabled a motion in the House of Commons that attacked "the tendency, evident in recent British Broadcasting Corporation television programmes, notably on Sunday evenings, to pander to sexual and sadistic tastes".

Williams' campaign to retain his seat at the 1955 general election was helped by Sir Frank Whittle, who had attempted to convert Williams to socialism while at Cranwell but was forcefully opposed to nationalisation after his treatment by Labour ministers in the 1940s. After his re-election, Williams advocated a hawkish approach to Egypt on the Suez issue, and supported police crackdowns on demonstrations for nuclear disarmament.

He served as a Parliamentary Private Secretary to the Secretary of State for War in 1958, and to the Minister of Agriculture from 1960 to 1964. From the 1960s he made a specialism of opposing other MPs' Private Members' Bills, especially from Labour MPs. He helped Winston Churchill take his seat when Churchill made a rare appearance in the House of Commons chamber in 1963. On 29 June 1964 he adopted the new surname of Dudley-Williams by Deed Poll. He was created a baronet of the City and County of the City of Exeter on 2 July 1964.

== Later career ==
After an adverse swing at the 1964 general election, Dudley-Williams lost his seat in 1966. Although taking some business appointments, he effectively retired from politics. However, in January 1975 during the Conservative Party leadership election, he joined with five other former Conservative MPs to write a letter to The Times urging Edward Heath to "now make way, so that the undoubted talents and leadership which he has kept muffled on the back benches should be given a chance to come to the fore". He is the grandfather of journalist Marina Hyde.

== Arms ==
Coat of arms of Rolf Dudley-Williams

Crest
In front of a castle as in the arms a wild cat rampant guardant Proper.
Escutcheon
Gules a chevron engrailed plain cotised between in chief two cranes respectant Proper and in base a triangular castle of three towers Or.
Motto
Cave Felem

Parliament of the United Kingdom
Preceded by John Maude	Member of Parliament for Exeter; 1951–1966	Succeeded by Gwyneth Dunwoody
Baronetage of the United Kingdom
New title Granted by Queen Elizabeth II	Baronet (of Exeter); 1964–1987	Succeeded by Alastair Dudley-Williams
