= Marina Hyde =

British journalist

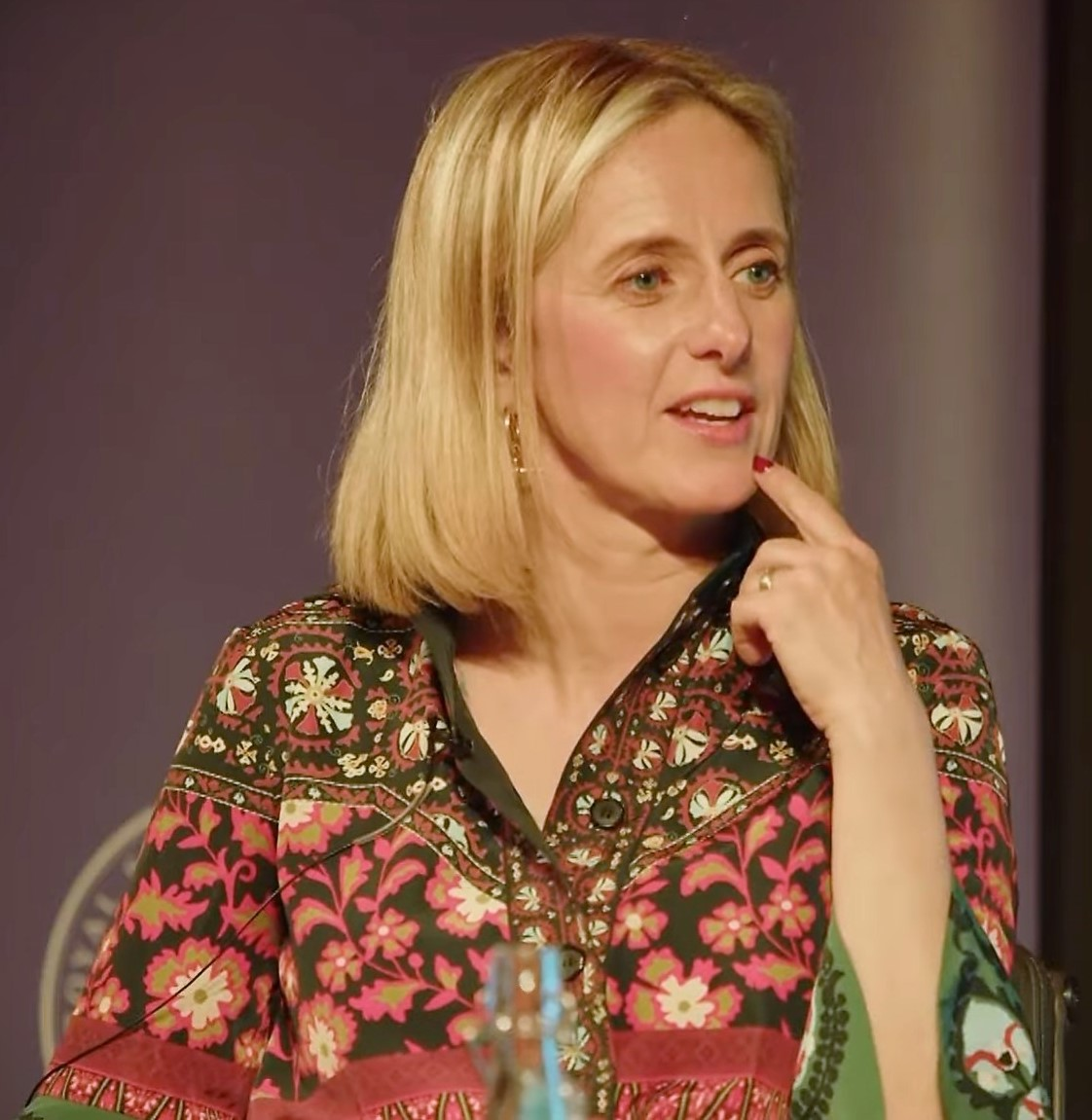
- Hyde in 2022
- Born: Marina Elizabeth Catherine Dudley-Williams; 13 May 1974 (age 52); London, England
- Education: Downe House School; University of Oxford
- Occupation: Journalist
- Employer(s): The Sun; The Guardian
- Spouse: Kieran Clifton (m. 1999)
- Children: 3
- Parent(s): Sir Alastair Edgcumbe James Dudley-Williams, 2nd Baronet, and Diana Elizabeth Jane Duncan
- Relatives: Sir Rolf Dudley-Williams, 1st Baronet (grandfather)
- Website: www.theguardian.com/profile/marinahyde https://www.marinahyde.com/

Marina Hyde (born Marina Elizabeth Catherine Dudley-Williams; 13 May 1974) is an English journalist. She was a columnist for The Guardian between 2000 and 2026.

== Early life and education ==
Hyde was born at St George's Hospital, London, the daughter of Sir Alastair Edgcumbe James Dudley-Williams, 2nd Baronet, and his wife, the former Diana Elizabeth Jane Duncan. Through her father, she is the granddaughter of aviation pioneer and Conservative politician Sir Rolf Dudley-Williams, 1st Baronet. Hyde was privately educated at Downe House School, near Newbury in Berkshire, and read English as an undergraduate student at Christ Church, University of Oxford.

== Career ==
Hyde's career has included work at The Sun and The Guardian.

=== The Sun ===
Hyde began her career in journalism as a temporary secretary on the "Showbiz" desk at The Sun newspaper. In an otherwise unrelated article in The Guardian, she wrote: "I am only called Marina Hyde because my real name was too long to fit across a single column in The Sun, where I started out." She was later sacked by Sun editor David Yelland after it emerged she had been exchanging e-mails with Piers Morgan, editor of rival newspaper the Daily Mirror.

=== The Guardian ===
Between 2000 and 2026, Hyde worked for The Guardian, at first writing the newspaper's Diary column. She was nominated as Columnist of the Year in the 2010 British Press Awards.

Elton John unsuccessfully sued The Guardian for libel in relation to Hyde's spoof diary column "A peek at the diary of... 'Sir Elton John'", published in July 2008. Mr Justice Tugendhat ruled that the "irony" and "teasing" did not amount to defamation. Hyde published a follow-up diary of Elton John in 2009.

In November 2011, The Guardian apologised to The Sun for an article in which Hyde had falsely alleged the newspaper had visited the home of a member of the legal team of the Leveson Inquiry. In the front-page story Hyde had accused The Sun of "blowing a giant raspberry at Lord Justice Leveson’s inquiry". The Sun's then managing editor Richard Caseby sent a toilet roll accompanied by "a squalid note" to the then Guardian editor Alan Rusbridger after Hyde's false story.

Hyde has won awards for her journalism. In 2017 she was named Political Commentator of the Year at the Editorial Intelligence Comment Awards, as well as winning the Commentariat of the Year Award. At the 2018 Editorial Intelligence Comment Awards, she received the Commentator of the Year award. In 2019, she won Political Commentator of the Year at the National Press Awards. Also in 2019, she received the Columnist of the Year award at the British Journalism Awards. She won the same award again at the British Journalism Awards in 2020. In 2020 Hyde won the London Press Club's Edgar Wallace Award for writing or reporting of the highest quality.

Also in 2020, she became the first woman ever to win the Sports Journalist of the Year award at the British Sports Journalism Awards. Hyde received two awards from the Sports Journalists' Association (SJA) in February 2020, including Sports Journalist of the Year, making her the first woman to receive the award in its 43-year history. At the same event, she also won Sports Columnist of the Year. She had written columns during the year on Prime Minister Theresa May's decision to award a knighthood to Geoff Boycott, Tiger Woods's performance at the 2019 Masters, and male responses to the FIFA Women's World Cup that year.

Her final column for The Guardian was published on 2 October 2026.

=== Other work ===
Hyde's book about celebrity, Celebrity: How Entertainers Took Over the World and Why We Need an Exit Strategy, was published in 2009. What Just Happened?!, a collection of her Guardian columns written between 2016 and 2022, was published in 2022. She helped prepare and proofread Piers Morgan's The Insider: The Private Diaries of a Scandalous Decade, in the acknowledgments of which she is described as Morgan's "best friend". She appeared occasionally on the BBC's Newsnight Review.

Hyde has been a writer on HBO series Avenue 5 and in 2022, she was hired as a writing executive producer on an HBO pilot originating from director Sam Mendes about the process of superhero filmmaking in Hollywood, called The Franchise. The series premiered on 6 October 2024 and was cancelled after one season.

In November 2023, Hyde began hosting a podcast with Richard Osman, titled The Rest Is Entertainment.

== Personal life ==
In 1999, Hyde married Kieran Clifton, a director at the BBC. The couple had their first child in 2010, and their third child was born in the summer of 2014.
