= Cyril Maude =

British actor (1862–1951)

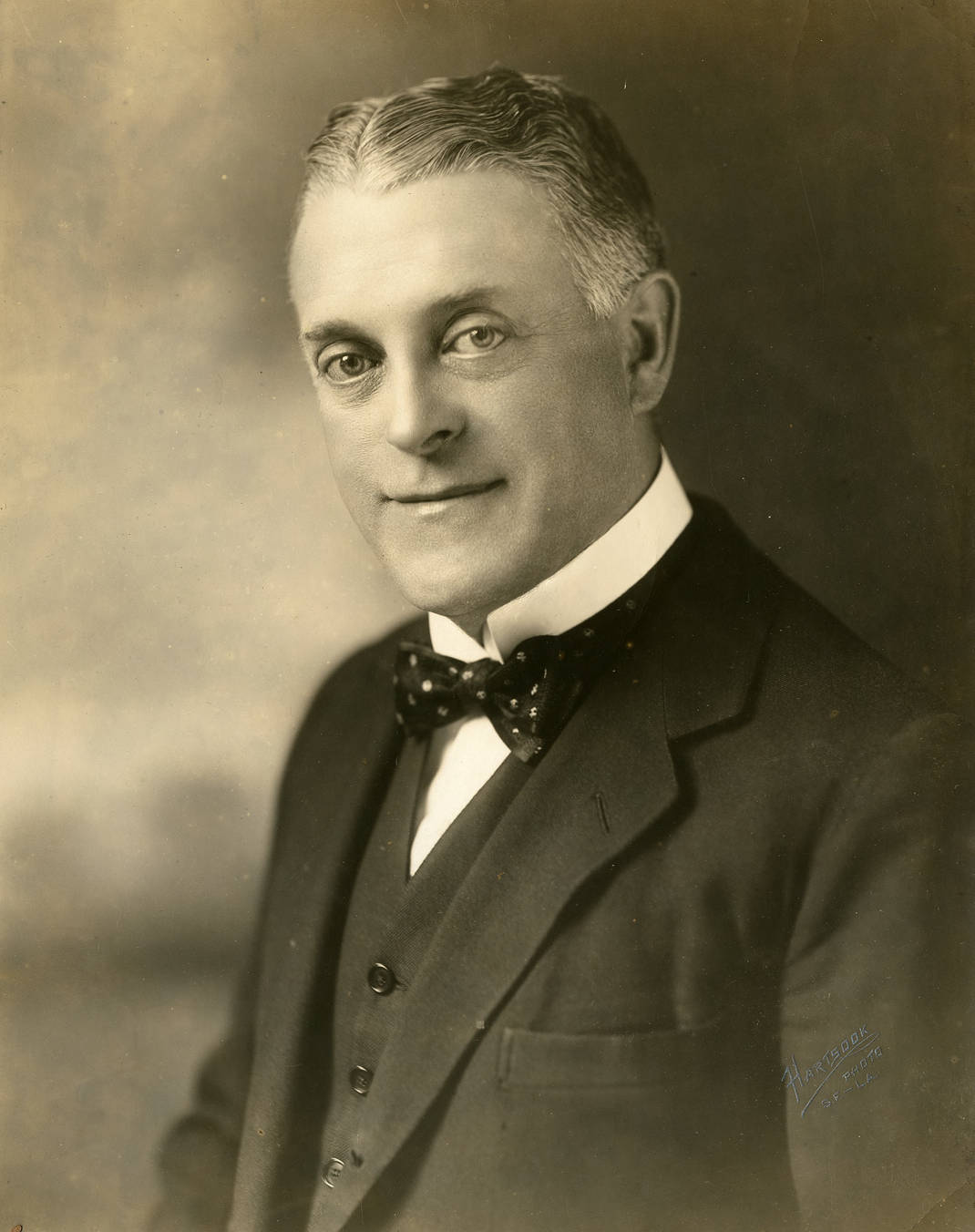
- Maude in 1918
- Born: Cyril Francis Maude; 24 April 1862; London, England
- Died: 20 February 1951 (aged 88); Torquay, Devon, U.K.
- Education: Wixenford; Charterhouse School
- Occupation: Actor-manager
- Years active: 1884–1947
- Spouse: Winifred Emery (m. 1888; died 1924)
- Children: 3, including Margery Maude and John Cyril Maude
- Family: David Gascoyne (great-nephew)

Cyril Francis Maude (24 April 1862 – 20 February 1951) was an English actor-manager.

== Biography ==
Maude was born in London and educated at Wixenford and Charterhouse School. In 1881, he was sent to Adelaide, South Australia, on the clipper ship City of Adelaide to regain his health. He returned to Britain without having regained his health, but nursing the ambition to be an actor.

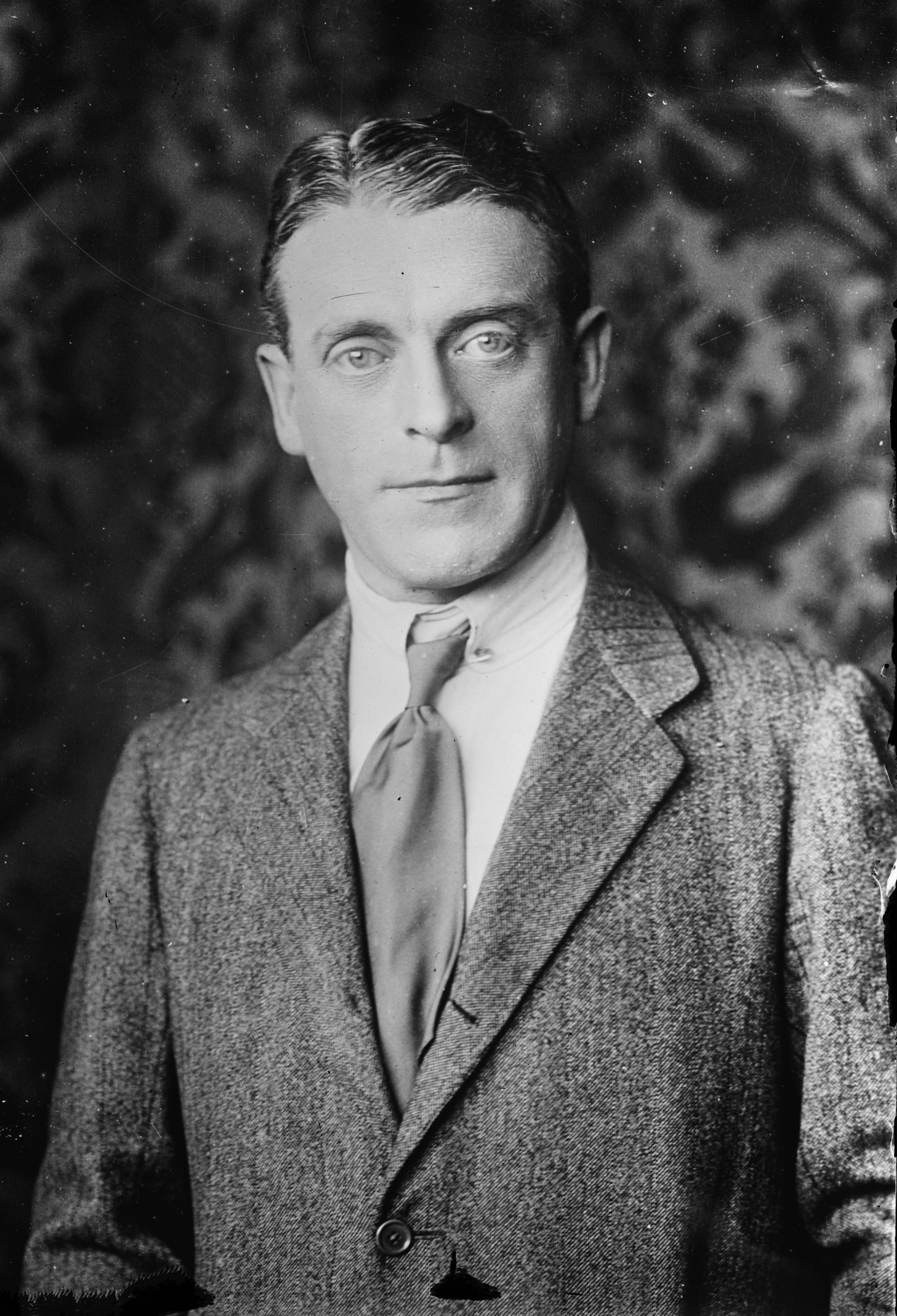
Maude circa 1913

He studied acting under Charles Cartwright and Roma Le Thiere, but was forced to leave the country again for health reasons. He travelled to Canada and America, fulfilling his acting ambition with Daniel Bandman's company in Denver, Colorado in 1884.

Between 1896 until 1905 he was co-manager of the Haymarket Theatre in London with Frederick Harrison. There he became known for his quietly humorous acting in many parts. However in 1900 he managed the production of the Little Minister at the Regent Theatre in Salford.

In 1906 he went into management on his own account, and in 1907 he opened the Playhouse, also in London. Between 1911 and 1919 he acted largely in the United States where he played new comedies. He returned to London in 1919 and established himself at the Criterion Theatre.

Maude became very well known for his role in Grumpy as a spoilt old man, who as a retired lawyer solved a crime to keep his loved ones happy. Maude took this play to Australia and toured Adelaide, Melbourne, Brisbane and Sydney where it was immensely popular. In 1923 he toured America with Lydia Bilbrook and Mabel Terry-Lewis in If Winter Comes, playing at Chicago in April and New York in the autumn.

== Films ==
He starred in several films in the 1930s, including Grumpy. In 1947, he appeared at the age of 85 in the film While the Sun Shines.

== Personal life ==
Winifred Emery with her children, c.1901

Maude was the eldest son of Captain Charles Henry Maude, a captain in the Indian Army, and the Honorable Georgina Hanbury-Tracy. His maternal grandfather was Thomas Hanbury-Tracy, 2nd Baron Sudeley.

In 1888, Maude married actress Winifred Emery, the daughter of Samuel Anderson Emery and granddaughter of John Emery, both well-known actors in their day. Their children included Margery Maude, who became an actress; Pamela Cynthia Maude (1893–1975); and John Cyril Maude, who became a barrister, judge and Member of Parliament. Pamela Maude married Major William La Touche Congreve VC, DSO, MC on 1 June 1916. He was killed in action on 20 July 1916 during World War I, for which he was posthumously awarded the Victoria Cross. On 22 December 1919 she married the Hon. William Fraser, DSO, MC (1890–1964), who later became a Brigadier.

They also brought up a niece, Winifred Isabel Emery (1890–1972), after the girl was abandoned by Emery's brother in 1895. This niece, together with her pupil Ruby Preece, was present when dramatist W. S. Gilbert died in his lake at Grim's Dyke in May 1911. Winifred Isabel Emery was the mother of poet David Gascoyne.

== Actors' Orphanage Fund ==
In 1905, Maude succeeded Sir Henry Irving as the President of the Actors' Orphanage Fund. During his tenure, he established the first orphanage for actors' children at Croydon, inaugurated innovative fundraising schemes and events, attracted royal patronage, and secured committee members from among leading actors of the day. He served until 1914.

== Death ==
Maude died at Torquay, Devon on 20 February 1951.

== Filmography ==
- Beauty and the Barge (1914)
- Peer Gynt (1915)
- The Greater Will (1915)
- The Headmaster (1921)
- Grumpy (1930)
- These Charming People (1931)
- Counsel's Opinion (1933)
- Orders Is Orders (1934)
- Girls Will Be Boys (1934)
- Heat Wave (1935)
- While the Sun Shines (1947)
