= James Wilson McKay =

Sir James Wilson McKay (12 March 1912 – 25 May 1992) was a Scottish businessman who served as Lord Provost of Edinburgh between 1969 and 1972. A Freemason, he was Grand Master of the Grand Lodge of Scotland from 1979 to 1983.

== Life ==
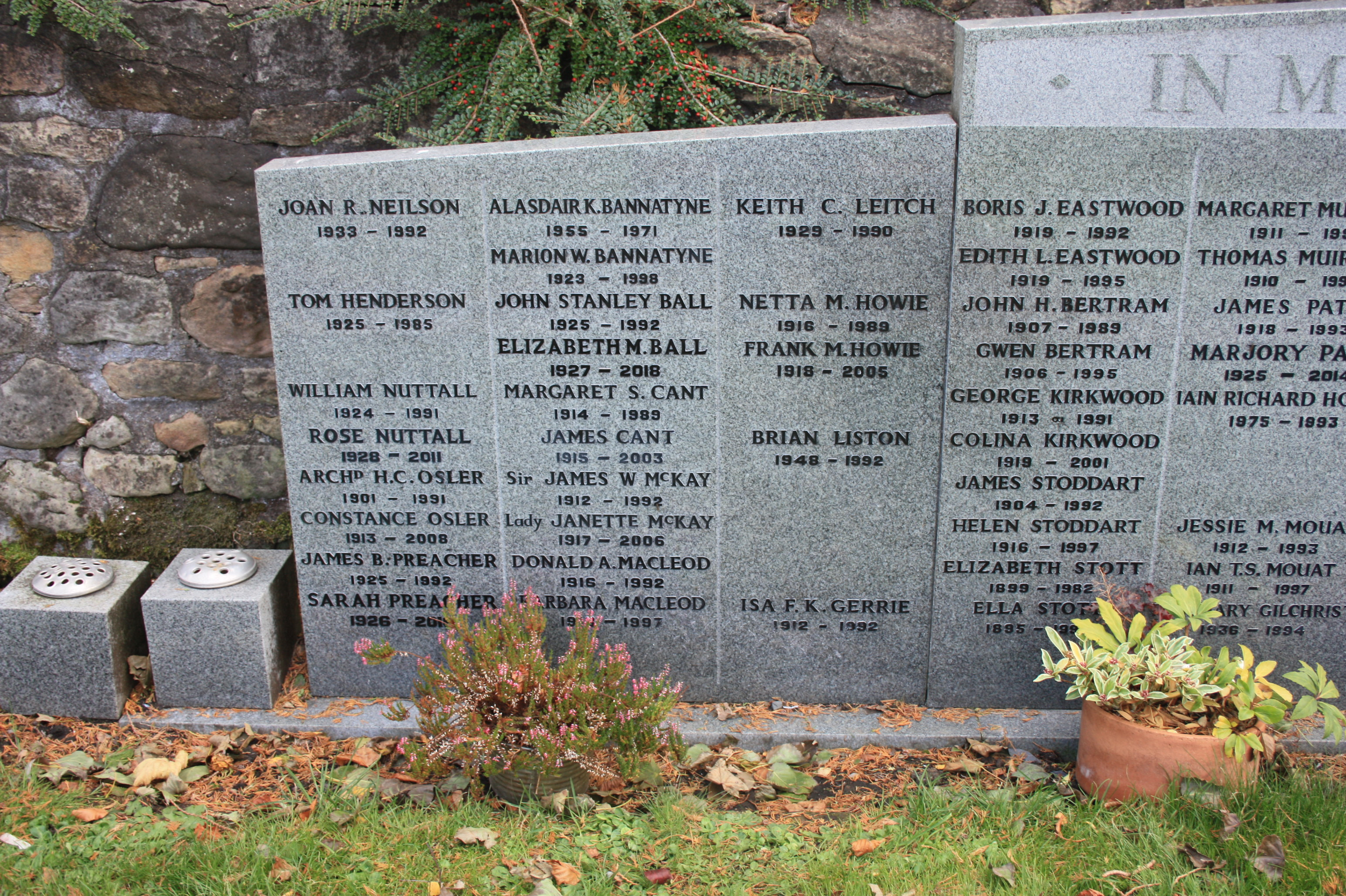
Memorial to James Wilson McKay (central inscription), Cramond Parish Churchyard

McKay was born in 1912 in Bo'ness, the son of John McKay, an insurance superintendent, and Alice Easton Wilson McKay. He was educated at Dunfermline High School in Dunfermline, Fife.

McKay was appointed a Knight Bachelor in the 1971 Birthday Honours and knighted by Elizabeth II on 16 November 1971 at Buckingham Palace by Queen Elizabeth II. He also received an Honorary Doctorate from Heriot-Watt University in 1971.

From 1979 to 1983 he was Grand Master Mason of Scotland, the head of Scottish freemasonry.

He died in Edinburgh on 25 May 1992. He was cremated and his ashes are buried against the south wall of Cramond Parish Church in north-west Edinburgh.

== Artistic recognition ==
He was portrayed in office by David Abercrombie Donaldson.

== Family ==
He was married to Janette (1917-2006), later Lady McKay.

Academic offices
Preceded by Sir Herbert Brechin	Lord Provost of Edinburgh; 1969–1972	Succeeded by Jack Kane
Masonic offices
Preceded by Robert Wolrige Gordon	Grand Master of the Grand Lodge of Scotland; 1979–1983	Succeeded by J. M. Marcus Humphrey
