= William Fraser (British Army officer) =

British Army officer (1890–1964)

Brigadier The Honourable William Fraser DSO MC
- Born: 5 July 1890
- Died: 11 November 1964 (aged 74); Aldeburgh, Suffolk, England
- Relatives: Alexander Fraser, 19th Lord Saltoun (father); Sir David Fraser (son)
- Military career
- Allegiance: United Kingdom
- Branch: British Army
- Service years: 1910–1944
- Rank: Brigadier
- Service number: 20008
- Units: Gordon Highlanders; Grenadier Guards
- Commands: 228th Infantry Brigade (1942–1943); 8th Infantry Brigade (1941–1942); 24th Guards Brigade (1940–1941); 27th Infantry Brigade (1940); 1st Battalion, Grenadier Guards (1937–1938); 1/6th Battalion, Gordon Highlanders (1917–1918)
- Conflicts: First World War; Second World War
- Awards: Distinguished Service Order; Military Cross; Mentioned in Despatches (3)
- Other work: Chief of the United Nations Relief and Rehabilitation Administration in Paris

Brigadier William Fraser, DSO, MC (5 July 1890 – 11 November 1964) was a younger son of Alexander Fraser, 19th Lord Saltoun and served as a British Army officer in both world wars.

== Early life ==
William Fraser was born on 5 July 1890, the youngest of four sons of Alexander Fraser, 19th Lord Saltoun of Abernethy, a Scottish peerage created in 1445. As the son of a peer, William took the courtesy style 'The Honourable'. He was educated at Charterhouse School and at the Royal Military College, Sandhurst.

== First World War ==
Fraser was commissioned into the Gordon Highlanders as a second lieutenant in July 1910 and served with the 2nd Battalion in India and Egypt.

When the First World War broke out, the battalion sailed for England, and landed at Zeebrugge in Belgium on 7 October 1914, with Fraser as Battalion Machine Gun Officer. It was soon in action at the First Battle of Ypres. During particularly heavy fighting in front of Gheluvelt on 28–29 October, Fraser was wounded. His elder brother, the Hon Simon Fraser, who had only been commissioned on 1 August from the 3rd (Special Reserve) Battalion, Gordon Highlanders, was killed in the same action.

After recovering from his wound, William Fraser was promoted to captain in March 1915 and served as a staff captain at 27th Infantry Brigade in 9th (Scottish) Division from November 1915 to April 1916, when he became brigade major of 151st (Durham Light Infantry) Brigade in the 50th (Northumbrian) Division.

In May 1917 Fraser was appointed acting lieutenant-colonel to command 1/6th Gordon Highlanders, a Territorial Force battalion serving in the 51st (Highland) Division. The battalion saw heavy fighting during the Third Ypres offensive that summer, and at Cambrai in the autumn. In February 1918, Fraser was sent to command a corps school of instruction.

== Between the wars ==
By the end of the war Fraser was a temporary lieutenant-colonel, with a Distinguished Service Order, a Military Cross, and three Mentions in Despatches, on 1 January 1918, but on the return of peace he reverted to the substantive rank of captain, serving on the staff at Sandhurst. He was promoted to brevet major in December 1919. In the 1920s he served as adjutant of his battalion, and as brigade major in Eastern Command. He attended the Staff College, Camberley as a student from January 1921. In 1929 he transferred to the Grenadier Guards. From 1931 to 1935 he was British military attaché at Brussels and The Hague. He finally attained the substantive rank of lieutenant-colonel on 1 July 1937 (20 years after he had first held it), and was immediately promoted to brevet colonel. He commanded the 1st Battalion, Grenadier Guards for a year, until he was sent to Paris as British military attaché, where he was serving when the Second World War broke out in September 1939.

== Second World War ==
In early January 1940 he took command of the 27th Infantry Brigade, part of the 9th (Highland) Infantry Division, a second-line Territorial Army (TA) formation. He was not there for long, however, as in mid-February Fraser was appointed to command the newly created 24th Infantry Brigade (Guards), organising for the proposed intervention in Norway. Eventually, after much changing of plans, the brigade set out in early April as the first echelon of 'Avonforce', under Major General Pierse Joseph Mackesy, to recapture the port of Narvik from the German invaders. Mackesy and two companies of Scots Guards from Fraser's brigade arrived on 14 April, the day after the conclusion of the Battles of Narvik that had destroyed German naval forces in the area. The whole brigade was concentrated at Harstad, 35 miles from Narvik, by 16 April. Operations were made difficult by fresh snow, but Avonforce began working forwards. On 30 April, while making a personal reconnaissance towards Ankenesstranda, Fraser was slightly wounded and had to hand command over to his senior battalion commander.

By the time Fraser resumed command of his brigade on 14 May, the situation had changed, and attention was directed to the area of Mo, to prevent German reinforcements advancing from the south. Mackesy put Fraser in command of all British troops at Mo, and he travelled down the coast to view the situation there. He formed the opinion that the position was untenable because of German air superiority. However, the following day, while travelling back from Mo to Harstadt aboard HMS Somali, the destroyer was damaged by enemy bombing and had to return to the United Kingdom for repairs, taking Fraser with her. He did not reach Harstadt until 23 May, where he was pronounced unfit for service due to his April wound, and he was invalided back to Britain. Brigadier Colin Gubbins took command of the brigade for the remainder of the Norway operations. Fraser was able to resume command on 17 June, after the brigade had been evacuated from Norway.

The 24th Brigade was now an independent brigade group forming part of the London District defences, with its own artillery and supporting arms. Fraser continued in command until 19 February 1941, when he handed over to Brigadier Frederick Browning. Then he was appointed from 26 June 1941 to command the 8th Infantry Brigade, succeeding Brigadier George Symes. The brigade formed part of the 3rd Infantry Division, then commanded by Major General James Gammell (succeeded in November by Major General Eric Hayes).

Fraser ceased to command the 8th Brigade on 3 March 1942. On 12 October that year he took command of a new 228th Independent Infantry Brigade, created to command the defences of the Shetland Islands. This brigade was disbanded on 16 September 1943, and Fraser does not appear to have been employed thereafter. In 1944 he retired with the honorary rank of brigadier. From 1945 to 1947 he was chief of the United Nations Relief and Rehabilitation Administration mission in Paris, delivering food and medical aid and dealing with displaced persons.

== Family life ==
Fraser married Pamela Cynthia Maude, second daughter of the actor-managers Cyril Maude and Winifred Emery, on 22 December 1919. Born in 1893, she was the widow of Major William "Billy" Congreve, whom she had married on 1 June 1916, just weeks before his death in action, leaving her with a posthumous daughter, Mary Gloria Congreve, born 21 March 1917. She and Fraser had two sons:

- General Sir David Fraser, Grenadier Guards, born 30 December 1920, died 15 July 2012.
- Alastair Grattan Maude Fraser, born 3 March 1926, died 7 May 1932.

Fraser died on 11 November 1964, and his funeral took place at Aldeburgh on 16 November.

== Sources ==
- Burke's Peerage, Baronetage and Knightage, London: Burke's Peerage, various edns.
- T.K. Derry, History of the Second World War: The Campaign in Norway, London: HM Stationery Office, 1952.
- Joslen, H. F. (2003) [1960]. Orders of Battle: Second World War, 1939–1945. Uckfield, East Sussex: Naval and Military Press. ISBN 978-1-84342-474-1.
