= Dudley-Williams baronets =

Baronetcy in the Baronetage of the United Kingdom

The Dudley-Williams Baronetcy, of the city and of the county of the city of Exeter, is a title in the Baronetage of the United Kingdom. It was created on 2 July 1964 for the aeronautical engineer and Conservative politician Sir Rolf Dudley-Williams. On receiving the baronetcy, on 29 June 1964 Williams changed his surname to Dudley-Williams by deed poll. As of 2010 the title is held by his son, the 2nd Baronet, who succeeded in 1987.

Journalist Marina Hyde is the daughter of the 2nd Baronet.

== Dudley-Williams baronets, of Exeter (1964) ==
- Sir Rolf Dudley Dudley-Williams, 1st Baronet (1908–1987)
- Sir Alastair Edgcumbe James Dudley-Williams, 2nd Baronet (born 1943)

The heir presumptive is the present holder's brother Malcolm Dudley-Williams (born 1947). The heir presumptive's heir apparent is his son Nicholas Mark Edgcumbe Dudley-Williams (born 1975).

Coat of arms of Dudley-Williams baronets

Crest
In front of a castle as in the arms a wild cat rampant guardant Proper.
Escutcheon
Gules a chevron engrailed plain cotised between in chief two cranes respectant Proper and in base a triangular castle of three towers Or.
Motto
Cave Felem
