= 228th Brigade =

228th Brigade may refer to:

- 228th Mixed Brigade, Spain
- 228th Brigade, Royal Field Artillery
- 228th Infantry Brigade (United Kingdom)
- 228th Theater Tactical Signal Brigade, United States

== See also ==
- 228th Regiment (disambiguation)
- 228th (disambiguation)
