= Isington =

Village in Hampshire, England

Coordinates: 51.1772°N 0.8931°W

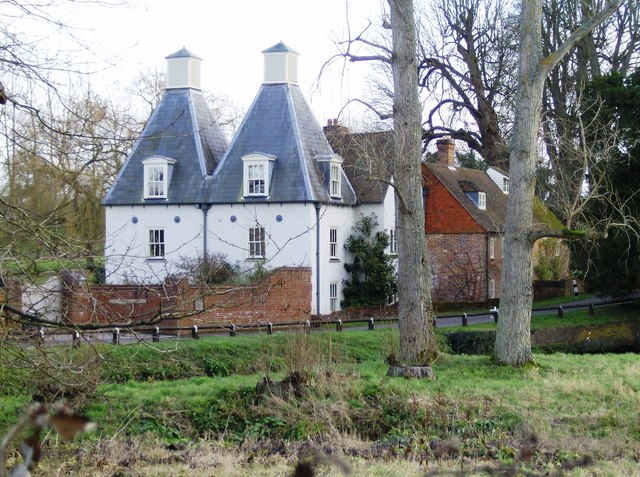
- Isington Mill

- Location within Hampshire
- OS grid reference: SU774425
- Civil parish: Binsted
- District: East Hampshire
- Shire county: Hampshire
- Region: South East
- Country: England
- Sovereign state: United Kingdom
- Post town: Alton
- Postcode district: GU34
- Police: Hampshire and Isle of Wight
- Fire: Hampshire and Isle of Wight
- Ambulance: South Central

Isington is a hamlet in the East Hampshire district of Hampshire, England. It lies just south of the A31 road, a mile (1.6 km) southwest of the village of Bentley and four miles (6.4 km) northeast of the market town of Alton. At the 2011 Census the Post Office confirm that the population was included in the civil parish of Binsted.

The nearest railway station is Bentley, 1.1 miles (1.8 km) east of the hamlet.

Isington Mill was the home of Field Marshal The 1st Viscount Montgomery of Alamein.
