= Binsted =

Village and parish in Hampshire, England

Coordinates: 51.164°N 0.899°W

- Civil parish
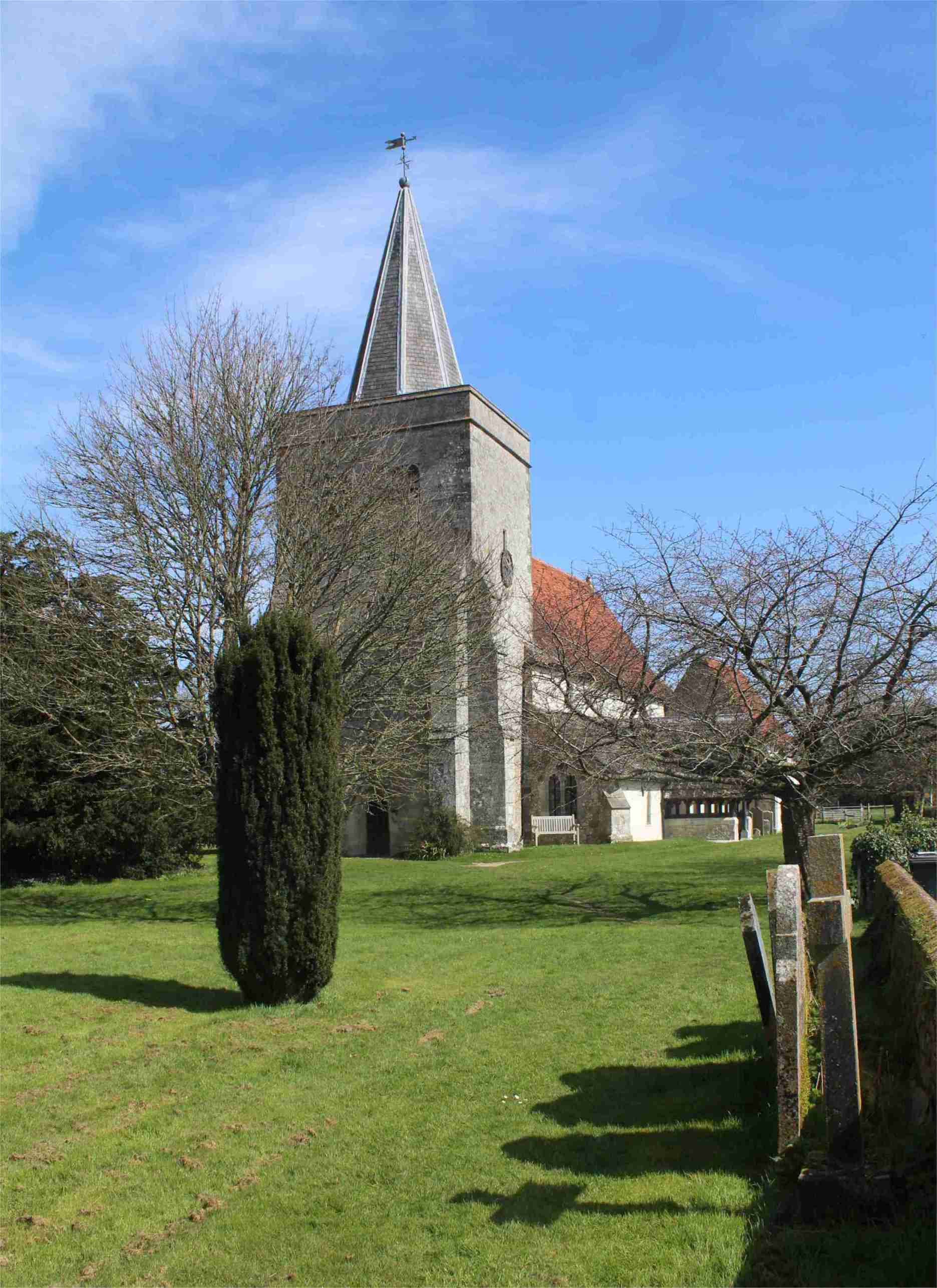
- Binsted Church from the West

- Location within Hampshire
- Population: 1,926 (2021 census)
- OS grid reference: SU771411
- District: East Hampshire
- Shire county: Hampshire
- Region: South East
- Country: England
- Sovereign state: United Kingdom
- Post town: Alton
- Postcode district: GU34
- Police: Hampshire and Isle of Wight
- Fire: Hampshire and Isle of Wight
- Ambulance: South Central
- UK Parliament: East Hampshire

Binsted is a village and civil parish in East Hampshire, England. It is about 4.1 miles (6.6 km) east of Alton, its nearest town. The parish is one of the largest in northern Hampshire and covers almost 7,000 acres (2,800 ha). It contains two villages, Bucks Horn Oak and Holt Pound, as well as the hamlets, South Hay, Wyck and Wheatley. The parish also covers the entirety of the Alice Holt Forest, a royal forest situated near the border with Surrey. The nearest railway station is Bentley, 1.8 miles (2.9 km) northeast of the village. According to the 2021 census, the parish had a population of 1,926 people.

The village was first mentioned as being part of the Hundred of Netham at the time of the Domesday Survey in 1086. The history of Binsted from the 11th to 19th centuries is not documented, owing to its isolation and non-involvement in controversial activity. The parish has 58 grade II listed buildings, and one grade I building – the Church of the Holy Cross.

== History ==
At the time of the Domesday Survey, Binsted was listed as part of the Hundred of Netham as well as the Manor of Alton Westbrook. The village was referred to as "Benested", which means "holding of land". Over the years there have been different variations on the spelling of the name, including Bensted, Benested and Boonsted (11th century), Bensted (14th century), and Bennsted (17th century). The name most likely has its origin from the Saxon word bin, meaning "heap". (Note: The Saxon word most likely alluded to a "mound" marking a battle.) Before the Norman Conquest, the village was known as "Binsted Popham" and was held by Egbert of Wessex.

The history of Binsted from the 11th century to the early 19th century is not documented. A likely explanation is that the village remained a "simple agricultural community" and was not involved in any controversial activity, due to its isolation. However, the Alice Holt Forest was an important supplier of timber from the 12th and 18th centuries, and the forest was claimed to have 13,000 trees "fit for ship building" in the early 17th century.

Binsted was recorded in the Imperial Gazetteer of England and Wales by John Marius Wilson in 1870. (Note: ... a parish and a subdistrict in the district of Alton, Hants. The parish lies 2½ miles SSW of Bentley r. station, and 4 NE by E of Alton; contains the hamlets of Issington, Week, Westcote, and Wheatley; and has a post office under Alton. Acres, 6,833. Real property, £7,104. Pop., 1,195. Houses, 231. Binstead Hill is the seat of the Coulthards. The living is a vicarage, united with the vicarage of Kingsley, in the diocese of Winchester. Value, not reported.* Patrons, the Dean and Chapter of Winchester. The church is ancient, has a low embattled tower and a spire, and contains several monuments. There is a Primitive Methodist chapel.-The subdistrict comprises eight parishes and an extra-parochial tract. Acres, 27,482. Pop., 4,806. Houses, 980.) Five years later a school was built on land belonging to the Wickham Estate from stones brought from a pit near Semaphore House.

== Geography ==
Binsted is located in the eastern central part of Hampshire, South East England and is 4.1 miles (6.6 km) east of Alton, its nearest town. The parish is one of the largest in north-east Hampshire and covers an area of around 7,000 acres (2,800 ha), extending from the edge of Alton to the Surrey border in the east. It also includes the entirety of the Alice Holt Forest. The landscape is dominated by farms and woodland such as Binsted Farm, Wheatley Copse and Sparkfield Wood. The parish contains the hamlets Wyck, Wheatley, and South Hay, and two villages; Bucks Horn Oak and Holt Pound. The River Wey forms the parish's northern boundary.

=== Climate ===
Due to its location in south central England and its proximity to the sea, the average maximum temperature in January is 7.2 °C (45 °F) with the average minimum being 1.6 °C (35 °F). The average maximum temperature in July is 21.9 °C (71 °F), with the average minimum being 12.5 °C (55 °F). The hamlet gets around 755 millimetres (29.7 in) of rain a year, with a minimum of 1 mm (0.04 in) of rain reported on 103 days a year.

Climate data for Odiham weather station (nearest to Binsted), Odiham, elevation: 9 metres (30 feet) (1981–2010)
Month	Jan	Feb	Mar	Apr	May	Jun	Jul	Aug	Sep	Oct	Nov	Dec	Year
Mean daily maximum °C (°F)	7.2 (45.0)	7.4 (45.3)	10.3 (50.5)	13.0 (55.4)	16.6 (61.9)	19.5 (67.1)	21.9 (71.4)	21.6 (70.9)	18.5 (65.3)	14.4 (57.9)	10.3 (50.5)	7.4 (45.3)	14.1 (57.4)
Mean daily minimum °C (°F)	1.6 (34.9)	1.3 (34.3)	3.0 (37.4)	4.4 (39.9)	7.5 (45.5)	10.4 (50.7)	12.5 (54.5)	12.4 (54.3)	10.2 (50.4)	7.4 (45.3)	4.2 (39.6)	1.8 (35.2)	6.4 (43.5)
Average precipitation mm (inches)	77.8 (3.06)	56.0 (2.20)	54.8 (2.16)	52.6 (2.07)	52.2 (2.06)	48.5 (1.91)	50.2 (1.98)	52.1 (2.05)	61.8 (2.43)	87.2 (3.43)	83.9 (3.30)	78.5 (3.09)	755.5 (29.74)
Average precipitation days	12.2	9.8	10.5	9.5	9.5	8.6	8.4	8.6	8.9	11.7	11.7	11.5	120.9
Source: Met Office

== Demographics ==
According to the 2011 census, the parish of Binsted had a population of 1,817 people. In addition, there are 711 households in the parish with an average size of 2.56 people.

Census population of Binsted parish
Census	Population	Female	Male	Households	Source
2001	1,635	819	816	651	
2011	1,817	929	888	711	
2021	1,926	986	940	760	

== Binsted Church ==
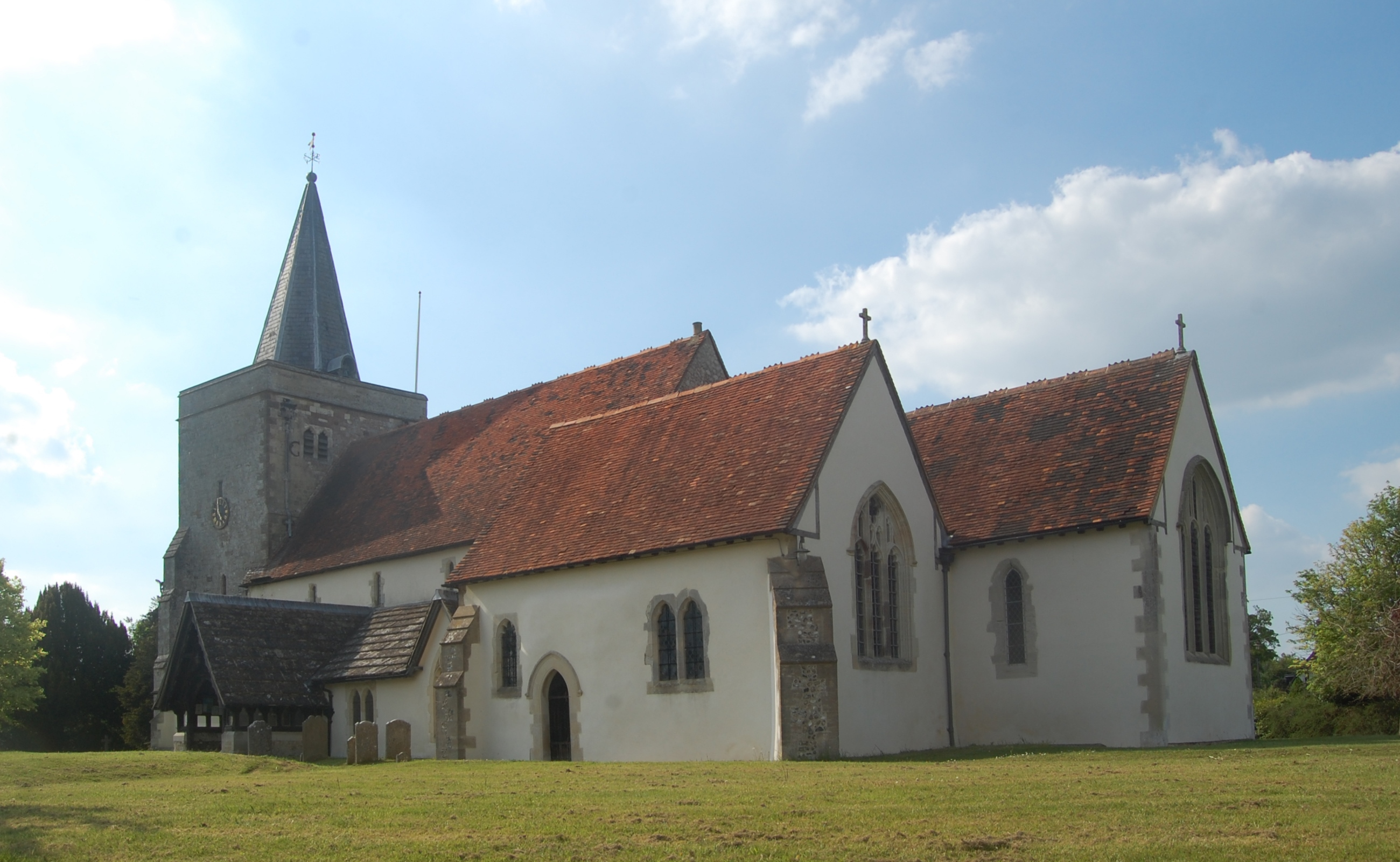
Church of the Holy Cross viewed from the east side

The Church of the Holy Cross is a grade I listed building. The existing parish church started construction in about 1140 AD. It has early 13th and 15th century additions, as well as a substantial restoration in 1863. The building itself consists of stone walls, a tiled roof, and a stone slated porch. The oldest part is the chancel, which dates from the 12th century with 15th century extensions. The north chapel was altered in 1331.

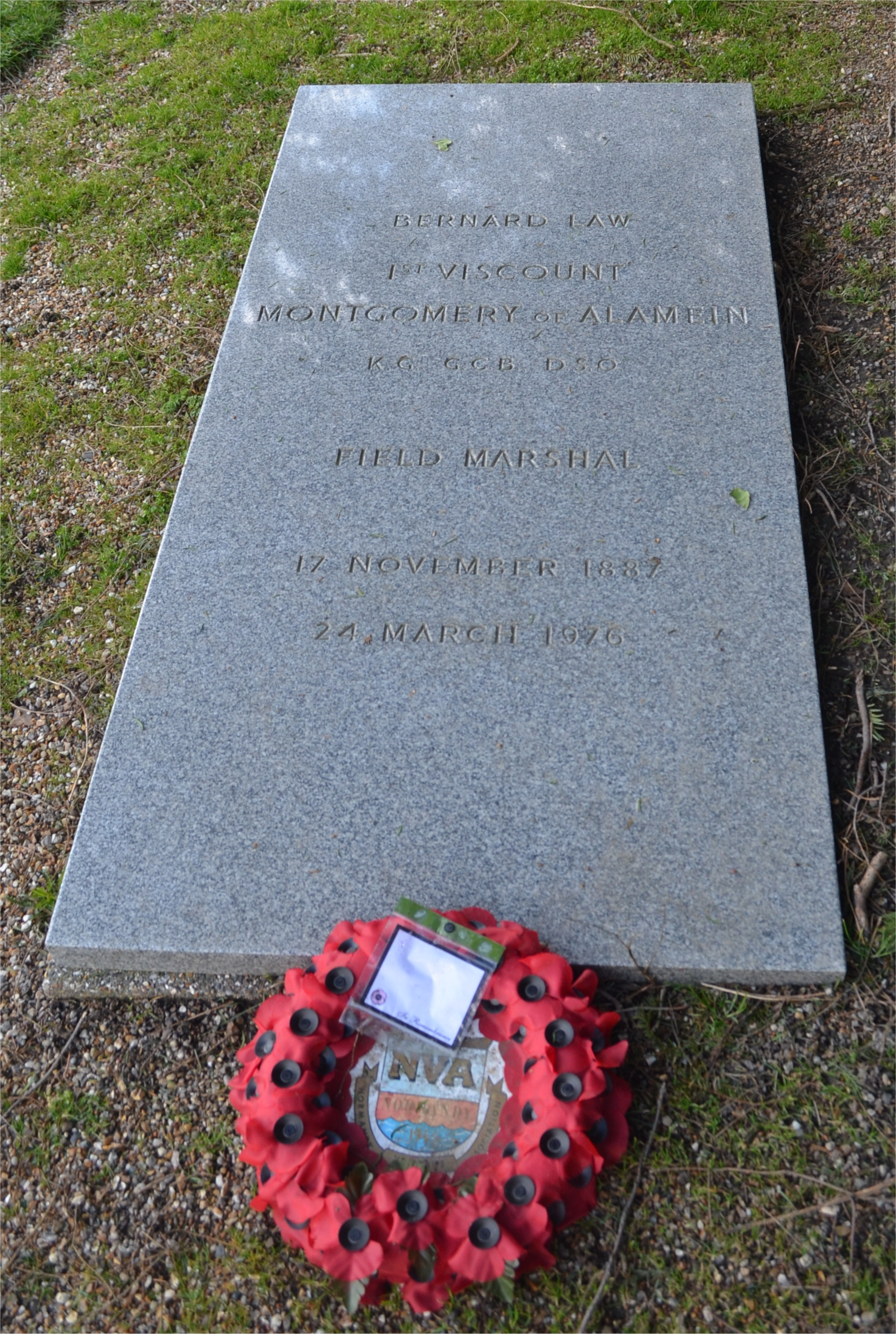
Montgomery's grave, Holy Cross churchyard, Binsted

In the churchyard is the grave of Field Marshal Montgomery, the famous military commander in the Second World War. After the war he lived in the parish at Isington Mill, a few miles north of Binstead village

The churchyard also contains the Commonwealth war graves of six British Army soldiers of World War I (all in the north west corner) and a Royal Air Force airman of World War II (in south west corner).

The west tower contains a ring of six bells, among the finest in Hampshire. These bells were cast at Loughborough Bell Foundry, by the world renowned firm John Taylor & Co in 1958, replacing an earlier ring of bells. The 'tenor' bell weighs 665 kg (12cwt-3qr-17 lbs) and is tuned to F#.

== Notable landmarks ==
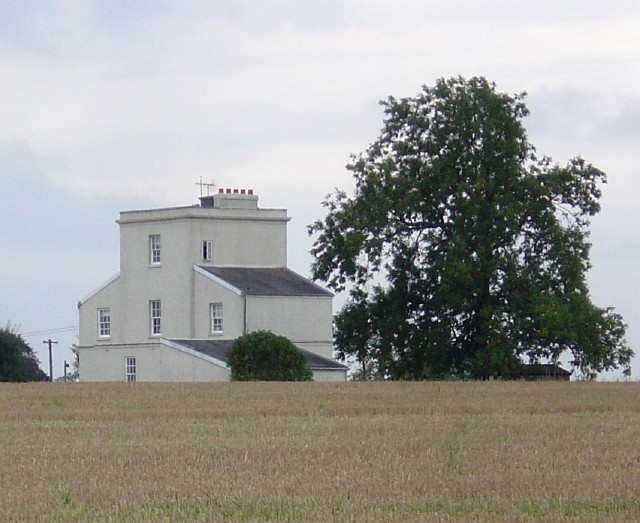
Telegraph House

The parish contains a total of 58 grade II listed buildings, including a grade II* listed barn. Other listed buildings include Barnfield House – three houses which were once separated all dating from 1550 with 20th century restorations. The house itself has a timber frame with a tiled roof, including a late medieval hall. Mill Court, another grade II listed building, is a large house dating from the early 19th century with a low pitched roof and yellow brickwork, and became a listed building on 15 August 1985.

Telegraph House was built on the hill NE of the village by the Admiralty in 1825 as a semaphore relay station close to the railway line linking London with Portsmouth, one of a number of relay stations. It is now a private residence.
