= Rowledge =

Village and parish in Surrey, England

Coordinates: 51.1822°N 0.8241°W

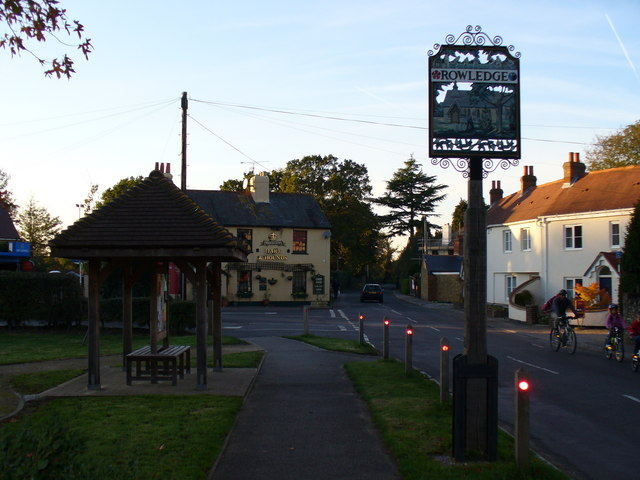
- The Square, including village sign

- Location within Surrey
- Population: 1,578 (2001)
- OS grid reference: SU822432
- District: Waverley
- Shire county: Surrey
- Region: South East
- Country: England
- Sovereign state: United Kingdom
- Post town: Farnham
- Postcode district: GU10
- Dialling code: 01252
- Police: Surrey
- Fire: Surrey
- Ambulance: South East Coast
- UK Parliament: Farnham and Bordon

Rowledge is a village in England on the Surrey–Hampshire border, centred south of the A31 and Farnham. Neighbouring villages include Wrecclesham and Frensham. To the south west of the village is the Alice Holt Forest; to the west is Birdworld. It is in the Waverley Ward of Farnham, Wrecclesham and Rowledge.

== Geography ==
Rowledge is centred in a southwest corner of Surrey, 3 miles (4.8 km) south west of the town of Farnham.

The relatively late (19th-century-created) ecclesiastical parish of Rowledge remains, unusually, one which straddles the Hampshire border: St James' Church, a few homes and Rowledge Primary School are in Hampshire. This two-county arrangement, which in respect of the same land applied to the largest contributor, Frensham, is unusual. It was formed in 1869 from parts of Farnham, Frensham and a very small percentage of Binsted parishes and includes the hamlets of Holt Pound and Bucks Horn Oak in Hampshire.

Rowledge had a civil parish, covering the area within Surrey, now forms part of the Waverley ward of Wrecclesham and Rowledge. The area of Frensham after marginal falls, fell from 8,807 acres (3,564 ha) within the 10 years before 1901 to 7,656 and fell during the 20 years before 1951 to 5,204 acres (2,106 ha), with its westerly hamlets gaining new local administration accordingly.

The village is bounded to the north by the Bourne Valley (an "Area of Strategic Visual Importance" or ASVI) and Wrecclesham and Boundstone/Upper Bourne; to the west by the Alice Holt Forest; to the east by open countryside and to the south by further open countryside (an "Area of Great Landscape Value" or AGLV).

== History ==
The area was from the Norman Conquest agricultural manorial, common land and land not suited for cultivation termed waste: it included large farms and scattered cottages. In the West End part to the south and in the Hampshire mostly forested part 19th century replacements of some of these exist. In the 1841 Census, there were only about 50 dwellings and 250 inhabitants within the boundaries of what is now known as Rowledge. Evidence on the ground is thin: no listed building is in the parish on the National Heritage list. Fir Grove House, later rebuilt as Frensham Heights by Charles Charrington, the brewer, and now a private school is in the southern part of the parish. A rather haphazard pattern of trackways and footpaths traversed the area which still exist today and formed the basis for the present-day road network.

The coming of the railways to Farnham in 1848 and the development of Aldershot as the home of the British Army in 1854, resulted in an influx of wealthy businessmen and Army officers, and saw the construction of many large houses in the late Victorian era. Tradesmen and service providers established themselves. The area was important for hop growing, supporting the brewing industry in Farnham.

The Parish Church of St James' was built in 1869 and the School in 1872. The Methodist Church was established in 1875 and a new building erected in 1886. By 1871, a recognisable centre to the Village was established, with a post office, shops, public house and transport links to Farnham. A Rowledge cricket team did particularly well at the original Oval at Holt Pound so as to reach the village final at Lord's Cricket Ground.

Further development, particularly in the early 1900s, followed the established road network and gradually filled in the open fields, creating the present-day village.

In 1914 the Village Hall was built and the Recreation Ground became the centre for local cricket. Tennis and Bowls Clubs were established in the 1920s and 1930s. Another surge in development took place in the 1960s and 1970s, including Rowledge's first and only, housing estate in 1982.

== Demography ==
Surrey County Council estimated that the population of this part of the ward comprises 1,578 people living in 599 households (based on the United Kingdom Census 2001), 66.7% of properties were detached, 88.5% of homes were owner-occupied and 1.5% were socially rented, 29.0% of households had dependent children and 59.3% of households had two or more cars/vans.

== Amenities and recreation ==
Rowledge's community includes its own small shopping area with a butcher, convenience store (containing a post office), cafe, hairdresser and garage, and a public house: The Hare & Hounds.

Local societies, sports and social activities include the school's activities, Village Hall, St. James' Church, Methodist Church Hall, Rowledge Club and the Recreation Ground with a newly refurbished play-area.

The village holds Rowledge Village Fayre annually on Spring Bank Holiday Monday at the Recreation Ground. Rowledge Village Fayre has a large number of attractions and raises a significant sum of money for charities.

== Community events and awards ==
There is a Village Hall used by a play-group and other groups for children. Adults are catered for with various activities. At weekends the Hall is hired for parties and celebrations. Meetings with neighbourhood police, Councillors and the MP take place there.

Rowledge won the Community category in the Fullers Surrey Village of the Year Competition in 2010 and narrowly missed (by 1 point) the award.
