= Margery Maude =

English-American actress

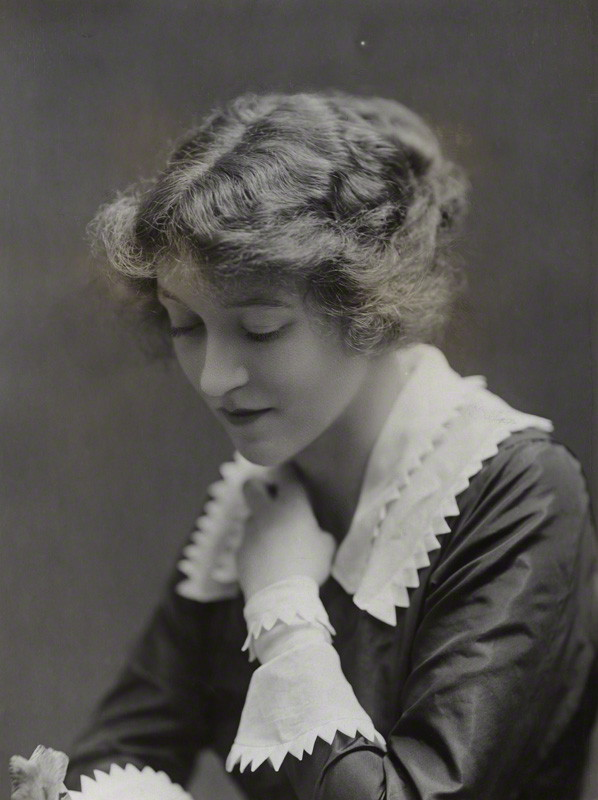
- Maude in 1916
- Born: Margery Kathleen Maude; 29 April 1889; Wimbledon, London, U.K.
- Died: 7 August 1979 (aged 90); Cleveland, Ohio, U.S.
- Occupation: Actress
- Years active: 1913–1965
- Spouse: Joseph Warren Burden (m. 1917)
- Children: 3

Margery Kathleen Maude (29 April 1889 – 7 August 1979) was an English actress of stage, screen and television.

== Early life ==
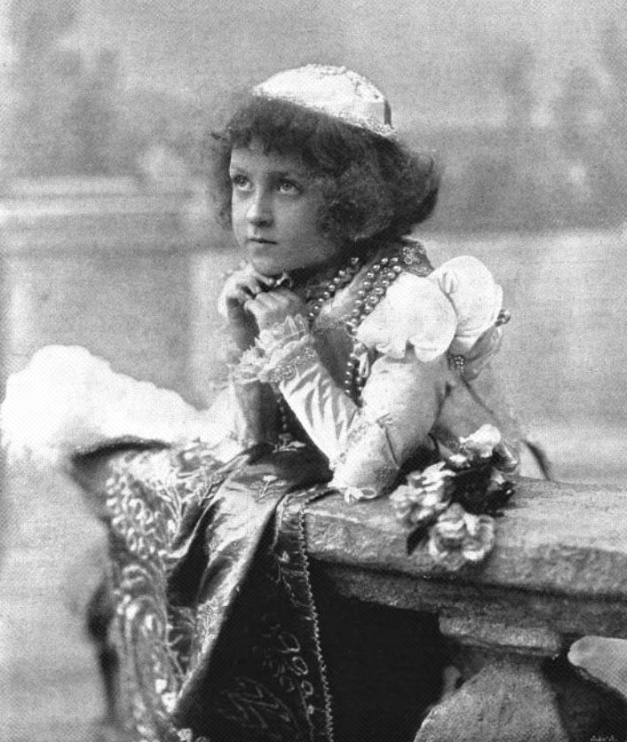
At the Mansion House children's fancy-dress ball in 1896

Margery Maude was born in Wimbledon, London, the elder daughter of the actors Cyril and Winifred (née Emery) Maude.

== Career ==
Maude appeared on Broadway between 1913 and 1965. She received the following commendation for her performance in a production of Rip van Winkle, opposite her father in the title role in 1911. Her mother also had a role in the play.

Miss Margery Maude played her part with peculiar sweetness. She is a charming little actress, dainty, earnest and unaffected. Miss Winifred Emery had only a small part, but a telling one. She gave a touching rendering of an old lady in whose soul the bitterness of time was powerless to destroy the sweetness, and many eyes were moist while she was on stage.

== Personal life ==
She married Joseph Warren Burden on 23 July 1917 in New York City; the couple had three children: Joseph Jr. (1918–1944), Winifred and Pamela.

== Death ==
Margery Maude died on 7 August 1979, at her home near Cleveland, Ohio, aged 90.

== Filmography ==
Year	Title	Role	Notes
1949	Kraft Television Theatre		2 episodes
1952	Hallmark Hall of Fame	Mrs. Russell Sage	Episode: "Constitution Island"
1954	The Colgate Comedy Hour	herself	1 episodes
1955	You're Never Too Young	Mrs. Ella Brennan	
1956	The Birds and the Bees	Mrs. Hamilton	
1957	Williamsburg: The Story of a Patriot	Madam Fry	Short
1964	The Defenders	Augusta Sloan	Episode: "The Man Who", (final appearance)
