= John Maude =

British barrister and politician

John Cyril Maude KC (3 April 1901 – 16 August 1986) was a British barrister and Conservative Party politician. He sat in the House of Commons from 1945 to 1951, and then became a judge.

== Early life ==
Maude was the son of the actors Cyril Maude and Winifred Emery. He was educated at Eton College and Christ Church, Oxford, and was called to the bar in 1925 at the Middle Temple. He wrote a memoir for private circulation entitled Memories of Eton and Oxford: the mountains and the sea (1936).

== Career ==
He was the Recorder of Devizes from 1939 to 1944, and of Plymouth from 1944 to 1954. He became a King's Counsel in 1943, and a bencher in 1951. He was Counsel to the Post Office at the Central Criminal Court from 1935 to 1942, and junior counsel to the Treasury from 1942 to 1942.

During the Second World War, he served as a temporary Civil Assistant at the War Office in 1939. In 1940 he joined the Military Intelligence Corps with the rank of Major, and worked in the offices of the War Cabinet in 1942.

He was elected at the 1945 general election as the Member of Parliament (MP) for Exeter. Having been selected as a candidate, he found that the election campaign clashed with his duties in a libel case at the High Court, but his application to postpone the cases was refused by Justice Cassels.

Maude prosecuted the case of Helen Duncan, the Spiritualist medium and the last person prosecuted under the Witchcraft Act 1735. Duncan was convicted. He also defended Daniel Raven who was accused of the murder of his in-laws. Raven was convicted and hanged.

Maude made his maiden speech in the Commons on 17 October 1945, in a debate on housing. He spoke of the overcrowding caused by the destruction of 1,800 of the city's houses during the Baedeker Blitz, and called for an end to the billeting of civil servants in private houses.

He voted in 1948 against the suspension of the death penalty, asserting that "the rope" and "the long drop" were feared terribly by criminals.

He was re-elected in 1950, doubling his majority despite adverse boundary changes. In April 1950, shortly after his re-election, he announced that he would stand down at the next election. He retired from Parliament at the general election in October 1951.

From 1954 to 1965 he was an additional judge at the City of London Court, and from 1965 to 1968 he was an additional judge at the Central Criminal Court.

He belonged to two private members' clubs: The Beefsteak Club and The Garrick Club. He was chairman of the Old Vic Trust from 1951 to 1954, and chairman of the British Drama League from 1952 to 1954.

== Personal life ==
Maude married twice, firstly in 1927 to Rosamund Murray of Boston, Massachusetts. They had one daughter named Anne. They divorced in 1955, and in the same year he married Maureen Buchanan, daughter of the Hon. Arthur Guinness and widow of the 4th Marquis of Dufferin and Ava.

Parliament of the United Kingdom
| Preceded by Arthur Conrad Reed | Member of Parliament for Exeter; 1945 – 1951 | Succeeded by Rolf Dudley-Williams |
