= Birdworld =

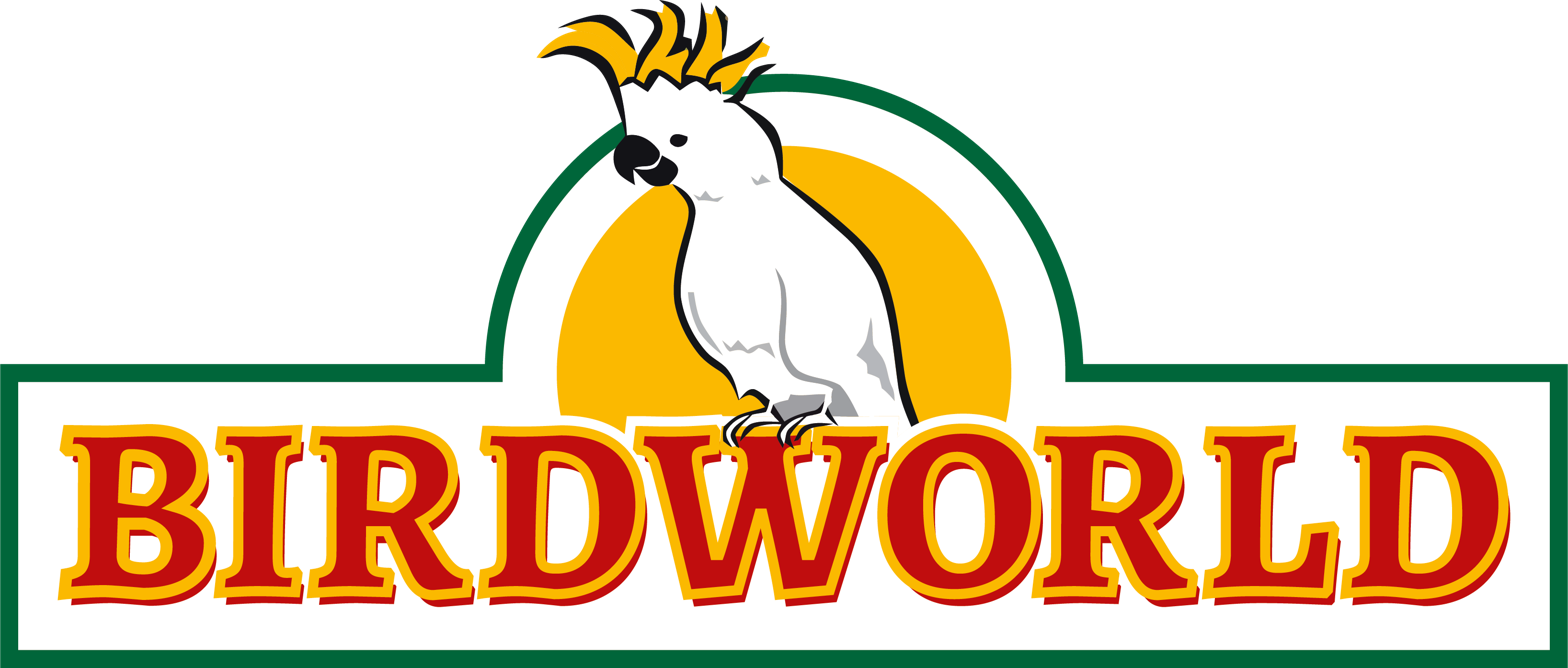

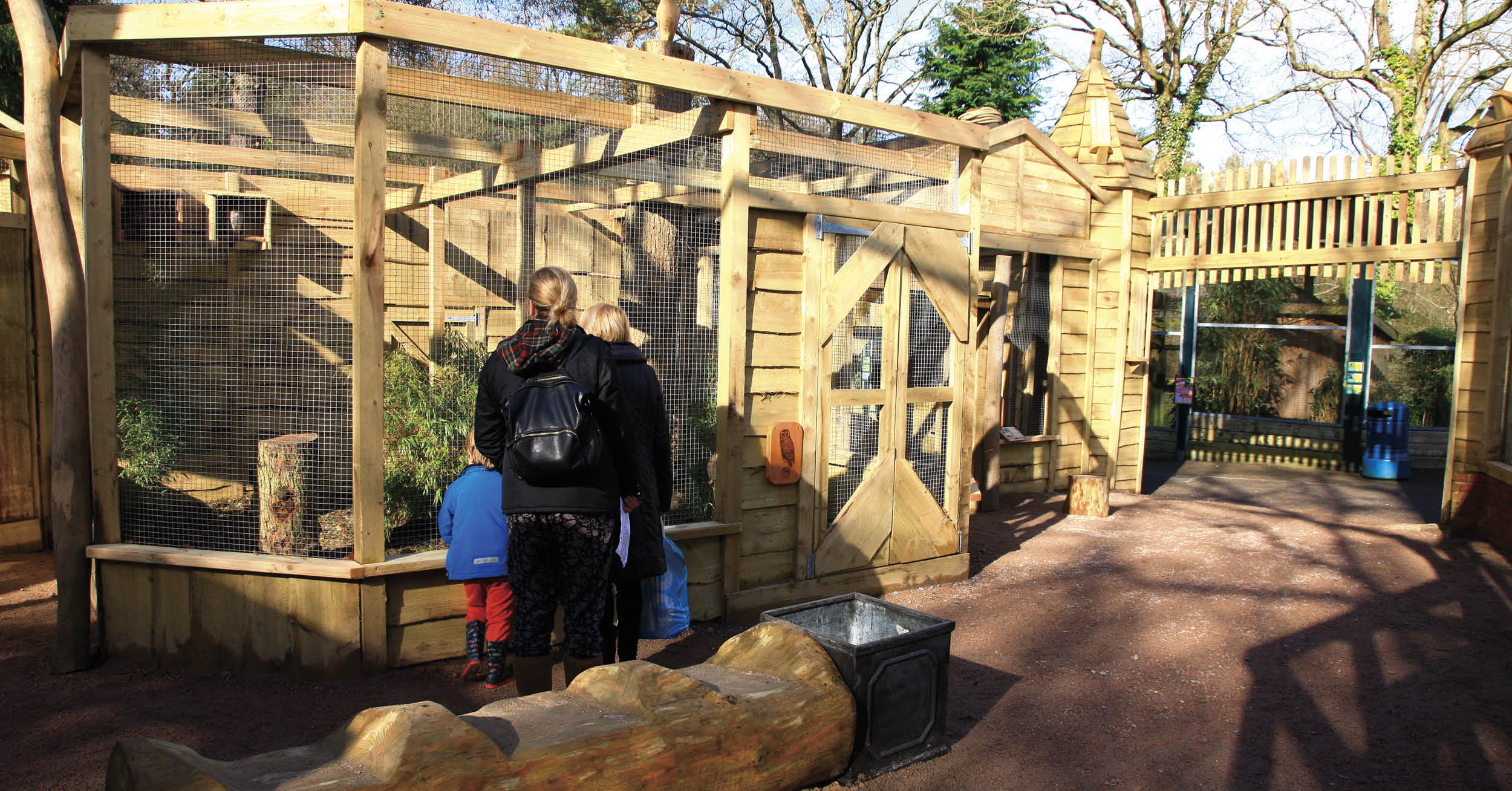
- The Terry Pratchett Owl Parliament at Birdworld
- Interactive map of Birdworld
- 51.1828°N 0.8407°W
- Date opened: 1968
- Location: Bucks Horn Oak, Hampshire
- Land area: 26 acres
- No. of animals: 1000 (birds and other animals)
- No. of species: 200 (birds and other animals)
- Memberships: BIAZA
- Major exhibits: Terry Pratchett Owl Parliament, Seashore Walk, Penguin Beach, Silent Forest, Penguin Island, Parrots in Flight, Jenny Wren Farm (formerly)
- Website: www.birdworld.co.uk

Birdworld is the United Kingdom's largest bird park, covering 26 acres (11 ha). It is located in the East Hampshire district, close to the village of Bucks Horn Oak and the surrounding Alice Holt Forest. It is part of the parent company Haskins Garden Centre Ltd., which also owns the nearby Forest Lodge garden centre and Garden Style, a wholesale plant seller.

== Birds ==
There are more than 180 different species of bird within the collection, 40 of which are listed as vulnerable, threatened or endangered on the IUCN Red List. These include the Bali starling, Montserrat oriole, northern bald ibis and the Kea.

Exhibits include a flock of great white pelicans, one of the largest free-flying parrot aviaries in the country, two penguin colonies, a seashore-themed aviary, and the Terry Pratchett Owl Parliament, which pays tribute to Discworld author Terry Pratchett.

== Other exhibits ==
There is also a group of Hermann's tortoises in the park, and several wild grey herons that are attracted by the fish fed to the Humboldt penguins and Great white pelicans.

The Jenny Wren Farm (1990-2024) was a children's petting zoo, and housed a number of farm animals, including the Whitefaced Woodland, a breed of sheep listed as vulnerable by the Rare Breeds Survival Trust.

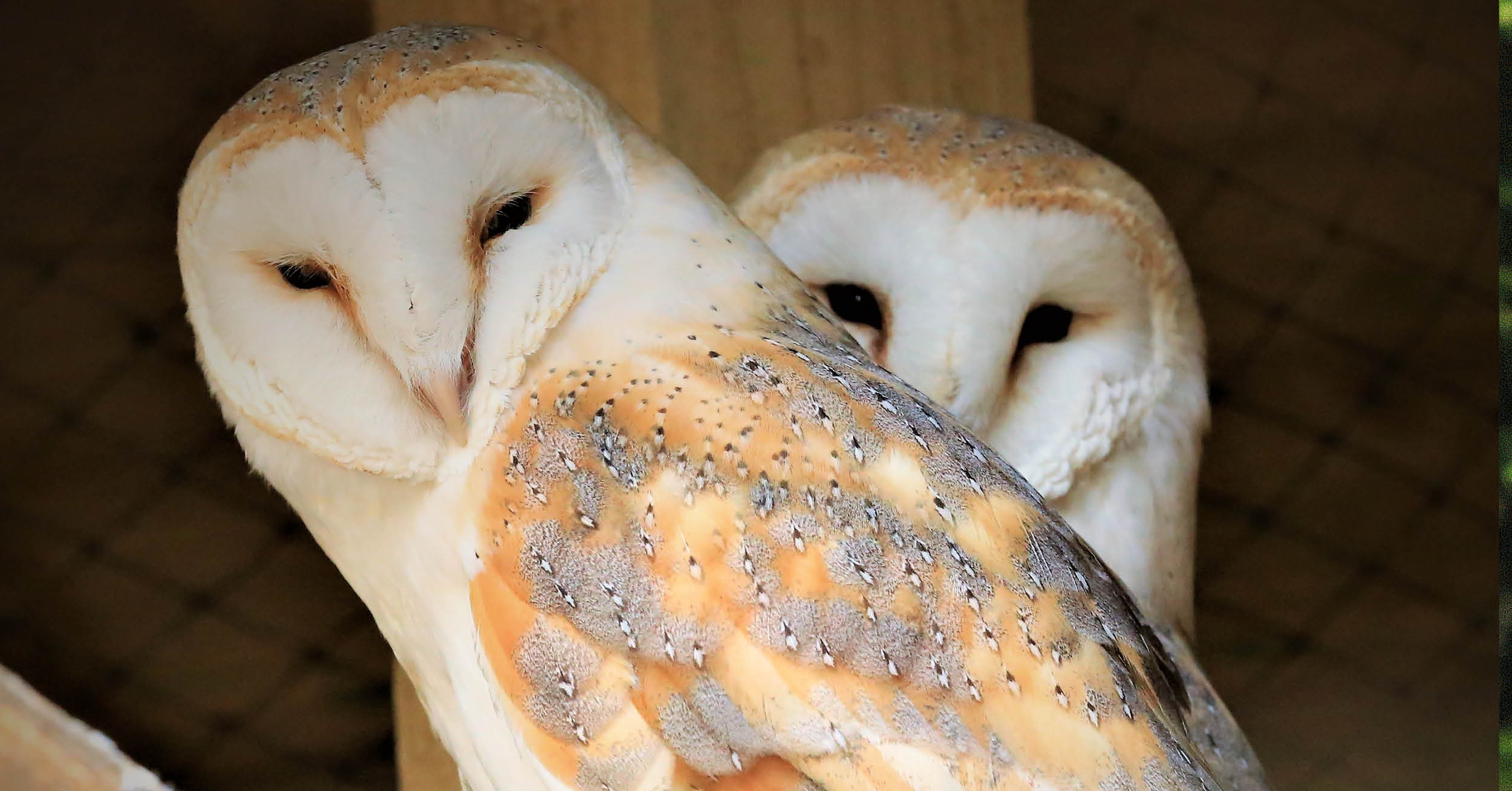
A pair of Barn Owls at Birdworld
