= Anne Balfour-Fraser =

British film producer

Anne Balfour-Fraser (10 August 1923 – 26 July 2016) was a British film producer who specialised in documentaries.

== Early life ==
Born Anne Balfour in Woking, Surrey, Balfour-Fraser's grandfather was Conservative politician Gerald Balfour, eventual Earl of Balfour, and her great-uncle Conservative Prime Minister Arthur Balfour. Her grandmother Betty Balfour (Bulwer-Lytton) and great-aunt Lady Constance Bulwer-Lytton were prominent suffragists, with Lytton going to prison several times for her activism.

Balfour-Fraser grew up at her family's home, Balbirnie, near Markinch, Fife, and studied at St Leonards school, St Andrews.

== Career ==
=== World War II ===
During the second world war, Balfour-Fraser worked in a factory laboratory analyzing aluminum to repair aircraft. Balfour-Fraser's mother, Ruth Balfour, had been one of the first women to study at Cambridge and had worked as a doctor during World War II.

=== Music ===
As a child, Balfour-Fraser learned the flute, then studied singing at the Royal Academy of Music, London, eventually performing at La Scala in Milan.

=== Film ===
Balfour-Fraser formed a film production company called Inca, shortened form of Independent Cine Art.

She earned Academy Award and BAFTA nominations for the films she produced.
