= 228th Infantry Regiment =

- Active: 1947–1954
- Country: United States
- Allegiance: Illinois
- Branch: Illinois Army National Guard
- Type: Infantry
- Mottos: De Fact Ducimus - Naturally, we lead.

Commanders
- Notable commanders: COL Otto L. McBride

The 228th Infantry Regiment was an infantry regiment of the United States Army, Illinois Army National Guard. It existed as a part of the 33rd Infantry Division from 1947 to 1954, during the early Cold War and Korean War. The regiment's most notable commander was Colonel Otto L. McBride, who commanded for almost the entirety of the regiment's brief existence. The 228th was made up of recruits from West Side, Chicago, and the western and northwestern parts of the Chicago area, and trained often at Camp Grayling. The 228th was disbanded on 15 March 1954 under cost-cutting measures instituted by Governor William Stratton in which the 33rd and 44th Infantry Divisions of the Illinois Army National Guard were merged to form the new 33rd Infantry Division. The officers of the 228th were assigned to the surplus pool of the 131st Infantry Regiment while enlisted men who chose to continue their service in the National Guard were transferred to the 129th Infantry Regiment.
