= Winifred Emery =

English actress and actor-manager (1861–1924)

Winifred Emery in 1896

Winifred Emery (born Maud Isabel Emery; 1 August 1861 – 15 July 1924) was an English actress and actor-manager of the late 19th and early 20th centuries. She was the wife of the actor Cyril Maude.

Born into a family of actors, Emery began acting as a child. Her career grew through the 1880s and 1890s as she played leading roles in the West End of London. After a period away from the stage, she returned with leading roles in the company of Herbert Beerbohm Tree at His Majesty's Theatre. She continued to act steadily in her own touring theatre company with her husband and in London theatres until 1922.

== Early life and career ==
Emery was born in Manchester, Lancashire, the daughter of Samuel Anderson Emery and granddaughter of John Emery, both well-known actors in their day. Her first stage appearance was in 1870, aged 8, in J. B. Buckstone's The Green Bushes at the Alexandra Theatre in Liverpool. Her first London appearance was on 23 December 1874 when she played Happy New Year in the pantomime Beauty and the Beast at the Princess's Theatre. In 1879 she joined Marie Litton's company before appearing with Wilson Barrett at the Grand Theatre in Leeds. She moved with Barrett to the Court Theatre in London in October 1879. There she was first noticed by the critics when she appeared in the one-act play A Clerical Error.

Emery appeared in A Bridal Tour at the Haymarket Theatre in August 1880, and performed at the St James's Theatre with Sir John Hare, William Hunter Kendal and Madge Kendal. In July 1881 she joined the company of Henry Irving at the Lyceum Theatre, and there she appeared in The Bells and The Merchant of Venice. She later played at Toole's Theatre and at the Vaudeville Theatre with Thomas Thorne in The Rivals. In 1884 she became the understudy for Ellen Terry at the Lyceum Theatre and toured the United States with Henry Irving, playing in Twelfth Night, Much Ado about Nothing and The Merchant of Venice. Also for Irving, in October 1885 Emery played the title role in Olivia by W. G. Wills and toured the United States again in 1887–8.

Emery married the actor Cyril Maude on 28 April 1888 at Kensington Register Office, and they had another marriage ceremony at the Savoy Chapel on 2 June 1888. She next appeared at the Vaudeville Theatre and, for Augustus Harris, at the Theatre Royal, Drury Lane. Returning to the Vaudeville Theatre in February 1890, she played the title role in Clarissa, adapted by Robert Williams Buchanan from the novel by Samuel Richardson. In the same year, and at the same theatre, she played leading roles in The School for Scandal and She Stoops to Conquer, among others. She starred in Judah by Henry Arthur Jones at the Shaftesbury Theatre in September 1890 before appearing at the Olympic Theatre with Wilson Barrett in December 1890.

May 1891 saw Emery back at the Shaftesbury Theatre, and in February 1892 she took the title role in the original production of Oscar Wilde's Lady Windermere's Fan at the St James's Theatre. Between 1893 and 1895 Emery played the lead female roles for J. Comyns Carr at the Comedy Theatre, where she appeared in Grundy's The New Woman and Sowing the Wind and Pinero's The Benefit of the Doubt. Such was her fame by this time that her portrait was drawn by Aubrey Beardsley, appearing in the January 1895 edition of The Yellow Book. In February 1896 she appeared at the Lyceum Theatre under the management of Sir Johnston Forbes-Robertson.

== Later years ==
Emery with her children, c. 1901

In 1896 her husband became manager and leading man at the Haymarket Theatre, and Emery went with him, becoming his leading lady. However, owing to a period of illness and the birth of her son, her appearances there between 1898 and 1905 were sporadic, and included She Stoops to Conquer, in 1900, and The Second in Command, by Robert Marshall, in 1901. She made her theatrical 'comeback' in February 1905, when she played Beatrice in Much Ado about Nothing opposite Herbert Beerbohm Tree at His Majesty's Theatre. In January 1906 she appeared at the Waldorf Theatre as Mrs Pellender in The Superior Miss Pellender. Emery formed her own theatrical company and with it she and her husband toured provincial theatres, the two of them starring in Olivia and Her Son by Horace Annesley Vachell. This play transferred to the Playhouse Theatre, then under Cyril Maude's management, in March 1907.

From 1907 to 1922 Emery played leading roles in numerous productions at West End theatres, including the Playhouse Theatre with her husband; His Majesty's Theatre in The Merry Wives of Windsor; Drury Lane in The Bunking of Betty; the St James's Theatre in T. W. Robertson's Caste; the Lyric Theatre in Sir Walter Ralegh; the Vaudeville Theatre in Pinero's The Schoolmistress; the Apollo Theatre in Never Say Die by W. H. Post, starring Charles Hawtrey (1913); the Gaiety Theatre in Maeterlinck's The Betrothal, and at the Duke of York's Theatre in Pinero's The Enchanted Cottage (1922). At the Royal Command Performance in May 1911 at Drury Lane before Wilhelm II, Emery appeared in an excerpt from Bulwer-Lytton's Money; and at the Coronation Gala Performance for George V, held at His Majesty's Theatre on 27 June 1911, she played Elizabeth I in Sheridan's The Critic, directed by Sir Squire Bancroft. Her last performance was at His Majesty's Theatre on 26 February 1923 in a charity production of The Ballad Monger.

Emery died of stomach cancer at her home in Bexhill-on-Sea in Sussex, aged 62, and was buried at St Mark's Church in Bexhill.

== Family life ==
Her children with Maude included Margery Maude, who became an actress; Pamela Cynthia Maude (1893–1975); and John Cyril Maude, who became a barrister, judge and Member of Parliament. Pamela Maude married Major William La Touche Congreve VC, DSO, MC on 1 June 1916. He was killed in action on 20 July 1916 during World War I, for which he was posthumously awarded the Victoria Cross. On 22 December 1919 she married Captain William Fraser, DSO, MC (1890–1964), who eventually rose to the rank of Brigadier.

Emery brought up her niece, Winifred Isabel Emery (1890–1972), after the girl was abandoned by Emery's brother in 1895. This niece, together with her pupil Ruby Preece, was present when dramatist W. S. Gilbert died in his lake at Grim's Dyke in May 1911. Winifred Isabel Emery was the mother of poet David Gascoyne.
