= 228th =

228th may refer to:

- 228th Battalion (Northern Fusiliers), CEF, a unit in the Canadian Expeditionary Force during the First World War
- 228th Combat Communications Squadron (228 CBCS) is an Air National Guard combat communications unit at McGhee-Tyson ANGB, Tennessee
- 228th Infantry Brigade (United Kingdom), formed in both the First and Second World Wars
- 228th (Edinburgh) Heavy Anti-Aircraft Battery, Royal Artillery, a Scottish air defence unit of Britain's Territorial Army
- Toronto 228th Battalion, an ice hockey team composed of troops in the 228th (Northern Fusiliers) Battalion, CEF of the Canadian Army

== See also ==
- 228 (number)
- 228, the year 228 (CCXXVIII) of the Julian calendar
- 228 BC
