= 228th Infantry Brigade (United Kingdom) =

- Active: 26 February 1917 – 4 October 1918; 12 October 1942 – 16 September 1943
- Country: United Kingdom
- Branch: British Army
- Type: Infantry Brigade
- Garrison/HQ: First World War: Salonika front Second World War: Shetland Islands

Commanders
- Notable commanders: William Fraser

228th Brigade (228 Bde) was a formation of the British Army in both the First and Second World Wars.

== First World War ==
228th Brigade was created on 26 February 1917 as a formation of Army Troops within the British Salonika Army under Brigadier General W. C. Ross

=== Order of battle ===
The following units served in the brigade:

- 2nd Garrison Battalion The King's (Liverpool Regiment) (from 28 August 1917)
- 2/5th Battalion Durham Light Infantry (from 1 March 1917)
- 1st Garrison Battalion Seaforth Highlanders (from 1 March 1917)
- 2nd Garrison Battalion Royal Irish Fusiliers (March–August 1917)
- 22nd (Wessex and Welsh) Battalion Rifle Brigade
- 228th Machine Gun Company (formed 11 September 1917, became 277th Company)
- 228th Trench Mortar Company (formed 18 September 1917)
- 228th Signal Section, Royal Engineers (formed 15 March 1917)
- 143rd Field Ambulance, Royal Army Medical Corps (formed 19 March 1917)

=== Service ===
Although an independent formation, 228 Bde was always associated with 28th Division. It was formed of garrison battalions, which were not normally expected to serve in the front line due to the men's age or low medical category. One staff officer wrote: 'Physically the brigade was in a terrible state. They were splendid crocks ... Some were almost blind, some almost deaf, and the 22nd Rifle Brigade ... had more than sixty men over sixty years old'. Because of its slow rate of marching, the 228th became known as the 'Too Too Late Brigade'.

On 30 September 1918, during the final Allied offensive on the Salonika front, 228 Bde came under the command of the Greek Crete Division. 228 Bde was broken up on 4 October 1918.

== Second World War ==
The Second World War brigade was formed (as 228th Independent Infantry Brigade) in the Shetland Islands on 12 February 1942, by the redesignation of Headquarters Shetland Defences. Its commander was Brigadier the Hon William Fraser.

=== Composition ===
The following units served in the brigade:

- 2nd Battalion, Royal Scots (until 17 November 1942)
- 7th Battalion, King's Own Scottish Borderers (until 14 July 1943)
- 10th Battalion, Highland Light Infantry (until 2 December 1942)
- 4th Battalion, Cameron Highlanders (18 November – 19 December 1942)
- 7th Battalion, North Staffordshire Regiment (3 December 1942 – 28 July 1943)
- 2nd Battalion, Cameron Highlanders (20 December 1943 – 15 September 1943)

=== Service ===
228 Bde served under OSDEF (Orkney & Shetland Defences) until 16 September 1943, when the brigade was disbanded.
