= Alice Holt Forest =

Forest in Hampshire, England

Coordinates: 51.168°N 0.843°W

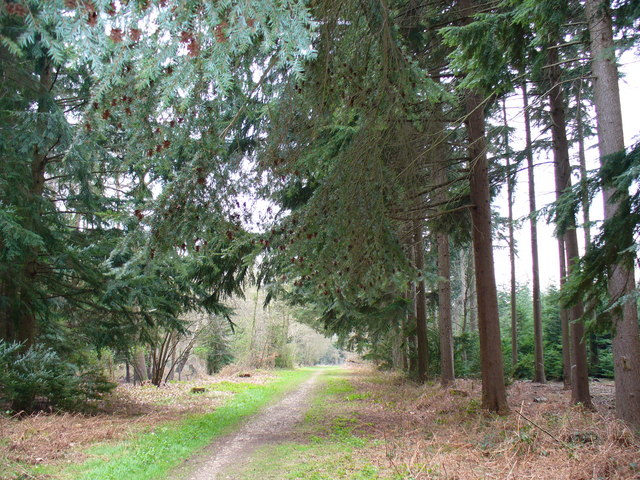
Rural scenery in the Alice Holt Forest

Alice Holt Forest is a royal forest in Hampshire, situated some 4 miles (6.4 km) south of Farnham, Surrey. Once predominantly an ancient oak forest, it was particularly noted in the 18th and 19th centuries for the timber it supplied for the building of ships for the Royal Navy. It is now planted mainly with conifers. Forestry England took over the management of the forest in 1924, and a research station was set up in 1946 in the Alice Holt Lodge, a former manor house. The forest is now part of the South Downs National Park, which was established on 31 March 2010, and it forms the most northerly gateway to the park.

== Toponymy ==
The first part of the name, Alice, is believed to be most likely derived from Ælfsige, Bishop of Winchester in AD 984, whose see (or diocese) had rights over the forest, and was responsible for the land on behalf of the king. It is suggested that the name then became corrupted, with the name Alfsiholt being found in documents before the Norman Conquest (and later in 1169), followed by Alfieseholt in 1242, Halfyesholt in 1301, Aisholt in 1362/63 and finally Alice Holt in 1373. The second part of the name is derived from the Old English holt, a wood or thicket, usually a managed wood of a single species.

Other, less plausible, suggestions have been made that Alice could be a corruption of alor, Old English for alder, or ysel, Old English for ash, referring to the ashes left in the woods by the once numerous Romano-British pottery kilns. It was called Alder Holt Wood on the Ordnance Survey Maps Series 1 map 8 of 1 May 1816.

== Geology and ecology ==
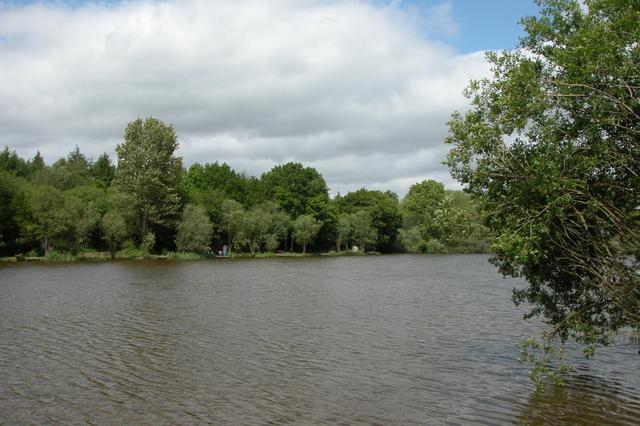
Lodge Pond, Alice Holt Forest

The Forest is situated in the western Weald. It lies in the Gault clay vale that separates the chalk ridge which runs between Farnham and Alton from the malmstone (Greensand) hills or "hangers" (from the Old English hangra, wood on a steep slope) around Binsted. It occupies a low plateau with steeply sloping edges where deposits of stony Pleistocene drift, the remnants of ancient pre-glacial river terrace of the "Proto-Wey", overlie the heavy, wet Gault.

Alice Holt Forest was noted for the oak woodlands that grew on its thick Gault clay. In the 18th century the celebrated naturalist, Gilbert White, who lived nearby at Selborne, contrasted Alice Holt with the adjacent Woolmer Forest. He noted 'Though these two forests are only parted by a narrow range of enclosures, yet no two soils can be more different; for the Holt consists of a strong loam, of a miry nature, carrying a good turf, and abounding with oaks that grow to be large timber; while Woolmer is nothing but a hungry, sandy, barren waste', consisting 'entirely of sand covered with heath and fern...without having one standing tree in the whole extent'.

The forest is now mainly planted with conifers. According to Forestry England, Alice Holt Forest Park today covers 851 hectares (2,100 acres) of mainly Corsican pine but approximately 140 hectares (350 acres) of oak, planted in 1815, still remain. Some broad-leaved species have also been reintroduced as part of a regeneration programme.

== Archaeology and history ==
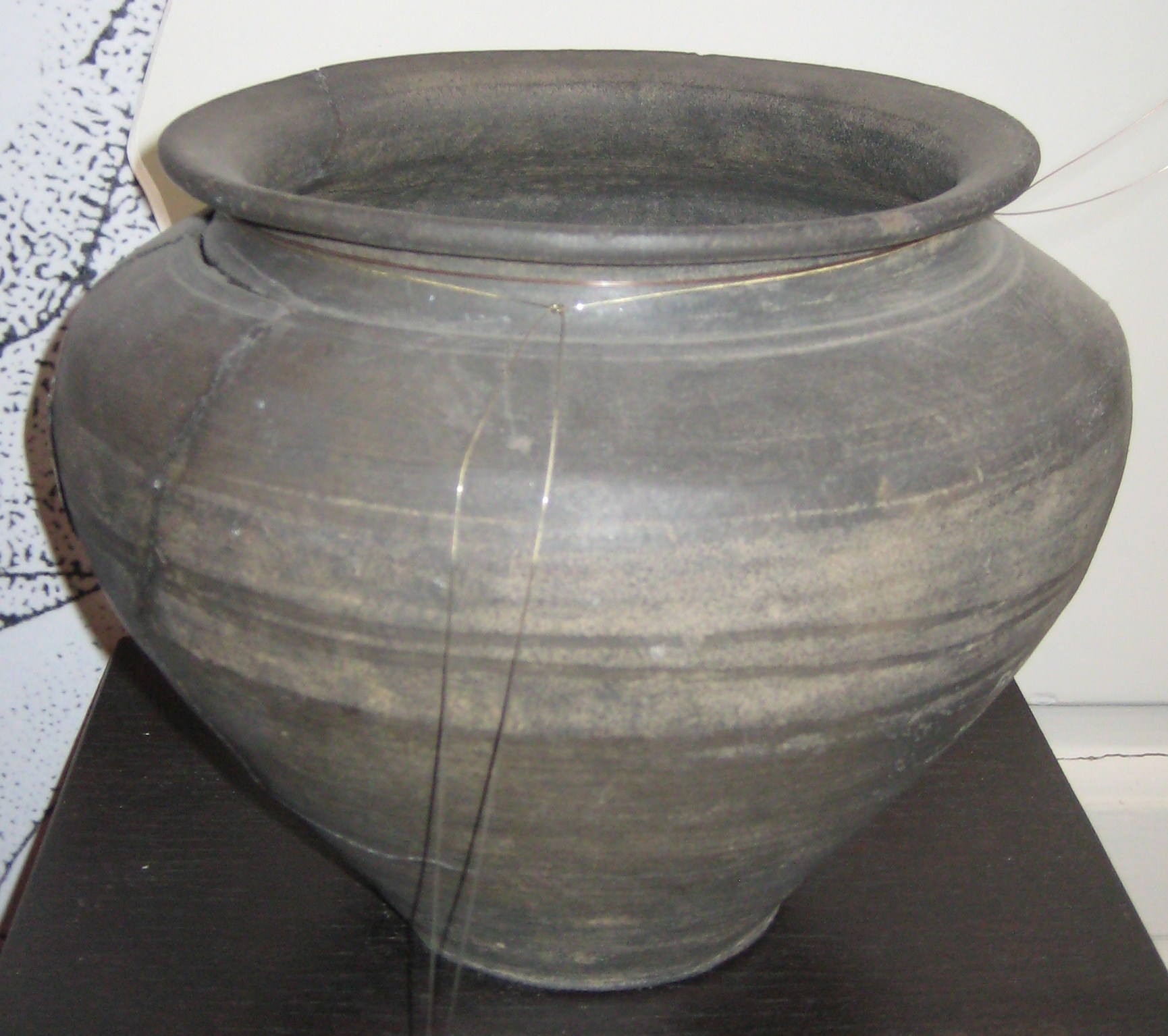
Roman cinerary urn of Alice Holt ware, 2nd century AD, excavated from near Farnham station in 1902.

A few finds of Paleolithic tools indicate the use of the area by Old Stone Age hunters during previous inter-glacial periods, but the Forest as we know it originated in the Atlantic period: the warm, wet phase which followed the retreat of the last Ice Age in Britain, some 7000 years ago. Occasional Mesolithic flints show early hunter-gatherers utilised the Forest, and although there are a few Iron Age tumuli (burial mounds), the area seems to have been sparsely populated prior to the Roman period, on account of its unsuitability for farming.

Extensive kiln sites and associated claypits exist, which date from the Roman occupation of Britain. The local antiquary Major A.G. Wade undertook limited investigations in the 1930s and 40s. Major research was undertaken in the 1970s by the Alice Holt Survey Group, under the co-direction of Malcolm Lyne and Rosemary Jefferies. These indicated that the Forest and surrounding areas were one of the most important centres for the industrial-scale production of domestic ceramics in Roman Britannia, supplying up to 60% of all pottery found in excavations at Staines and London and being transported across south-east England throughout the period from AD60 to the early 5th century, when industrial pottery production ceased. Alice Holt gives its name to a particular diagnostic pottery style from the Romano-British period, Alice Holt Pottery, a coarse grey sandy ware .

The area was subject to Forest Law (together with nearby Woolmer Forest) from the time of William the Conqueror and remained a Royal Forest thereafter.

The forests of Alice Holt and Woolmer, only separated by a narrow belt of cultivated and meadow land, were usually considered as one forest from at least medieval times, having been under the same administration from time immemorial and being managed by a single lord warden, and indeed were once known as the Royal Forest of Alice Holt and Woolmer.

Throughout the Middle Ages there are incidental documentary references to the deer (both red and fallow) and timber in the joint forest, but the first detailed survey was made in 1635, and this showed their total area to be 15,493 acres (6,270 ha); this was said to have been much the same as in the year 1300, though in earlier times the forest may have been considerably larger. Little had changed when a further survey was made in 1790, although by then 6,799 acres (2,751 ha) were privately owned.

From the 1770s onwards the Alice Holt and Woolmer forests were required to devote themselves primarily to producing oak for the Royal Navy, though they had been neglected and their trees were past their prime. The Lieutenant of the Forest was dismissed in 1811 and four years later the Office of Woods initiated a massive re-planting programme on 1,600 acres (650 ha) of Alice Holt, all oaks. Records of traffic in oak timber during the Napoleonic Wars indicate that the logs were taken not to Portsmouth, the nearest port, but 10 miles (16 km) overland to the River Wey at Godalming, Surrey, whence they were shipped or floated down to the Thames dockyards in London.

Many of the oaks planted in 1815 were still there 100 years later, but many were then felled during World War I. Replacement of the oaks by conifers took place between the two world wars, and accelerated in World War II. When the Forestry Commission took over Alice Holt, Woolmer and other Crown forests in 1924, Alice Holt had become much reduced in extent, covering 2,142 acres (867 ha), and Woolmer was slightly smaller.

On 31 March 2010 Alice Holt Forest, along with the rest of the western Weald, became part of the South Downs National Park.

Recently Alice Holt oak has been used to build a replica of Shakespeare's Globe Theatre in London.

== Environmental designations ==
The forest is a designated Site of Interest for Nature Conservation. Part of it is dedicated as a research area, used for studies into subjects such as forest carbon dynamics, environmental change and wood fuels.

== Recreational facilities ==
The forest is one of the Forestry England's most popular destinations, attracting over 290,000 visitors a year. Its facilities include a cafe, natural spaces and outdoor play structures for children to explore, cycle hire, and over 8 miles of waymarked trails for walking and cycling. Every Saturday, a timed 5 km run held by Parkrun takes place in the forest, with an average of 233 runners per event. Horse-riding is permitted in some parts of the forest. A notable success has been the Cycling for All project, which provides opportunities for people of all ages and abilities to improve their health and well-being through cycling. The Forestry England's project partner Cycling UK now regards Alice Holt Forest as a national centre of excellence for cycling, and it has been used as an example of best practice for projects elsewhere.
