= List of commanders of the British 2nd Division =

2nd Division 2nd Infantry Division 2nd Armoured Division
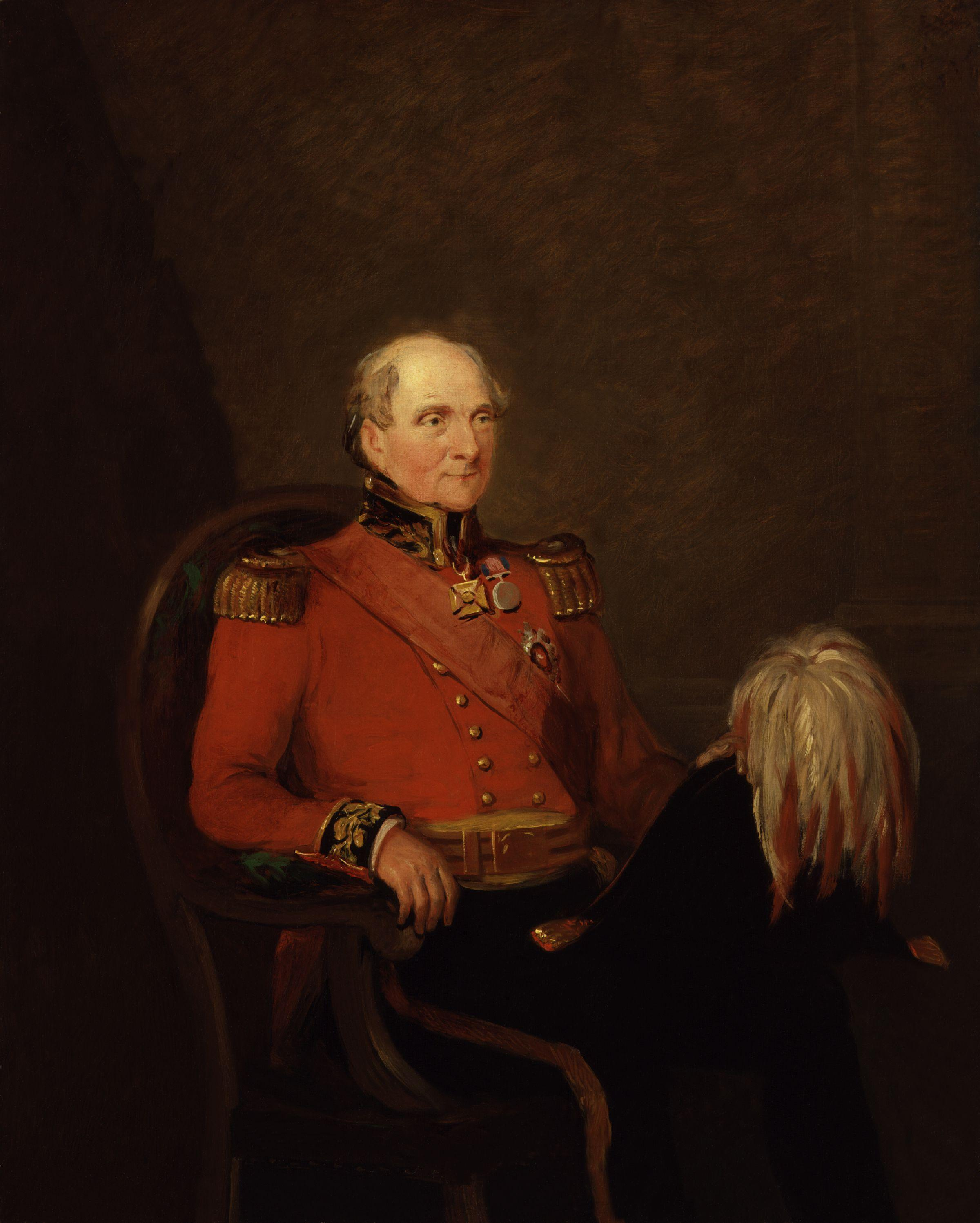
- A portrait of the division's first general officer commanding, Roland Hill, by William Salter
- Active: Raised and disbanded numerous times between 1809 and 2012
- Country: United Kingdom
- Branch: British Army
- Engagements: Napoleonic Wars; Crimean War; Second Boer War; First World War; Second World War

The 2nd Division was an infantry division of the British Army, which was first formed in 1809 and finally disbanded in 2012. The division was commanded by a general officer commanding (GOC). In this role, he would receive orders from a level above him in the chain of command, and then use the forces within the division to undertake the mission assigned. In addition to directing the tactical battle the division was involved in, the GOC oversaw a staff and the administrative, logistical, medical, training, and discipline of the division. The division had 65 different permanent GOCs over its history that spanned 203 years.

Prior to 1809, the British Army did not use divisional formations. As the British military grew in size during the Napoleonic Wars, the need arose for such an implementation in order to better organise forces for administrative, logistical, and tactical reasons. The 2nd Division was formed on 18 June 1809 by Lieutenant-General Arthur Wellesley, and served in the Peninsular War (part of the Napoleonic Wars). After the Peninsular War ended in 1814, the division was disbanded only to be re-raised the following year when the War of the Seventh Coalition broke out. The division fought at the Battle of Waterloo, and played a pivotal role in the defeat of the final French attack of the day. The division's light infantry brigade flanked and attacked the French Imperial Guard, causing them to falter, and then retreat. The brigade then spearheaded the British general advance after the retreating French forces. In December 1818, the division was disbanded once again.

During the mid to late 19th century, several formations bore the name "2nd Division". The ones that fought in the Crimean War and the Second Boer War were considered to be part of the same lineage as the two that fought in the Napoleonic Wars by Everard Wyrall, who compiled the 2nd Division's First World War official history. Reformed in 1854, the division fought in the Crimean War against the Russian Empire. It served throughout the siege of Sevastopol, had a critical role in the Battle of Inkerman, and was stood down at the end of the war in 1856. A new 2nd Division was mobilised in 1899, for action in the Second Boer War. It took part in all the battles that comprised the Relief of Ladysmith, and was broken-up at the end of 1900 when conventional warfare ended. This allowed the division's personnel to be reassigned to mobile columns or to garrison towns, in an effort to combat the guerrilla tactics that the Boers employed.

In 1902, the division was reformed as a permanent formation. It was based at Aldershot, in southern England, prior to the First World War and during the inter-war period. In 1914, the division deployed to France shortly after the war started as part of the British Expeditionary Force. It served on the Western Front between 1914 and 1918. During the Second World War, the division was again deployed to France in the opening stages of the war. In the subsequent Battle of France, the division was forced to evacuate back to England. In 1942, the formation was transported to India, and subsequently fought in Burma in 1944 and 1945. In the post-war years, it formed part of the British Army of the Rhine in Germany. In 1976, the infantry division was transformed into an armoured formation based in Germany, but was disbanded at the end of 1982. The 2nd Division was then reformed in York, England, in 1983. Following the end of the Cold War, the division was once again disbanded. It was re-raised in 1994 as a training formation and maintained this role until 2012, when it was disbanded for the final time.

== General officer commanding ==
General officer commanding
No.	Appointment date	Rank	General officer commanding	Notes	Source(s)
1	18 June 1809	Major-General	Rowland Hill	The division was formed for the first time, during the Peninsular War, from troops based in Portugal.	
N/A	20 June 1810	Major-General	James Leith	Leith was scheduled to take command of the division on this date, but never did. Instead, he was given command of the 5th Division.	
Acting	8 August 1810	Major-General	William Stewart	Stewart became acting commander of the division, due to Hill being stricken with fever.	
2	29 November 1810	Major-General	William Stewart	On this date, Stewart formally became the commander.	
1	May 1811	Major-General	Rowland Hill	Once Hill recovered from his period of sickness, he returned and retook command of the division.	
Acting	1812	Lieutenant-General	Christopher Tilson-Chowne	Held the local rank of lieutenant-general. Alternatively known as Christopher Tilson and Christopher Chowne.	
2	1812/1813	Major-General	William Stewart	Stewart returned to the peninsula in late 1812. At the division's next battle, the Battle of Maya in July 1813, Stewart was again in command. He was wounded in this battle.	
Acting	30 July 1813	Major-General	William Pringle	Took temporary command of the division following William Stewart's injury during the Battle of Maya in July 1813.	
Acting	4 August 1813	Major-General	George Walker		
2	September 1813	Major-General	William Stewart		
3	May 1814	Major-General	William Anson	At the conclusion of the Peninsular War, the division was disbanded in France. The final troops departed in June.	
4	11 April 1815	Lieutenant-General	Henry Clinton	The division was reformed on this date from troops based in the Southern Netherlands. Clinton led the division from its inception through the Battle of Waterloo, and as part of the Army of Occupation that was based in France after the war. He held command until the division was disbanded in France, during December 1818.	
5	20 June 1854	Lieutenant-General	George de Lacy Evans	The division was formed in Varna, Ottoman Bulgaria, from British troops who had been assembled, and had prepared to move to the Crimean peninsular during the Crimean War.	
Acting	1854	Major-General	John Pennefather	Pennefather was acting commander of the division, after de Lacy Evans had been injured following a fall from his horse. He commanded the division at the Battle of Inkerman on 5 November 1854.	
6	23 January 1855	Lieutenant-General	John Pennefather	In early 1855, Pennefather went on sick leave and an unknown officer took command. Pennefather returned to command by March 1855.	
7	19 July 1855	Lieutenant-General	Edwin Markham	In 1856, after the end of the war, the division was disbanded in Crimea.	
8	9 October 1899	Lieutenant-General	Francis Clery	A new 2nd Division was formed in England, and then moved to southern Africa to fight in the Second Boer War. Clery was a major-general when the division was mobilised, but given the temporary rank of lieutenant-general once in Africa. The division was broken up at the end of 1900, while still in southern Africa.	
9	February 1900	Major-General	Neville Lyttelton	Temporary commander, while Clery was ill	
10	1 April 1902	Major-General	Charles Douglas	This marked the first time the 2nd Division was formed as a permanent formation, and not as raised on an ad hoc basis for a particular war. Douglas left his position on 12 February 1904.	
11	1 March 1904	Major-General	Bruce Hamilton	Hamilton was also the commander of the 3rd Brigade, until 2 May 1904. On 12 February 1907, Hamilton ended his tenure as the divisional commander.	
12	12 May 1907	Major-General	Theodore Stephenson		
13	1 February 1910	Major-General	Henry Lawson		
14	1 February 1914	Major-General	Archibald Murray		
15	5 August 1914	Major-General	Charles Monro	The division was dispatched to France on the outbreak of the First World War.	
Acting	26 December 1914	Brigadier-General	Robert Fanshawe		
16	1 January 1915	Major-General	Henry Horne		
17	5 November 1915	Major-General	William Walker		
18	27 December 1916	Major-General	Cecil Pereira	Pereira held command for the duration of the war. In 1919, the division entered Germany. It was then renamed, and ceased to exist on 17 February 1919.	
19	28 June 1919	Major-General	Richard Butler	The 2nd Division was reformed in England on this date	
20	3 April 1923	Major-General	Peter Strickland		
21	1 October 1926	Major-General	Edmund Ironside		
22	26 October 1928	Major-General	Thomas Cubitt	Cubitt was promoted to lieutenant-general during his tenure as division commander.	
23	11 March 1931	Major-General	Henry Jackson		
24	11 March 1935	Major-General	Archibald Wavell		
25	19 August 1937	Major-General	Henry Wilson		
26	15 June 1939	Major-General	Charles Loyd	The division was now known as the 2nd Infantry Division. On the outbreak of the Second World War, the division was dispatched to France.	
Acting	16 May 1940	Brigadier	Francis Davidson		
27	20 May 1940	Major-General	Noel Irwin	During Irwin's tenure, the division was evacuated from France and returned to England.	
Acting	12 August 1940	Brigadier	Charles Findlay		
Acting	15 August 1940	Brigadier	Gerald Gartlan		
28	18 September 1940	Major-General	Daril Watson		
29	11 October 1941	Major-General	John Grover	In April 1942, the division was dispatched to British India.	
30	8 July 1944	Major-General	Cameron Nicholson		
Acting	15 August 1944	Brigadier	Michael West		
30	23 August 1944	Major-General	Cameron Nicholson		
Acting	26 August 1944	Brigadier	Henry Bourke		
30	10 September 1944	Major-General	Cameron Nicholson		
Acting	13 September 1944	Brigadier	Henry Bourke		
30	24 September 1944	Major-General	Cameron Nicholson	The division took part in the Burma campaign of 1944–45, and fought at the battles of Kohima and Mandalay.	
Acting	1 June 1945	Brigadier	Henry Bourke		
30	12 July 1945	Major-General	Cameron Nicholson		
31	1946	Major-General	Robert Arkwright		
32	October 1946	Major-General	John Churcher	After the conclusion of hostilities, the division absorbed the 36th Infantry Division. The division then moved to Malaya, and was disbanded in 1946.	
33	February 1947	Major-General	Philip Balfour	The division was reformed in Germany, by the re-designation of the 53rd (Welsh) Infantry Division. Balfour, who had been the GOC of the 53rd, retained his position.	
34	November 1947	Major-General	Philip Roberts		
35	1949	Major-General	Colin Callander	Callander ended his appointment on 26 April 1951	
36	2 July 1951	Major-General	Basil Coad		
37	5 October 1954	Major-General	John Wilsey		
38	1 May 1956	Major-General	Cosmo Nevill		
39	16 April 1958	Major-General	William Stirling	The formation was now known as the 2nd Division.	
40	8 February 1960	Major-General	Alexander Williams		
41	20 February 1962	Major-General	Mervyn Butler		
42	4 March 1964	Major-General	Norman Wheeler		
43	28 March 1966	Major-General	John Sharp	Sharp ended his tenure in command on 1 December 1967	
44	1 January 1968	Major-General	Chandos Blair		
45	15 March 1970	Major-General	Rollo Pain		
46	15 March 1972	Major-General	John Archer		
47	25 February 1974	Major-General	Desmond Mangham		
48	22 January 1976	Major-General	Frank Kitson	Kitson took command of the division prior to and led it during its reorganisation into the 2nd Armoured Division.	
49	28 February 1978	Major-General	Alexander Boswell		
50	12 March 1980	Major-General	Martin Farndale	Final commander of the 2nd Armoured Division. The division was disbanded in Germany at the end of 1983.	
51	1 January 1983	Major-General	Patrick Palmer	The 2nd Infantry Division was reformed in England on this date. Palmer was made GOC North East District, in conjunction with commanding the division.	
52	12 January 1984	Major-General	Peter Inge	Also the GOC North East District	
53	18 January 1988	Major-General	Charles Guthrie	Also the GOC North East District	
54	13 November 1987	Major-General	Murray Naylor	Also the GOC North East District	
55	30 October 1989	Major-General	Michael Rose	Also the GOC North East District	
56	30 September 1991	Major-General	Michael Walker	Also the GOC North East District. Walker was the final GOC of the 2nd Infantry Division, before it was disbanded in early 1992 as part of the 1990s Options for Change.	
57	1994	Major-General	Patrick Cordingley	Cordingley became GOC Eastern District on 23 November 1992. The 2nd Division was refounded in 1994.	
58	1 July 1996	Major-General	Dair Farrar-Hockley		
59	14 May 1999	Major General	Robert Gordon	This marks the first occasion of the hyphen being dropped from major-general in The London Gazette.	
60	18 November 2002	Major General	Nick Parker		
61	1 March 2004	Major General	Euan Loudon		
62	22 January 2007	Major General	David McDowall		
63	29 May 2009	Major General	Andrew Mackay	Resigned from position in protest to the then ongoing operations in Afghanistan	
64	26 October 2009	Major General	David Shaw		
65	4 January 2012	Major General	Nick Eeles	The division was disbanded in April 2012, as part of an army restructure.	

== See also ==
- List of orders of battle for the British 2nd Division
- List of Victoria Cross recipients from the British 2nd Division
