= Brade =

Brade is a surname. Notable people with the surname include:

- Alexander Curt Brade (1881–1971), German-Brazilian botanist
- Beau Brade (born 2002), American football player
- Reginald Brade (1864–1933), British civil servant
- William Brade (1560–1630), English composer, violinist, and viol player

== See also ==
- Brades, a village in Montserrat
