= List of Victoria Cross recipients from the British 2nd Division =

British military decoration recipients

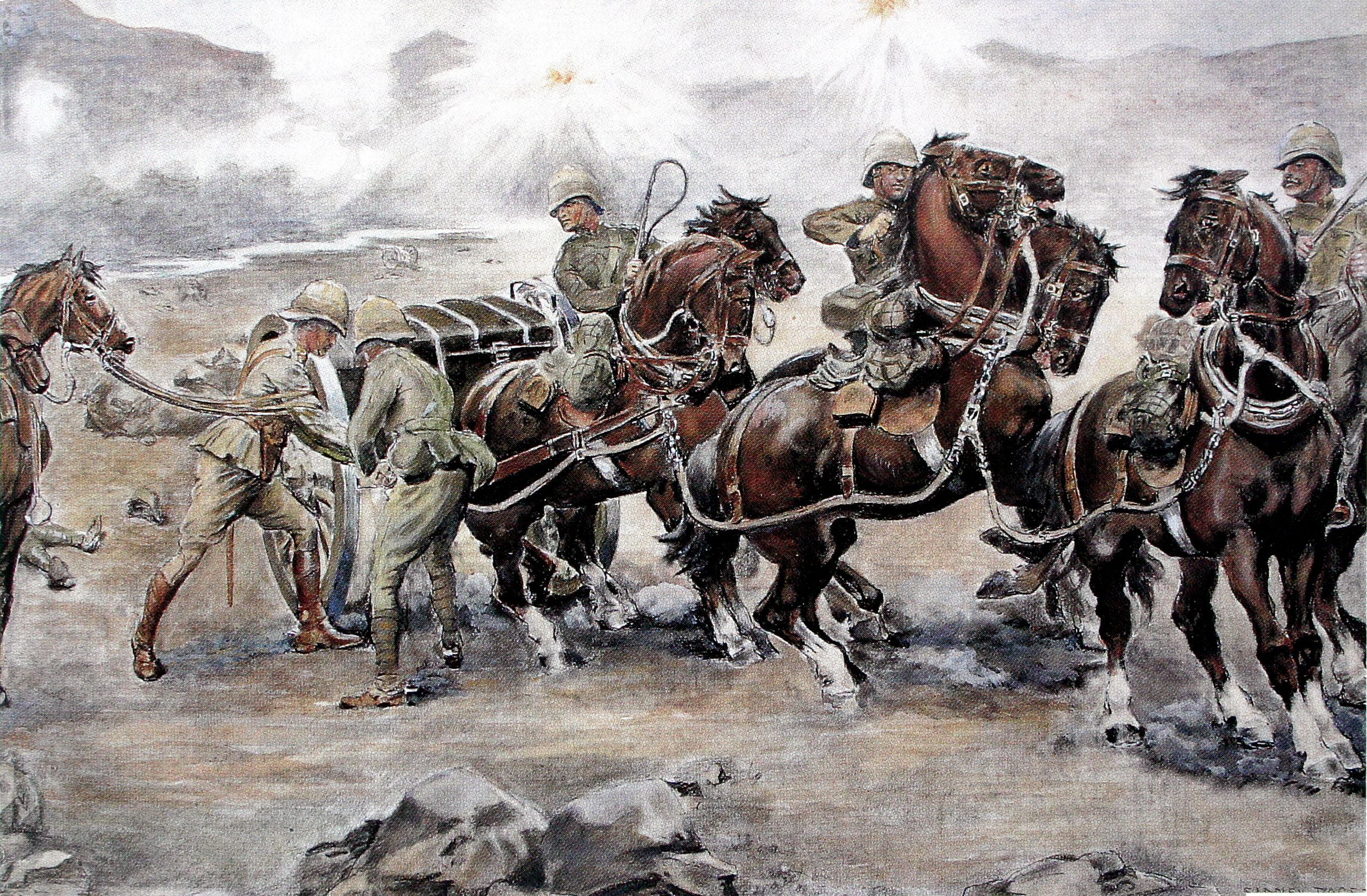
Saving the guns at Colenso, by Sidney Paget, depicts the event that resulted in the 2nd Division earning four Victoria Cross medals

The Victoria Cross (VC) is a military decoration awarded for valour "in the face of the enemy" to members of armed forces of some Commonwealth countries and previous British Empire territories. The VC was introduced, in Great Britain, on 29 January 1856 by Queen Victoria to reward acts of valour during the Crimean War. It takes precedence over all other orders, decorations and medals. It may be awarded to a person of any rank in any service, and to civilians under military command. All those who earn the VC have their names published in The London Gazette.

The 2nd Division was an infantry division of the British Army, which was formed and disbanded several times over a 200-year period. It was raised in 1854, to take part in the Crimean War against the Russian Empire. It played an important role in the Battle of Inkerman, and was engaged throughout the Siege of Sevastopol (1854–1855). In 1856, after the conclusion of hostilities, the division was disbanded. During the war, ten VCs were earned by members of the division. It was formed again, in 1899, for service in the Second Boer War. The division took part in all the notable battles that made up the Relief of Ladysmith. At the end of 1900, when conventional warfare ended, the division was broken-up so its forces could be reassigned in an effort to combat the Boer guerrilla tactics. During this period, a further eight VCs were earned by soldiers who were part of the division. The division was reformed in 1902, and went on to fight in many of the major battles on the Western Front during the First World War (1914–1918). During the four years of war, eighteen members of the division earned VCs. The division next saw combat during the Second World War (1939–1945), which resulted in three more soldiers being awarded the VC. Since the Second World War, the division has not been in battle and was disbanded for the final time in 2012.

== Recipients ==
Date of action	Rank	Name	Unit	Place of action	Country of action	Sources +Recipients
26 October 1854	Brevet-Major	John Conolly	49th Regiment of Foot	Inkerman, Crimea	Russia	
26 October 1854	Sergeant Major	Ambrose Madden	41st Regiment of Foot	Inkerman, Crimea	Russia	
30 October 1854	Corporal	James Owens	49th Regiment of Foot	Crimea	Russia	
5 November 1854	Private	Thomas Beach	55th Regiment of Foot	Inkerman, Crimea	Russia	
5 November 1854	Private	John McDermond	47th Regiment of Foot	Inkerman, Crimea	Russia	
5 November 1854	Brevet-Major	Hugh Rowlands	41st Regiment of Foot	Inkerman, Crimea	Russia	
5 November 1854	Brevet-Major	Mark Walker	30th Regiment of Foot	Inkerman, Crimea	Russia	
5 November 1854	Sergeant	George Walters	49th Regiment of Foot	Inkerman, Crimea	Russia	
8 September 1855	Lieutenant-Colonel	Frederick Maude	3rd Regiment of Foot	Sevastopol, Crimea	Russia	
8 September 1855	Private	John Connors	3rd Regiment of Foot	Sevastopol, Crimea	Russia	
15 December 1899	Major	William Babtie	Royal Army Medical Corps	Colenso	Natal	
15 December 1899	Captain	Walter Congreve	Rifle Brigade	Colenso	Natal	
15 December 1899	Corporal	George Nurse	Royal Field Artillery	Colenso	Natal	
15 December 1899	Captain	Hamilton Reed	Royal Field Artillery	Colenso	Natal	
15 December 1899	Lieutenant	Frederick Roberts	King's Royal Rifle Corps	Colenso	Natal	
15 December 1899	Captain	Harry Schofield	Royal Field Artillery	Colenso	Natal	
23 February 1900	Private	Albert Curtis	East Surrey Regiment	Wynne's Hill	Natal	
27 February 1900	Captain	Conwyn Mansel-Jones	West Yorkshire Regiment	Tugela	Natal	
23 August 1914	Corporal	Charles Garforth	15th The King's Hussars	Harmingnies	Belgium	
25–26 August 1914	Lance Corporal	George Wyatt	Coldstream Guards	Landrecies	France	
14 September 1914	Private	George Wilson	Highland Light Infantry	Verneuil	France	
19–20 September 1914	Captain	Harry Ranken	Royal Army Medical Corps	Haute-Avesnes	France	
28 September 1914	Lance Corporal	Frederick Dobson	Coldstream Guards	Near Soupir	France	
29 October–8 November 1914	Lieutenant	Arthur Martin-Leake	Royal Army Medical Corps	Zonnebeke	Belgium	
11 November 1914	Lieutenant	Walter Brodie	Highland Light Infantry	Becelaere	Belgium	
1 February 1915	Lance Corporal	Michael O'Leary	Irish Guards	Cuinchy	France	
16 May 1915	Lance Corporal	Joseph Tombs	King's (Liverpool Regiment)	Rue du Bois	France	
25 September 1915	Captain	Arthur Kilby	South Staffordshire Regiment	Cuinchy	France	
27 September 1915	Corporal	Alfred Burt	Hertfordshire Regiment	Cuinchy	France	
16 November 1915	Second Lieutenant	Alexander Turner	Princess Charlotte of Wales's (Royal Berkshire Regiment)	Vermelles	France	
24 October 1916	Sergeant	Albert Gill	King's Royal Rifle Corps	Delville Wood	France	
17 February 1917	Lance Sergeant	Frederick Palmer	Royal Fusiliers	Near Miraumont	France	
29 April 1917	Lance Corporal	James Welch	Princess Charlotte of Wales's (Royal Berkshire Regiment)	Oppy	France	
30 November 1917	Lieutenant (Acting Captain)	Walter Stone	Royal Fusiliers	Near Moeuvres	France	
30 November–1 December 1917	Lieutenant (Acting Captain)	Allastair McReady-Diarmid	Duke of Cambridge's Own (Middlesex Regiment)	Near Moeuvres	France	
16 April 1918	Private	Jack Counter	King's (Liverpool Regiment)	Boisieux St. Marc	France	
15–16 May 1940	Second Lieutenant	Richard Annand	Durham Light Infantry	River Dyle	Belgium	
21 May 1940	Company Sergeant-Major	George Gristock	Royal Norfolk Regiment	River Escaut near Tournai	Belgium	
4–6 May 1944	Lieutenant (Temporary Captain)	John Randle	Royal Norfolk Regiment	Kohima	India	

== See also ==
- List of orders of battle for the British 2nd Division
- List of commanders of the British 2nd Division
