= Gentleman Usher to the Sword of State =

Gentleman Usher to the Sword of State is a position in the British Royal Household. On certain state occasions he is responsible for the Sword of State, and delivers it to whichever person has been designated to bear it before the monarch.

Responsibility for the Sword of State is included in a list of instructions for Gentlemen Ushers which was published in the reign of King Charles II:

"The Gentleman Usher is to send a yeoman usher for the Sword of State and is to put it after his obeisance in the Chaire of State and is afterwards to deliver it to the Lord that my Lord Chamberlaine or Mr Vice Chamberlaine shall appoint him to doe when the King goeth to Chappell or any other place in State".

== List of Gentlemen Ushers to the Sword of State ==
- 10 January 1837 – 1874?: Sir William Martins
- vacant
- 23 July 1901 – 1 December 1915: Sir Spencer Ponsonby-Fane
- 27 June 1919 – 20 May 1924: Sir Edward Goschen, 1st Baronet
- 3 November 1924 – 1933: Sir Reginald Brade
- 10 March 1933 – 22 March 1946: Lieutenant General Sir Lewis Halliday
- 22 March 1946 – 4 November 1966: Air Chief Marshal Sir Arthur Barratt
- 3 February 1967 – 1973: General Sir William Stirling
- 26 October 1973 – 7 April 1980: Admiral Sir Desmond Dreyer
- 7 April 1980 – 2 May 1988: Air Chief Marshal Sir John Barraclough
- 2 May 1988 – 1997: General Sir Edward Burgess
- 1997 – 1 December 2005: Admiral Sir Michael Layard
- 1 December 2005 – ????: Air Chief Marshal Sir John Allison
- 2013 – present: General Sir Kevin O'Donoghue

== See also ==
- Gentleman Usher
