= Arthur Barratt =

Royal Air Force Air Chief Marshal (1894–1966)

Sir Arthur Barratt
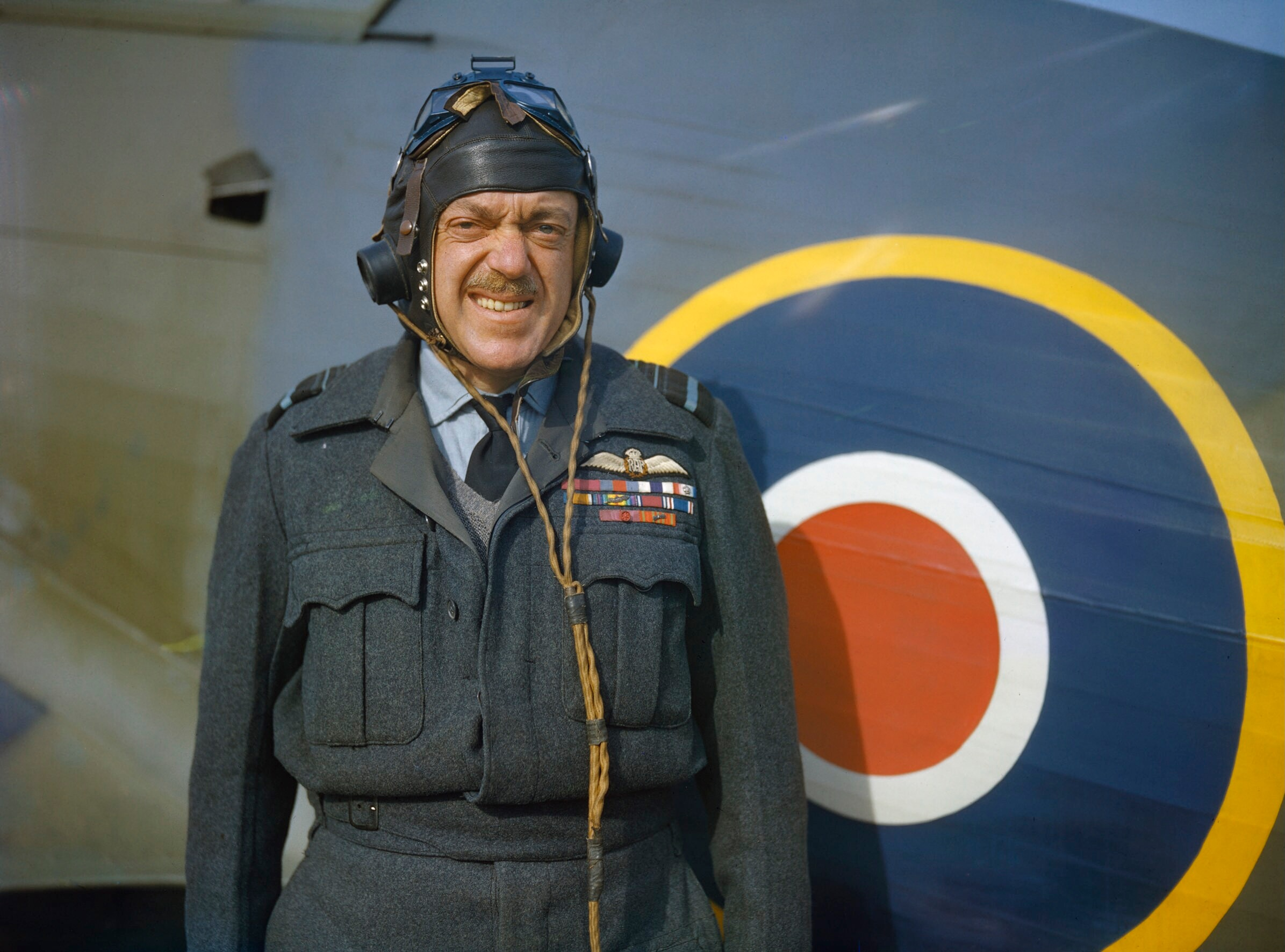
- Air Marshal Barratt in front of a Hurricane which he often used to visit his airfields
- Born: 25 February 1891; Peshawar, British India
- Died: 4 November 1966 (aged 75)
- Military career
- Allegiance: United Kingdom
- Branch: British Army (1910–1918); Royal Air Force (1918–1947)
- Service years: 1910–1947
- Rank: Air Chief Marshal
- Nickname: "Ugly"
- Commands: Inspector-General of the RAF (1945–1947); Technical Training Command (1943–1945); Army Cooperation Command (1940–1943); British Air Forces in France (1940); RAF Staff College, Andover (1936–1939); No. 1 (Indian) Group (1931–1932); School of Army Co-operation (1926–1927); 3rd (Corps) Wing (1917–1919); No. 49 Squadron (1917); No. 6 Squadron (1916–1917)
- Conflicts: First World War; Second World War
- Awards: Knight Commander of the Order of the Bath; Companion of the Order of St Michael and St George; Military Cross; Mentioned in Despatches (6); Officer of the Order of the Crown (Belgium); Croix de guerre (Belgium); Grand Cross of the Legion of Honour (France); Croix de guerre (France); Commander's Cross with Star of the Order of Polonia Restituta (Poland)
- Other work: Gentleman Usher to the Sword of State

Air Chief Marshal Sir Arthur Sheridan Barratt, KCB, CMG, MC, DL (25 February 1891 – 4 November 1966) was an officer in the Royal Flying Corps during the First World War and a senior commander in the Royal Air Force during the Second World War. He acquired the nickname "Ugly".

== RAF career ==
Barratt was commissioned into the Royal Field Artillery in 1910 and transferred to the Royal Flying Corps in 1914. He served in the First World War, commanding No. 6 Squadron and then No. 49 Squadron before taking over 3rd (Corps) Wing. After the war he became Assistant Commandant at the Royal Air Force College Cranwell and then Staff Officer for Administration at Headquarters No. 3 Group. He was made Commandant at the School of Army Co-operation in 1926 and Air Staff Officer to the General Officer Commanding Shanghai in April 1927 before joining the Air Staff at Headquarters No. 22 Group in November 1927. He went on to be Chief Instructor at the RAF Staff College, Andover in 1929, Air Officer Commanding No. 1 (Indian) Group in 1931 and Senior Air Staff Officer at Headquarters RAF India in 1932. After that he was Director of Staff Duties at the Air Ministry in 1935 and then returned to the RAF Staff College, Andover, as Commandant in 1936.

He served in the Second World War as Principal RAF Liaison Officer to the French Air Force and then Air Officer Commanding-in-Chief British Air Forces in France. When he heard that on 14 May 1940, forty of the seventy-one British bombers that had taken off did not return, he is said to have cried. He continued his war service as Air Officer Commanding-in-Chief at Army Co-operation Command in November 1940 and Air Officer Commanding-in-Chief at Technical Training Command in 1943. His last appointment was as Inspector-General of the RAF in 1945, in which capacity he took part in the Victory Parade in June 1946 before retiring in 1947.

Military offices
Preceded by Wilfrid Freeman	Commandant of the RAF Staff College, Andover; 1936–1939	Vacant Second World War declared
Preceded by Sir John Babington	Air Officer Commanding-in-Chief Technical Training Command; 1943–1945	Succeeded by Sir Ralph Sorley
Preceded by Sir Edgar Ludlow-Hewitt	Inspector-General of the RAF; 1945–1947	Succeeded by Sir Norman Bottomley
Court offices
Preceded by Sir Lewis Halliday	Gentleman Usher to the Sword of State; 1946–1966	Succeeded by Sir William Stirling
