= List of orders of battle for the British 2nd Division =

2nd Division 2nd Infantry Division 2nd Armoured Division
- The divisional insignia used from ~1940 until 2012
- Active: Raised and disbanded numerous times between 1809 and 2012
- Country: United Kingdom
- Branch: British Army
- Engagements: Napoleonic Wars; Crimean War; Second Boer War; First World War; Second World War

An order of battle is a list of the various elements of a military formation organised within a hierarchical command structure. It can also provide information on the strength of that formation and the equipment used. An order of battle is not necessarily a set structure, and it can change depending on tactical or strategic developments, or the evolution of military doctrine. For example, a division could be altered radically from one campaign to another through the adding or removing of subunits, but retain its identity and prior history. The size of a division can vary dramatically as a result of what forces are assigned and the doctrine employed at that time.

The 2nd Division was an infantry division of the British Army, which was formed numerous times over a 203-year period. Several formations bore the name, the "2nd Division", from 1809 through to the end of the 19th century. The historian Everard Wyrall, the compiler of the division's First World War official history, only included those formations that fought in the Napoleonic Wars, the Crimean War, and the Second Boer War as being linked with the division that was created in the 20th century and fought in the First World War. That modern formation was created in 1902 and would go to further serve in the Second World War. The first 2nd Division that was formed was a mere 3,900 men strong and did not include supporting weapons such as artillery. In comparison, the 2nd Infantry Division, from the Second World War period, was over 18,000 men strong and supported by 72 artillery pieces and numerous other support weapons. Each war that the division fought in has a corresponding order of battle section.

== Napoleonic Wars ==
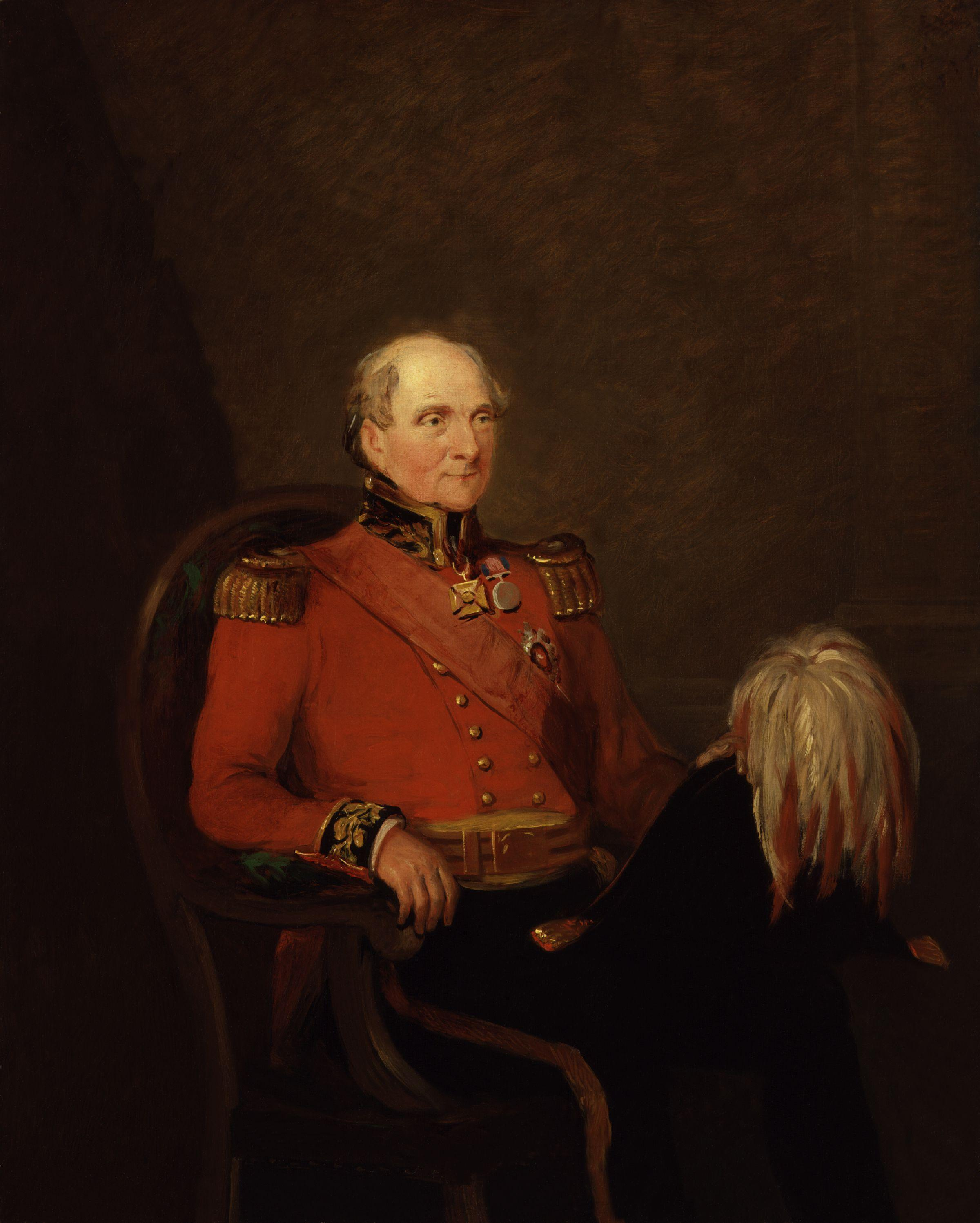
A portrait of the division's first general officer commanding, Rowland Hill, by William Salter

During the Napoleonic Wars (1803–1815), the British Army grew in size. On 18 June 1809, Lieutenant-General Arthur Wellesley, commander of the British forces in Spain and Portugal, ordered the creation of four divisions, including the 2nd Division. During the division's first action of the Peninsular War (the name given to Napoleonic Wars fought in Spain and Portugal), the Battle of Talavera (1809), it was 3,905 men strong. By the next year, it had grown to a strength of 10,677 men. It roughly maintained this strength for the rest of the Peninsular War, and was disbanded when the fighting ended in 1814. It was reformed on 11 April 1815, in the Southern Netherlands (modern-day Belgium), on the resumption of hostilities. It fought at the Battle of Waterloo, where it had a strength of 6,833 men. It then marched into France. Shortly after, the Napoleonic Wars came to a conclusion. The division remained within the restored French kingdom, as part of the British Army of Occupation. In December 1818, the Army of Occupation and the division were disbanded and the troops returned to Britain.

=== Talavera Campaign (July 1809) ===
2nd Division

Christopher Tilson's Brigade:

- 1st Battalion, 3rd Regiment of Foot (The Buffs)
- 2nd Battalion, 48th (the Northamptonshire) Regiment of Foot
- 2nd Battalion, 66th (Berkshire) Regiment of Foot
- One company, 5th Battalion, 60th Regiment of Foot (July 25)

William Stewart's Brigade:

- 29th (Worcestershire) Regiment of Foot
- 1st Battalion, 48th (the Northamptonshire) Regiment of Foot
- 1st Battalion of detachments

=== 1810–1811, including the Battle of Bussaco, the Lines of Torres Vedras, and Battle of Albuera ===
During this period, brigades were referred to by their commander's names. Due to changes in command, the brigade names fluctuated frequently.

2nd Division

The division's 1st brigade:

- 1st Battalion, 3rd Regiment of Foot (The Buffs)
- 2nd Battalion, 31st (Huntingdonshire) Regiment of Foot
- 2nd Battalion, 48th (Northamptonshire) Regiment of Foot
- 2nd Battalion, 66th (Berkshire) Regiment of Foot
- One company, 5th Battalion, 60th Regiment of Foot

The division's 2nd brigade:

- 29th (Worcestershire) Regiment of Foot
- 1st Battalion, 48th (Northamptonshire) Regiment of Foot
- 1st Battalion, 57th (the West Middlesex) Regiment of Foot
- One company, 5th Battalion, 60th Regiment of Foot

The division's 3rd brigade:

- 2nd Battalion, 28th (North Gloucestershire) Regiment of Foot
- 2nd Battalion, 34th (Cumberland) Regiment of Foot
- 2nd Battalion, 39th (Dorsetshire) Regiment of Foot
- One company, 5th Battalion, 60th Regiment of Foot

John Hamilton's Portuguese Division (attached to 2nd Division)

- The division's 1st Brigade:
  - 4th Line Regiment
  - 10th Line Regiment
- The division's 2nd Brigade:
  - 2nd Line Regiment
  - 14th Line Regiment

=== 1813–1814, including the Battle of Vitoria and the Battle of the Pyrenees ===
During this period, brigades were referred to by their commander's names. Due to changes in command, the brigade names fluctuated frequently.

2nd Division

The division's 1st brigade:

- 1st Battalion, 3rd Regiment of Foot (The Buffs)
- 2nd Battalion, 31st (Huntingdonshire) Regiment of Foot
- 1st Battalion, 57th (the West Middlesex) Regiment of Foot
- 2nd Battalion, 66th (Berkshire) Regiment of Foot
- 1st Provisional Battalion of Militia
- One company, 5th Battalion, 60th Regiment of Foot

The division's 2nd brigade:

- 1st Battalion, 50th (West Kent) Regiment of Foot
- 1st Battalion, 71st (Highland) Regiment of Foot (Light Infantry)
- 1st Battalion, 92nd Regiment of Foot (Gordon Highlanders)
- One company, 5th Battalion, 60th Regiment of Foot

The division's 3rd brigade:

- 1st Battalion, 28th (North Gloucestershire) Regiment of Foot
- 2nd Battalion, 34th (Cumberland) Regiment of Foot
- 1st Battalion, 39th (Dorsetshire) Regiment of Foot
- One company, 5th Battalion, 60th Regiment of Foot

Portuguese Brigade (attached):

- 6th Line Regiment
- 18th Line Regiment
- 6th Caçadores

=== Battle of Waterloo (1815) ===
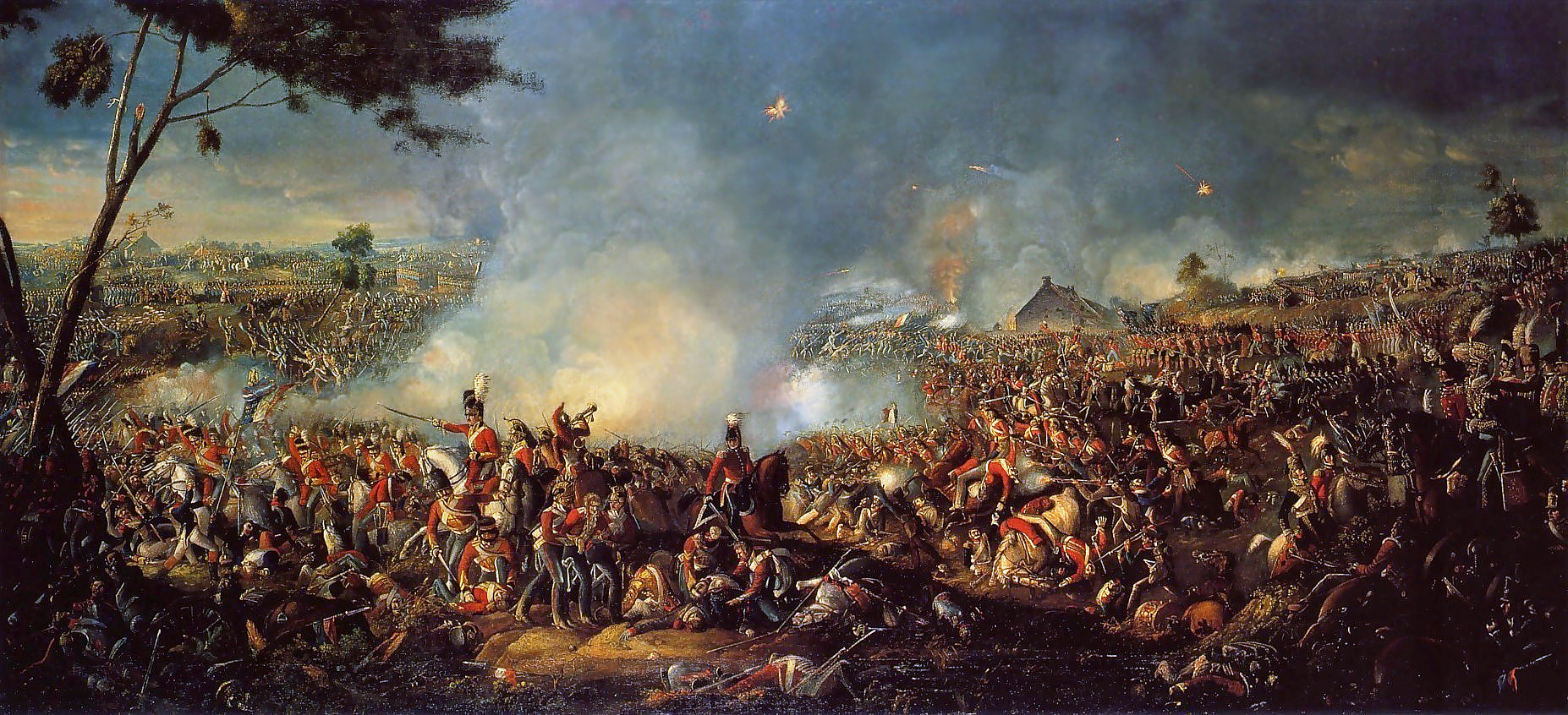
A depiction of the Battle of Waterloo by William Sadler. The painting provides an idea of how the division would have looked, and operated.

2nd Division

3rd British Brigade:

- 1st Battalion, 52nd (Oxfordshire) Light Infantry
- 1st Battalion, 71st (Highland) Light Infantry
- 2nd Battalion, 95th Regiment of Foot (Rifles)
- 3rd Battalion, 95th Regiment of Foot (Rifles)

1st Brigade of the King's German Legion:

- 1st Line Battalion
- 2nd Line Battalion
- 3rd Line Battalion
- 4th Line Battalion

3rd Hanoverian Brigade:

- Landwehr Battalion Bremervörde
- Landwehr Battalion 2nd Duke of York's (Osnabrück)
- Landwehr Battalion 3rd Duke of York's (Quakenbrück)
- Landwehr Battalion Salzgitter

Divisional Artillery:

- No.4 Company, 9th Battalion Royal Artillery
- 1st Horse Battery, King's German Legion

=== Army of Occupation (1815–1818) ===
2nd Division

3rd Brigade:

- 1st Battalion, 52nd (Oxfordshire) Light Infantry
- 1st Battalion, 71st (Highland) Light Infantry (until December 1814)
- 2nd Battalion, 95th Regiment of Foot (Rifles)
- 3rd Battalion, 95th Regiment of Foot (Rifles)

1st Brigade of the King's German Legion (Left December 1814):

- 1st Line Battalion
- 2nd Line Battalion
- 3rd Line Battalion
- 4th Line Battalion

3rd Hanoverian Brigade (Left December 1814):

- Landwehr Battalion Bremervörde
- Landwehr Battalion 2nd Duke of York's (Osnabrück)
- Landwehr Battalion 3rd Duke of York's (Quakenbrück)
- Landwehr Battalion Salzgitter

6th Brigade (joined December 1814):

- 6th (1st Warwickshire) Regiment
- 29th (Worcestershire) Regiment of Foot
- 71st (Highland) Regiment of Foot

Divisional troops:

- 1st Company, 3rd Battalion, Royal Sappers and Miners

== Crimean War ==
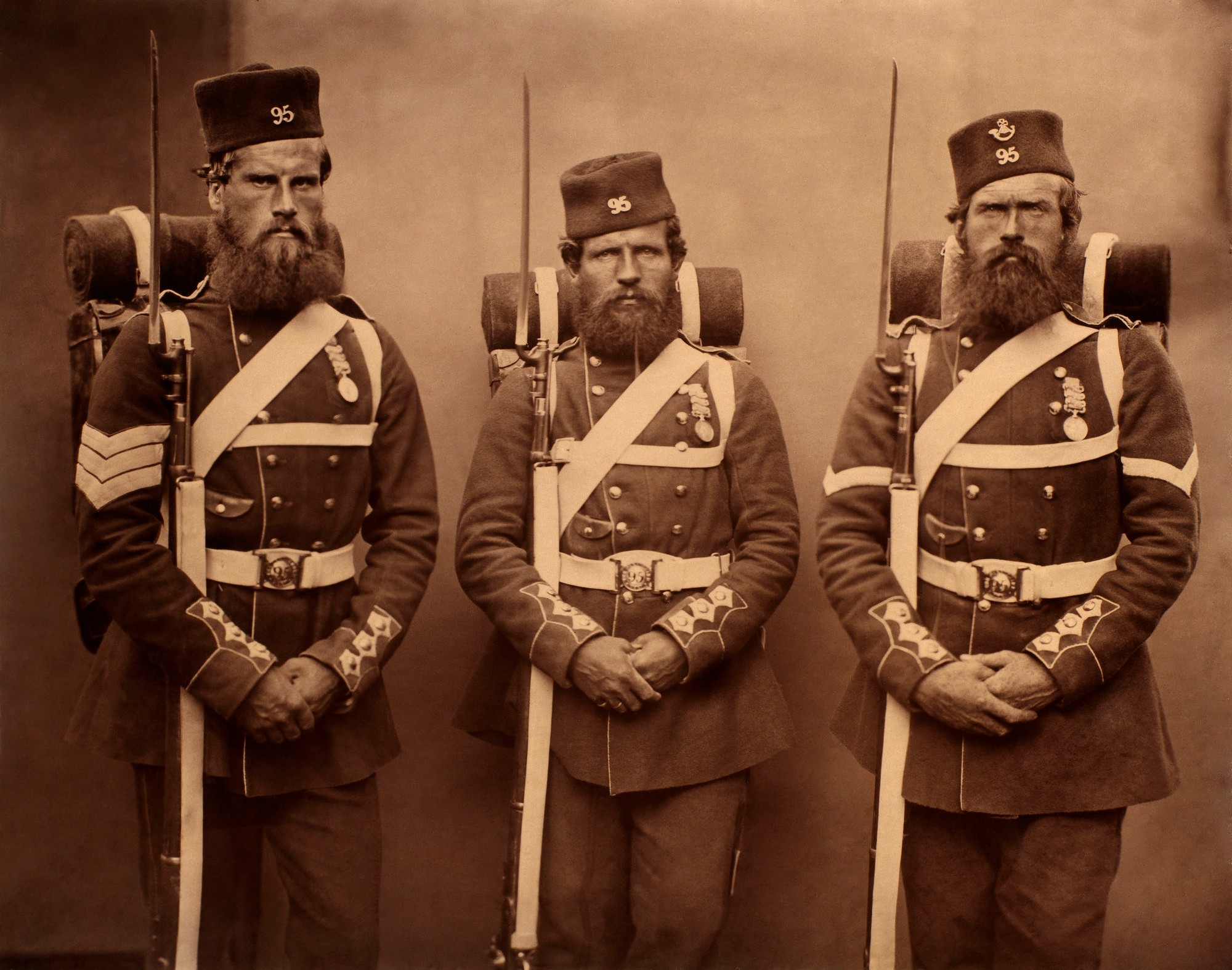
Three members of the 95th (Derbyshire) Regiment of Foot, after their return to the United Kingdom.

In June 1854, a new 2nd Division was formed following the reorganisation of a British expeditionary force that had been dispatched to Ottoman Bulgaria, to support the Ottoman Empire during the early stages of the Crimean War against the Russian Empire. The division proceeded to the Crimea, where it landed on 14 September, and fought throughout the Siege of Sevastopol. During this period, the division numbered around 3,500 men. The division remained in the Crimea until 1856, and demobilised following the conclusion of hostilities.

=== Crimean War (1854–1855) ===
Each division within the expeditionary force to the Crimea had a 1st and a 2nd Brigade.

2nd Division

1st Brigade:

- 30th (Cambridgeshire) Regiment of Foot
- 55th (the Westmorland) Regiment of Foot
- 95th (Derbyshire) Regiment of Foot
- 3rd Regiment of Foot (The Buffs) (not part of the division when it formed, but joined by the end of the war)

2nd Brigade:

- 41st (Welch) Regiment of Foot
- 47th (Lancashire) Regiment of Foot
- 49th (Princess Charlotte of Wales's) (or the Hertfordshire) Regiment of Foot
- 62nd (Wiltshire) Regiment of Foot (not part of the division when it formed, but joined by the end of the war)

Divisional artillery, Royal Artillery:

- R Battery
- G Battery

== Second Boer War ==
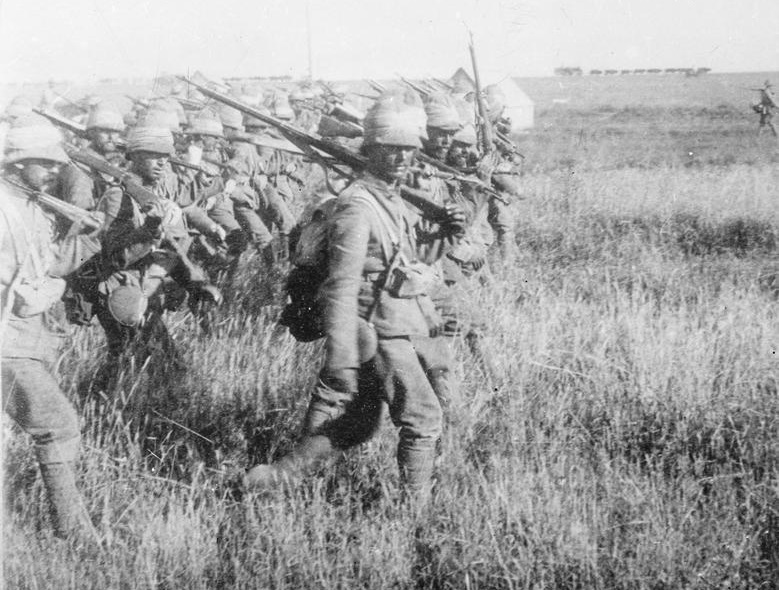
An example of British infantry during the Second Boer War

A new 2nd Division was mobilised in England following the outbreak of the Second Boer War, with the South African Republic and the Orange Free State. It was transported to southern Africa, and fought in the majority of battles related to the Relief of Ladysmith, in the Colony of Natal. It then advanced into the South African Republic, guarded the lines of communication, and was then disbanded by the end of 1900 following the end of conventional warfare.

At the Battle of Colenso, the initial attempt to relieve Ladysmith, the division commanded the majority of British forces in Natal Colony. This force was 16,000 men strong, supported by 44 artillery pieces and 16 machine guns. When it next took the field, on the march towards the Battle of Spion Kop, it was much reduced. The entire force that marched numbered 20,000 men, but this included two divisions, an independent brigade, several batteries of artillery, and various other regiments, squadrons, and companies of cavalry and mounted infantry.

=== On mobilisation in 1899 ===
2nd Division

3rd (Highland) Brigade:

- 1st Battalion, Highland Light Infantry
- 1st Battalion, Argyll and Sutherland Highlanders
- 2nd Battalion, Royal Highlanders (Black Watch)
- 2nd Battalion, Seaforth Highlanders
- Supply Column (Train Company, No. 14)
- Litter Bearer Company, No. 1
- Field Ambulance No. 14

4th Brigade (Light Infantry):

- 1st Battalion, Durham Light Infantry
- 1st Battalion, Rifle Brigade
- 2nd Battalion, Scottish Rifles (Cameronians)
- 3rd Battalion, King's Royal Rifle Corps
- Supply column (Train Company, No. 16)
- Litter Bearer Company, No. 14
- Field Ambulance No. 14

Divisional Troops:

- Divisional artillery, Royal Artillery
  - No. 63 Field Battery
  - No. 64 Field Battery
  - No. 73 Field Battery
  - Ammunition Column
- Field Engineer Company, No. 11
- Supply Column (Train Company, No. 24)
- Field Ambulance No. 3

=== Battle of Colenso (December 1899) ===
2nd Division

2nd Brigade:

- 2nd Battalion, East Surrey Regiment
- 2nd Battalion, West Yorkshire Regiment
- 2nd Battalion, Devonshire Regiment
- 2nd Battalion, The Queen's (Royal West Surrey) Regiment

4th Brigade:

- 1st Battalion, Durham Light Infantry
- 1st Battalion, Rifle Brigade
- 2nd Battalion, Scottish Rifles (Cameronians)
- 3rd Battalion, King's Royal Rifle Corps
- No. 14 Field Hospital

5th Brigade:

- 1st Battalion, Connaught Rangers
- 1st Battalion, Royal Dublin Fusiliers
- 1st Battalion, Royal Inniskilling Fusiliers
- 1st Battalion, King's Own Scottish Borderers
- No. 10 Field Hospital
- No. 16 Bearer Company

6th Brigade:

- 1st Battalion, Royal Welsh Fusiliers
- 2nd Battalion, Royal Irish Fusiliers
- 2nd Battalion, Royal Scots Fusiliers
- 2nd Battalion, Royal Fusiliers
- Unidentified Field Hospital

Divisional Troops:

- 12 companies of mounted infantry
- 2nd Battalion, Somerset Light Infantry
- 2nd Battalion, King's Royal Rifles
- 1st Battalion, Gordon Highlanders
- Divisional artillery, Royal Artillery
  - No. 7 Field Battery
  - No. 14 Field Battery
  - No. 64 Field Battery
  - No. 66 Field Battery
  - No. 73 Field Battery
- Detachment of naval guns
- 12th Field Company, Royal Engineers
- Ammunition Column
- No. 3 Field Hospital

=== Spion Kop campaign (January 1900) ===
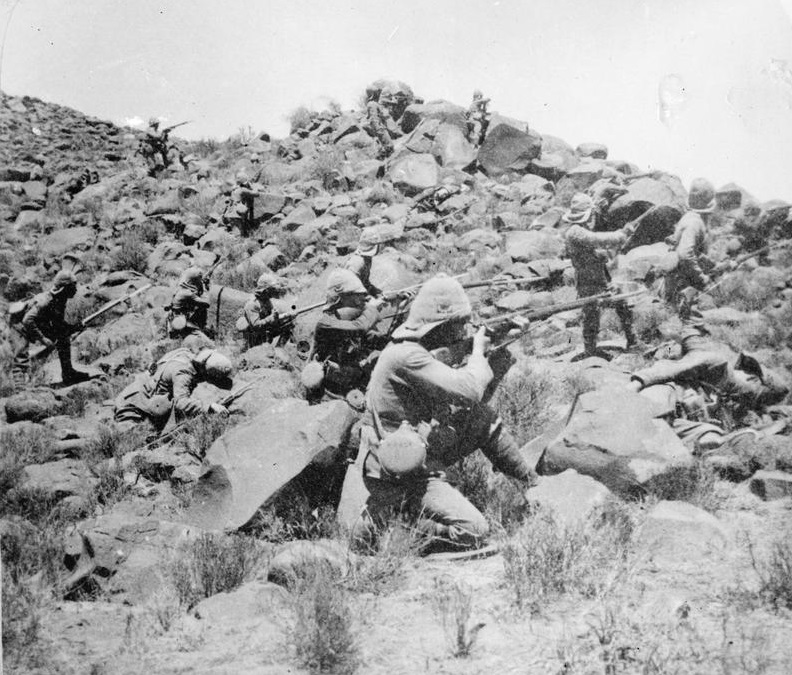
An example of a British infantry during the Second Boer War

2nd Division

2nd Brigade:

- 2nd Battalion, East Surrey Regiment
- 2nd Battalion, West Yorkshire Regiment
- 2nd Battalion, Devonshire Regiment
- 2nd Battalion, The Queen's (Royal West Surrey) Regiment

5th Brigade:

- 1st Battalion, Connaught Rangers
- 1st Battalion, Royal Dublin Fusiliers
- 1st Battalion, Royal Inniskilling Fusiliers
- 1st Battalion, King's Own Scottish Borderers

Divisional Troops:

- Divisional artillery, Royal Artillery
  - No. 19 Field Battery
  - No. 28 Field Battery
  - No. 63 Field Battery
- One squadron from the 13th Hussars
- Royal Engineers

=== February 1900 – end of 1900 ===
2nd Division

2nd Brigade:

- 2nd Battalion, East Surrey Regiment
- 2nd Battalion, West Yorkshire Regiment
- 2nd Battalion, Devonshire Regiment
- 2nd Battalion, The Queen's (Royal West Surrey) Regiment

4th Brigade:

- 1st Battalion, Durham Light Infantry
- 1st Battalion, Rifle Brigade
- 2nd Battalion, Scottish Rifles (Cameronians)
- 3rd Battalion, King's Royal Rifle Corps

Divisional Troops:

- Divisional artillery, Royal Artillery
  - No. 7 Field Battery
  - No. 14 Field Battery
  - No. 66 Field Battery
  - Divisional Ammunition Column
- One squadron from the 13th Hussars
- 17th Company, Royal Engineers

== First World War ==
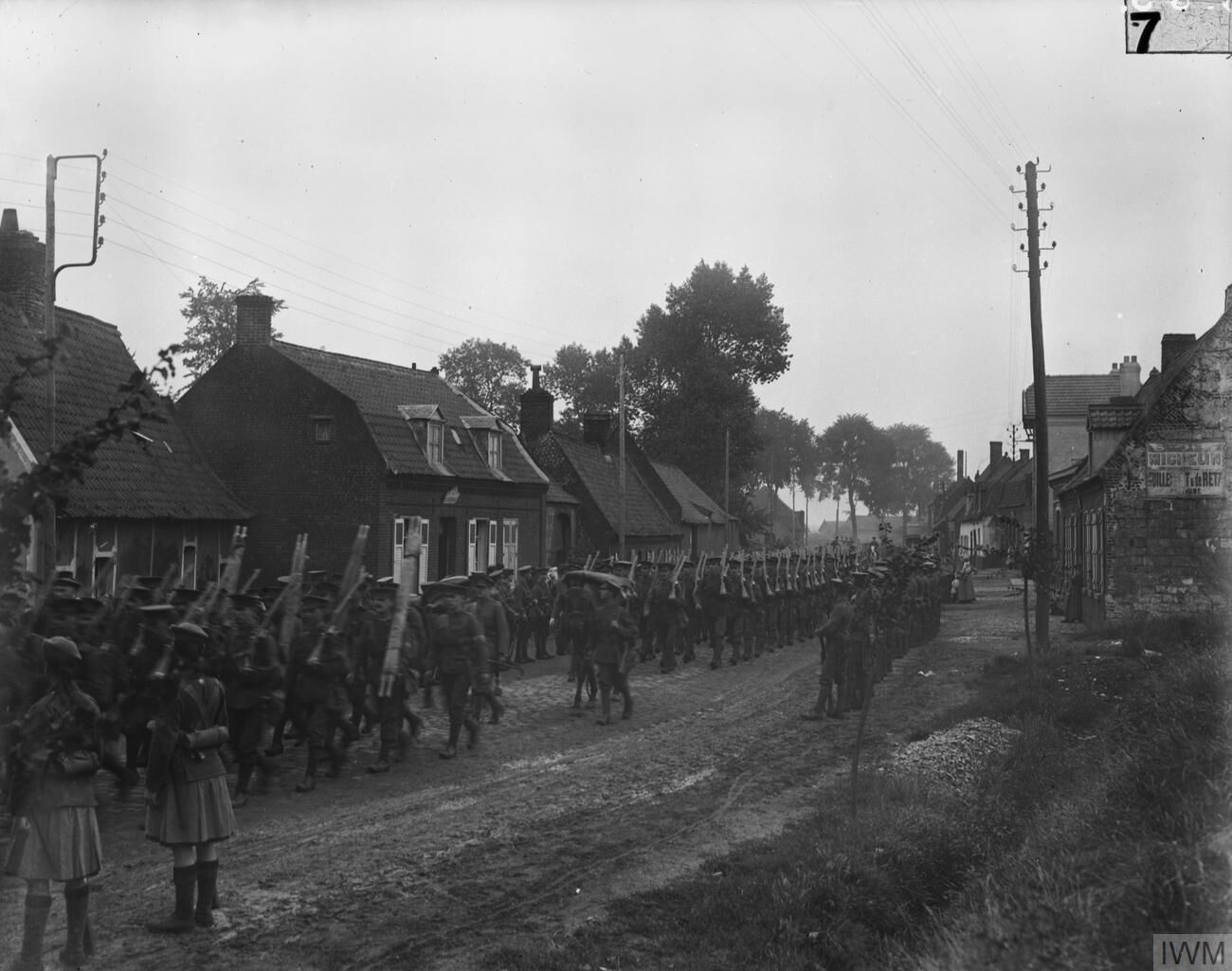
Elements of the 2nd Division, the 1st Battalion Irish Guards, march through a French village during 1915.

On 28 July 1914, the First World War began. On 4 August, Germany invaded Belgium and the United Kingdom entered the war against the German Empire. The division soon after deployed to France, as part of the British Expeditionary Force, and it then served on the Western Front between 1914 and 1918.

The war establishment, the on-paper strength, of an infantry division in 1914 was 18,179 men, 5,594 horses, 18 motor vehicles, 76 pieces of artillery, and 24 machine guns. While there was a small change to the number of men and horses in a division in 1915, the main change was the decrease in artillery pieces to 48 and an increase in motor vehicles to 54. The establishment in 1916 increased the division size to 19,372 men, 5,145 horses, 61 motor vehicles, 64 artillery pieces, 40 trench mortars, and 200 machine guns. The 1917 changes saw a decrease to 18,825 men, 4,342 horses, 57 motor vehicles, and 48 artillery pieces, although the number of trench mortars remained the same, and the number of machine guns increased to 264. By 1918, the number of front line infantry within the British Army in France had decreased because of casualties and a lack of eligible replacements, and this had led to a manpower crisis. To consolidate manpower and to increase the ratio of machine guns and artillery support available to the infantry, the number of battalions in a division was reduced from twelve to nine. This resulted in the 1918 establishment of 16,035 men, 3,838 horses, 79 motor vehicles, 48 artillery pieces, 36 trench mortars, and 400 machine guns.

=== First World War (1914–1918) ===
2nd Division

4th (Guards) Brigade (until 19 August 1915):

- 2nd Battalion, Grenadier Guards
- 2nd Battalion, Coldstream Guards
- 3rd Battalion, Coldstream Guards
- 1st Battalion, Irish Guards
- 1/1st Battalion, Hertfordshire Regiment (from 20 November 1914

5th Brigade:

- 2nd Battalion, Worcestershire Regiment (until 15 December 1915)
- 2nd Battalion, Oxfordshire and Buckinghamshire Light Infantry
- 2nd Battalion, Highland Light Infantry
- 2nd Battalion, Connaught Rangers (until 26 November 1914)
- 1/9th Battalion (Glasgow Highlanders), Highland Light Infantry (from 23 November 1914, until 30 January 1916)
- 2nd Battalion, Royal Inniskilling Fusiliers (26 January 1915, until 20 July 1915)
- 1st Battalion, Queen's Royal Regiment (West Surrey) (12 July 1915, until 15 December 1915)
- 1/7th Battalion, King's (Liverpool Regiment) (from 4 September, until 11 November 1915)
- 17th (Service) Battalion, Royal Fusiliers (Empire) (from 13 December 1915, until 6 February 1918)
- 24th (Service) Battalion, Royal Fusiliers (2nd Sportsmen's) (from 13 December 1915)
- 5th Brigade Machine Gun Company, Machine Gun Corps (formed 1 January 1916, until 3 March 1918)
- 5th Trench Mortar Battery (formed 11 March 1916)

6th Brigade:

- 1st Battalion, King's (Liverpool Regiment)
- 2nd Battalion, South Staffordshire Regiment
- 1st Battalion, Royal Berkshire Regiment (until 13 December 1915)
- 1st Battalion, King's Royal Rifle Corps (until 13 December 1915)
- 1/5th Battalion, King's (Liverpool Regiment) (from 22 February 1915, until 15 December 1915)
- 1/7th Battalion, King's (Liverpool Regiment) (12 March 1915 to 3 September 1915)
- 1/1st Battalion, Hertfordshire Regiment (from 19 August 1915, until 28 February 1916)
- 13th (Service) Battalion, Essex Regiment (West Ham) (from 22 December 1915, disbanded on 10 February 1918)
- 17th (Service) Battalion, Middlesex Regiment (1st Football) (from 8 December 1915, disbanded 10 February 1918)
- 17th (Service) Battalion, Royal Fusiliers (Empire) (from 5th Bde 6 February 1918)
- 6th Brigade Machine Gun Company, Machine Gun Corps (formed 4 January 1916, until 3 March 1918)
- 6th Trench Mortar Battery (formed 18 March 1916)

19th Brigade (19 August 1915, until 25 November 1915):

- 2nd Battalion, Royal Welch Fusiliers
- 1st Battalion, Cameronians (Scottish Rifles)
- 1st Battalion, Middlesex Regiment
- 2nd Battalion, Argyll and Sutherland Highlanders
- 1/5th Battalion, Cameronians (Scottish Rifles)

99th Brigade (from 25 November 1915:

- 17th (Service) Battalion, Royal Fusiliers (Empire) (to 5th Bde 12 December 1915)
- 22nd (Service) Battalion, Royal Fusiliers (Kensington) (disbanded 2 February 1918)
- 23rd (Service) Battalion, Royal Fusiliers (1st Sportsmen's)
- 24th (Service) Battalion, Royal Fusiliers (2nd Sportsman's) (to 5th Bde 12 December 1915)
- 1st Battalion, Royal Berkshire Regiment (from 13 December 1915)
- 1st Battalion, King's Royal Rifle Corps (from 13 December 1915)
- 99th Brigade Machine Gun Company, Machine Gun Corps (from 28 April 1916, until 3 March 1918)
- 99th Trench Mortar Battery (formed 18 March 1916)

The divisional insignia adopted by the division during the First World War.

Divisional Mounted Troops:

- B Squadron, 15th The King's Hussars (until 14 April 1915)
- B Squadron, South Irish Horse (from 2 May 1915, until 10 May 1916)
- 2nd Cyclist Company (until 10 May 1916)

Divisional Artillery:

- XXXIV Brigade, Royal Field Artillery (until 25 January 1917)
  - 22nd Battery (until 4 February 1915)
  - 50th Battery
  - 70th Battery
  - 56th (Howitzer) Battery (from 26 March 1916)
  - D (Howitzer) Battery (from 16 November 1916)
  - XXXIV Brigade, Brigade Ammunition Column
- XXXVI Brigade, Royal Field Artillery
  - 15th Battery
  - 48th Battery
  - 71st Battery
  - D (Howitzer) Battery (from 26 March 1916)
  - XXXIV Brigade, Brigade Ammunition Column
- XLI Brigade, Royal Field Artillery
  - 9th Battery
  - 16th Battery
  - 17th Battery
  - 47th (Howitzer) Battery (from 26 March 1916)
- XLIV (Howitzer) Brigade, Royal Field Artillery (broken up on 26 March 1916)
  - 47th (Howitzer) Battery
  - 56th (Howitzer) Battery
  - 60th (Howitzer) Battery (until 23 June 1915)
  - XLIV (Howitzer) Brigade, Brigade Ammunition Column
- 25th Heavy Battery, Royal Garrison Artillery (until April 1915)
  - 25th Heavy Battery Ammunition Column
- X.2 Medium Trench Mortar Battery, Royal Field Artillery (formed by April 1916)
- Y.2 Medium Trench Mortar Battery, Royal Field Artillery (formed by April 1916)
- Z.2 Medium Trench Mortar Battery, Royal Field Artillery (formed by April 1916, until 24 February 1918 when distributed between X and Y batteries)
- V.2 Heavy Trench Mortar Battery, Royal Garrison Artillery (formed 26 May 1916, until 3 January 1918)
- 2nd Divisional Ammunition Column

Divisional Engineers, Royal Engineers:

- 5th Field Company
- 11th Field Company (until 2 December 1915)
- 226th Field Company (from 2 December 1915)
- 1st East Anglian Field Company (from 5 January 1915; later renamed 483rd (East Anglian) Field Company)
- 2nd Divisional Signal Company

Divisional Pioneers:

- 10th Battalion, Duke of Cornwall's Light Infantry (joined 23 June 1916)

Divisional Machine Guns:

- 242nd Machine Gun Company (joined 18 July 1917)
- No. 2 Battalion, Machine Gun Corps (formed on 3 March 1918)
  - 5th Machine Gun Company
  - 6th Machine Gun Company
  - 99th Machine Gun Company
  - 242nd Machine Gun Company

Divisional Medical Services, Royal Army Medical Corps:

- 4th Field Ambulance (until 19 August 1915)
- 5th Field Ambulance
- 6th Field Ambulance
- 19th Field Ambulance (until 25 November 1915)
- 100th Field Ambulance (from 25 November 1915)

Divisional Veterinary Services, Army Veterinary Corps:

- 3rd Mobile Veterinary Section

Divisional Services, Army Service Corps:

- 2nd Divisional Train
  - 11th Company (until 19 August 1915)
  - 28th Company
  - 31st Company
  - 35th Company
  - 8th Company (from 19 August 1915, until 25 November 1915)
  - 172nd Company (from 25 November 1915)
- 7th Divisional Employment Company (joined 18 May 1917, renumbered 205th in June 1917)

== Second World War ==
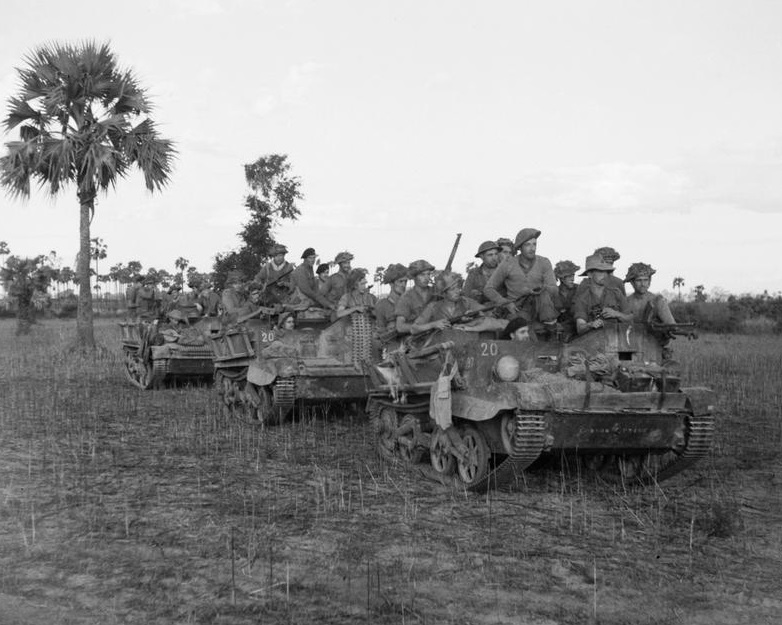
Elements of the division on patrol in universal carriers

In 1939, following the German invasion of Poland, the United Kingdom declared war in support of the latter and entered the Second World War. The division, now styled as an infantry division, saw combat in France in 1940. After the British Army's defeat, the division returned to and defended the United Kingdom. It was then transferred to India, following the Empire of Japan's entry into the war. The division then fought in India and Burma in 1944 and 1945.

The war establishment of an infantry division in 1939 was 13,863 men, 2,993 vehicles, 72 artillery pieces, 48 anti-tank guns, 361 anti-tank rifles, 126 mortars, and 700 machine guns. In 1941, the war establishment was changed to 17,298 men, 4,166 vehicles, 72 artillery pieces, 48 anti-tanks guns, 444 anti-tank rifles, 48 anti-aircraft guns, 218 mortars, and 867 machine guns. From 1944, the establishment was updated to 18,347 men, 4,330 vehicles, 72 artillery pieces, 110 anti-tank guns, 436 other anti-tank weapons, 359 mortars, and 1,302 machine guns.

=== Second World War (1939–1945) ===
2nd Infantry Division

4th Infantry Brigade (detached between 26 July 1944 and 19 September 1944):

- 1st Battalion, Royal Scots (until 3 November 1943, and then from 3 July 1943)
- 2nd Battalion, Royal Norfolk Regiment
- 1st Battalion, Border Regiment (until 4 May 1940)
- 4th Infantry Brigade Anti-Tank Company (until 14 December 1940)
- 1/8th Battalion, Lancashire Fusiliers (from 4 May 1940)

5th Infantry Brigade (detached between 19 July 1944, until 8 August 1944):

- 2nd Battalion, Royal Warwickshire Regiment (left 5 February 1940)
- 2nd Battalion, Dorsetshire Regiment
- 1st Battalion, Queen's Own Cameron Highlanders
- 5th Infantry Brigade Anti-Tank Company (until 14 December 1940)
- 7th Battalion, Worcestershire Regiment (from 2 May 1940)

6th Infantry Brigade (until 31 October 1942; then from 1 June 1943 until 18 April 1945):

- 1st Battalion, Royal Welch Fusiliers
- 1st Battalion, Royal Berkshire Regiment
- 2nd Battalion, Durham Light Infantry (detached between 9 September 1941 and 19 October 1941)
- 6th Infantry Brigade Anti-Tank Company (from 3 September 1939, until 14 December 1940)
- 1st Battalion, East Lancashire Regiment (from 9 September 1941, until 19 October 1941)

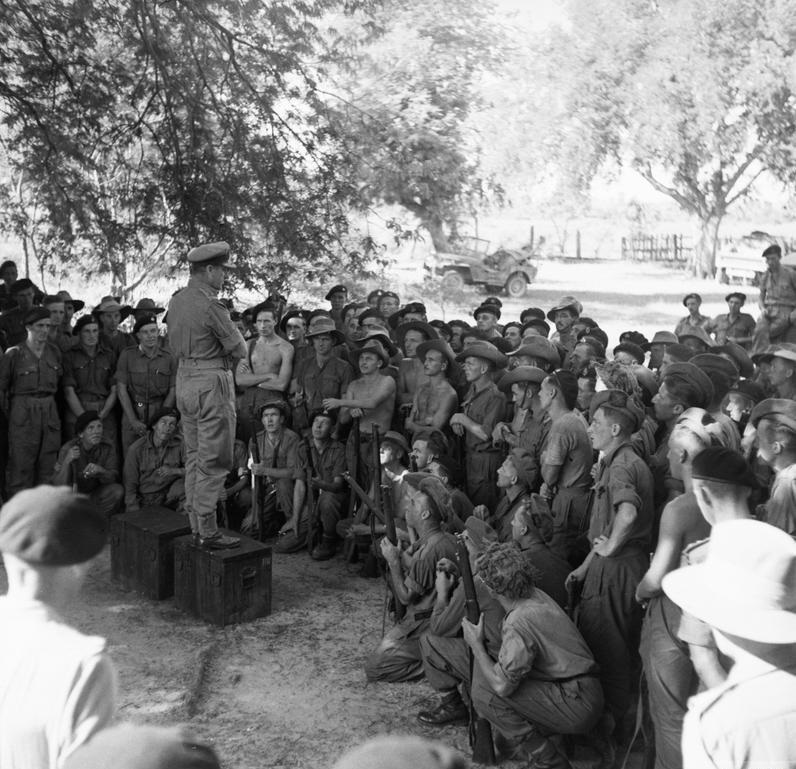
Elements of the division gather around to listen to Louis Mountbatten, the supreme commander in South East Asia, talk.

Divisional Troops:

- 2nd Divisional artillery, Royal Artillery
  - 10th Field Regiment (until 5 April 1943, and then from 6 July 1943)
  - 16th Field Regiment
  - 18th Field Regiment (until 1 February 1940)
  - 99th (Buckinghamshire Yeomanry) Field Regiment (from 1 February 1940)
  - 13th Anti-Tank Regiment (until 2 July 1942)
  - 100th (8th Gordon Highlanders) Anti-Tank Regiment (from 18 March 1943; between 1 December 1943 and 30 September 1944 this was a mixed Light Anti-Aircraft/Anti-Tank Regiment)
  - 89th Light Anti-Aircraft Regiment (from 24 January 1942, until 24 March 1942)
  - 60th Light Anti-Aircraft Regiment (from 18 April 1943, until 15 July 1943)
- 2nd Divisional engineers, Royal Engineers
  - 5th Field Company
  - 11th Field Company (until 4 May 1940)
  - 38th Field Company (until 29 January 1940)
  - 506th Field Company (from 29 January 1940, until 31 October 1942; then from 1 June 1943, until 18 April 1945)
  - 208th (Sussex) Field Company (from 4 May 1940)
  - 21st Field Park Company
- 2nd Divisional Signals, Royal Corps of Signals
- Divisional reconnaissance (Note: In June 1942, the Reconnaissance Corps universally adopted cavalry nomenclature. As a result, all battalions were redesignated as regiments.)
  - 2nd Battalion, Reconnaissance Corps (from 30 April 1941; renamed 2nd Reconnaissance Regiment on 6 June 1942; became the 2nd Reconnaissance Regiment. Royal Armoured Corps on 1 January 1944)
- 2nd Battalion, Manchester Regiment – (Machine Gun Battalion)
- 4th/7th Royal Dragoon Guards (until 31 May 1940)
- 3rd Carabiniers (Prince of Wales's Dragoon Guards) (attached 28 January 1945, until 7 April 1945)

== See also ==
- List of Victoria Cross recipients from the British 2nd Division
- List of commanders of the British 2nd Division
