= John Wilsey =

British Army general (1939–2019)

General Sir John Wilsey GCB CBE DL
- Born: 18 February 1939
- Died: 25 September 2019 (aged 80)
- Relatives: John Harold Owen Wilsey (father)
- Military career
- Allegiance: United Kingdom
- Branch: British Army
- Service years: 1959–1996
- Rank: General
- Nickname: Gregory Peck
- Service number: 461522
- Unit: Devonshire and Dorset Regiment
- Commands: Land Command; UK Land Forces; Northern Ireland; 1st Infantry Brigade; 1st Battalion, Devonshire and Dorset Regiment
- Conflicts: Operation Banner
- Awards: Knight Grand Cross of the Order of the Bath; Commander of the Order of the British Empire; Mentioned in Despatches
- Other work: Author

General Sir John Finlay Willasey Wilsey, GCB, CBE, DL (18 February 1939 – 25 September 2019) was a British Army officer who served as Commander-in-Chief, Land Forces.

== Army career ==
Educated at Sherborne School, John Wilsey was commissioned into the Devonshire and Dorset Regiment in 1959. He served in Northern Ireland between 1976 and 1977, where he was mentioned in despatches. In 1978 he attended the Staff College, Camberley. He was commanding officer of the 1st Battalion Devonshire and Dorset Regiment from 1979 to 1982. He commanded the 1st Infantry Brigade from 1984 to 1986, was chief of staff UK Land Forces from 1988 to 1989, and made Colonel Commandant of the Army Catering Corps in 1990. He was also given the colonelcy of the Devonshire and Dorset Regiment in 1990, holding the position until 1998.

Wilsey went on to become General Officer Commanding Northern Ireland from 1990 to 1993. It was in this capacity that he oversaw the merger between the Ulster Defence Regiment and the Royal Irish Rangers to form the Royal Irish Regiment. In 1993 he was appointed Joint Commander of Operations in the Former Republic of Yugoslavia, and relinquished his post over the Army Catering Corps in favour of the position of Colonel Commandant of the Royal Logistic Corps. In 1994 he was appointed Aide de Camp General to the Queen.

Wilsey served as the last Commander in Chief, UK Land Forces from 1993 to 1995, with the acting rank of general, and was then the first Commander-in-Chief, Land Command from 1995 to 1996. He was appointed a Knight Grand Cross of the Order of the Bath in the 1996 New Year Honours.

== Later career ==
Wilsey was the author of H. Jones VC: The Life and Death of an Unusual Hero, a book about his friend Lieutenant Colonel H. Jones who was killed in the Falklands War. He also became Chairman of Western Provident Association and Vice-Chairman of the Commonwealth War Graves Commission.

Having settled in southern Wiltshire, in July 1996 he was appointed a Deputy Lieutenant of the county.

He died on 25 September 2019 at the age of 80.

Military offices
Preceded by Sir John Waters	General Officer Commanding the British Army in Northern Ireland; 1990–1993	Succeeded by Sir Roger Wheeler
Preceded by Sir John Waters	Commander in Chief, UK Land Forces; 1993–1995	Post discontinued
New command	Commander-in-Chief, Land Command; 1995–1996	Succeeded by Sir Roger Wheeler
