= No. 52 Wing RAF =

No. 52 Wing RAF
- Country: United Kingdom
- Branch: Royal Air Force
- Size: Wing

No. 52 Wing RAF was a wing of the Royal Air Force during the Second World War. 52 Wing composed No. 59 and 53 Squadrons in France from October 1939 until May 1940. They were stationed in Poix until returning to the UK. Both units flew the Bristol Blenheim Mk. IV bomber on reconnaissance sorties in the Air Component of the British Expeditionary Force (BEF) and later under BAFF (British Air Forces in France).

== See also ==
- List of Wings of the Royal Air Force
