= British Air Forces in France =

British air force command in France during World War II

British Air Forces in France (BAFF) was a Royal Air Force (RAF) Command set up on 15 January 1940 led by Air Marshal Arthur Barratt, to provide unified command of the RAF in France. When the British Expeditionary Force (BEF) went to France, the Royal Air Force Component of the British Expeditionary Force (Air Component, Air Vice-Marshal Charles Blount) accompanied the BEF for air support and the Advanced Air Striking Force (AASF, Air Vice-Marshal Patrick Playfair) the squadrons of 1 Group, Bomber Command, moved to airfields in eastern France for independent operations. Barratt was charged by the Air Ministry with giving "full assurance" to the BEF to provide it with "...such bomber squadrons as the latter may, in consultation with him, consider necessary from time to time."

Since the British held only a small part of the Western Front, Barratt had to operate in the context of the immediate needs of the Allies. In France the new arrangement worked well but the War Office and the Air Ministry never agreed on what support should be given to the BEF.

The AASF consisted of the light bomber squadrons of 1 Group and three squadrons of Hurricanes, based around Rheims to be within range of the Ruhr, should the political decision be taken to begin strategic bombing. No decision had been taken before Fall Gelb (Case Yellow), the German offensive in the west, began on 10 May 1940. The AASF bomber force was used instead against the German Army and its lines of communication. BAFF could also request Bomber Command to provide support from medium bombers based in Britain. The headquarters of BAFF were at Chauny next to those of François d'Astier de La Vigerie, the French air commander, for optimum co-operation between the BAFF and the Armée de l'Air. BAFF HQ moved to Coulommiers, thence to Château Reze, Pornic on 16 June; AASF HQ was based at Château Polignac near Reims and moved to Troyes on 15 May, Muides near Blois on 3 June and Nantes on 10 June. The Air Component HQ was based at Marœuil and moved to Arras on 9 May, Hazebrouck on 16 May and returned to England on 21/22 May. The French High Command do not seem to have attempted direct communication with BAFF. General Edward Spears (Churchill's Personal Representative to the French Prime Minister) reported on 6 June that Weygand (commander in chief of the French army from 20 May) had never met or spoken to Barratt.

== 10–21 May ==
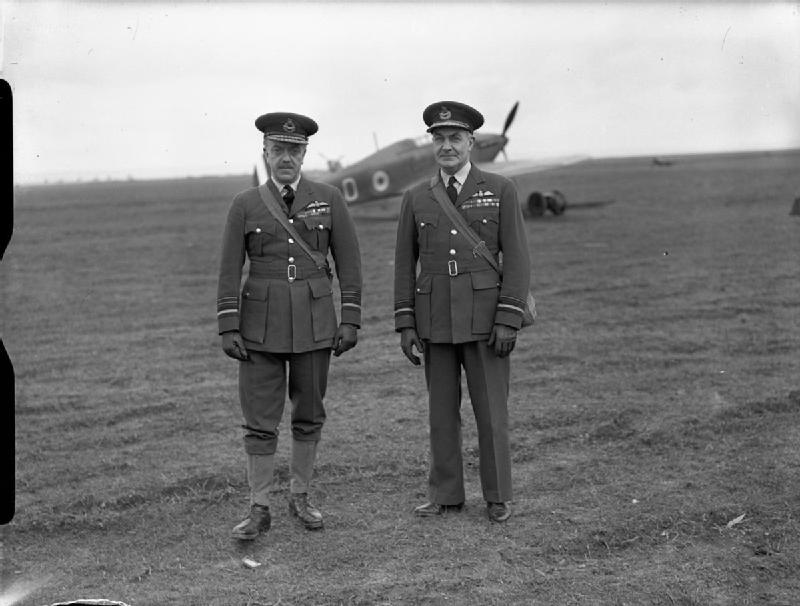
Air Marshal Arthur Barratt, Air Officer Commanding British Air Forces in France and Air Vice-Marshal Patrick Playfair, Air Officer Commanding the Advanced Air Striking Force, at Rouvres in late 1939 or early 1940.

BAFF was reinforced by four Hurricane squadrons as planned. The operational instructions issued by BAFF were,

Bomber aircraft have proved extremely useful in support of an advancing army, especially against weak anti-aircraft resistance, but it is not clear that a bomber force used against an advancing army well supported by all forms of anti-aircraft defence and a large force of fighter aircraft, will be economically effective.

The AASF, when used against German troops and bridges, suffered many losses from faulty tactics in the face of the large numbers of Luftwaffe fighters and highly effective light anti-aircraft units protecting the bridges. By the end of 12 May, the number of serviceable bombers with the AASF had been reduced to 72 from 135. The War Cabinet meeting that evening were warned by the Chief of the Air Staff Cyril Newall that the bomber losses had been disproportionate to the results achieved. On 14 May, the AASF made a maximum effort against pontoon bridges thrown across the Meuse at Sedan and lost 40 out of 71 aircraft.

German air superiority led to more Hurricane squadrons. At the request of BAFF and the BEF, the equivalent of another two squadrons joined the Air Component on 13 May but this was only after much discussion by the Chiefs of Staff Committee and the War Cabinet. The Chiefs of Staff Committee, meeting in the morning had advised that no further air support could be given on the Continent without unduly weakening the defence of Britain. Churchill, chairing the meeting, asked them to consider further what could be done and raised the matter again at the War Cabinet that evening. (Note: Having given his "blood, toil, tears, and sweat" speech to the House of Commons.) The Secretary of State for Air, Sir Archibald Sinclair, warned that whereas the Air Staff had estimated that 60 fighter squadrons were needed adequately to defend Britain, there were only 39. Churchill later complained of inconsistency of statistics supplied by the Air Staff. Churchill then accepted that it was not possible to send large numbers of fighters to France.

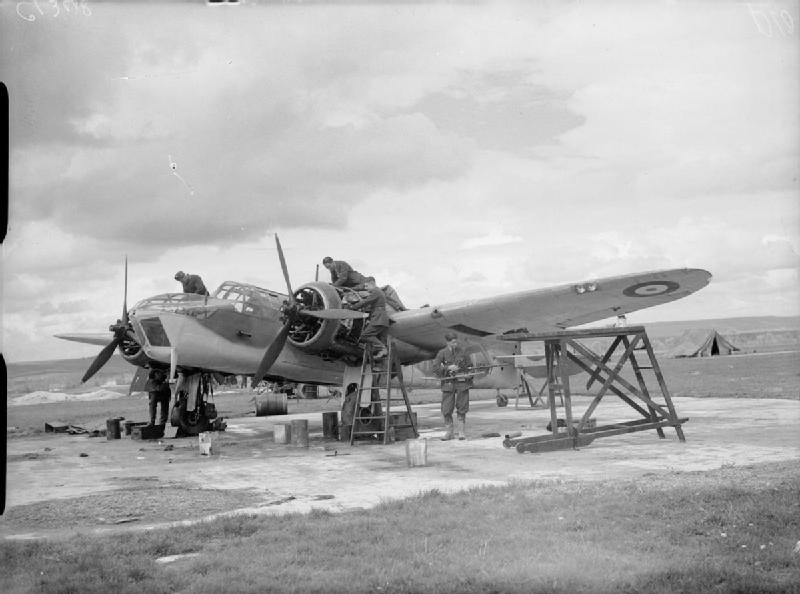
An AASF Bristol Blenheim Mark IV of 139 Squadron, undergoes maintenance at Plivot in the Marne department.

On 14 May, the French Government requested another ten squadrons. (Note: Gort had similarly asked for more fighter squadrons.) This request was discussed first at the Chiefs of Staff Committee and then at War Cabinet; both decided against taking any immediate action. The Chiefs of Staff Committee of 15 May discussed the matter again; accepted the advice of Air Chief Marshal Hugh Dowding (Air Officer Commanding RAF Fighter Command ) that sending more fighters would not achieve decisive results in France but would leave Fighter Command too weak to defend Britain and decided against any further reinforcement. That of 16 May had a message from General Maurice Gamelin, asking for ten fighter squadrons at once; if they did not come the battle would be lost. It reconsidered the matter and advised sending eight 'flights' (half-squadrons). This was discussed and agreed at War Cabinet; Churchill wanted to send more squadrons but Sinclair advised that four squadrons was a maximum and even this was a very serious risk, taken contrary to the advice offered by Dowding.

Churchill flew to Paris for discussions with the French Government and High Command. The discussion was acrimonious, with the French pressing for the full ten squadrons. Churchill urged the need to retain fighters to defend Britain and doubted if six more fighter squadrons would make a difference. The French disagreed, Édouard Daladier (the French minister for defence) asserting that air cover would give French infantry the confidence needed to fight tanks. The French prime minister Paul Reynaud said the Allies had to choose between two risks, leaving English factories without fighter protection, like the French ones or seeing the Germans continue to advance on Paris. Churchill telegraphed the War Cabinet to explain that the situation was "grave in the last degree". (Note: This is the meeting at which, after Gamelin had explained where and in what strength the Germans had broken through. Churchill said, "Ou est la masse de manoeuvre?" and was told 'with a shake of the head and a shrug' "Aucune". Churchill says that in the garden of the Quai d'Orsay files were being burned on bonfires, in preparation for the evacuation of Paris.) Churchill wrote in a telegram from Paris,

I personally feel that we should send squadrons of fighters demanded...and... dominate the air above the Bulge (Churchill's optimistic name for the area of the German breakthrough) for the next two or three days, not for any local purpose but to give the last chance to the French Army to rally its bravery and strength. It would not be good historically if their requests were denied, and their ruin resulted...

— Paris telegram No. 206D1PP, by telephone, 16 May 1940

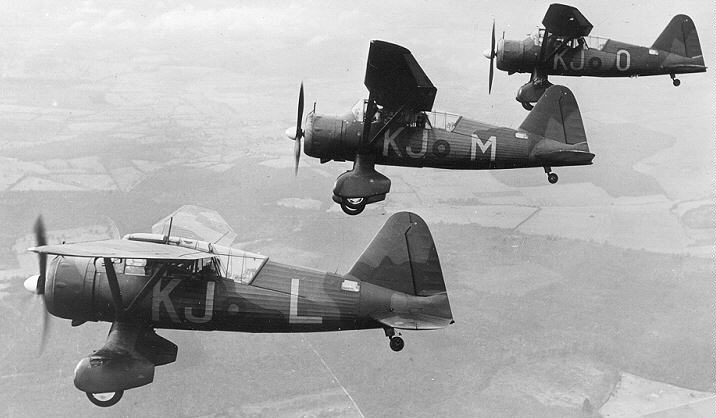
A flight of Lysander reconnaissance aircraft

The War Cabinet, faced with this, agreed to the French demand. Newall warned that there were only six complete Hurricane squadrons left in Britain and/or advised that Air Component bases could only accommodate another three squadrons. It was agreed that these squadrons were to fly to forward bases in the north of France each day; three in the morning, three in the afternoon. This brought the number of fighter squadrons in the Air Component up to thirteen.

AASF bases and the BAFF headquarters were somewhat to the south of the German advance from Sedan to the Channel coast; the Air Component bases mostly north of it. By 17 May, the landline communications between BAFF and the Air Component had been lost and thereafter the Air Component operated as directed by Lord Gort and the Air Ministry. The German advance up the Channel coast overran Air Component bases and the Air Component evacuated to southern England from 19 to 21 May, becoming the Back Component. Of the 261 fighters that had operated with the component, only 66 returned to England; 120 of the lost aircraft had suffered damage which under normal circumstances would have been repairable.

== 22 May – 22 June ==
Aircraft production, 19 May to 1 June
Type	Built	Lost
Hurricane	151	119
Spitfire	39	75
All types	453	436

The Air Component, now the Back Component, no longer controlled any combat aircraft but its headquarters was used to co-ordinate RAF operations from English bases in support of the BEF and the Dunkirk evacuation. During the nine days of the evacuation, over 2,700 fighter sorties were flown. The AASF and Barratt remained in France, retreating first to the Troyes area (16 May), then to the Orléans—Le Mans area (3 June). The provision of further reinforcements was discussed at the highest political levels, referred to by Churchill in his "This was their finest hour" speech of 18 June. On 3 June, the War Cabinet discussed what the policy should be on sending more fighter squadrons to support the French. They accepted the advice of the Chiefs of Staff Committee that no more than six bomber squadrons and three fighter squadrons should be based in France. (Note: The current establishment of the AASF.) Dowding supported this by noting that serviceable fighter strength in Britain was 224 Hurricanes and 280 Spitfires, warning that if the Germans were to mount a powerful attack on Britain, he could not guarantee air superiority for more than 48 hours. (Note: Richards wrote that on 4 June there were no more than 446 operational aircraft of which 331 were Hurricanes and Spitfires (and compares this with the figures for 11 August: 704, of which 620 were Hurricanes and Spitfires).) Sinclair added that the RAF was running short of fighter pilots and this was now the limiting factor. (Note: Nearly 300 fighter pilots were lost over France and the Low Countries.)

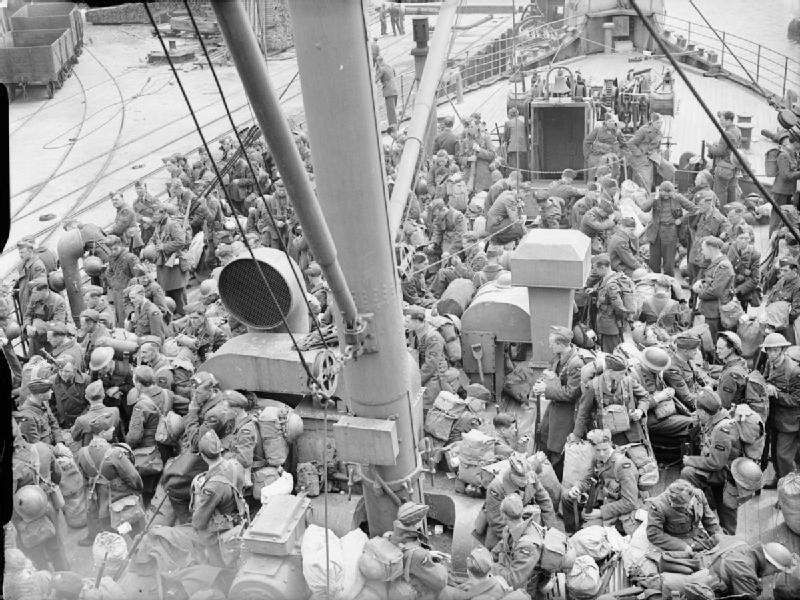
RAF personnel evacuating from Brest, during Operation Aerial

Churchill reopened the discussion on 4 June, noting that the Air Defence of Great Britain now had 45 fighter squadrons and that according to Lord Beaverbrook (the Minister of Aircraft Production) there were more aircraft in Britain than before the start of the German offensive. Beaverbrook then gave more detailed figures for the period 19 May – 1 June. (Note: The period chosen excludes both the initial high attrition of bombers and the loss of repairable fighters as Air Component bases were evacuated. Richards (1983) gives British fighter losses from 10 May to the end of the Dunkirk evacuation as 432 (p.145) with just under 300 fighter pilots being lost (p.156). The War Cabinet had been told that French aircraft losses were running at 37 per day, with ten aircraft per day being produced domestically and imports from America averaging eight per day.) Sinclair countered that Fighter Command needed to recover its efficiency as well as its numerical strength; the squadrons were greatly disorganised and many of their finest leaders had been lost; Churchill did not press the matter further. On 5 June the Germans attacked the French line on the Somme; the French repeated their request for British fighter squadrons, asking for ten squadrons immediately, to be followed by another ten as soon as possible. (Note: This request for half the remaining British fighter strength came in a letter from General Joseph Vuillemin which angered Churchill (amongst others) - referring to British air support to date as "tardy, inadequate, but nevertheless of value".)

Two Hurricane squadrons were sent to join the AASF (7 May) and four British-based squadrons operated each day from aerodromes near Rouen, returning to Britain every night. (Note: Produced by reorganisation of three understrength squadrons.) At the Defence Committee of 8 June, Churchill argued that whereas the battle for France was important it would not be decisive; maintaining adequate fighter defences for Britain would be decisive. The Committee unanimously agreed with Churchill's conclusion that it would be fatal to yield to the French demands and jeopardise British security. No further squadrons were sent and the AASF moved again to bases around the mouth of the Loire, eventually returning to Britain from 15 to 18 June. Large numbers of RAF personnel were evacuated by sea from French ports in Operation Aerial. An unknown number of them were lost off St Nazaire on 17 June, when the troopship, HMS Lancastria, was bombed and sunk by the Luftwaffe. An estimated 800 men of the RAF had been sent down into the ship's holds, which were penetrated by three German bombs.

== Order of battle, 10 May ==
Air Component BEF (Air-Vice-Marshal Charles Blount)
Squadron	Aircraft
50 (Army Cooperation) Wing
4 Squadron	Lysander
13 Squadron	Lysander
16 Squadron	Lysander
51 (Army Cooperation) Wing
2 Squadron	Lysander
26 Squadron	Lysander
52 (Bomber) Wing
53 Squadron	Blenheim
59 Squadron	Blenheim
70 (Bomber) Wing
18 Squadron	Blenheim
57 Squadron	Blenheim
14 (Fighter) Group
60 Wing
85 Squadron	Hurricane
87 Squadron	Hurricane
61 Wing
607 Squadron	Hurricane
615 Squadron	Hurricane
63 Wing
3 Squadron	Hurricane
79 Squadron	Hurricane
Communications squadron
81 Squadron	Tiger Moth

AASF (Air Vice-Marshal Patrick Playfair)
Squadron	Aircraft
67 (Fighter) Wing
1 Squadron	Hurricane
73 Squadron	Hurricane
501 Squadron	Hurricane
71 (Bomber) Wing
105 Squadron	Battle
114 Squadron	Blenhem IV
139 Squadron	Blenheim IV
150 Squadron	Battle
76 (Bomber) Wing
12 Squadron	Battle
142 Squadron	Battle
226 Squadron	Battle
75 (Bomber) Wing
88 Squadron	Battle
103 Squadron	Battle
218 Squadron	Battle
