= Desmond Dreyer =

Royal Navy Admiral (1910-2003)

Admiral Sir Desmond Dreyer GCB CBE DSC DL
- Born: 6 April 1910; Warwick, Warwickshire
- Died: 15 May 2003 (aged 93); Winchester, Hampshire
- Military career
- Allegiance: United Kingdom
- Branch: Royal Navy
- Service years: 1924–1968
- Rank: Admiral
- Commands: Far East Fleet (1962–65); Flag Officer, Air (Home) (1961–62); 3rd Destroyer Squadron (1953–55)
- Conflicts: Second World War; Battle of the River Plate; Norwegian campaign; Mediterranean campaign; Suez Crisis; Malayan Emergency
- Awards: Knight Grand Cross of the Order of the Bath; Commander of the Order of the British Empire; Distinguished Service Cross

Admiral Sir Desmond Parry Dreyer GCB CBE DSC DL (6 April 1910 – 15 May 2003) was a senior Royal Navy officer who served as Second Sea Lord and Chief of Naval Personnel from 1965 to 1967.

== Naval career ==
Born the second son of Admiral Sir Frederic Charles Dreyer, Desmond Dreyer joined the Royal Navy in 1924. He served in the Second World War at sea and in the Admiralty. He distinguished himself as gunnery officer on HMS Ajax at the Battle of the River Plate in December 1939, winning the Distinguished Service Cross for his role in this action. He served on HMS Coventry during the Norwegian campaign and from 1941 to 1943 on the battleships King George V and Duke of York.

From July 1953 to April 1955, Dreyer commanded the 3rd Destroyer Squadron in the Mediterranean. He was appointed chief of staff to the commander-in-chief, Mediterranean Fleet in 1955 and was involved in the Suez Crisis in 1956. He went on to be Assistant Chief of the Naval Staff in 1958, Flag Officer (Flotillas) for the Mediterranean Fleet in 1960 and Flag Officer, Air (Home) in 1961. He was appointed Commander-in-Chief, Far East Fleet in 1962: following the Malayan Emergency he co-ordinated Commonwealth naval forces in their successful resistance to Indonesian incursions into the newly formed Malaysia.

Dreyer was promoted to full admiral on 5 June 1965, and became Second Sea Lord and Chief of Naval Personnel in 1965. He was also Principal Naval Aide-de-camp to the Queen from 1965 to 1968. His last appointment was as Chief Advisor (Personnel and Logistics) to Denis Healey, the Secretary of State for Defence in 1967: he retired in 1968.

== Later life ==
In retirement, Dreyer became a member of the Prices and Incomes Board and the Armed Forces' Pay Review Board. He was also Deputy Lieutenant of Hampshire. From 1970 to 1971 he was chairman of the Royal Navy Club of 1765 & 1785 (United 1889).

== Family ==
In 1934, Dreyer married Elisabeth Chilton: they went on to have two sons and a daughter. In 1959, following his wife's death, he married Majorie Whiteley.

Military offices
| Preceded by Sir David Luce | Commander-in-Chief, Far East Fleet; 1962–1965 | Succeeded by Sir Frank Twiss |
| Preceded by Sir Royston Wright | Second Sea Lord; 1965–1967 | Succeeded by Sir Peter Hill-Norton |
Honorary titles
| Preceded by Sir Wilfrid Woods | First and Principal Naval Aide-de-Camp; 1965–1968 | Succeeded by Sir John Frewen |
Court offices
| Preceded by Sir William Stirling | Gentleman Usher to the Sword of State; 1973–1980 | Succeeded by Sir John Barraclough |
