= Edward Burgess (British Army officer) =

General Sir Edward Burgess KCB OBE
- Born: 30 September 1927; Purbrook, Hampshire
- Died: 8 May 2015 (aged 87)
- Military career
- Allegiance: United Kingdom
- Branch: British Army
- Service years: 1946–1987
- Rank: General
- Service number: 393092
- Commands: Deputy Supreme Allied Commander Europe; Field Army; Artillery Division; 25th Light Regiment
- Conflicts: Indonesia–Malaysia confrontation The Troubles
- Awards: Knight Commander of the Order of the Bath; Officer of the Order of the British Empire

General Sir Edward Arthur Burgess, KCB, OBE (30 September 1927 – 8 May 2015) was a British Army officer who served as Deputy Supreme Allied Commander Europe.

== Military career ==
Edward Burgess was commissioned into the Royal Artillery in 1948. He became military assistant to General Sir John Hackett, General Officer Commanding the British Army of the Rhine and commander of Northern Army Group, in 1966 and commanding officer of 25th Light Regiment in 1970, leading his regiment in Hong Kong, Catterick and Northern Ireland. He rose to become Director of Army Recruiting at the Ministry of Defence in 1975 and Director of Combat Development at the Ministry of Defence in 1977 before going on to be General Officer Commanding the Artillery Division in 1979. He then became Commander UK Field Army in 1982 and Deputy Supreme Allied Commander Europe in 1984. He retired in 1987.

He was Colonel Commandant of the Royal Artillery from 1982 to 1992.

He was also an ADC General to the Queen.

He was appointed an Officer of the Order of the British Empire (OBE) in May 1972, and a Knight Commander of the Order of the Bath (KCB) in the 1982 Birthday Honours.

He was appointed Gentleman Usher to the Sword of State in 1988.

== Retirement ==
In retirement he has become President of the Royal British Legion. He died on 8 May 2015.

Military offices
Preceded by Sir Frank Kitson	Commander UK Field Army; 1982–1984	Succeeded by Sir John Akehurst
Preceded by Sir Peter Terry	Deputy Supreme Allied Commander Europe; 1984–1987	Succeeded by Sir John Akehurst
Court offices
Preceded by Sir John Barraclough	Gentleman Usher to the Sword of State; 1988–1997	Succeeded by Sir Michael Layard
