= Reginald Brade =

British civil servant (1864–1933)

Sir Reginald Brade
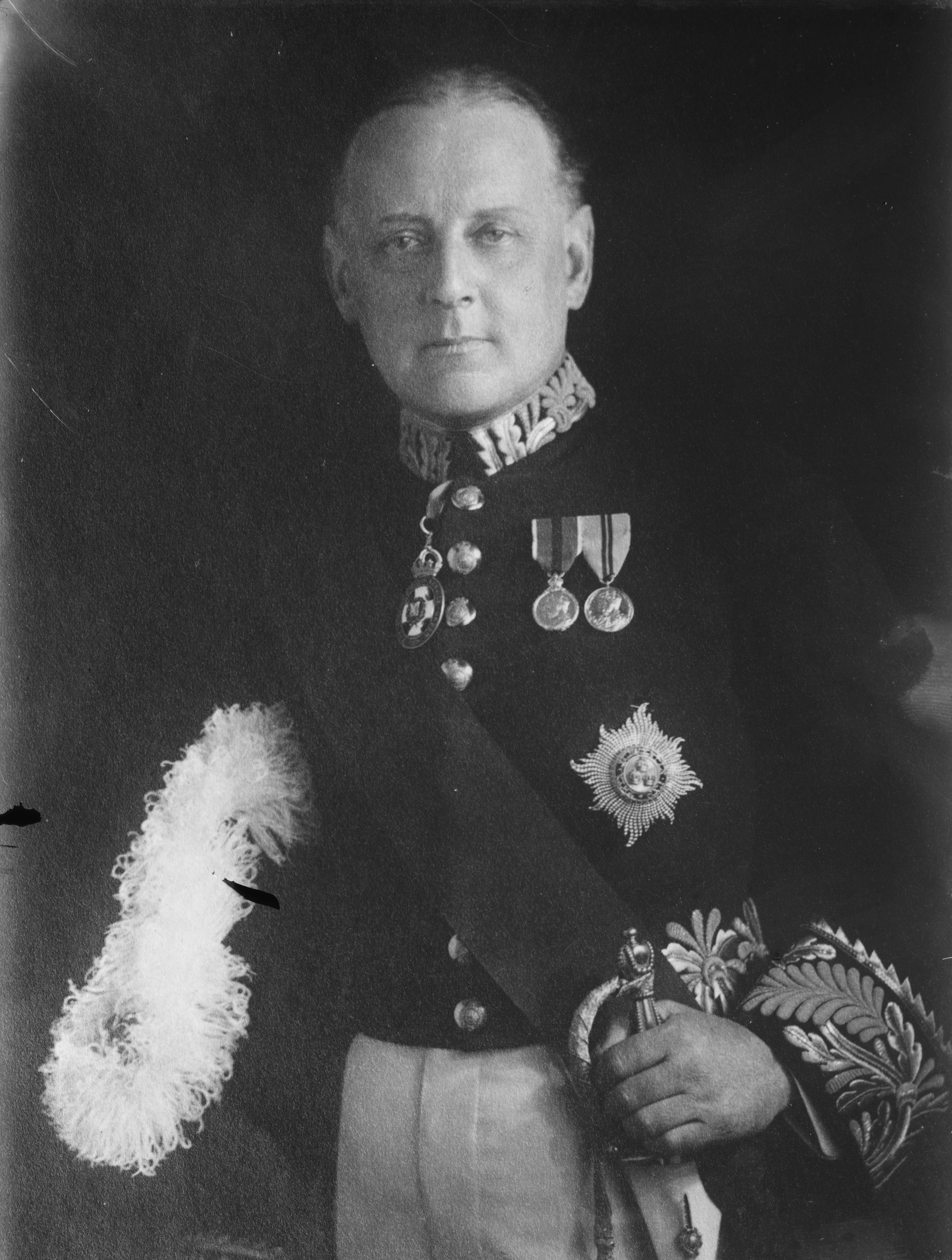
- Sir Reginald Brade, c.1900
- Born: Reginald Herbert Brade; 15 August 1864; Melbourne, Australia
- Died: 5 January 1933 (aged 68); Surrey, England
- Occupation: Civil servant

Sir Reginald Herbert Brade GCB (1864 – 1933) was a British civil servant.

== Life ==
Brade was educated at Bradfield College. He entered the War Office as Clerk of the Higher Division of the Civil Service in 1884. He was a Private Secretary between 1892 and 1896, first to Lord Sandhurst and Lord Monkswell when they were Parliamentary Under-Secretary of State for War, and then to Joseph Powell Williams when he was Financial Secretary to the War Office. Between 1901 and 1914, Brade was a Secretary of the Army Council and Assistant Secretary of the War Office. He was the Permanent Under-Secretary of State for War from 1914 to 1920. He also was Secretary and Registrar of the Distinguished Service Order in 1906. He was Gentleman Usher to the Sword of State from 1924 until his death.

== Honours and awards ==
- Order of the Bath (UK)
  - Knight Grand Cross (GCB) 1919
  - Knight Commander (KCB) 1914
  - Companion (CB) 1906
- King George V Coronation Medal (UK)
- Commander (Commandeur) of the Legion of Honour (Légion d'honneur), France
- Commander (Commandeur) of the Order of Leopold (Leopoldsorde/Ordre de Léopold), Belgium

Political offices
Preceded by Sir Edward Ward	Permanent Under-Secretary of State for War; 1914–1920	Succeeded by Sir Herbert Creedy
