= William Stirling (British Army officer, born 1907) =

British Army general (1907–1973)

General Sir William Stirling GCB CBE DSO
- Born: 25 May 1907; Chelsea, London, England
- Died: 29 August 1973 (aged 66); Bury St Edmunds, Suffolk, England
- Military career
- Allegiance: United Kingdom
- Branch: British Army
- Service years: 1926–1966
- Rank: General
- Service number: 36888
- Unit: Royal Artillery
- Commands: British Army of the Rhine; Western Command; 2nd Division; 27th Infantry Brigade
- Conflicts: Second World War; Palestine Emergency
- Awards: Knight Grand Cross of the Order of the Bath; Commander of the Order of the British Empire; Companion of the Distinguished Service Order

General Sir William Gurdon Stirling, GCB, CBE, DSO (25 May 1907 – 29 August 1973) was a British Army officer who reached high office during the 1960s.

== Military career ==
Born the son of Major Charles Stirling (1870–1914) of Ropers Hall, Bures, Suffolk and his wife the Hon. Amy Harriott Gurdon (1864–1944) (daughter of Lord Cranworth), William Stirling attended the Royal Military Academy, Woolwich, from which he was commissioned into the Royal Artillery on 30 August 1926. He served in the Second World War as Assistant Military Secretary at the War Office and was deployed to North Africa and North West Europe.

Stirling was appointed Commander, Royal Artillery for the 1st Infantry Division in Palestine during the Palestine Emergency between 1947 and 1948, going on to be chief of staff at Anti-Aircraft Command between 1950 and 1952. He was appointed commander 27th Infantry Brigade in 1952 and then Principal Staff Officer to the Chairman of the Chiefs of Staff in 1956. He became General Officer Commanding of the 2nd Division in 1958 and General Officer Commanding-in-Chief for Western Command in 1960.

Stirling went on to be Military Secretary to the Secretary of State for War in 1961 and Commander-in-Chief, British Army of the Rhine and Commander, Northern Army Group in 1963; he retired in 1966.

From 1967 to 1973 Stirling was Gentleman Usher to the Sword of State, an officer of the Royal Household.

== Family ==
In 1941 Stirling married Frances Marguerite Wedderburn Wilson and together they went on to have three daughters.

Military offices
Preceded by Cosmo Nevill	General Officer Commanding 2nd Division; 1958–1960	Succeeded by Alexander Williams
Preceded by Sir Otway Herbert	General Officer Commanding-in-Chief Western Command; 1960–1961	Succeeded by Sir Edward Howard-Vyse
Preceded by Sir Geoffrey Thompson	Military Secretary; 1961–1963	Succeeded by Sir John Anderson
Preceded by Sir James Cassels	Commander-in-Chief of the British Army of the Rhine; 1963–1966	Succeeded by Sir John Hackett
Court offices
Preceded by Sir Arthur Barratt	Gentleman Usher to the Sword of State; 1967–1973	Succeeded by Sir Desmond Dreyer
