= John Wilsey (British Army officer, born 1904) =

British Army general (1904–1961)

Major-General John Wilsey CB CBE DSO
- Born: 29 November 1904; Camberley, Surrey, England
- Died: 20 July 1961 (aged 56); St. Saviour, Jersey
- Relatives: Sir John Wilsey (son)
- Military career
- Allegiance: United Kingdom
- Branch: British Army
- Service years: 1924–1956
- Rank: Major-General
- Nickname: "Felix"
- Service number: 30965
- Units: Dorsetshire Regiment; Worcestershire Regiment
- Commands: 2nd Division (1954–1956); 5th Infantry Brigade (1949–1950); Middle East Staff College (1945–1946); 158th Infantry Brigade (1945); 7th Battalion, Duke of Wellington's Regiment (1943–1944); 9th Battalion, Worcestershire Regiment (1943)
- Conflicts: Second World War
- Awards: Companion of the Order of the Bath; Commander of the Order of the British Empire; Distinguished Service Order

Major-General John Harold Owen Wilsey, CB, CBE, DSO (29 November 1904 − 20 July 1961) was a senior British Army officer who fought in the Second World War and later commanded the 2nd Division from 1954 to 1956.

== Military career ==
John Wilsey was born in 1904 and was educated at Haileybury and Imperial Service College and later attended the Royal Military College, Sandhurst. He passed out from the latter on 27 August 1924, and was commissioned as a second lieutenant into the Dorset Regiment, a line infantry regiment of the British Army. However, due to a lack of promotion in the Dorsets, he transferred to the Worcestershire Regiment on 27 February 1936, and was promoted to captain in that regiment.

Wilsey served in the Second World War, as commanding officer of the 9th Battalion, Worcestershire Regiment in Northern Ireland and Southeast England from January to October 1943. The battalion formed part of the 182nd Brigade of the 61st Division and, although initially selected to take part in the Allied invasion of Normandy, it fid not materialise. He then served as commanding officer of the 7th Battalion, Duke of Wellington's Regiment, which formed part of the 147th Brigade of the 49th (West Riding) Infantry Division. He led the battalion during the Allied invasion of Normandy in June 1944 and throughout the Battle of Normandy, and through most of the Northwest Europe Campaign until, in early January 1945, Wilsey was promoted to command the 158th Brigade, part of the 53rd (Welsh) Infantry Division, which he commanded for rest of the campaign in North West Europe until Victory in Europe Day in May 1945.

After the war Wilsey took command of the 5th Infantry Brigade in 1949, became Director of Infantry in 1951 and Director of Staff Duties at the War Office in 1953. His last appointment was as General Officer Commanding (GOC) 2nd Division from 1954 before retiring from the army in 1956.

In retirement Wilsey lived at Maufant Manor in St. Saviour on Jersey.

Military offices
Preceded by Basil Coad	General Officer Commanding 2nd Division; 1954–1956	Succeeded by Cosmo Nevill
