= Henry Bourke =

British Army officer

Brigadier Henry Bourke DSO OBE MC
- Born: 25 August 1900
- Died: 7 January 1983 (aged 82)
- Military career
- Allegiance: United Kingdom
- Branch: British Army
- Service years: 1919−1947
- Rank: Brigadier
- Service number: 18637
- Unit: Royal Garrison Artillery
- Commands: 51st Field Regiment, Royal Artillery; 2nd Infantry Division
- Conflicts: Second World War
- Awards: Distinguished Service Order; Officer of the Order of the British Empire; Military Cross

Brigadier Henry Sackville Joynt Bourke, DSO, OBE, MC (25 August 1900 – 7 January 1983) was a British Army officer who served in the Second World War. He briefly commanded the 2nd Infantry Division on three occasions.

== Military career ==
After graduating from the Royal Military Academy, Woolwich, Bourke was commissioned into the Royal Garrison Artillery on 18 December 1919.

Promoted to acting lieutenant-colonel on 21 January 1942, he was appointed commanding officer of 51st Field Regiment Royal Artillery during the Second World War. He went on to be Commander Royal Artillery for 70th Infantry Division in India in 1942 and then Commander Royal Artillery for 2nd Infantry Division, initially on home defence duties in Yorkshire, and then, from April 1944, in Burma. He briefly served as acting General Officer Commanding the 2nd Division from 26 August to 10 September 1944, from 13 September to 24 September 1944 and from 1 June 1945 to 12 July 1945. He was awarded the Military Cross on 8 July 1941 and appointed an Officer of the Order of the British Empire in the 1942 New Year Honours.

== Works ==
- Bourke, Henry Sackville Joynt (1924). Horse Training. Hutchinson and Co.
