= Cosmo Nevill =

British Army general (1907–2002)

Major-General Cosmo Nevill CB CBE DSO
- Born: 14 July 1907; Bordon, Hampshire, England
- Died: 19 September 2002 (aged 95)
- Military career
- Allegiance: United Kingdom
- Branch: British Army
- Service years: 1927–1960
- Rank: Major-General
- Service number: 38525
- Unit: Royal Fusiliers
- Commands: 2nd Division; British Army School of Infantry; 6th Infantry Brigade; 1st Battalion, Royal Fusiliers; 2nd Battalion, Devonshire Regiment
- Conflicts: Second World War
- Awards: Companion of the Order of the Bath; Commander of the Order of the British Empire; Distinguished Service Order

Major-General Cosmo Alexander Richard Nevill, CB, CBE, DSO (14 July 1907 – 19 September 2002) was a senior British Army officer who fought in the Second World War in Western Europe and later commanded the 2nd Division from 1956 to 1958.

== Military career ==
Nevill was educated at Harrow School and the Royal Military College Sandhurst. He was commissioned into the Royal Fusiliers in 1927 and then served in India from 1932. He fought in the Second World War in Burma and then took part in the Normandy landings as commanding officer of the 2nd Battalion of the Devonshire Regiment. His battalion captured the Longues-sur-Mer battery and took 120 prisoners, earning him the Distinguished Service Order.

After the war Nevill served on the General Staff of the Military Staff Committee at the United Nations in New York. He became commanding officer of the 1st Battalion Royal Fusiliers in Germany in 1950, commander of the 6th Infantry Brigade at Münster and Wuppertal in 1951 and commandant of the School of Infantry at Warminster in 1954. His last appointment was as General Officer Commanding of the 2nd Infantry Division at Hilden in 1956 before he retired in 1960 following a heart attack.

In retirement Nevill became a respected oil painter.

== Family ==
In 1934 Nevill married Grania Goodliffe; they had a son and a daughter.

Military offices
Preceded by Richard Elton Goodwin	Commandant of the School of Infantry; 1954–1956	Succeeded by Geoffrey Musson
Preceded by John Wilsey	General Officer Commanding 2nd Division; 1956–1958	Succeeded by William Stirling
