= Richard Dannatt =

British Army officer (born 1950)

General The Right Honourable The Lord Dannatt GCB CBE MC DL
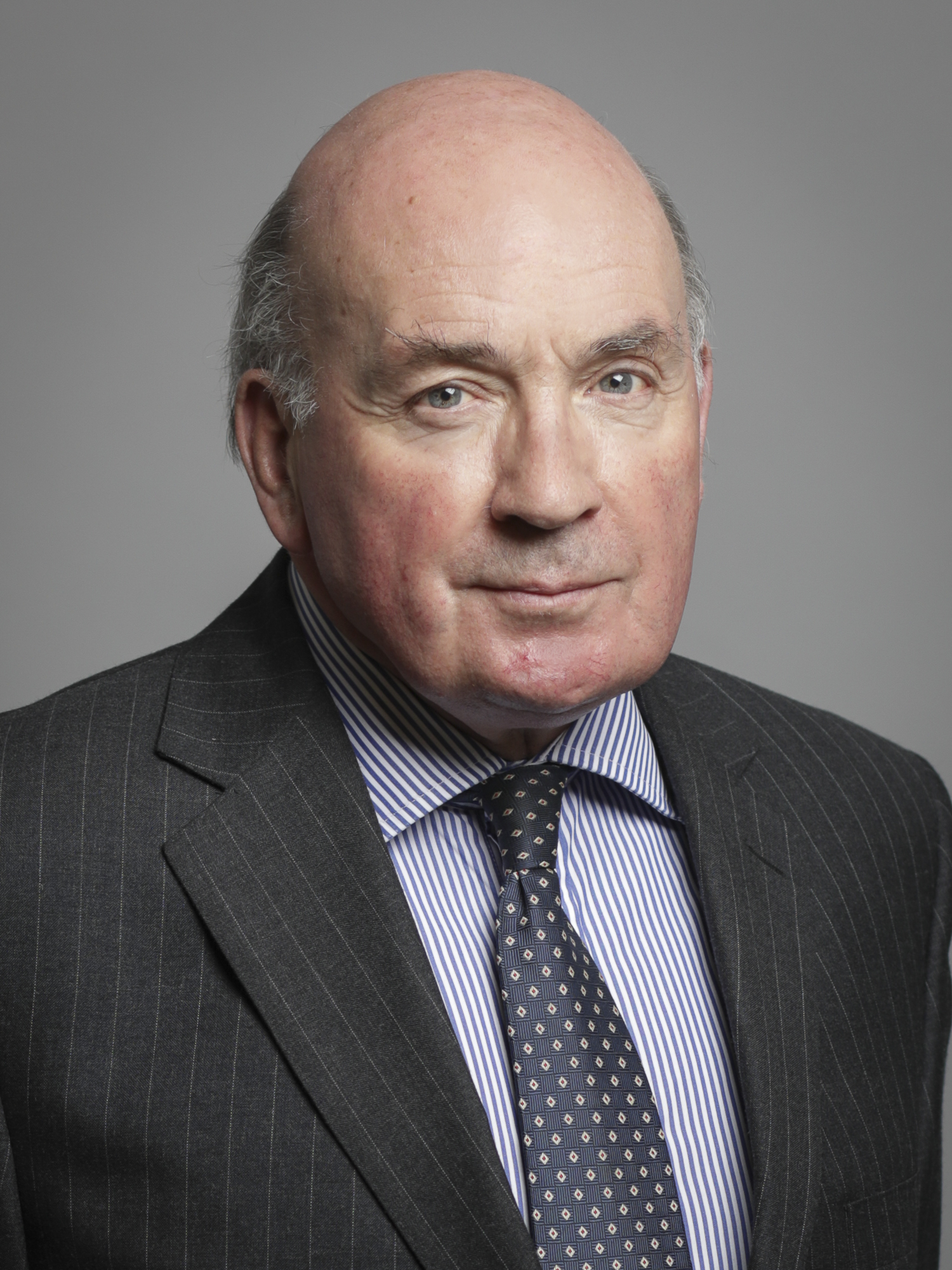
- Official portrait, 2020
- Born: Francis Richard Dannatt; 23 December 1950 (age 75); Broomfield, Essex, England
- Military career
- Allegiance: United Kingdom
- Branch: British Army
- Service years: 1971–2009
- Rank: General
- Service number: 491436
- Unit: Green Howards
- Commands: 1st Battalion, Green Howards; 4th Armoured Brigade; 3rd Mechanised Division; Allied Rapid Reaction Corps; Land Command; Chief of the General Staff
- Conflicts: The Troubles; Bosnian War; Kosovo War
- Awards: Knight Grand Cross of the Order of the Bath; Commander of the Order of the British Empire; Military Cross; Queen's Commendation for Valuable Service
- Other work: Constable of the Tower (2009–2016)

Member of the House of Lords
- Lord Temporal
- Life peerage 19 January 2011

Personal details
- Party: Crossbencher

General Francis Richard Dannatt, Baron Dannatt, GCB, CBE, MC, DL (born 23 December 1950) is a retired senior British Army officer and member of the House of Lords. He was Chief of the General Staff (head of the British Army) from 2006 to 2009. Dannatt was commissioned into the Green Howards in 1971, and his first tour of duty was in Belfast as a platoon commander. During his second tour of operations, also in Northern Ireland, Dannatt was awarded the Military Cross. Following a major stroke in 1977, Dannatt considered leaving the army, but was encouraged by his commanding officer to stay. After Staff College, he became a company commander and eventually assumed command of the Green Howards in 1989. He attended and then commanded the Higher Command and Staff Course, after which he was promoted to brigadier. Dannatt was given command of the 4th Armoured Brigade in 1994 and in the following year commanded the British component of the Implementation Force in Bosnia and Herzegovina.

Dannatt took command of the 3rd Mechanised Division in 1999 and simultaneously commanded British forces in Kosovo. After a brief tour in Bosnia, he was appointed Assistant Chief of the General Staff. Following the attacks of 11 September 2001, he became involved in planning for subsequent operations in the Middle East. As Commander of the Allied Rapid Reaction Corps (ARRC), a role he assumed in 2003, Dannatt led the ARRC headquarters in planning for deployments to Iraq and Afghanistan. The ARRC served in Afghanistan in 2005, but by this time Dannatt was Commander-in-Chief, Land Command—the day-to-day commander of the British Army. He was responsible for implementing a controversial reorganisation of the infantry, which eventually resulted in his regiment, the Green Howards, being amalgamated into the Yorkshire Regiment.

Dannatt was appointed Chief of the General Staff (CGS) in August 2006, succeeding General Sir Mike Jackson. Dannatt faced controversy over his outspokenness, in particular his calls for improved pay and conditions for soldiers and for a drawdown of operations in Iraq in order to better staff those in Afghanistan. He also set about trying to increase his public profile, worried that he was not recognisable enough at a time when he had to defend the army's reputation against alleged prisoner abuse in Iraq. He later assisted with the formation of Help for Heroes to fund a swimming pool at Headley Court and, later in his tenure, brokered an agreement with the British press that allowed Prince Harry to serve in Afghanistan. He was succeeded as CGS by Sir David Richards and retired in 2009, taking up the largely honorary post of Constable of the Tower of London, which he held until July 2016.

Between November 2009 and the British general election in May 2010, Dannatt served as a defence adviser to Conservative Party leader David Cameron. Dannatt resigned when Cameron's party formed a coalition government with the Liberal Democrats after the election produced a hung parliament, arguing that the prime minister should rely primarily on the advice of the incumbent service chiefs. Dannatt published an autobiography in 2010 and continues to be involved with a number of charities and organisations related to the armed forces. He is married with four children, one of whom served as an officer in the Grenadier Guards.

In December 2025, Dannatt was suspended from the House of Lords for four months for offering to secure meetings for a client to lobby government ministers.

== Early life ==
Dannatt, the son of Anthony and Mary (née Chilvers), was born at home in Broomfield—now a suburb of Chelmsford—in Essex. His father and grandfather were architects, working from a practice in Chelmsford, and his mother was a part-time teacher at the London Bible College. He had an elder sister who died from breast cancer in 1988. Dannatt was heavily influenced by his paternal great-grandfather, a Victorian farmer and devout Christian who devised a drainage system.

Dannatt and his sister were sent to separate boarding schools. He attended Felsted Junior School, where he gained an ambition to become a professional cricketer. For his secondary education, he was sent to St. Lawrence College in Ramsgate, Kent, where he joined the Combined Cadet Force (CCF) and eventually rose to senior under-officer. While at school, he developed a dislike of his first name, Francis, after it was mistaken for a girl's and he was invited to a birthday party at which he was the only boy. He eventually switched to his middle name, Richard, when he was fifteen. By then aspiring to become a barrister, Dannatt applied to study law at Emmanuel College, Cambridge but was turned down after an interview, at which point his ambition switched towards a military career.

== Early military career ==
Having initially been interested in a tank regiment, Dannatt was interviewed at the Regular Commissions Board (later renamed the Army Officer Selection Board) by an officer from the Green Howards, who persuaded him to consider the infantry and arranged for a visit to a barracks near Colchester. There he met Peter Inge, then a major, and Dannatt became set on joining the Green Howards. He entered the Royal Military Academy, Sandhurst in September 1969 and was commissioned into the Green Howards as a second lieutenant on 30 July 1971. After a short period of leave, he was sent to Belfast, Northern Ireland, as a platoon commander.

Upon completion of the tour, Dannatt returned to Great Britain to take a platoon commanders' course, after which he rejoined the Green Howards at their barracks in West Germany. He and his platoon returned to Belfast in late 1972. For gallantry on an operation in which his platoon came under fire in East Belfast on 7 February 1972, he was later awarded the Military Cross. His first promotion was to lieutenant on 30 January 1973.

Having completed his tour in Northern Ireland, Dannatt applied to take an "in-service" degree—a degree at a civilian university, sponsored by the army, at Hatfield College, Durham University. He was accepted, and commenced study of economic history later in 1973. During his first year at university, Dannatt attended a debate at Trinity College, Dublin—a rare opportunity for a serving British officer at the height of The Troubles.

In 1974, he was involved in fundraising for a specially adapted Mini car to be provided for a disabled fellow student, Sue Foster, which included charity dinners held at various colleges and a sponsored walk to Scotch Corner and back.

As part of the arrangement for the "in-service" degree, Dannatt was required to return to the Green Howards during the academic summer break. For both summers, the regiment was serving in Northern Ireland—in Armagh in 1974 and South Armagh in 1975. During the 1975 tour Dannatt was involved in an operation to destroy an improvised explosive device, but it was booby-trapped and detonated; Dannatt was uninjured but four soldiers, including Dannatt's company commander, Major Peter Willis, were killed. Shortly thereafter, Dannatt arrested a man in connection with the incident and later gave evidence against him in court. Dannatt graduated in 1976 and, rejoining his regiment, was posted to Berlin. He was appointed battalion adjutant and promoted to captain in July 1977.

On 11 November 1977, aged 26, Dannatt suffered a major stroke; he spent most of the next two years recovering, but was allowed to return to duty in 1978. He was posted to Northern Ireland, accompanied by his wife, who gave birth to the couple's first son in Craigavon Area Hospital a few weeks into the tour.

Dannatt left Northern Ireland ahead of the rest of the battalion and was posted to the Royal Military Academy Sandhurst in Surrey, then under the command of Major General (later General Sir) Rupert Smith, and expected this to be his last posting in the light of his stroke. He applied for a variety of jobs outside the army but, after Smith's encouragement, sat the entrance exams for Staff College, Camberley, also in Surrey. He passed the entrance exams and turned down two civilian job offers to accept his place. Before Camberley, in late 1980, Dannatt was posted to Catterick Garrison, North Yorkshire, as a company commander.

In early 1981, his company took over the running of HM Prison Frankland during a month-long strike by prison officers. Shortly after the end of the strike, he was posted to Cyprus with the United Nations peacekeeping force before returning to Surrey for the start of the one-year Command and Staff Course at Camberley. After completing the course, he was promoted to major on 30 September 1982, and appointed chief of staff to 20th Armoured Brigade, based in West Germany.

After two years as chief of staff, Dannatt returned to the Green Howards, then also based in West Germany, to command a company for the second time in his career. He was posted to Northern Ireland for six months in 1985, his fifth tour in the province, though it was significantly quieter than his previous tours. He was appointed Military Assistant to the Minister of State for the Armed Forces in 1986, his first position at the Ministry of Defence (MoD) in London.

Promoted to lieutenant colonel on 30 June 1987, Dannatt spent three years at the MoD, in a role he described as "bridging the gap" between the military and politicians, most of whom did not have first-hand experience in the armed forces. At the end of his tenure, he was involved with Field Marshal Sir Nigel Bagnall's British Military Doctrine in its final stages as it was submitted for ministerial approval. The Green Howards celebrated their 300th anniversary in 1988 and Dannatt took command of the regiment in 1989. He was responsible for overseeing its transition into an airmobile role, forming part of 24th Airmobile Brigade. He served his sixth and final tour in Northern Ireland in 1991 when the Green Howards were deployed to South Armagh for a month.

Returning to Staff College, Camberley, Dannatt took the Higher Command and Staff Course (HCSC), after which he was promoted to colonel on 31 December 1991, backdated to 30 June 1991, and tasked with the running of the HCSC, as well as updating the British Military Doctrine in the light of the end of the Cold War. He also drafted the campaign plan for Lieutenant General (later General Sir) Mike Rose's command of the United Nations Protection Force (UNPROFOR) in the Balkans. Dannatt was promoted to brigadier on 31 December 1993, backdated to 30 June 1993, and took command of 4th Armoured Brigade, based in Germany. He spent 1994 commanding the brigade and overseeing training and, in 1995, was posted to Bosnia along with his headquarters staff, leaving the rest of the brigade in Germany and taking command of separate units already deployed in Bosnia. He commanded UNPROFOR's Sector South West, composed of troops from multiple nations, while also serving as Commander of British Forces (COMBRITFOR), responsible for overseeing operations of all British troops in Bosnia. After the signing of the Dayton Agreement in November 1995, UNPROFOR became the NATO-led Implementation Force and Dannatt's brigade was incorporated into a multi-national division commanded by Mike Jackson. Dannatt was later appointed a Commander of the Order of the British Empire (CBE) for his service in the Balkans.

Handing over 4th Armoured Brigade to David Richards, Dannatt was appointed Director, Defence Programme Staff at the MoD in 1996 and was responsible for part of the implementation of the Strategic Defence Review, produced by the Labour government that had come to power in 1997.

== High command ==
After three years at the MoD, Dannatt attained general officer status with promotion to major general, and took command of the 3rd Mechanised Division in January 1999. Later in the year, the prospect of NATO intervention in the Kosovo War became likely, and Dannatt and his staff began planning for a potential ground invasion of the territory. In the event, Slobodan Milošević agreed to withdraw Serbian–Yugoslav forces from Kosovo, the practicalities of which were negotiated by Mike Jackson. It was decided, given the large number of British troops serving as part of the multinational Kosovo Force (KFOR), that the 3rd Division's headquarters would deploy to oversee British operations, with Dannatt as COMBRITFOR. Not long after Dannatt's arrival, a Russian armoured column moved into Kosovo and took control of Pristina Airport. Wesley Clark, NATO's Supreme Allied Commander Europe, subsequently ordered Jackson, commander of KFOR, to block the runways of the airport and prevent Russia flying in reinforcements. The issue eventually became moot but Dannatt, as COMBRITFOR, had been ordered to veto the use of British troops—known in NATO as a "red card", afforded to each national contingent commander—for any such operation. He was later awarded the Queen's Commendation for Valuable Service for his conduct in Kosovo.

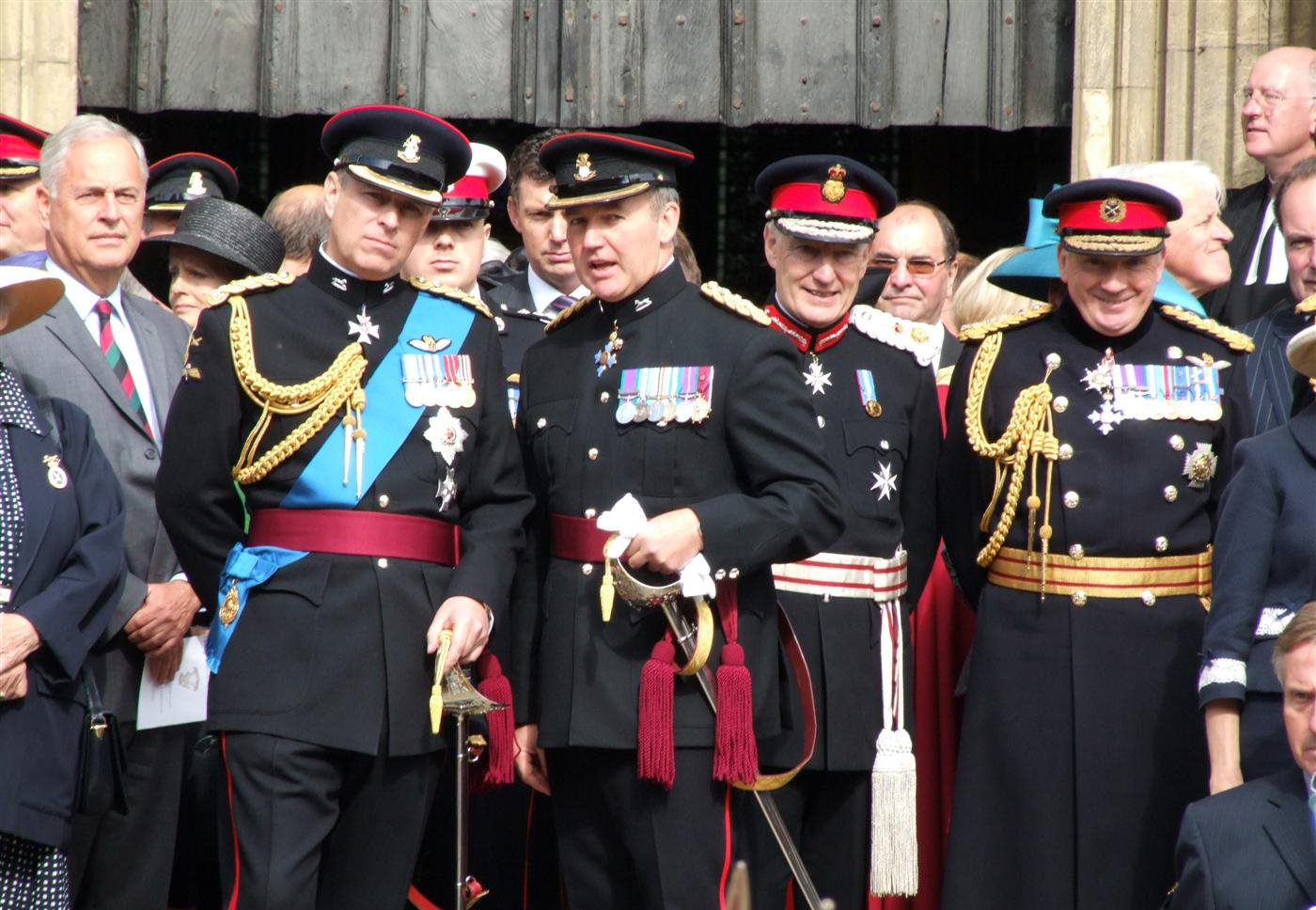
Dannatt (far right) with James Dugdale, 2nd Baron Crathorne, Lord Lieutenant of North Yorkshire; then-Major General Nick Houghton; and Prince Andrew, Duke of York (left)

Returning to the 3rd Division, Dannatt planned two exercises at the British Army Training Unit Suffield in Canada. The first was, at the time, the largest exercise the army had run since the end of the Cold War; the second only took place after Dannatt's tenure as commander had expired. Dannatt gave evidence as an expert witness in the trial of Radislav Krstić in relation to the Srebrenica massacre, shortly after which he was posted to Bosnia, where he served as deputy commander of NATO's Stabilisation Force in 2000. His tour, originally scheduled to last a full year was cut short when Sir Michael Willcocks took early retirement from the army in order to become Black Rod. The resulting personnel changes to fill the vacancy meant that Dannatt was appointed Assistant Chief of the General Staff (ACGS) in April 2001. In September 2001, he was on a visit to British troops in Cyprus and watched the immediate aftermath of the September 11 attacks on television. As ACGS, he was peripherally involved in planning for the army's subsequent involvement in Afghanistan and later Iraq, as well as standing in for the Chief of the General Staff (then Michael Walker) when Walker was unavailable. Dannatt was succeeded as ACGS by David Richards, to whom he had handed over command of 4th Armoured Brigade in 1996 and who later succeeded Dannatt as Chief of the General Staff.

Dannatt was appointed Commander, Allied Rapid Reaction Corps (COMARRC) on 16 January 2003 and promoted to lieutenant general the same day. During his tenure, he was predominantly concerned with planning for possible deployment of the ARRC in Iraq and Afghanistan. It was eventually deployed to Afghanistan, but not until after Dannatt had handed over its command to David Richards. Dannatt was knighted with his investiture as a Knight Commander of the Order of the Bath (KCB) in June 2004. He succeeded Sir Timothy Granville-Chapman as Commander-in-Chief, Land Command (CINCLAND)—responsible for day-to-day running of the army—on 7 March 2005, and was promoted to full general the same day. The prevailing issue during his tenure as Commander-in-Chief was the reorganisation of the infantry, an emotive issue as it resulted in the loss of many historic regimental names, including Dannatt's regiment, the Green Howards, which became 2nd Battalion, the Yorkshire Regiment (Green Howards). However, his term also coincided with an increase in the intensity of simultaneous operations in Iraq and Afghanistan, and Dannatt formed the view that government spending priorities did not accurately reflect the commitments of the British Armed Forces at the time.

=== Chief of the General Staff ===
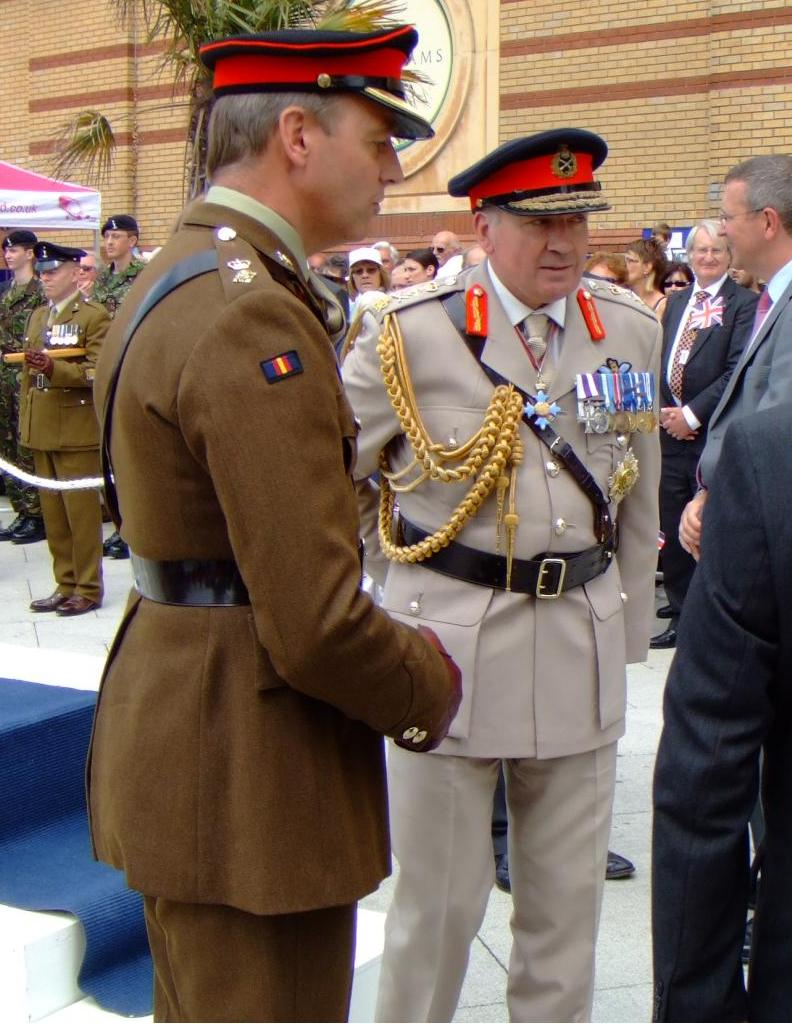
Dannatt (in the stone-coloured uniform) as CGS at an Armed Forces Day parade in Southend, Essex

Upon the retirement of Sir Mike Jackson, Dannatt was appointed Chief of the General Staff (CGS)—the professional head of the British Army—on 29 August 2006. Concerned that the formation of the British Armed Forces Federation meant that soldiers were losing confidence in generals to lobby on their behalf, his first act as CGS was to write a long letter to the Secretary of State for Defence, Des Browne, which he copied to the MoD's senior civil servant, Bill Jeffrey; Air Chief Marshal Sir Jock Stirrup, Chief of the Defence Staff (CDS); and to the First Sea Lord and Chief of the Air Staff—his opposite numbers in the Royal Navy and Royal Air Force respectively. In the letter, he asserted his view that the army was over-stretched by operations in Iraq and Afghanistan and that essential equipment, such as helicopters, was unavailable or ineffective and outdated, like the Snatch Land Rover. He also raised concerns with the standard of accommodation provided for soldiers at home and with soldiers' wages. The following weekend, he travelled to Afghanistan on his first official visit as CGS. He met Des Browne in person for the first time two days after becoming CGS and later acknowledged the difficulties faced by defence secretaries in the little time they have to prepare for the role.

Later in his tenure as CGS, Dannatt became concerned that his public profile was not high enough that he would be listened to outside of the army, especially given the ongoing controversy surrounding the courts-martial of soldiers alleged to be involved in the death of Baha Mousa. As such, he accepted an invitation to an informal gathering of officers and journalists at the Cavalry and Guards Club in September 2006. During the gathering, he raised issues with journalists about defence spending in general and soldiers' wages in particular. To his surprise, and as a result of media pressure and internal lobbying, a bonus for soldiers who had served six-month tours in Iraq and Afghanistan was announced a month later. Dannatt appeared in newspaper headlines in October 2006 when he gave an interview for Sarah Sands of the Daily Mail in which he opined that a drawdown of troops from Iraq was necessary in order to allow the army to focus on Afghanistan, and that wounded soldiers should recover in a military environment rather than civilian hospitals. His comments were supported by several journalists and retired officers, though others believed Dannatt had acted improperly and called for his resignation, while Simon Jenkins of The Times called Dannatt's comments "either daringly brave or totally naive".

Dannatt went on to chair a conference of welfare providers to military personnel in order to show that the army understood the issues affecting its soldiers and to organise a series of smaller conferences, hosted by himself and Sir Freddie Viggers—then Adjutant-General to the Forces—to discuss welfare issues with commanding officers across the UK. In 2007, Dannatt and his wife Pippa visited Headley Court, an MoD rehabilitation centre for wounded personnel, where the commanding officer informed the Dannatts of his desire for a swimming pool, but accepted that it was unlikely to receive government funding. Some time later, the Dannatts were introduced to Bryn and Emma Parry by Sarah-Jane Shirreff—the wife of Sir Richard Shirreff—and the Dannatts assisted the Parrys with the formation of Help for Heroes, set up with the specific aim of funding the swimming pool at Headley Court. Dannatt initially worried that the charity's £2 million goal might be unattainable, but it eventually raised enough money to build both the pool and a gymnasium, which were opened in 2010. He and Pippa later assisted both Help For Heroes and SSAFA Forces Help in efforts to build houses to accommodate the families of wounded servicemen at Headley Court and the Royal Centre for Defence Medicine in Birmingham, inspired by the difficulties faced by the family of George Cross recipient Peter Norton.

Another of Dannatt's priorities was tackling the perception of the British operations in Iraq and Afghanistan, as he was concerned the news media and the British public were unaware of the purpose or the intensity of the missions. Disgruntled by increasingly negative coverage, in August 2007 he interrupted a family holiday in Cornwall to fly to Afghanistan in an effort to change the coverage through a series of interviews. During the visit, he managed to meet with his son, Bertie, who was serving in the country with the Grenadier Guards. Later the same year, Dannatt raised the same issue in a lecture to the International Institute for Strategic Studies in London. Earlier that year, Dannatt had taken the decision not to allow Prince Harry to serve in Iraq. However, after Dannatt had brokered an understanding with the British press, Harry was able to serve in Afghanistan for three months in late 2007 and early 2008 until the story broke and he was ordered home.

In 2008, in the first speech of its kind by any CGS, Dannatt addressed the army-sponsored Fourth Joint Conference on Lesbian, Gay, Bisexual and Transsexual Matters, stating that homosexuals were welcome to serve in the army.

Dannatt was raised from Knight Commander to Knight Grand Cross of the Order of the Bath (GCB) in the 2008–2009 New Year Honours List. His tenure as CGS expired in August 2008 and he was succeeded for the last time by Sir David Richards. The government took the unusual decision to extend the tenure of Air Chief Marshal Sir Jock Stirrup as CDS, rather than promote one of the outgoing service chiefs. Thus all three, including Dannatt, retired, amid claims that Dannatt's potential promotion to CDS had been personally vetoed by Prime Minister Gordon Brown. His last act as CGS was to nominate Nick Houghton to become the next Vice-Chief of the Defence Staff.

=== Honorary titles ===
Dannatt was appointed Colonel, The Green Howards on 1 December 1994, succeeding Field Marshal Sir Peter Inge. He was in turn relieved by Brigadier John Powell in May 2003. Dannatt succeeded Sir Christopher Wallace as Deputy Colonel Commandant of the Adjutant General's Corps on 1 April 1999, holding the title until 17 June 2005, when he was relieved by Major General Bill Rollo. He was appointed Colonel Commandant of the King's Division, in succession to Sir Scott Grant, on 1 July 2001. He relinquished the title on 10 December 2005 to fellow Green Howard, Lieutenant General (later General Sir) Nick Houghton.

Between appointments in 2002, Dannatt spent six weeks at the School of Army Aviation at Army Air Corps Middle Wallop, where he was trained as a helicopter pilot in order to fulfil his duties as Colonel Commandant of the Army Air Corps (AAC), to which he was appointed on 1 April 2004, succeeding Michael Walker; Also in succession to Walker, he was appointed Aide de Camp General (ADC Gen) to Queen Elizabeth II on 5 June 2006. He was succeeded in his position with the AAC by Major General Adrian Bradshaw on 1 July 2009, and relinquished the appointment of ADC Gen on 1 September 2009.

== Later life ==
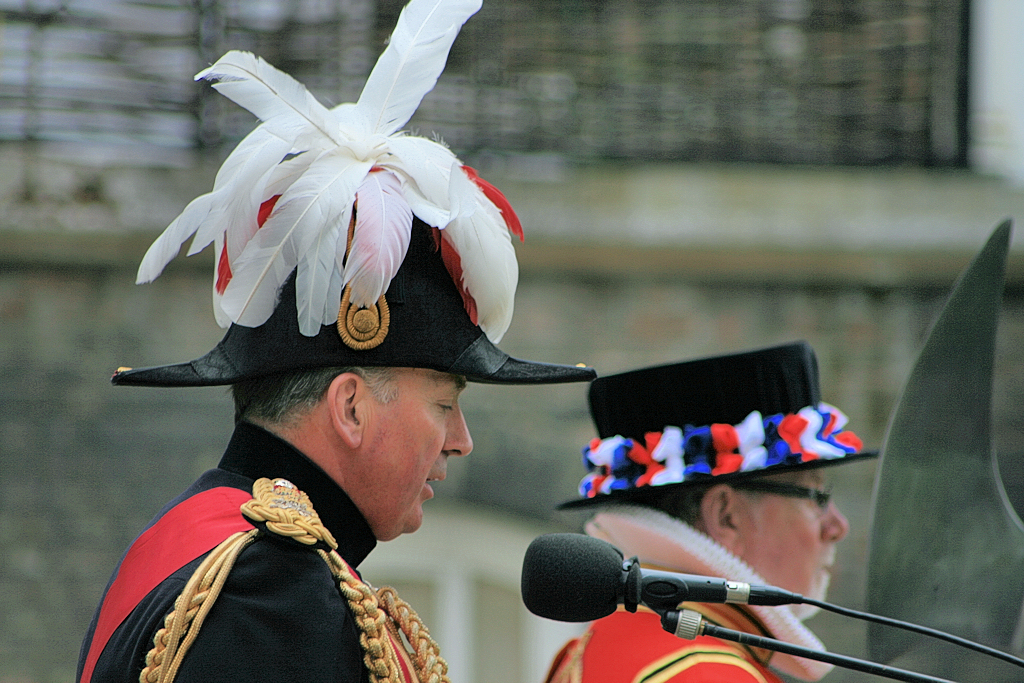
Dannatt in the full ceremonial uniform of the Constable of the Tower in 2010

It was announced in February 2009 that, after his retirement, Dannatt would be installed as the 159th Constable of the Tower of London. The tenure of the previous incumbent, General Sir Roger Wheeler, also a former CGS, expired on 31 July and Dannatt became constable on 1 August 2009. The Constable has been the most senior official at the Tower of London since the eleventh century. Today, the role is largely ceremonial, and conferred on field marshals or retired generals who usually serve a five-year term. After his retirement, Dannatt was appointed to be a Deputy Lieutenant of Greater London on 30 June 2010 and of Norfolk on 19 March 2012.

In 2009, Dannatt became an Honorary Doctor of Technology at Anglia Ruskin University.

After leaving office as CGS, Dannatt effectively retired from the army, but technically remained a serving officer until November 2009. Shortly after leaving office, Dannatt was approached by David Cameron, then leader of the Conservative Party and Leader of the Opposition. Cameron invited Dannatt to become a defence adviser for the Shadow Cabinet once he was officially retired from the army and no longer bound by Queen's Regulations, which mandate political neutrality in the armed forces. Although uncommon for a former service chief to align himself with one political party, Dannatt accepted the role on an informal basis. The timing of the decision, which became public in October 2009—within two months of Dannatt's effective retirement—attracted some controversy, with some former ministers and civil servants suggesting it potentially compromised the neutrality of the armed forces. He advised Cameron and his shadow cabinet until he resigned, shortly after the 2010 general election, stating that Cameron, by then prime minister, should turn to the incumbent chiefs of staff for defence advice and expressing no desire to become a special adviser.

The Council of the Royal United Services Institute (RUSI), a politically independent think tank dedicated to defence and security issues, elected Dannatt as the institute's Chairman in June 2009. He took up the appointment on 1 September 2009, but resigned in October the same year after the announcement that he was to become an adviser to David Cameron, believing that his resignation was necessary for RUSI to maintain its political neutrality. He was eventually succeeded by former Defence Secretary John Hutton, Baron Hutton of Furness.

Dannatt has written an autobiography, titled Leading from the Front, published by Bantam Press in 2010. In the book, he was critical of the Labour government that led the UK from 1997 to 2010 and in particular of Gordon Brown, Chancellor of the Exchequer and later prime minister, accusing him of "malign intervention" and, while chancellor, of refusing to fund Tony Blair's defence policy. He also criticised Blair for allowing himself to be effectively overruled by Brown and said of Air Chief Marshal Sir Jock Stirrup, then CDS, that "although brilliant at what he did, [he] could not have been expected to understand the sights, sounds and smells of the battlefield". The Daily Telegraph called the book "a searing indictment of how New Labour, and to some extent the military's high command, failed to properly lead, fund and equip the armed forces for the wars in Iraq and Afghanistan".

In July 2010, Dannatt gave evidence to the Iraq Inquiry, focusing predominantly on his role as ACGS in 2002. He described an initial reluctance to commit the army and stated that planning had been for a minimal land commitment and the provision of naval and air support to the United States. He also repeated his previous assertions that the army had been over-stretched by simultaneous operation in Iraq and Afghanistan in 2006 and re-stated his view that Afghanistan was the more important for British interests. Dannatt's evidence was followed by that of his predecessor as CGS, General Sir Mike Jackson.

In 2011, he became an adviser to energy firm Joule Africa, which later developed a hydroelectric plant in Sierra Leone.

In July 2016, he handed over his Tower of London role to the Deputy Governor and was succeeded by Sir Nick Houghton in October 2016. Also in 2016, his book Boots on the Ground: Britain and her Army since 1945, was published. In the book, he opined that "going to Iraq was a strategic error of near biblical proportions" and that the defence budget of 2% of GDP is "too meagre in the current security climate".

Commenting on the Victims Rights Campaign in September 2018, he told the news media that retiring soldiers, airmen and sailors should receive a psychological assessment as part of the resettlement package before leaving duty to help them avoid future prison and homelessness.

He became a paid adviser to the US defence company Teledyne Technologies in 2022. After Palestine Action targeted a Teledyne factory in Wales, Dannatt asked the government to take action against the group.

=== House of Lords ===
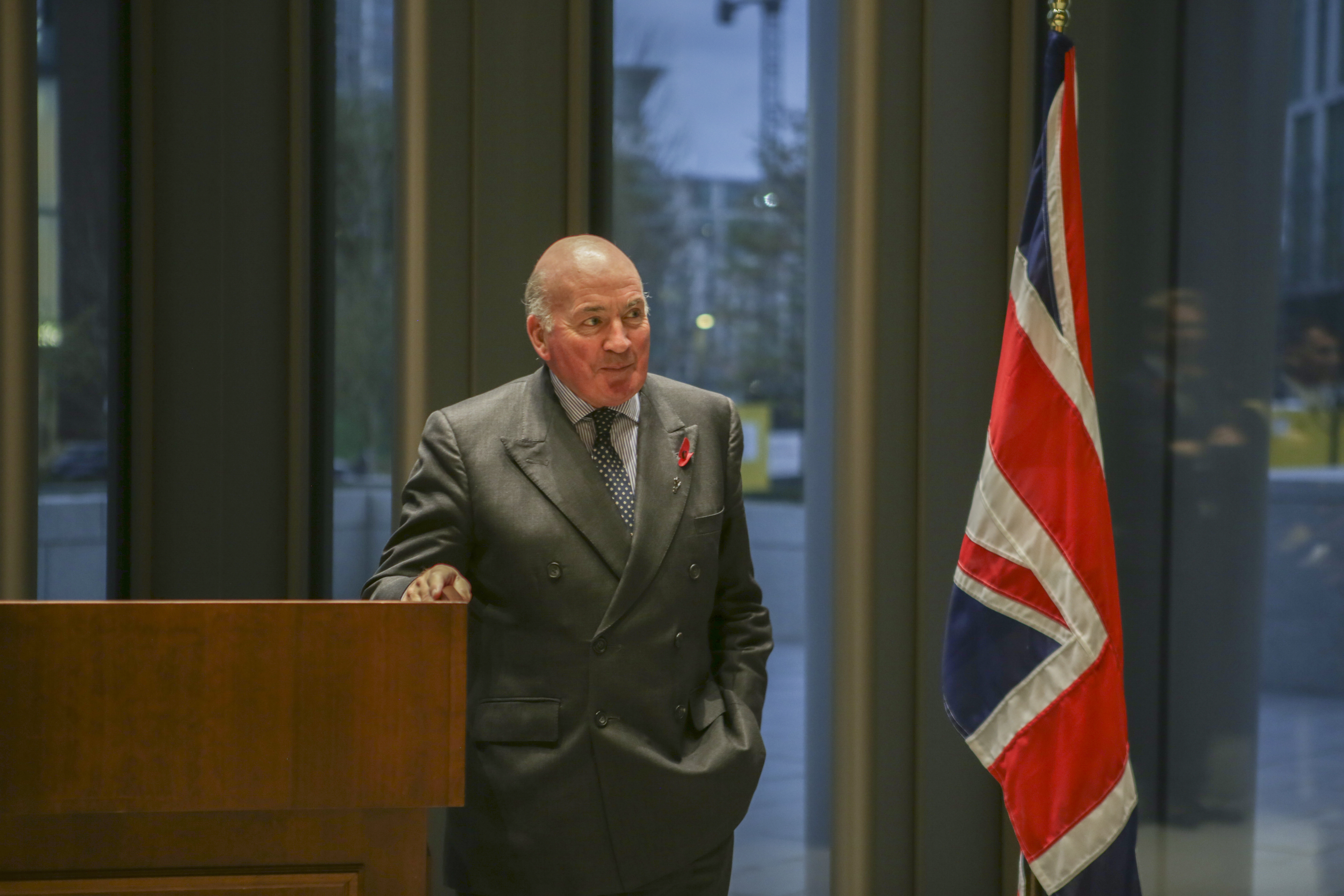
Lord Dannatt speaking at an event at the US Embassy, London in October 2018

Dannatt was nominated for a life peerage by David Cameron while Cameron was Leader of the Opposition. Although nominated for a political peerage on the Conservative Party benches, he opted to sit as a crossbencher and was ennobled as Baron Dannatt, of Keswick in the County of Norfolk on 19 January 2011.

In October 2012, The Times conducted an undercover investigation into Dannat's lobbying activities. According to The Guardian, Dannatt offered to lobby Bernard Gray, who was then Chief of Defence Materiel. Dannatt was quoted as saying he had engineered a seat at a formal dinner with the Ministry of Defence's new permanent secretary, Jon Thompson, to help another company, Capita Symonds, which was bidding for a contract to manage MoD estates. According to The Independent, Dannatt acknowledged that he had offered to assist in facilitating conversations, but stated that he had rejected an offer of an £8,000 per month fee to lobby on behalf of the organisation and that he had "no inclination" to contravene the rules on lobbying, and would regard any such claim as "seriously defamatory".

In March 2025, The Guardian reported that it had filmed Lord Dannatt telling undercover reporters he could make introductions to government ministers for a potential client seeking to lobby the government. Dannatt later stated he did not believe his conduct had breached the House of Lords Code of Conduct. On 14 March 2025, the House of Lords Commissioner for Standards opened an investigation into potential breaches of the Code. On 24 November 2025, the House of Lords Conduct Committee published a report upholding the Commissioner's findings of four breaches of the Code of Conduct, including offering or providing parliamentary services (such as facilitating meetings with ministers and officials) in return for payment or reward. The Committee recommended that Lord Dannatt be suspended from the service of the House for four months. On 8 December 2025, the House of Lords approved the recommendation, with the suspension taking effect immediately. Dannatt received four payments which he described as 'honorariums', rather than payments for introductions; he refused to disclose the amounts.

== Personal life ==
Dannatt met his wife, Philippa ("Pippa"; née Gurney), during his first year at Durham University in 1973. The couple became engaged, and married in March 1977, after which Pippa accompanied Dannatt on his return to Berlin. They had four children—three sons and one daughter. Their eldest son, Tom, is the founder of the charity Street Child. Bertie, their second son, served with the Grenadier Guards—Pippa's father's regiment—in Iraq and Afghanistan, earning a mention in despatches and reaching the rank of captain before leaving the army in 2008.

In 1977, then just 26, Dannatt suffered a major stroke, rendering him unable to speak and leaving the right-hand side of his body paralysed. He spent much of the subsequent two years recovering and was eventually allowed to return to duty, though he still tires more quickly on his right-hand side than on his left and has other minor residual effects. During his recovery, Dannatt, a devout Christian, was pointed to two Bible verses, which prompted him to believe that his commitment to his faith had thus far been "half-hearted" and inspired him to make a greater commitment which, according to his autobiography, "helped define who I then became, both as a person and as a soldier". Dannatt later attributed surviving his stroke and several other near-death experiences—including the incident for which he was awarded the Military Cross—to a challenge from God to "devote his life to Christ".

Dannatt has been Vice President of the Armed Forces Christian Union since 1998 and President of the Soldiers' and Airmen's Scripture Readers Association from 1999 to 2019, then becoming President Emeritus. He was President of the Army Rifle Association from 2000 to 2008 and of the Royal Norfolk Agricultural Association in 2008, presiding over that year's Royal Norfolk Show, attended by Prince Harry at Dannatt's invitation. He served as a trustee of the Windsor Leadership Trust since 2005 and as patron of Hope and Homes for Children since 2006, and continues his patronage of Help for Heroes, which he assisted in founding while CGS. He lists his leisure interests as cricket, tennis, fishing and shooting. He was appointed president of the Norfolk Churches Trust in November 2011, and Vice President of The Western Front Association in 2013. He is President of YMCA Norfolk and was chairman of the Norfolk Strategic Flooding Alliance (NSFA) until 2023.

He and his wife live in Keswick, South Norfolk.

Military offices
Preceded by Cedric Delves	GOC 3rd (UK) Mechanised Division; 1999–2000	Succeeded by John McColl
Preceded by Kevin O'Donoghue	Assistant Chief of the General Staff; 2001–2002	Succeeded by David Richards
Preceded by Chris Drewry	Commander Allied Rapid Reaction Corps; 2003–2005	Succeeded by David Richards
Preceded by Sir Timothy Granville-Chapman	C-in-C, Land Command; 2005–2006	Succeeded by Sir Redmond Watt
Preceded by Sir Mike Jackson	Chief of the General Staff; 2006–2009	Succeeded by Sir David Richards
Honorary titles
Preceded by Sir Roger Wheeler	Constable of the Tower of London; 2009–2016	Succeeded by Sir Nick Houghton
Other offices
Preceded by Sir Laurence New	President of the Soldiers' and Airmen's Scripture Readers Association; 1999–2019	Succeeded by Robert Thomson
Preceded by Sir Paul Lever	Chairman of the Royal United Services Institute; 2009	Succeeded by Lord Hutton
Orders of precedence in the United Kingdom
Preceded by The Lord Fink	Gentlemen; The Lord Dannatt	Followed by The Lord Wigley
