= Mike Jackson (British Army officer) =

British Army general (1944–2024)

General Sir Mike Jackson GCB CBE DSO DL
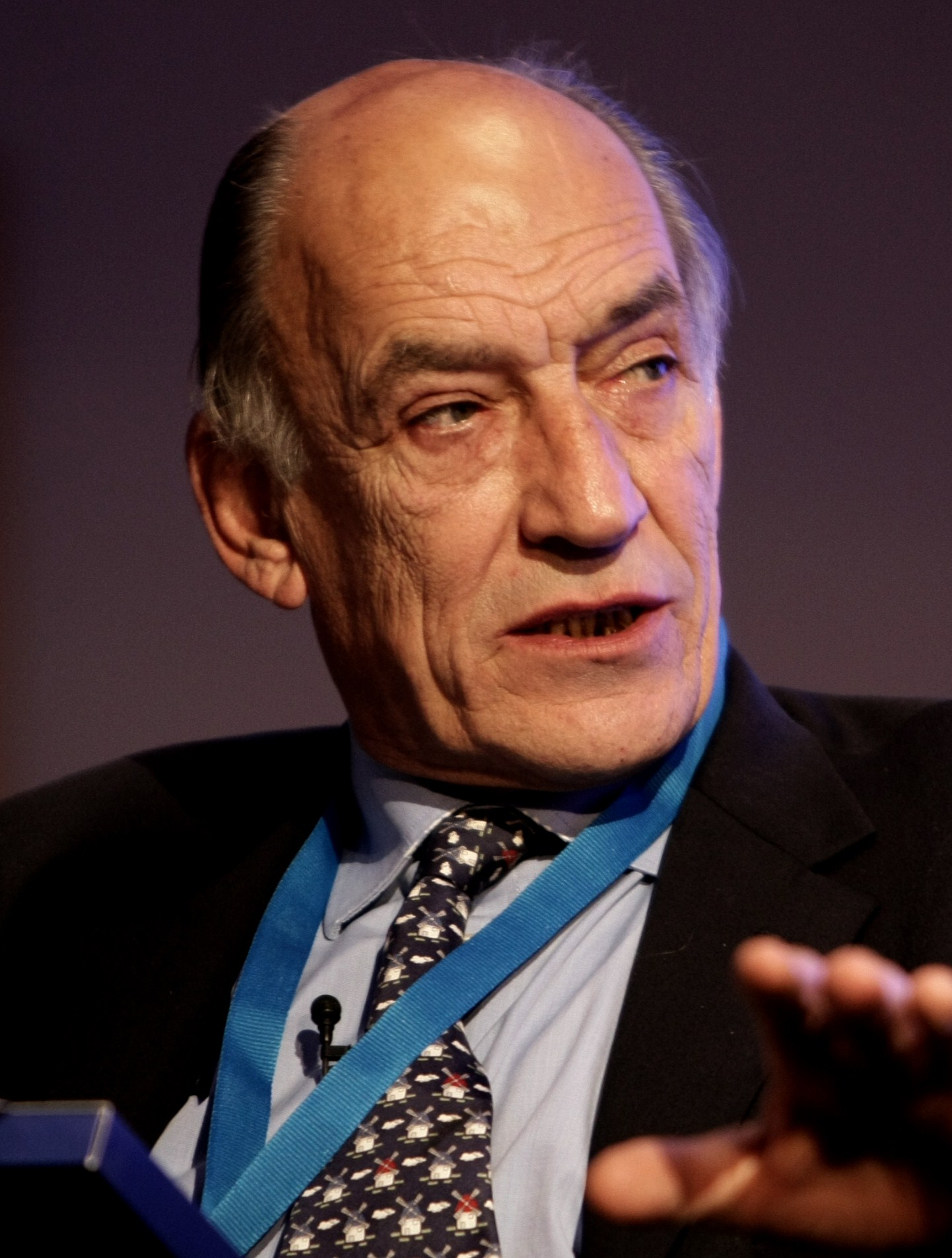
- Jackson in 2009
- Born: 21 March 1944; Sheffield, England
- Died: 15 October 2024 (aged 80)
- Military career
- Allegiance: United Kingdom
- Branch: British Army
- Years of service: 1963–2006
- Rank: General
- Service number: 475176
- Commands: Chief of the General Staff; Land Command; Allied Rapid Reaction Corps; 3rd Mechanised Division; 39th Infantry Brigade; 1st Battalion, Parachute Regiment
- Conflicts: The Troubles; Yugoslav Wars; Kosovo War
- Awards: Knight Grand Cross of the Order of the Bath; Commander of the Order of the British Empire; Companion of the Distinguished Service Order; Mentioned in Despatches
- Other work: Lecturer, consultant

General Sir Michael David Jackson (21 March 1944 – 15 October 2024) was a British Army officer and one of its most high-profile generals since the Second World War. Originally commissioned into the Intelligence Corps in 1963, he transferred to the Parachute Regiment in 1970, with which he served two of his three tours of duty in Northern Ireland. On his first, he was present as an adjutant at the events of the Ballymurphy massacre (1971), where eleven unarmed civilians were shot dead by British troops, and then at Bloody Sunday in 1972, when British soldiers opened fire on unarmed protesters, killing fourteen. On his second, he was a company commander in the aftermath of the Warrenpoint ambush (1979), when the IRA killed 18 soldiers with two roadside bombs, the British Army's heaviest single loss of life during the Troubles. He was assigned to a staff post at the Ministry of Defence (MoD) in 1982 before assuming command of the 1st Battalion, Parachute Regiment, in 1984. Jackson was posted to Northern Ireland for the third time, as a brigade commander, in the early 1990s.

In 1995–1996, Jackson served his first tour in the Balkans, where he commanded a multi-national division of the Implementation Force. Following a staff job in the UK, he was appointed commander of NATO's Allied Rapid Reaction Corps (ARRC) in 1997. He returned to the Balkans with the ARRC during the Kosovo War, during which he famously refused to obey an order from American General Wesley Clark, his immediate superior in the NATO chain of command, to block the runways of Pristina Airport and isolate the Russian contingent that was positioned there. He reportedly told Clark, "I'm not going to start the Third World War for you". The incident attracted controversy, particularly in the United States, and earned Jackson the nickname "Macho Jacko" in the British tabloid press. Jackson established a working relationship with the Russian general commanding the detachment at Pristina, giving him a bottle of whisky, of which Jackson was known to be fond, and providing the Russians with the protection of a squad of British soldiers, commanded by his son, Mark.

Upon his return to the UK, Jackson was promoted to full general and appointed Commander-in-Chief, Land Command, the second-most senior position in the British Army. After three years as commander-in-chief, Jackson was appointed Chief of the General Staff (CGS), the professional head of the British Army, in 2003. He took up the post a month before the start of the Iraq War, amid disputes over the legality of the invasion and claims that the Army was under-equipped. However, he dismissed suggestions that the Army was at "breaking point". The most controversial point of his tenure as CGS was the restructuring of the regiment system and amalgamation of many regiments into larger ones, leading to the loss of historic regiment names. He was succeeded as CGS by General Sir Richard Dannatt in 2006, and retired from the Army after serving for almost 45 years.

== Early life ==
Jackson's father, George, served as a soldier in the Household Cavalry before being commissioned into the Royal Army Service Corps. On D-Day, George Jackson assumed command of a squadron of amphibious landing vehicles after his commanding officer was killed in action, and he was later awarded the Belgian Croix de Guerre and mentioned in despatches for his actions. Jackson was born at his mother's home in Sheffield on 21 March 1944. After the Second World War, George Jackson was eventually posted to Tripoli, Libya, where the family lived for two years, during which time Jackson's younger sister was born. After suffering a heart attack, George retired with the rank of major after 40 years in the Army. Jackson's mother, Ivy (née Bower), was a curator at a museum in Sheffield.

Jackson was educated at various primary schools as the family moved with his father's postings before being sent to Stamford School, an independent boarding school in south Lincolnshire, where he became a house prefect. He joined the school's Combined Cadet Force along with John Drewienkiewicz, who eventually became a major general. By the age of 15 Jackson had decided that he wanted to be a soldier.

== Early military career ==
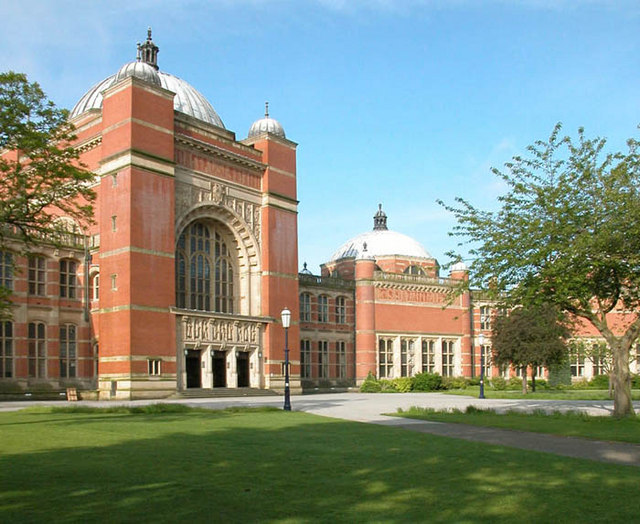
The University of Birmingham where Jackson was educated

Despite being advised by the headmaster at Stamford to consider university, Jackson applied to join the British Army in 1961. He was accepted, and started at the Royal Military Academy, Sandhurst, in January 1962, graduating on 20 December 1963. While at Sandhurst, he became increasingly interested in the Parachute Regiment, but eventually applied to, and was commissioned into, the Intelligence Corps as a second lieutenant at the age of 19. After his commissioning, Jackson took up an opportunity offered by the Intelligence Corps to undertake platoon commanders' training with a combat regiment, and opted to do so with the Parachute Regiment. Before leaving Sandhurst, he had applied to take an "in-service degree", a degree sponsored by the Army at a civilian university, and was accepted to read Russian studies at the University of Birmingham. The course required students to reside in the USSR for several months; as the Ministry of Defence refused to allow Jackson to travel to the country, the university agreed to waive the requirement. Jackson returned to the army after graduation as a Bachelor of Social Sciences in Russian Language and Literature in 1967. His first promotion was to lieutenant on 20 June 1965, and he served with the Parachute Regiment in Malaysia, Hong Kong and Anguilla—where he served as adjutant when his battalion relieved the force sent to restore order during the 1969 emergency—after which he was promoted to the rank of captain. Following Anguilla, his tenure with the Parachute Regiment ended and he reluctantly returned to the Intelligence Corps. He became increasingly determined to rejoin the Parachute Regiment and, after almost a year, was eventually allowed to transfer, retaining the rank of captain in 1970.

Jackson went on to serve in Northern Ireland as adjutant to 1st Battalion, The Parachute Regiment (1 PARA), and was present at the events of the Ballymurphy massacre, where 11 unarmed civilians were shot dead by British troops in August 1971 and at the events of Bloody Sunday, 30 January 1972, when 14 unarmed civilian civil rights protesters were shot dead by soldiers from 1 PARA in Derry. He was in the tactical headquarters of the Army's operation to contain the protests immediately before the Bloody Sunday shooting began and he accompanied the battalion commander, Derek Wilford, when Wilford decided to join the soldiers on the ground. The shooting was over by the time Jackson reached the soldiers' position, but he recalls seeing several bodies in the back of an Army vehicle. In 1976, he was promoted to major and attended the Staff College, Camberley, before being posted to Germany as chief of staff to the Berlin Infantry Brigade. After Berlin, Jackson served his second tour of duty in Northern Ireland, this time as a company commander. While there, he witnessed the aftermath of the 1979 Warrenpoint ambush, the British Army's single largest loss of life during The Troubles. He acted as the incident commander, arriving on the scene shortly after the second explosion, and had to identify Major Peter Fursman, a close friend, from the remains of Fursman's face, which had been blown clear of his skull. He later spoke of the effect the incident had on him, saying, "It greatly disturbed me. Still does". He was appointed Member of the Order of the British Empire (MBE) in the 1979 Queen's Birthday Honours and was mentioned in despatches in 1981, in recognition of his service in Northern Ireland.

Having attended the National Defence College, Jackson joined the directing staff at the Army Staff College and was promoted to lieutenant colonel in 1981. He served as a member of the directing staff at the Staff College, Camberley, for two and a half years. During his tenure at Camberley, he was seconded to a staff position at the Ministry of Defence in 1982 during the Falklands War, and thus missed the opportunity to serve in the conflict directly. He took command of 1 PARA in March 1984, who, at the time, were deployed in Norway, training for the possibility of a Soviet attack. Concerned that he was insufficiently prepared for the weather conditions, he left Camberley early to train with the Royal Marines. He was appointed senior directing staff (army) at the Joint Service Defence College from 1986 to 1988 and was promoted to colonel in 1987.

While serving as a colonel, Jackson considered resigning his commission. He wondered if he had missed his chance for promotion to brigadier at the age of 44, and believed he might have "reached [his] ceiling" as it was unusual for older officers to be selected for promotion. He was persuaded to try again the next year and was promoted to brigadier on 31 December 1989, after spending six months on a Service Fellowship writing a paper on the future of the Army and taking the Higher Command and Staff Course. He went on to serve his third tour in Northern Ireland, commanding 39 Infantry Brigade—a post he held until 1992, thus missing the Gulf War. He was promoted from Member to Commander of the Order of the British Empire (CBE) in 1992.

== High command ==
Jackson attained general officer status with promotion to acting major general in May 1992, after holding only one post as a brigadier; in peacetime, senior officers are normally expected to have held two posts before promotion. He was appointed Director General Personal Services (Army) at the Ministry of Defence, reporting to the adjutant general. He was granted the substantive rank of major general in June 1992, with his promotion backdated to October 1991. After two years at the MoD, Jackson took command of the 3rd Mechanised Division in April 1994. During the Yugoslav Wars in 1995, Jackson had been due to succeed Rupert Smith as commander of the United Nations Protection Force (UNPROFOR), which would have entailed early promotion to lieutenant general (three-star rank) and a blue beret, signifying UN command. As a result of the Dayton Agreement, however, UNPROFOR became the NATO-led Implementation Force (IFOR), and Jackson remained a major general (two-star rank), commanding the 3rd Division and troops from several other countries who made up Multinational Division South-West. Jackson retained command of the 3rd Division until July 1996 and went on to serve briefly in a staff post as the Army's director general of development and doctrine. He was appointed Companion of the Order of the Bath (CB) in November 1996.

After he was appointed commander of NATO's Allied Rapid Reaction Corps (ARRC), Jackson was promoted to acting lieutenant general in January 1997, a rank he was granted substantively in April 1997. Jackson served in the NATO chain of command, reporting to the Supreme Allied Commander Europe, American four-star General Wesley Clark. Under Jackson's command, the ARRC deployed to Bosnia and Herzegovina in March 1999, where Jackson served his second tour of duty in the Balkans, commanding KFOR, NATO's multi-national peacekeeping force established at the end of the Kosovo War. He gained significant media attention in June 1999 after a confrontation with Clark in which he backed Captain James Blunt's refusal to block the runways of the Russian-occupied Pristina Airport and isolate the Russian troops there, thus preventing them from flying in reinforcements. In one heated discussion with Clark, Jackson reputedly told him "I'm not going to start the Third World War for you". He later told the BBC he believed that obeying the order would have led to the possibility of an armed confrontation with Russian troops, which he felt was not "the right way to start off a relationship with Russians". The point became moot when the US government prevailed upon neighbouring countries, including Hungary and Romania, to prevent Russian use of their airspace to fly in reinforcements. Jackson was criticised for his actions by American military officers and politicians, including General Hugh Shelton, Chairman of the Joint Chiefs of Staff, who called the incident "troubling", and Senator John Warner, who accused Jackson of insubordination.

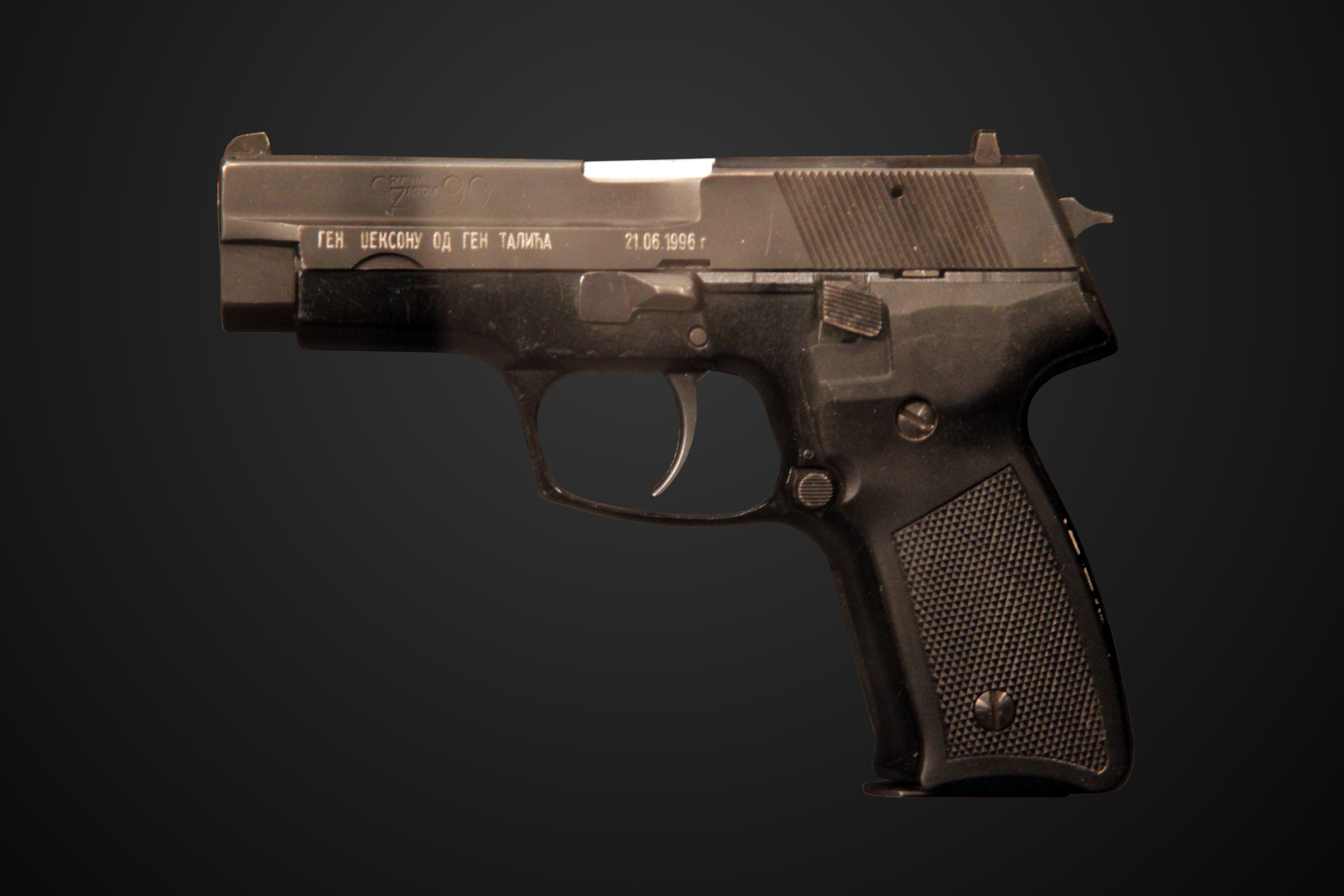
Zastava CZ-99 pistol presented to Jackson by Bosnian Serb general Momir Talić when commanding British troops in the ex-Yugoslavian theatre in the late 1990s. On display at the Parachute Regiment exhibition of the Imperial War Museum in Duxford.

As a result of the incident at Pristina Airport, Jackson was dubbed "Macho Jacko" by the British press. Among his troops, Jackson was christened "Darth Vader" and "Prince of Darkness", owing to his temper and gravelly voice. Following the confrontation with Clark, Jackson went to the airport to meet Viktor Zavarzin, the Russian general leading the detachment, and established a working relationship with him. Jackson, who was fond of whisky and cigars, discovered that the Russian troops were apprehensive about being attacked by the Kosovo Liberation Army, and promised to protect the Russians by sending a detachment of British soldiers commanded by his son Mark, along with a bottle of whisky. Jackson was knighted when he was appointed Knight Commander of the Order of the Bath (KCB) in 1998, and was appointed a Companion of the Distinguished Service Order (DSO) in 1999 for his leadership in Kosovo.

Upon his return to the British chain of command in early 2000, he assumed the position of Commander-in-Chief, Land Command, the second-highest position in the British Army, and a post which entailed promotion to full general and membership of the Army Board. As commander-in-chief, Jackson was responsible for assembling forces for the 2000 British intervention in Sierra Leone, which included Brigadier David Richards—later Chief of the Defence Staff—and Jackson's son Mark. He also handled requests from the civilian authorities for assistance with the foot-and-mouth disease crisis, floods and strikes by firefighters and fuel tanker drivers. While still commander-in-chief, he stood in for the Chief of the General Staff, marching behind the coffin at the state funeral of Queen Elizabeth The Queen Mother, in 2002. At the time of the 11 September 2001 attacks, Jackson was on a visit to the British training facility in Alberta, Canada. He managed to return to the UK the next day aboard a casualty evacuation aircraft and had overall responsibility for force generation for the British Army's contribution to the subsequent wars in Afghanistan and Iraq.

=== Chief of the General Staff ===
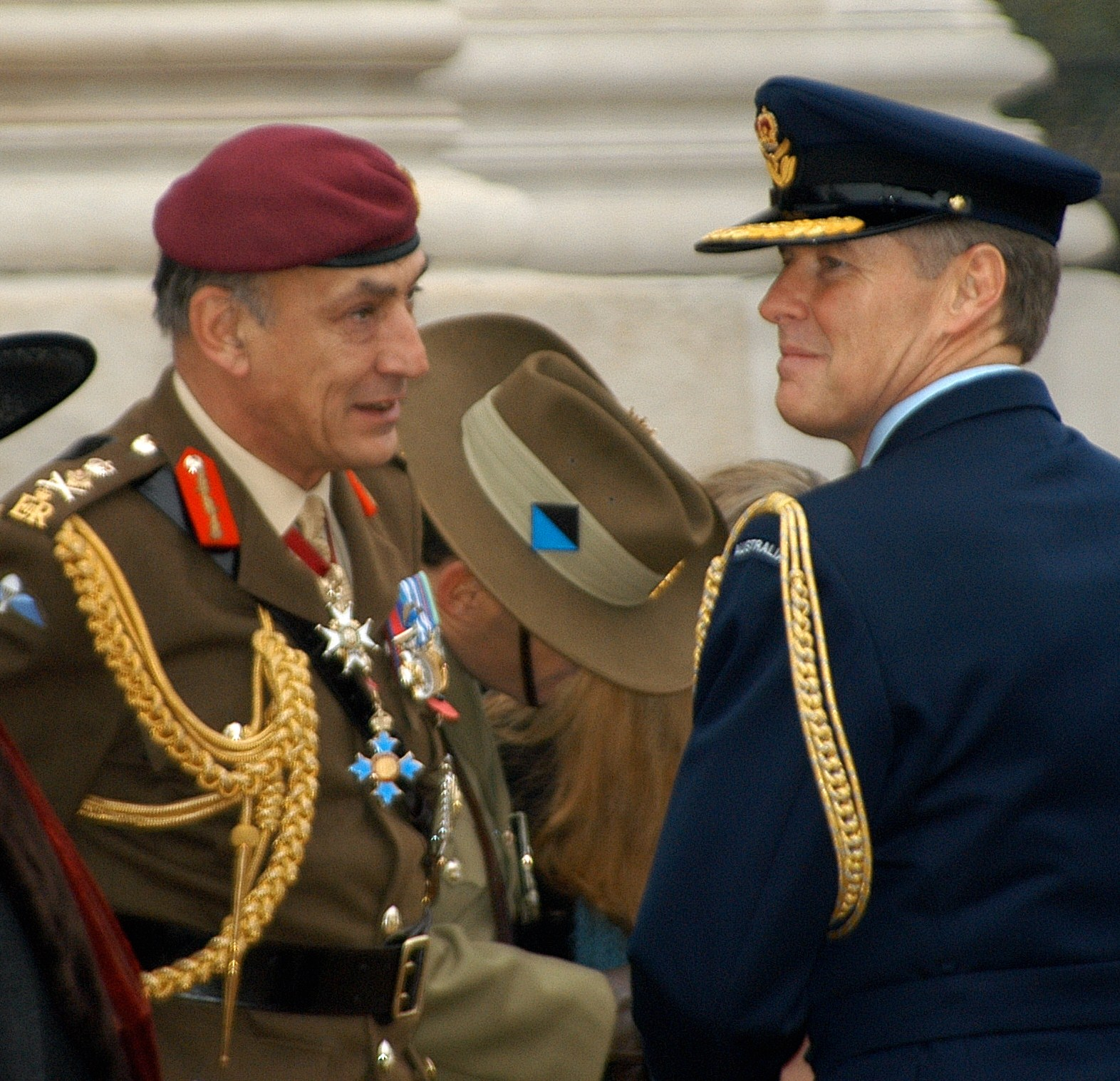
Jackson (left) in conversation with a Royal Australian Air Force officer at the Cenotaph in London on Remembrance Day 2003

Jackson succeeded General Sir Michael Walker as Chief of the General Staff (CGS)—the professional head of, and highest post in, the British Army—on 1 February 2003, just over a month before the 2003 invasion of Iraq. He later said that he "did his homework" in researching the disputed legality of the war and had convinced himself that the invasion was legal. Shortly after the invasion of Iraq, Jackson ordered an inquiry into the alleged abuse of Iraqi prisoners by British soldiers. He admitted that the allegations had damaged the Army's reputation, but believed that further damage would be done by covering them up. Several soldiers were eventually convicted in connection with the abuse, after which Jackson publicly apologised on behalf of the British Army and promised to appoint an officer to determine what lessons needed to be learnt. Weeks after becoming CGS, Jackson was summoned to give evidence before the Bloody Sunday Inquiry.

The most controversial action of Jackson's tenure as CGS was the Army's modernisation of the regimental structure in 2004, in which many regiments were merged to form larger ones. The amalgamations led to the loss of many regimental names, including the Devonshire and Dorset Regiment, which became part of The Rifles and the Black Watch, which, after intervention by Queen Elizabeth II, retained its name but became a battalion of the Royal Regiment of Scotland. Jackson insisted that the change was necessary to give the Army greater flexibility and capability, but said he was "acutely aware that this will be sad and unwelcome news for at least some of the infantry". As part of the same review, the arms plot system, which kept infantry units moving around every few years, was also phased out as being inefficient.

During the Iraq War Jackson admitted that the war was putting the service under strain, but called the claim that the Army was "at breaking point", "nonsense". Jackson was dismissive of claims that the Army was under-equipped, recalling his conversation with a soldier: "There's a bit of a fuss going on about boots and bog rolls and whatnot. Are you all right for boots?" He later conceded that this could be seen as "cavalier", and that he "had no intention of belittling the gravity of the situation", but that he "didn't want to send a message to the enemy that we were in any way not ready". Known for speaking his mind, Jackson attracted media attention towards the end of his tenure as CGS in 2006, when he criticised Norman Kember for his apparent lack of gratitude to the soldiers who freed him from Iraqi kidnappers.

Jackson was promoted to Knight Grand Cross of the Order of the Bath (GCB) in December 2004 in the New Year Honours List. His investiture took place immediately after the awarding of the Victoria Cross to Johnson Beharry, as the VC takes precedence over all other awards. Speaking of Beharry's award, Jackson said he had "never felt more proud of the British Army", and following the investiture said that he was "overshadowed" by Beharry, "and quite rightly so—it was an honour to stand alongside him". He was present at the 2006 Sovereign's Parade at RMA Sandhurst, in which Prince Harry was commissioned—the first Sovereign's Parade to be attended by Elizabeth II in 15 years. One of the most high-profile British Army generals since the Second World War, Jackson was succeeded as Chief of the General Staff by Sir Richard Dannatt and retired from active service in August 2006 after almost 45 years of service.

=== Honorary roles ===
Jackson held a number of honorary and ceremonial positions in various regiments. His first was as honorary colonel, 10 (Volunteer) Battalion, The Parachute Regiment in 1994, which he relinquished in 1999. In 1998 he was appointed colonel commandant of the Parachute Regiment, until he was relieved by Sir John Reith in 2004, and colonel commandant, Adjutant General's Corps, succeeding Sir Jeremy Mackenzie, until he was relieved by Sir Freddie Viggers in 2005.

He was appointed honorary colonel of the Territorial Army's 2nd Battalion (Volunteers) The Royal Gloucestershire, Berkshire and Wiltshire Regiment, in 1997. Following their amalgamation in the modernisation of the regimental structure, Jackson was appointed to the newly created position of honorary colonel, the Rifle Volunteers, in 1999. He was given the title of aide de camp general (ADC) to Queen Elizabeth II in 2001, succeeding Sir Rupert Smith. He relinquished the appointment in 2006. After Jackson's retirement from the Army, he was appointed Deputy Lieutenant of Wiltshire (DL) in 2007.

== Retirement ==
Jackson retired in 2006. He spent nearly 45 years in the Army but called it "a regret" that he never fought in a conventional battle, having been in a staff position in 1982 during the Falklands War and having served as a brigade commander in Northern Ireland during the Gulf War. He said that "Fighting is what a young man with good red blood in his veins joins for. It is the ultimate test for the professional soldier". He continued to voice opinions on military matters in his retirement. He delivered the annual Richard Dimbleby Lecture four months after leaving the Army. In the lecture, titled The Defence of The Realm in the 21st Century, he criticised the Ministry of Defence and questioned the MoD's understanding of the fundamental ethos of the armed forces. He was critical of the treatment of soldiers, calling some soldiers' accommodation "frankly shaming" and saying that the "Armed Forces' contract with the nation ... must be a two-way one", going on to say that "military operations cost in blood and treasure, because risk-free soldiering, which some seem to think is possible, is simply a contradiction in terms". The MoD responded by saying that "while we do not agree with everything Sir Mike has said, we are always the first to recognise—for example in relation to medical services and accommodation—that although we have delivered real improvements, there is more we can do".

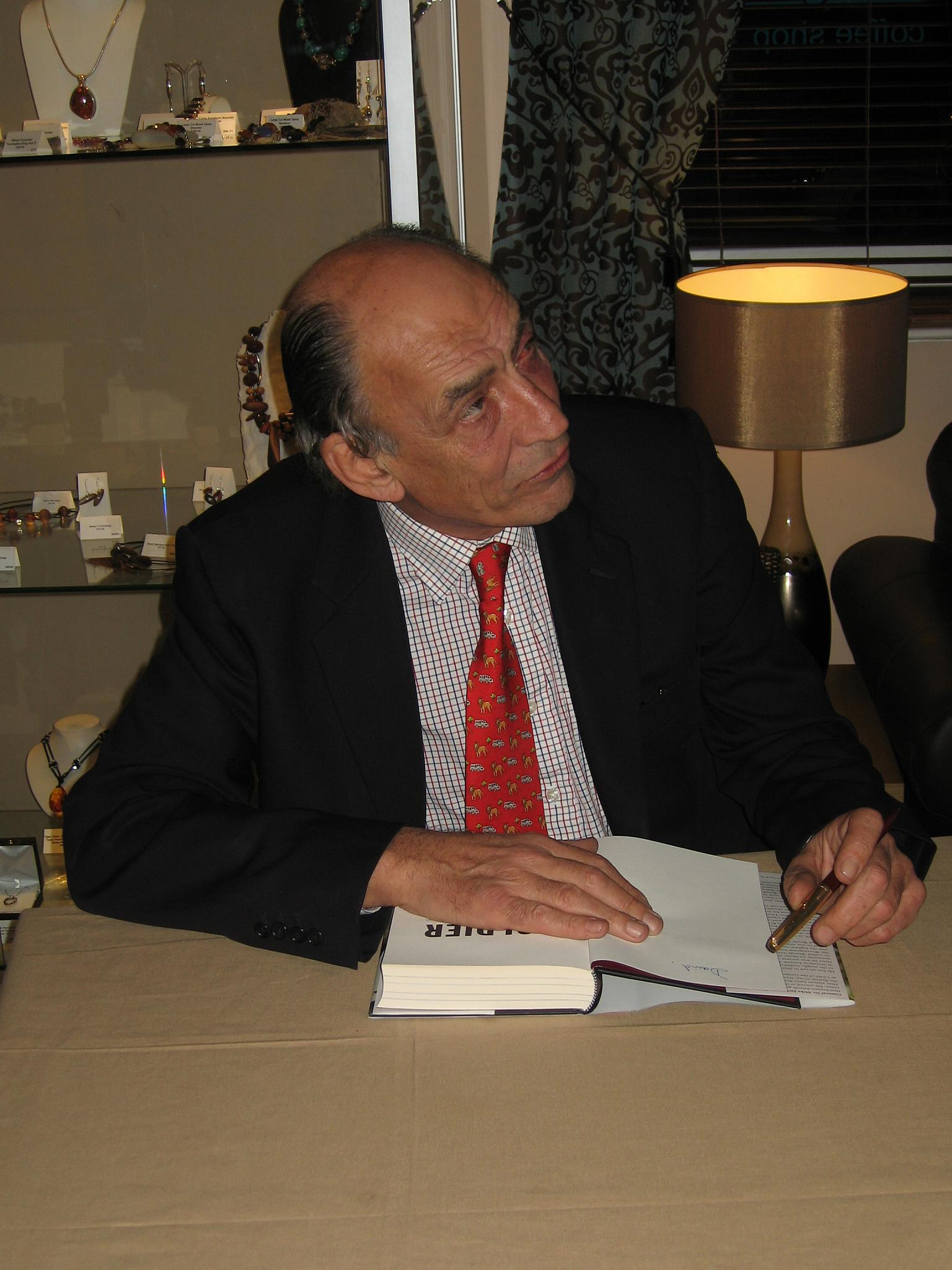
Jackson signing a copy of his autobiography Soldier in 2008

At the end of 2006 Jackson took up a consultancy job with PA Consulting Group, and he gave lectures on leadership. He also serves as a non-executive director for ForceSelect and security company Legion and was a member of Rolls-Royce's International Advisory Board. His autobiography, Soldier, was published in 2007 by Transworld. Gary Sheffield, writing in The Independent, called the book "an engaging and honest account that would repay reading by all those who seek to understand the 21st-century British Army", but Peter Beaumont, foreign affairs editor for The Observer, called it "disappointing" and commented that "in the end it is Jackson's opinions ... rather than any powerful new detail that emerges". He suspected that the book had been heavily edited by the army's lawyers. Determined to keep active in retirement, Jackson recalled advice he had been given by a friend—"whatever you do, don't settle for pruning the roses or soon enough you'll be pushing them up". He appeared on BBC Radio 4's series Great Lives, along with Major General Julian Thompson, RM, in 2008 and nominated Field Marshal Bill Slim. Jackson sat on the Board of Trustees of the John Smith Memorial Trust, a charity set up in 1995 in memory of the late Labour party leader John Smith.

Jackson re-appeared in the headlines when he and other retired generals, including Major General Tim Cross, who was involved in the planning effort and later commanded all British troops in Iraq, criticised the American post-war planning for Iraq and attacked the statement by Donald Rumsfeld, US Secretary of Defense, at the time of the invasion, that the US does not "do nation-building", calling it "nonsensical" and "intellectually bankrupt". Jackson also joined criticism of the British National Party (BNP) in the midst of the 2009 controversy surrounding party leader Nick Griffin's appearance on the panel show Question Time. He accused the BNP of "hijacking" military symbols, saying "the BNP is claiming that it has a better relationship with the Armed Forces than other political parties. How dare they use the image of the Army, in particular, to promote their policies?" He elaborated that it was not a party political issue, but an issue of the armed forces' reputation. Griffin retaliated by calling Jackson and Sir Richard Dannatt "war criminals". A disagreement between Jackson and then Defence Secretary Bob Ainsworth made headlines in 2009, when Ainsworth stated that the UK could only manage a small increase to troop numbers in Afghanistan, saying that the Army had pushed "too hard" when it was engaged in operation in both Iraq and Afghanistan. Jackson countered by saying that the UK should play a decisive role and that the drawdown of troops from Iraq meant the UK had the capability for a larger increase.

After the Saville Report published its findings in June 2010, Jackson gave an interview in which he joined the Prime Minister, David Cameron in offering a "fulsome apology" for the events. He acknowledged that troops of the First Parachute Battalion, of which he was adjutant, had killed people "without justification", but went on to observe that "Northern Ireland is a very different place [in 2010], not least because of sacrifices made" by the soldiers who had served there, and asked that the report "be seen in this context".

In 2019 Jackson was a contributor to the British documentary series Rise of the Nazis.

== Personal life and death ==
Jackson married while at university in 1966. The marriage produced two children (Amanda and Mark) before ending in a divorce in the early 1980s. He married again in 1985, to Sarah (née Coombe), whom he met when they debated the Falklands War at a dinner party in 1984. The couple had a son, Tom, in 1990. Jackson's daughter Amanda is a mother of four. Mark Jackson joined the Army and served under his father's command in Kosovo.

Jackson was well known for having large bags under his eyes, which he had surgically removed shortly after his retirement. He stated that it was a matter of "vision, not vanity", as the bags had been impairing his sight. Jackson listed his interests as music, reading, travel, skiing, and tennis. He was also known for his rich, gravelly voice, described as "fine-tuned by whisky and cheroots".

Jackson died from prostate cancer on 15 October 2024, at the age of 80.

Military offices
Preceded by Hew Pike	General Officer Commanding the 3rd Mechanised Division; 1994–1996	Succeeded by Cedric Delves
New title	Commander Multi-National Division (South-West), Bosnia; 1995–1996	Succeeded by John Kiszely
Preceded by Sir Michael Walker	Commander Allied Rapid Reaction Corps; 1997–2000	Succeeded by Sir Chris Drewry
Preceded by Sir Michael Walker	Commander-in-Chief, Land Command; 2000–2003	Succeeded by Sir Timothy Granville-Chapman
Preceded by Sir Michael Walker	Chief of the General Staff; 2003–2006	Succeeded by Sir Richard Dannatt
