= Redmond Watt =

British Army general (born 1950)

General Sir Redmond Watt KCB KCVO CBE DL
- Born: 1950 (age 75–76)
- Military career
- Allegiance: United Kingdom
- Branch: British Army
- Service years: 1972–2008
- Rank: General
- Service number: 494336
- Unit: Welsh Guards
- Commands: Land Command; HQ Northern Ireland; Field Army; London District; 1st (UK) Armoured Division; 3rd Infantry Brigade; 1st Battalion, Welsh Guards
- Conflicts: Operation Banner; Bosnian War
- Awards: Knight Commander of the Order of the Bath; Knight Commander of the Royal Victorian Order; Commander of the Order of the British Empire

General Sir Charles Redmond "Reddy" Watt, KCB, KCVO, CBE, DL (born 1950) is a retired senior British Army officer who served as Commander-in-Chief, Land Command from 2006 to 2008. He was also the Governor of the Royal Hospital Chelsea from 2011 to 2018.

== Military career ==
Reddy Watt was educated at Eton College and Christ Church, Oxford, and was commissioned into the Welsh Guards in 1972. He passed through the Staff College, Camberley in 1982, and also completed the Higher Command and Staff Course. Promoted to lieutenant colonel on 30 June 1988, he became commanding officer of the 1st Battalion, Welsh Guards in 1990. He was promoted to brigadier on 30 June 1993 and served as commander of the 3rd Infantry Brigade from 1994 to 1995, was appointed a Commander of the Order of the British Empire in 1996, and was then made Director of Studies and Deputy Commandant (Land) of the Joint Service Command and Staff College in 1997. On 17 August 1998 he was promoted to major general and became General Officer Commanding the 1st (UK) Armoured Division, which deployed to Bosnia as Headquarters Multi-National Division (South-West).

Watt became Major-General commanding the Household Division and General Officer Commanding London District in 2000, in which capacity he had a significant role in the funeral of the Queen Mother in 2002. He became Commander Field Army in 2003, and was knighted as a Knight Commander of the Royal Victorian Order in 2004. In 2005 he was appointed General Officer Commanding Northern Ireland: in this role he advocated long-term planning and indicated that such lessons might be applied to Iraq. From 2006 to 2008 he was Commander-in-Chief, Land Command. He was appointed a Knight Commander of the Order of the Bath in 2008, and retired from the army later that year.

== Later career ==
In retirement Watt has become President of the charity Combat Stress. In 2011 he also became Governor of the Royal Hospital Chelsea. He is a Deputy Lieutenant of Berkshire.

Military offices
Preceded by John Kiszely	General Officer Commanding 1st (UK) Armoured Division; 1998–2000	Succeeded by Robin Brims
Preceded by Cedric Delves	Commander Multi-National Division (South-West), Bosnia; 1998–1999	Succeeded by Freddie Viggers
Preceded by Sir Evelyn Webb-Carter	General Officer Commanding London District; 2000–2003	Succeeded by Sir Sebastian Roberts
Preceded by Sir Cedric Delves	Commander Field Army; 2003–2005	Succeeded by Robin Brims
Preceded by Sir Philip Trousdell	General Officer Commanding British Army in Northern Ireland; 2005–2006	Succeeded by Nick Parker
Preceded by Sir Richard Dannatt	Commander-in-Chief, Land Command; 2006–2008	Succeeded by Sir David Richards
Honorary titles
Preceded by Lord Walker	Governor, Royal Hospital Chelsea; 2011–2018	Succeeded by Sir Adrian Bradshaw
