= Angus Ramsay =

British Army general

Major General Angus Ramsay CBE DSO
- Born: 1946 (age 79–80)
- Spouse: Victoria Clare Lanyon
- Military career
- Allegiance: United Kingdom
- Branch: British Army
- Service years: 1964–2000
- Rank: Major General
- Commands: British Forces Cyprus (1998–2000); Multi-National Division (South-West) (1997); Ulster Defence Regiment (1990–1992)
- Conflicts: The Troubles; Dhofar Rebellion; Bosnian War
- Awards: Commander of the Order of the British Empire; Distinguished Service Order

Major General Angus Iain Ramsay, CBE, DSO (born 1946) is a former British Army officer who served as Commander British Forces Cyprus from 1998 to 2000.

== Military career ==
Ramsay was commissioned into the Royal Highland Fusiliers in 1964. He commanded a rifle company of the Sultan of Oman's Armed Forces during the Dhofar Rebellion and became commanding officer of the Ulster Defence Regiment in 1990 during the Troubles. He went on to become Chief of Staff at the Sovereign Base Areas in Cyprus in 1992, chief of staff of the United Nations Force in Bosnia in 1993 and commander of the Multi-National Division (South-West) in Bosnia in 1997 before becoming Commander of British Forces Cyprus and Administrator of the Sovereign Base Areas in 1998. He retired in 2000.

Military offices
Preceded by Evelyn Webb-Carter	Commander Multi-National Division (South-West), Bosnia; May–November 1997	Succeeded by Andrew Pringle
Preceded by Peter Millar	Commander British Forces Cyprus; 1998–2000	Succeeded by Thomas Rimmer
