= Evelyn Webb-Carter =

British Army general

Major General Sir Evelyn Webb-Carter KCVO OBE DL
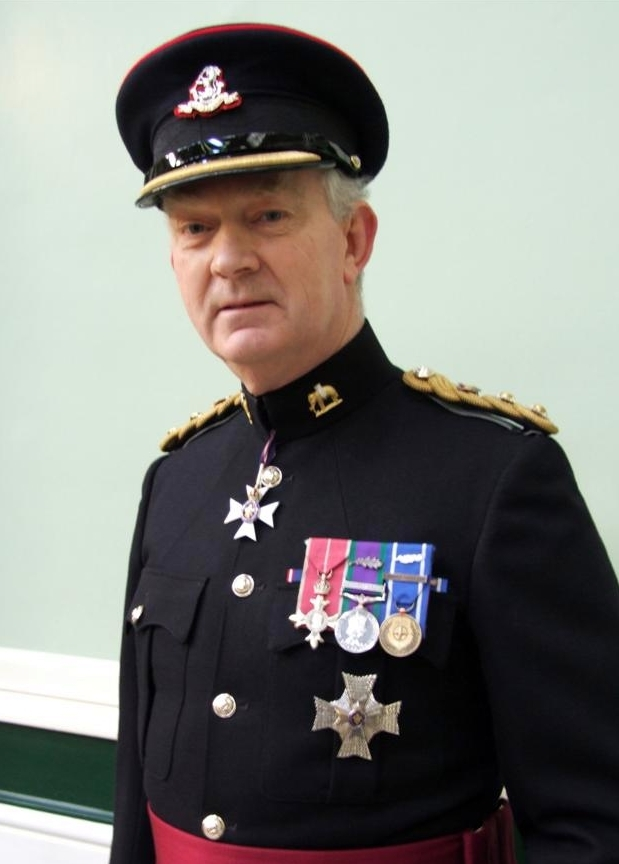
- Born: 30 January 1946 (age 80)
- Military career
- Allegiance: United Kingdom
- Branch: British Army
- Service years: 1964–2001
- Rank: Major General
- Service number: 481893
- Commands: London District; Household Division; Multi-National Division (South-West); 19th Infantry Brigade
- Conflicts: Operation Banner; Bosnian War
- Awards: Knight Commander of the Royal Victorian Order; Officer of the Order of the British Empire; Mentioned in Despatches; Queen's Commendation for Valuable Service

Major General Sir Evelyn John Webb-Carter, KCVO, OBE, DL (born 30 January 1946) is a retired senior British Army officer. He was the last 'Colonel of the Regiment' of the Duke of Wellington's Regiment (West Riding) (1999–2006), before their amalgamation into the Yorkshire Regiment, 3rd Battalion (Duke of Wellington's).

== Early life ==
Webb-Carter is the son of Brigadier Brian Wolseley Webb-Carter (1920–1981). He was educated at Wellington College in Berkshire, before joining the Royal Military Academy in Sandhurst.

== Military career ==
Webb-Carter was commissioned into the Grenadier Guards in 1964, and was mentioned in despatches for service in Northern Ireland in 1980. In 1991 he became commander of the 19th Infantry Brigade and in late 1996 he was appointed the commander of the Multi-National Division (South-West) for the Stabilisation Force in Bosnia.

In June 1997, Webb-Carter was appointed Major-General commanding the Household Division and General Officer Commanding London District, where he gained a strong reputation for tackling racism in the Guards Division. He was the chairman of Queen Elizabeth, the Queen Mother's 100th birthday celebrations in 2000, and retired in 2001.

Webb-Carter was a Controller of the Army Benevolent Fund, a British charity set up to provide help for former British soldiers and their families who are in need of assistance.

== Family ==
Webb-Carter married Anne Celia Wigram (born 1945), the second daughter of Lieutenant Colonel Neville Wigram, 2nd Baron Wigram, in 1973.

Military offices
Preceded by John Kiszely	Commander Multi-National Division (South-West), Bosnia; 1996–1997	Succeeded by Angus Ramsay
Preceded by Sir Iain Mackay-Dick	GOC London District; 1997–2000	Succeeded by Sir Redmond Watt
