= Robin Brims =

British Army general

Lieutenant General Robin Brims CB CBE DSO DL
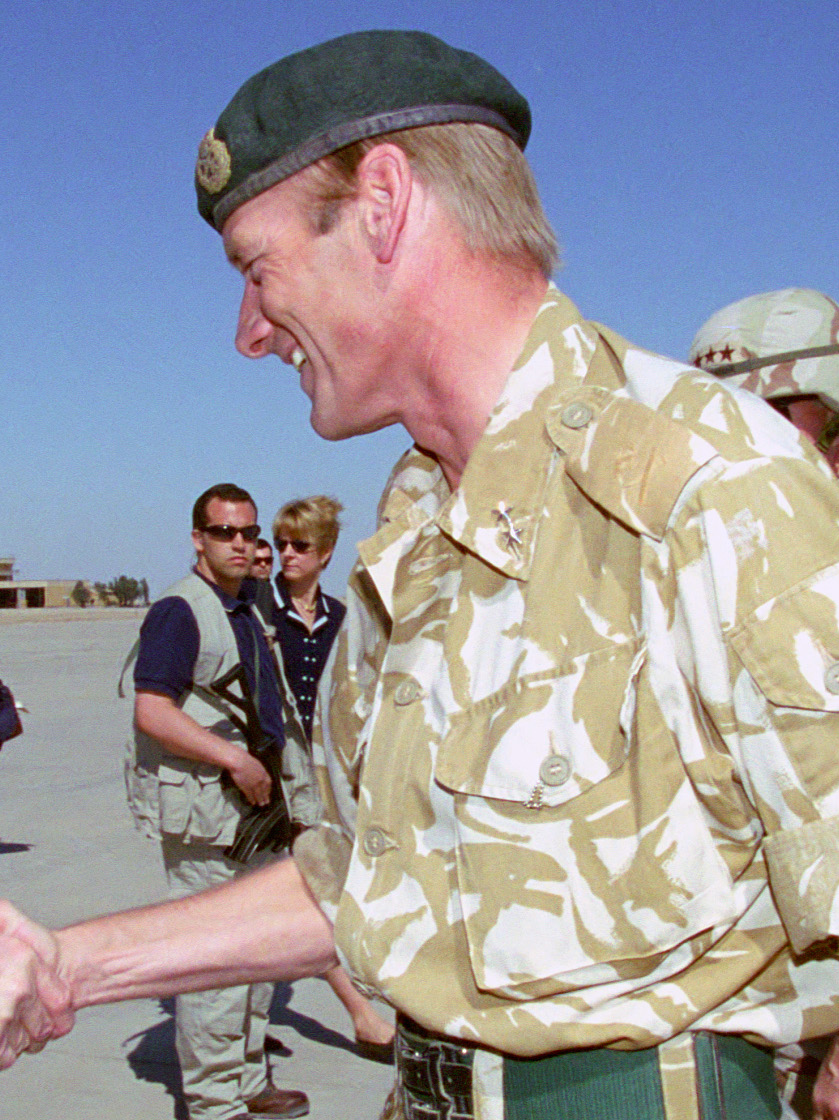
- Brims in 2003
- Born: 27 June 1951 (age 75); Newcastle upon Tyne, England
- Military career
- Allegiance: United Kingdom
- Branch: British Army
- Service years: 1970–2008
- Rank: Lieutenant General
- Service number: 490334
- Unit: The Light Infantry
- Commands: Field Army; 1st (UK) Armoured Division; 24 Airmobile Brigade; 3rd Battalion, The Light Infantry
- Conflicts: Bosnian War; Iraq War
- Awards: Companion of the Order of the Bath; Commander of the Order of the British Empire; Distinguished Service Order

Lieutenant General Robin Vaughan Brims, CB, CBE, DSO, DL (born 27 June 1951) is a retired British Army officer. He was Commander of the Field Army at Land Command from 2005 to 2007.

== Early life ==
Brims was born and grew up in Newcastle upon Tyne. He was educated at Winchester College.

== Military career ==
Brims was commissioned into The Light Infantry in 1970. After various military appointments, he took command of the 3rd Battalion The Light Infantry in 1989. He then took up an appointment at the Ministry of Defence, before taking command of 24 Airmobile Brigade in December 1994. He deployed to Bosnia as part of the Allied Rapid Reaction Corps the following year.

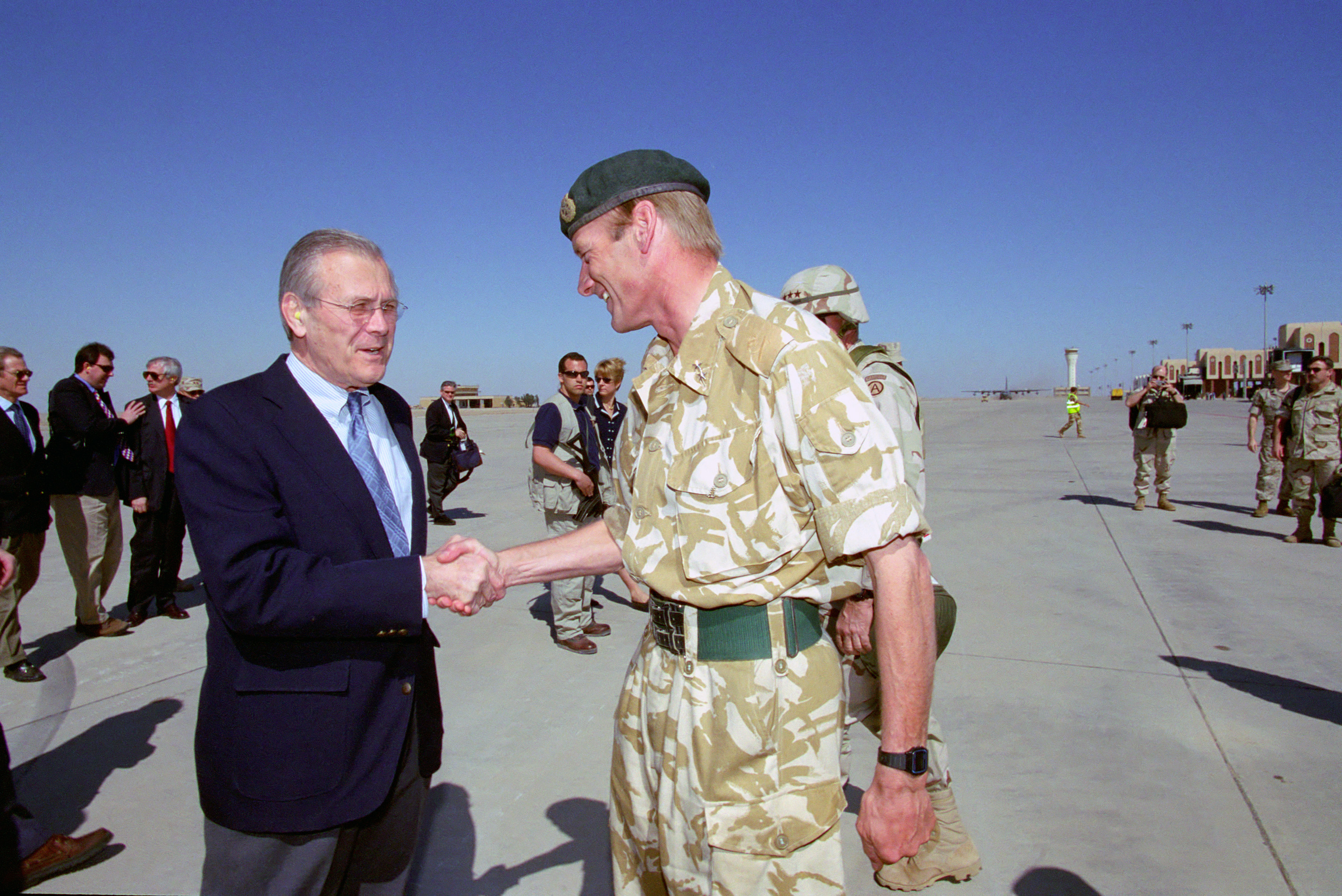
Brims (right) greeting Donald Rumsfeld, US Secretary of Defense, in Iraq in 2003

Brims went on to be Chief of Staff at Headquarters Northern Ireland in November 1996 and then Director of Plans & Resources in January 1999. He was appointed Commander of the Multi-National Division (South-West) in Bosnia in 2000, after which he became General Officer Commanding 1st (UK) Armoured Division in November 2000, deploying to Iraq in 2003 where he took part in the capture of Basra during the initial invasion. For his service in Iraq he was awarded the Distinguished Service Order. He became Deputy Chief of Operations at Permanent Joint Headquarters, Northwood, before being deployed as Senior British Military Representative and Deputy Commanding General, Multinational Force, Iraq in April 2005. He became Commander of the Field Army later that year and retired from active duty in January 2008.

== Later life ==
Brims is a Deputy Lieutenant of Tyne and Wear and, in 2017, was High Sheriff of Tyne and Wear.

In October 2021, he was elected a member of the General Synod of the Church of England.

Military offices
Preceded by Freddie Viggers	Commander Multi-National Division (South-West), Bosnia; January–September 2000	Succeeded by Rick Hillier
Preceded by Redmond Watt	General Officer Commanding 1st (UK) Armoured Division; 2000–2003	Succeeded by Peter Wall
Preceded by John Kiszely	Senior British Military Representative and Deputy Commanding General, Multinational Force, Iraq; April–October 2005	Succeeded by Nick Houghton
Preceded by Sir Redmond Watt	Commander Field Army; 2005–2007	Succeeded by Sir Graeme Lamb
