= Thomas Rimmer (RAF officer) =

Air Vice-Marshal Thomas Rimmer CB OBE FRAeS FRGS
- Born: 16 December 1948 (age 77)
- Military career
- Allegiance: United Kingdom
- Branch: Royal Air Force
- Service years: 1971–2004
- Rank: Air Vice-Marshal
- Commands: British Forces Cyprus (2000–03); Royal Air Force College Cranwell (1998–00); RAF Cottesmore (1990–92)
- Awards: Companion of the Order of the Bath; Officer of the Order of the British Empire; Queen's Commendation for Valuable Service in the Air

Air Vice-Marshal Thomas William "Bill" Rimmer, CB, OBE, FRAeS, FRGS (born 16 December 1948) is a former Royal Air Force officer who served as Commander of British Forces Cyprus.

== RAF career ==
Educated at Morrison's Academy and at the University of Edinburgh, Rimmer joined the Royal air Force in 1971. He became Head of the RAF Presentation Team in 1989, Station Commander at RAF Cottesmore in 1990 and Senior UK Military Officer at the Western European Union in 1992. He went on to be Commandant of the Royal Air Force College Cranwell in 1998 and Commander British Forces Cyprus and Administrator of the Sovereign Base Areas in 2000 before retiring in 2004.

Military offices
Preceded by Angus Ramsay	Commander British Forces Cyprus; 2000–2003	Succeeded by Peter Pearson
