= Multi-National Division (South-West) (Bosnia) =

- Active: 1995–2004
- Country: United Kingdom
- Type: Command
- Part of: IFOR; SFOR
- Garrison/HQ: Banja Luka

The Multi-National Division (South-West) was a military formation which formed part of IFOR, a NATO-led multinational peacekeeping force in Bosnia and Herzegovina under a one-year mandate from 20 December 1995 to 20 December 1996, and then formed part of SFOR, another NATO-led multinational peacekeeping force, from 20 December 1996 until June 2004.

== Role ==
The division's role, passed down to it by IFOR, was to implement the military Annexes of The General Framework Agreement for Peace (GFAP) in Bosnia and Herzegovina – specifically in the South-West Sector. From December 1996, the role passed down by SFOR was to "deter hostilities and stabilise the peace, contribute to a secure environment by providing a continued military presence in the Area Of Responsibility (AOR), target and coordinate SFOR support to key areas including primary civil implementation organisations, and progress towards a lasting consolidation of peace, without further need for NATO-led forces in Bosnia and Herzegovina" – again specifically in the South-West Sector.

== Component units ==
The division was based at Banja Luka and was British led: the British codename for its involvement in IFOR was Operation Resolute and for its involvement in SFOR was Operation Lodestar. Multi-National Division (South-West) included a British brigade (4th Mechanized Brigade from October 1995, 1st Mechanized Brigade from April 1996, 20th Armoured Brigade from October 1996 and 7th Armoured Brigade from April 1997) as well as Canadian and Dutch units.

Division headquarters was provided by 3 (UK) Division from December 1995 until June 1996 and again in January 1998 to August 1998; Division headquarters was provided by 1st (UK) Armoured Division from June 1996 to December 1996 and again from August 1998 to March 1999.

== Commanders ==
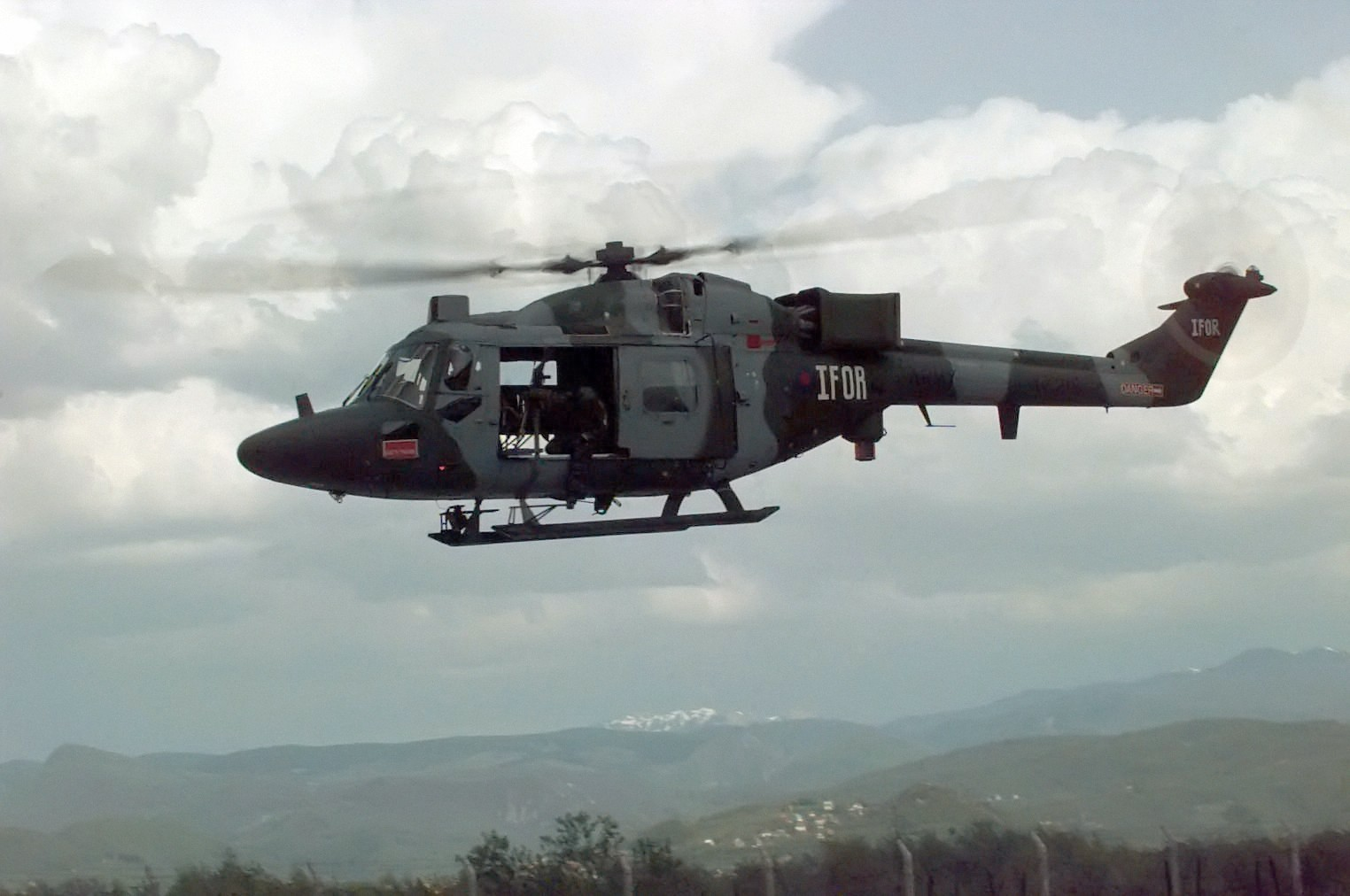
British Lynx Helicopter in Bosnia, May 1996

Commanders were as follows:

- December 1995 – June 1996 Major-General Mike Jackson
- June 1996 – December 1996 Major-General John Kiszely
- December 1996 – May 1997 Major-General Evelyn Webb-Carter
- May 1997 – November 1997 Major-General Angus Ramsay
- November 1997 – January 1998 Major-General Andrew Pringle
- January 1998 – August 1998 Major-General Cedric Delves
- August 1998 – March 1999 Major-General Redmond Watt
- March 1999 – January 2000 Major-General Freddie Viggers
- January 2000 – September 2000 Major-General Robin Brims
- September 2000 – September 2001 Major-General Rick Hillier
- September 2001 – September 2002 Major-General Tony van Diepenbrugge

== Sources ==
- Lord, Cliff (2004). Royal Corps of Signals: Unit Histories of the Corps (1920–2001) and its Antecedents. Helion & Company. ISBN 978-1874622925.
