= John Kiszely =

British Army general

Lieutenant General Sir John Kiszely KCB MC DL
- Born: 2 April 1948 (age 78)
- Military career
- Allegiance: United Kingdom
- Branch: British Army
- Service years: 1968–2008
- Rank: Lieutenant General
- Service number: 486680
- Commands: Defence Academy of the United Kingdom; Regional Forces; Multi-National Division (South-West); 1st (UK) Armoured Division; 7th Armoured Brigade; 1st Battalion Scots Guards
- Conflicts: Falklands War; Bosnian War; Iraq War
- Awards: Knight Commander of the Order of the Bath; Military Cross; Mentioned in Despatches; Queen’s Commendation for Valuable Service; Legion of Merit (United States)

Lieutenant General Sir John Panton Kiszely, KCB, MC, DL (born 2 April 1948) is a retired senior British Army officer who was director general of the Defence Academy of the United Kingdom from 2005 to 2008. He is a former national president of The Royal British Legion.

== Early life ==
The son of Hungarian Dr. János "John" Kiszely, who was a volunteer doctor with the International Brigades who fought against General Francisco Franco during the Spanish Civil War, and Mrs. Kiszely, Kiszely was educated at Marlborough College and the Royal Military Academy Sandhurst before being commissioned into the Scots Guards as a second lieutenant on 20 December 1968.

== Military career ==
Kiszely served with the regiment as a platoon commander, company commander and commanding officer in Great Britain, Northern Ireland, Germany, Cyprus and the Falkland Islands. Kiszely was awarded the Military Cross for an action during the Battle of Mount Tumbledown during the Falklands War, where he led an attack in close quarter battle against determined resistance through the Argentine position which drove them from the summit.

Kiszely became commanding officer of 1st Battalion the Scots Guards in 1986 and, following various other military appointments, took command of 7th Armoured Brigade in early 1993. In 1996 he was appointed General Officer Commanding 1st (UK) Armoured Division and served as commander of the Multi-National Division (South-West) in Bosnia.

In September 1998 Kiszely was appointed assistant chief of defence staff (resource and plans) at the Ministry of Defence. In 2002 he was appointed Commander of Regional Forces at Land Command and, in 2004, he was deployed as senior British military representative and deputy commanding general, Multinational Force, Iraq. In 2005 he took up his post as director general of the Defence Academy. He retired from this post on 30 May 2008.

== Later life ==
On 14 December 2009, Kiszely gave evidence to The Iraq Inquiry in which he said that American officials had refused to admit that they were dealing with an insurgency in Iraq.

In December 2008, Kiszely was appointed national president of The Royal British Legion. He took over the role from Air Marshal Ian Macfadyen, who recommended him for the post. In an October 2012 article, the Sunday Times alleged that Kiszely was among several retired military leaders who had offered to lobby and influence MPs and government defence ministers on behalf of arms firms. When the Royal British Legion announced it was setting up an inquiry into Kiszely's behaviour, he resigned, admitting that he had made "exaggerated and foolish claims" and therefore it would be "inappropriate" for him to keep his role at the legion. However, he claimed that he had not broken Whitehall rules. Defence secretary Philip Hammond said that the allegations against Kiszely and others are damaging and that he may restrict the access that former officers have to current staff. "If they're abusing that access for commercial purposes then we will have to tighten it up or maybe even shut it down," he said. However, he argued that former military officers did not have influence on how the Ministry of Defence spends taxpayers' money. The Ministry of Defence said it would investigate whether Kiszely and other former generals implicated by the investigation had broken any rules and if so, what punishment was appropriate.

In 2017, Kiszely wrote the book, Anatomy of a Campaign: The British fiasco in Norway, 1940. It was published by the Cambridge University Press and won the inaugural Duke of Wellington Medal for Military History.

Military offices
Preceded by Roddy Cordy-Simpson	General Officer Commanding 1st (UK) Armoured Division; 1996–1998	Succeeded by Redmond Watt
Preceded by Mike Jackson	Commander Multi-National Division (South-West), Bosnia; June–December 1996	Succeeded by Evelyn Webb-Carter
New title	Commander Regional Forces; 2002–2004	Succeeded by Sir John McColl
Preceded by John McColl	Senior British Military Representative and Deputy Commanding General, Multinational Force, Iraq; 2004–2005	Succeeded by Robin Brims
Preceded by Sir Roger Jackling	Director General of the Defence Academy; 2005–2008	Succeeded by Andrew Graham
Non-profit organization positions
Preceded by Ian Macfadyen	President of the Royal British Legion; 2009–2012	Succeeded by Peter Wilkinson
