= Andrew Pringle (British Army officer) =

Major General Andrew Pringle CB CBE
- Born: 1946 (age 79–80)
- Military career
- Allegiance: United Kingdom
- Branch: British Army
- Service years: 1966–2001
- Rank: Major General
- Commands: Multi-National Division (South-West); 20th Armoured Brigade; Royal Green Jackets
- Conflicts: Operation Banner; Bosnian War; Kosovo War
- Awards: Companion of the Order of the Bath; Commander of the Order of the British Empire; Queen's Commendation for Valuable Service (2)

Major General Andrew Robert Douglas Pringle, CB, CBE (born 1946) is a retired British Army officer who served as president of KBR's International Government and Defence business.

== Military career ==
Pringle attended the Royal Military Academy Sandhurst and was commissioned on 16 December 1966, as a second lieutenant in the Royal Green Jackets. He was promoted to lieutenant in July 1968, captain in December 1972, and major in February 1979. He undertook numerous tours in Northern Ireland, for which he was appointed a Member of the Order of the British Empire. Promoted to lieutenant colonel in June 1983, he was given command of his Regiment and promoted to full colonel in June 1988.

Pringle was advanced to Commander of the Order of the British Empire in 1991. Promoted to brigadier in July 1992, he was then given command of the 20th Armoured Brigade in 1994. In that role, he undertook a tour in Bosnia in 1995, for which he was awarded a Queen's Commendation for Valuable Service. In 1996 he became Director of Land Warfare at the Ministry of Defence.

Pringle was promoted to major general and appointed Commander of the Multi-National Division (South-West) of the Stabilization Force in Bosnia in November 1997; this earned him a further Queen's Commendation for Valuable Service. He then became Chief of Staff at the UK's Permanent Joint Headquarters in October 1998, in which role he was involved in the direction of British operations in Iraq, East Timor, Moxambique, Sierra Leone Kosovo and Macedonia during 1998 - 2001. He was appointed a Companion of the Order of the Bath in the 2000 New Year Honours.

Pringle retired in October 2001. In March 2004 he became a Non-Executive Director of Manpower Software and, in April 2008, he was appointed president of KBR's International Government, Defence & Support Services business.

Military offices
Preceded by Angus Ramsay	Commander Multi-National Division (South-West), Bosnia; 1997–1998	Succeeded by Cedric Delves
