= Timothy Granville-Chapman =

British Army general

General Sir Timothy Granville-Chapman GBE KCB
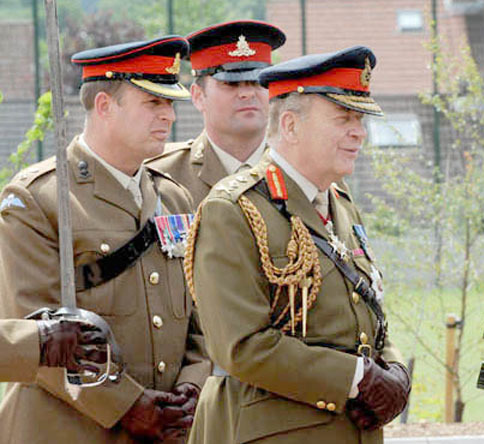
- General Granville-Chapman (right) in 2010
- Born: 5 January 1947 (age 79)
- Military career
- Allegiance: United Kingdom
- Branch: British Army
- Service years: 1968–2008
- Rank: General
- Commands: Vice-Chief of the Defence Staff; Commander-in-Chief, Land Forces; Adjutant-General to the Forces; Joint Services Command and Staff College; 1st Regiment Royal Horse Artillery
- Awards: Knight Grand Cross of the Order of the British Empire; Knight Commander of the Order of the Bath

Sir Timothy John Granville-Chapman (born 5 January 1947) is a former British Army officer, who served as Vice-Chief of the Defence Staff of the British Armed Forces (2005–2009).

== Early life ==
Granville-Chapman was born on 5 January 1947. He was educated at Charterhouse School, a public school in Godalming, Surrey. He studied law at Christ's College, Cambridge, and graduated from the University of Cambridge with a Bachelor of Arts (BA) in 1968; as per tradition, this was promoted to a Master of Arts (MA (Cantab)) degree.

== Military career ==
Granville-Chapman was commissioned into the Royal Artillery in 1968. He went on to be an instructor at the Royal Military Academy Sandhurst and then took a staff job in Military Operations in the Ministry of Defence. Later he became Military Assistant to the Commander 1 (BR) Corps before being appointed commanding officer of 1st Regiment Royal Horse Artillery (1RHA) in Hohne, Germany.

He was made the Chief of the General Staff's author for the first version of the British Military Doctrine and then went on to be assistant director in the Defence Policy Staff at the Ministry of Defence.

He was made commander of an armoured brigade in Germany and then Director of Army Staff Duties. He became Assistant Chief of the General Staff in 1994. He became the first Commandant of the Joint Service Command and Staff College when he was appointed to that post on 28 June 1996. He was made Adjutant General in 2000, Commander-in-Chief, Land Command in 2003 and Vice-Chief of the Defence Staff in 2005.

In July 2008 he was appointed as the Master Gunner, St James's Park. He held the position until 30 April 2017.

== Honours ==
Knight Grand Cross of the Order of the British Empire (GBE)	(2007)
Knight Commander of the Order of the Bath (KCB)	(2001)

Military offices
Preceded by Michael Walker	Assistant Chief of the General Staff; 1994–1996	Succeeded by Michael Willcocks
New title College established	Commandant of the Joint Services Command and Staff College; 1997–2000	Succeeded by Brian Burridge
Preceded by Sir Alexander Harley	Adjutant General; 2000–2003	Succeeded by Sir Alistair Irwin
Preceded by Sir Michael Jackson	Commander-in-Chief, Land Command; 2003–2005	Succeeded by Sir Richard Dannatt
Preceded by Sir Anthony Bagnall	Vice-Chief of the Defence Staff; 2005–2009	Succeeded by Sir Nick Houghton
Honorary titles
Preceded by Sir Alexander Harley	Master Gunner, St. James's Park; 2008–2017	Succeeded by Sir Andrew Gregory
Preceded by Sir Alexander Harley	Colonel Commandant and President, Honourable Artillery Company; 2003–2010	Succeeded by Sir Barney White-Spunner
