= Freddie Viggers =

British Army general, parliamentary official

Lieutenant General Sir Freddie Viggers KCB CMG MBE DL

Gentleman Usher of the Black Rod
- In office 30 April 2009 – 28 October 2010
- Monarch: Elizabeth II
- Preceded by: Sir Michael Willcocks
- Succeeded by: David Leakey

Personal details
- Born: 29 June 1951 (age 75)
- Education: Royal Military Academy Sandhurst
- Nickname: Freddie

Military service
- Allegiance: United Kingdom
- Branch/service: British Army
- Years of service: 1972–2008
- Rank: Lieutenant General
- Unit: Royal Artillery
- Commands: Adjutant-General to the Forces; Multi-National Division (South-West); Commander, Royal Artillery 3rd Division; 3rd Regiment Royal Horse Artillery
- Battles/wars: Bosnian War; Iraq War
- Awards: Knight Commander of the Order of the Bath; Companion of the Order of St Michael and St George; Member of the Order of the British Empire; Queen's Commendation for Valuable Service

Lieutenant General Sir Frederick Richard Viggers, KCB, CMG, MBE, DL (born 29 June 1951) is a former senior British Army officer who served as Adjutant-General to the Forces immediately prior to his retirement in 2008. He was Gentleman Usher of the Black Rod from 30 April 2009 to 28 October 2010. He also served in Bosnia in the aftermath of the breakup of Yugoslavia, and in the Iraq War.

== Early life ==
Viggers was born on 29 June 1951 and educated at Wellington School, Somerset.

== Military career ==
Having attended the Royal Military Academy Sandhurst, Viggers was commissioned into the Royal Regiment of Artillery as a second lieutenant on 14 April 1972. He was promoted lieutenant on 14 October 1973, and captain on 14 April 1978. In 1983 he attended the Staff College, Camberley, was promoted major on 30 September, and assumed command of a battery of 3rd Regiment Royal Horse Artillery (3RHA). In December 1985 he was appointed chief of staff to 1st Infantry Brigade, the brigade's main task was as NATO's "UK Mobile Force", which would have seen it reinforcing Denmark, or the Schleswig-Holstein area of Germany. As a result of his performance in this post, especially for his organisation of British participation in the NATO multi-national Operation Bold Guard, he was appointed a Member of the Order of the British Empire in the 1988 New Year Honours. The citation for this honour remarked: "1st Infantry Brigade is closer in size to a normal division[, its] strength rising to over 15,000 when formed into the United Kingdom Mobile Force (UKMF) ... Viggers enjoys a responsibility and workload far greater than that normally given to a Grade 2 officer ... [His contribution] has been quite outstanding, and far beyond the call of duty expected of an officer of his age and service." He was promoted lieutenant colonel on 30 June 1988, and was initially posted to the directing staff at Camberley before taking command of 3RHA in 1989. The regiment transferred from Germany to Colchester Garrison in early 1990, joining the 19th Infantry Brigade.

Viggers was promoted colonel on 30 June 1992, and served at the Ministry of Defence in the Central Staff Directorate of Defence Policy, transferring to the Defence Costs Study Secretariat in 1993. Promoted brigadier on 30 December 1994 (with seniority from 30 June), he became Commander, Royal Artillery in HQ 3rd Division in 1994 and attended the Higher Command and Staff Course before deploying to Bosnia with the division as part of the NATO Implementation Force (IFOR). He was then posted as Director of Manning (Army) in 1997, and was appointed Honorary Colonel of the 100th (Yeomanry) Regiment Royal Artillery (Volunteers) on 31 December 1997, holding that appointment until 17 February 2001.

On 24 March 1999, Viggers returned to Bosnia as Commander Multi-National Division (South-West) in SFOR and was granted acting promotion to major general, substantive promotion followed on 1 September 1999 (with seniority from the date of his acting rank). For his service there, he was awarded the Queen's Commendation for Valuable Service on 3 November 2000. On 9 February 2000 he became Chief of Staff at Land Command and remained there until May 2003. He received a further honorary appointment on 11 May 2000 when he became Deputy Colonel Commandant of the Adjutant General's Corps. In May 2003 he was appointed Senior British Military Representative and Deputy Commanding General, Multinational Force, Iraq, based in Baghdad following its occupation by US and British forces; for his service there he was appointed a Companion of the Order of St Michael and St George on 23 April 2004. His next post was as Military Secretary and Chief Executive Army Personnel Centre, which he took up on 20 October 2003.

=== Adjutant General ===
On 4 April 2005, Viggers became Adjutant General and was promoted lieutenant general. He became Colonel Commandant Royal Regiment of Artillery on 1 July 2005, and Colonel Commandant Adjutant General's Corps on 3 November 2003, holding that appointment until 28 July 2008. He was appointed a Knight Commander of the Order of the Bath in the 2007 New Year Honours, and made a Deputy Lieutenant of Hampshire in June 2008.

Viggers's period as Adjutant General coincided with heavy commitments for the British Army, which led to increased media discussion of the pay and conditions in the British Armed forces. He spoke out against the conditions in some barracks, and of the need for improved funding to bring accommodation stock up-to-date. On 7 May 2007, The Mail on Sunday published an article claiming that his house had been renovated at the taxpayers' expense, and he was also named in a 26 May article on the amount spent on accommodation and servants for high-ranking army officers. However, Viggers complained to the Press Complaints Commission and The Mail on Sunday subsequently printed an apology, accepting that the accommodation renovated was in fact an MOD property, and he had not been to blame for the state of military housing. He also issued an apology and authorised the payment of £3 million in compensation to the families of Baha Mousa and nine other Iraqis tortured by British troops.

Viggers retired on 29 October 2008, after 36 years of service in the British Army.

== Later life ==
In December 2008 it was announced that Viggers had been appointed to the House of Lords' position of Gentleman Usher of the Black Rod. He replaced Sir Michael Willcocks on 30 April 2009 when Willcocks retired. On 18 May 2010, he was due to take part in the ceremonial opening of Parliament following the 2010 general election, but he suffered a serious stroke and was unable to attend. His place was taken by his deputy, the Yeoman Usher, Ted Lloyd-Jukes. He resigned as Black Rod because of ill health on 28 October 2010.

Viggers is married with two children, and has a keen interest in sport. He is a trustee of the Army Museums Ogilby Trust, which assists British Army regimental and corps museums; he is also an Honorary Fellow, and member of the advisory group, of the Institute of Continuing Professional Development; and has assisted in running events for the Army Benevolent Fund. On 9 December 2009, Viggers gave evidence to The Iraq Inquiry, in which he was highly critical of the administration of post-war Iraq.

Military offices
Preceded by Redmond Watt	Commander Multi-National Division (South-West), Bosnia; 1999–2000	Succeeded by Robin Brims
New title	Senior British Military Representative and Deputy Commanding General, Multinational Force, Iraq; May–September 2003	Succeeded by Andrew Figgures
Preceded by Peter Grant Peterkin	Military Secretary; 2003–2005	Succeeded by Nicholas Cottam
Preceded by Sir Alistair Irwin	Adjutant General; 2005–2008	Succeeded by Bill Rollo
Government offices
Preceded by Sir Michael Willcocks	Black Rod; 2008–2010	Succeeded by David Leakey
