= 20th Armoured Brigade (United Kingdom) =

20th Armoured Brigade 20th Armoured Infantry Brigade 20th Armoured Brigade
- 20th Armoured Infantry Brigade Formation Sign.
- Active: 15 September 1950–30 November 1977; 1 January 1980–present
- Country: United Kingdom
- Branch: British Army
- Role: Armoured warfare
- Size: Brigade
- Part of: 3rd (United Kingdom) Division
- Garrison/HQ: Wing Barracks, Bulford Camp
- Nickname: "The Iron Fist"
- Mottos: Fide, sed cui vide

Commanders
- Current commander: Brigadier Carl Boswell
- Notable commanders: 1985-87 Michael Regan

Insignia
- Identification symbol: "The Iron Fist" - A white mailed fist on a blue background

The 20th Armoured Brigade, previously the 20th Armoured Infantry Brigade, is an armoured infantry brigade formation of the British Army, currently headquartered at Wing Barracks, Bulford, Wiltshire, as part of the 3rd (United Kingdom) Division.

== History ==
=== Cold War ===
On 15 September 1950, the 20th Armoured Brigade was reformed in the UK for a strategic reserve role. However, the brigade was moved to Münster, Germany in December 1951 to supplement the British contribution to NATO forces in Europe, where it again came under the command of 6th Armoured Division, this time as part of the British Army of the Rhine (BAOR).

The 1957 Defence White Paper announced the end of National Service, resulting in a number of reductions and changes across the armed forces. Part of this restructuring saw the disbandment of the 6th Armoured Division in April 1958. The Brigade survived as the new 20th Armoured Brigade Group, initially under the command of the 4th Infantry Division, and moved to Hobart Barracks, Detmold. It assumed the insignia of the old Division – the "Iron Fist" symbol that it wears to this day.

The pattern of life was determined by the BAOR training cycle and the demands of higher formation exercises as politicians and military commanders considered how best to face the threat of a Soviet invasion. Brigade exercises were frequently part of larger NATO exercises, often alongside the fledgling Bundeswehr (German Army). In October 1961, the Brigade participated in Exercise Spearpoint which was designed to demonstrate that the BAOR was able to conduct large-scale intensive operations under both conventional and nuclear conditions.

In September 1959, The Royal Corps of Signals reorganised all of their independent squadrons into a single numbering system from 200 upwards. This meant that when the Brigade's Signal Squadron adopted the title "200" in 1962 it automatically became the 'Senior Signal Squadron' in the British Army by precedence. Two years later it amalgamated with the brigade's Headquarters Squadron and took over responsibility for the administration and defence of the HQ and together the two separate units are designated as "20th Armoured Brigade Headquarters and Signal Squadron (200)".

On 22 June 1974, 20th Armoured Brigade and the German 21st Panzer Brigade, based in Augustdorf, held a partnership parade to emphasise the confidence and understanding that exists between the allied forces of the NATO countries.

BAOR experimented with a major restructuring towards the end of the 1970s as it reorganised into four divisions, each with two task force headquarters. These task forces could command any grouping of units from within their division and were designated sequentially Alpha through Hotel. As a result, on 1 December 1977, 20th Armoured Brigade was temporarily renamed "Task Force Hotel" under the command of the 4th Armoured Division. However, Task Force Hotel reverted to its brigade designation on 1 January 1980 and its units came under the Brigade Headquarters once again.

Unit rotations continued throughout this period, as part of the continual Arms Plot. Many famous regiments and battalions of the British Army converted to the armoured role to serve within the brigade. Typical were the Life Guards and the Blues and Royals, who served on a four-year rotational plan. As the Life Guards moved to BAOR, it became a Tank Regiment for the first time in its history, only to re-role as an infantry battalion in order to deploy on three separate operational tours of Northern Ireland.

=== Post-Cold War ===
Following the fall of the Berlin Wall in November 1989 and the end of the Cold War, the British government announced a series of defence spending cuts under the 1990 "Options for Change" programme. As a result, in December 1992, the Brigade merged with the 33rd Armoured Brigade and moved its headquarters to Barker Barracks, Paderborn, where it came under the command of the 1st Armoured Division. By 1994, the overall troop strength in Germany was halved.

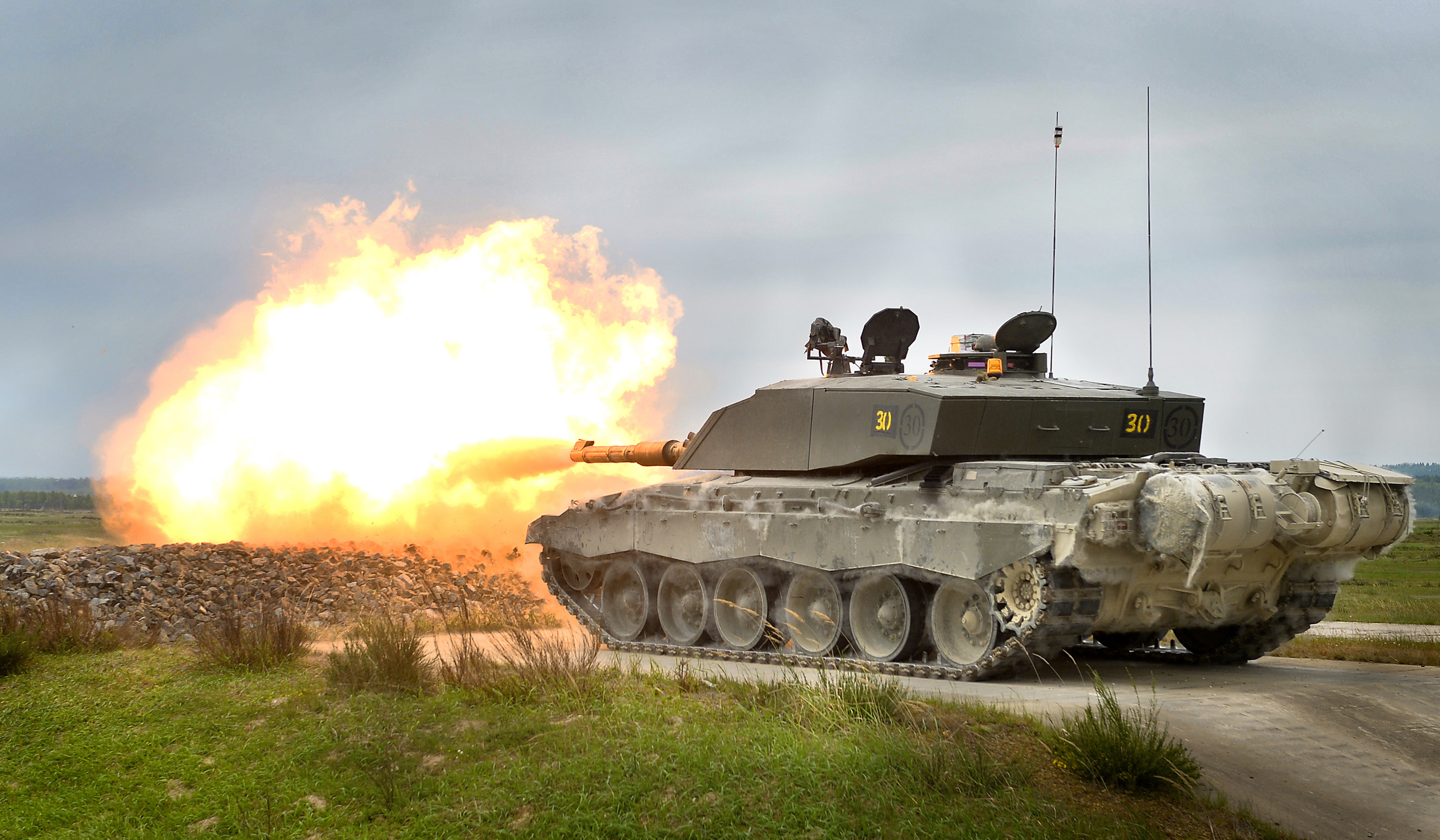
A 20th Armoured Brigade Challenger 2 main battle tank during an exercise in 2013

Headquarters 20th Armoured Brigade, with some elements of the Brigade deployed to the former SFR Yugoslavia (FRY) in April 1995 to take command of Sector South West of the United Nations Protection Force. Based at Gornji Vakuf in central Bosnia and Herzegovina, the commander was responsible for a large multi-national UN force as well as having responsibility for all forces in FRY. The end of the tour coincided with a declaration of peace and a shift in command, under the larger IFOR force, under NATO auspices.

In October 1996, the Brigade returned to Yugoslavia as part of Multi-National Division (South-West). It was initially based at Šipovo, moving to Banja Luka in December 1996, whilst overseeing the transition from IFOR to SFOR and Operation RESOLUTE to Operation LODESTAR. The Brigade returned to Paderborn in April 1997.

In August 1999, the Brigade again deployed to Banja Luka on Operation PALATINE. It returned to Paderborn in December 1999, and moved to Antwerp Barracks, Sennelager on 20 August 2001.

==== Operation Telic (Iraq) ====
In October 2003, the Brigade first deployed to southern Iraq on Operation Telic 3, where it was based at Basra Palace. The Brigade's first two-months of the deployment was dominated by low-level battles against fanatical Fedayeen and foreign fighters infiltrating across the border with Iran who were actively supported by Iranian Al Quds forces, post-operational reports also mention former Ba'athist regime loyalists. Before their deployment, United Nations Security Council Resolution 1511 was passed, which set the basis for rebuilding Iraq and establishing security. The aim was to eventually transfer authority from the Coalition Provisional Authority to an Iraqi Transitional National Assembly. The middle two months of the Brigade's tour was dominated by security sector reform, to achieve this aim meant the building of capacity in the Iraqi Security Forces (especially the paramilitary Iraqi Civil Defence Corps and police) and civilian Iraqi institutions. Security sector reform would remain an objective for the rest of the tour. The final two months of Operation Telic 3 were dominated by high-intensity operations against resurgent Shia militias (notably the Jaish al Mahdi (JAM).

20th Armoured Brigade was awarded the Freedom of the City of Paderborn by the town council on 28 May 2005. The right to exercise the freedom was presented "as a contribution for consolidation of the Anglo-German friendship, the joint solidarity in NATO and a further element for the building of the joint house Europe".

The Brigade returned to southern Iraq again in April 2006 during Operation TELIC 8, and was situated in Basra, Al Amarah and Al Muthanna Provinces. During the seven month summer tour, the troops contributed to the successful handover of security in two of the four Iraqi Provinces within the Multinational Division (South East) [MND(SE)].

The Iron Fist returned to Basra for a third time in 2008 for Operation TELIC 13. It became the last British brigade to serve in Iraq at the end of the UK's six-year combat mission in the country on 30 April 2009.

==== Operation Herrick (Afghanistan) ====
20th Armoured Brigade took over command of Task Force Helmand in Afghanistan from 3 Commando Brigade Royal Marines on 9 October 2011, officially marking the start of Operation Herrick 15.

== Future ==
Under the Army's new 2020 structure, in January 2015 the Brigade was retitled to 20th Armoured Infantry Brigade incorporating three armoured infantry battle groups. In 2016 the Brigade began its high readiness training in preparation for becoming NATO's lead for the Very High Readiness Joint Task Force Land [VJTF(L)] in 2017.

The Brigade Headquarters moved to Wing Barracks, Bulford, in 2019.

Under the 2021 Future Soldier plans, the brigade has been redesignated as the 20th Armoured Brigade, and is planned to include a reconnaissance regiment equipped with the General Dynamics Ajax. The current armoured regiment (QRH) will be re-equipped with the Challenger 3 tank and the armoured infantry battalions with the Warrior IFV re-equipped with the Boxer AFV.

== Structure ==
The brigade is based at Bulford Camp. It will form as part of the Reaction Force.

The current organisation of the brigade under the Defence in a Competitive Age is:

- 20th Armoured Infantry Brigade Headquarters, at Wing Barracks, Bulford Camp
  - Royal Dragoon Guards, in Warminster (Armoured Cavalry)
  - Queen's Royal Hussars, at Assaye Barracks, Tidworth Camp (Armoured)
  - 1st Battalion, Royal Regiment of Fusiliers, at Mooltan Barrack, Tidworth Camp (Armoured Infantry)
  - 3rd Battalion, The Princess of Wales' s Royal Regiment at Leros Barracks, Canterbury (Army Reserve – Light Role Infantry)
  - 5th Battalion, Royal Regiment of Fusiliers, in Newcastle upon Tyne (Army Reserve – Armoured Infantry, paired with 1 R Fusiliers)
  - 5th Battalion, The Rifles, at Ward Barracks, Bulford Garrison (Armoured Infantry)
  - 7th Battalion, The Rifles, in Reading (Army Reserve – Armoured Infantry, paired with 5 Rifles)
  - 3 Armoured Close Support Battalion, Royal Electrical and Mechanical Engineers, in Tidworth (Armoured Close Support)

=== Alliances ===
- Germany - Panzerbrigade 21 (21st Panzer Brigade)

== Brigade commanders ==
Recent commanders have included:

- 1954–1956 Brigadier John Hackett
- 1958–1961 Brigadier James d'Avigdor-Goldsmid
- 1963–1965 Brigadier Richard Ward
- 1965–1968 Brigadier Patrick Howard-Dobson
- 1969–1970 Brigadier John Stanier
- 1972–1973 Brigadier Richard Lawson
- 1973–1975 Brigadier Maurice Johnston
- 1978–1979 Brigadier Bernard Gordon Lennox
- 1979–1981 Brigadier John Stibbon
- 1985-1987 Brigadier Michael Regan
- 1987–1989 Brigadier Michael Walker
- 1992–1994 Brigadier Arthur Denaro
- 1994–1996 Brigadier Andrew Pringle
- 1996–1997 Brigadier David Leakey
- 1997–1999 Brigadier Nick Parker
- 1999–2001 Brigadier Jeffrey Cook
- 2001–2004 Brigadier David Rutherford-Jones
- 2004–2005 Brigadier Nick Carter
- 2005–2007 Brigadier James Everard
- 2007–2009 Brigadier Tom Beckett
- 2009–2012 Brigadier Patrick Sanders
- 2012–2014 Brigadier James Swift
- 2014–2016 Brigadier Ian Mortimer
- 2016–2018 Brigadier Michael Elviss
- 2018–2020 Brigadier Dominic Biddick
- 2020–2021 Brigadier Patrick Ginn
- 2021–Present Brigadier Carl Boswell

== See also ==
- Formation reconnaissance regiment
- Very High Readiness Joint Task Force Land
- 3rd (UK) Division
- British Forces Germany
