= Higher Command and Staff Course =

The Higher Command and Staff Course is a staff course for senior military officers of the United Kingdom armed forces and allies. It is taught at the Defence Academy of the United Kingdom in Shrivenham, Oxfordshire, United Kingdom.

The course is provided by the Joint Services Command and Staff College of the British Armed Forces initially for 24 colonels or equivalent aged 41 to 44 years (and a few lieutenant-colonels and brigadiers): 15 from the army, 1 or 2 from the Royal Navy, 1 or 2 from the Royal Air Force, and 4 from overseas (such as the United States of America, Germany, Netherlands, and Australia), and some civilians (from the Ministry of Defence). In 1994 it was increased to 30 officers, and was part of the new Joint Service Command and Staff College, having originally been at the Staff College, Camberley.

The course lasts 17 weeks and concentrates on joint operations.

== History ==
Led by the Colonel Higher Command and Staff Course, from 1988, there are 9 phases including out of area and future battlefield. The course culminates in an army-group level ADP backed wargaming exercise.

Those attending the annual course, and those on the Directing Staff receive the letters "HCSC" in the service List. The course is designed to prepare selected officers for higher command of field formations and for senior operational staff appointments in national and international HQs. There is an average of 240 pages of background reading per day.

The Higher Command and Staff Course resembles the 1938 Higher Command Course, Aldershot, which was for lieutenant-colonels and above.

== Goals ==
The HCSC is intended:

- to provide a sound theoretical grounding in the principles of the conduct of war at the operational level (i.e. corps, army);
- to indicate the factors which have moulded national armies and are now shaping modern concepts of warfare;
- to provide the strategic and political framework within which operations, in co-operation with allied formations, may be conducted;
- by an analysis of historical examples and exercises, to provide an insight into the key factors which require continuous assessment during the conduct of operations;
- to provide an understanding of how to plan and shape the battlefield at the operational level in order to meet the strategic aim;
- to provide an insight into the role of technology in the shaping of modern armies, with a proper regard for the financial implications, with an update on present and projected weapon and equipment capabilities;
- to provide an understanding of the principles of leadership and command appropriate to the operational level of command and senior staff appointments in peace and war.

== See also ==
- Joint Services Command and Staff College
