= Assistant Chief of the Defence Staff =

Senior appointment in the British armed forces

The Assistant Chief of the Defence Staff (ACDS) is a senior British military officer. There are a number of ACDS appointments and they are held by officers of two-star rank (rear admiral, air vice-marshal, or major general). They work in the Ministry of Defence.

== Assistant Chief of the Defence Staff (Health) ==
The ACDS(H) reports to the Surgeon General.

- Surgeon Rear Admiral Lionel Jarvis (2008–2011)
- Major General Jeremy Rowan (2011–2014)
- Surgeon Rear Admiral Alasdair Walker (2014–2015)
- Major General Martin Bricknell (2015–2018)

== Assistant Chief of the Defence Staff (Capability & Force Design) ==
- Air Vice-Marshal Graeme A. Robertson (1994–1996)
- Rear-Admiral Nigel R. Essenhigh (1996–1998)
- Major-General John P. Kiszely (1998–2001)
- Rear-Admiral Rory A.I. McLean (2001–2004)
- Rear-Admiral Timothy J.H. Laurence (2004–2007)
- Air Vice-Marshal Kevin J. Leeson (2007–2009)
- Rear-Admiral Alan D. Richards (2009–2011)
- Major-General Mark Poffley (2011–2014)
- Rear Admiral Tim Fraser (2014–2017)
- Air Vice-Marshal Rich Knighton (2017–2018)
- Major-General Robert Magowan (2018–2020)
- Rear Admiral Hugh Beard (2020–2022)
- Major-General David Eastman (2022–2024)
- Air Vice-Marshal Tim Jones (2024–2025)
- Major-General Alex Turner (2025–present)

== Assistant Chief of the Defence Staff (Military Strategy) later, Defence Engagement ==
- Major-General Alexander J.S. Storrie (2011–2013)
- Rear-Admiral Simon J. Ancona (2013–2017)
- Major-General Giles P. Hill (2017–2019)
- Major-General Stephen McMahon (2019–2020)
- Air Vice-Marshal Alastair P.T. Smith (2020–2022)
- Major General Julian Buczacki (2022–2025)
- Air Vice-Marshal Mark Flewin (2025–2026)
- Air Vice-Marshal Mark Jackson (2026–present)

== Assistant Chief of the Defence Staff (Intelligence Capability) ==
The ACDS(IC) reports to the Chief of Defence Intelligence.

- Major General Jerry Thomas (2009–2012)

== Assistant Chief of the Defence Staff (Intelligence Collection) ==
- Major General Michael Laurie CBE (2002-2003)

== Assistant Chief of the Defence Staff (Commitments)/(Operations, now Operations & Commitments) ==
- Rear Admiral David Brown (1980–1982)
- Air Vice-Marshal Clive Loader (2002–2004)
- Major General Nick Houghton (2004–2005)
- Major General Chris Nickols (2005–2008)
- Air Vice-Marshal Andrew Pulford (2008–2010)
- Major General David Capewell (2010–2011)
- Air Vice-Marshal Bob Judson (2011–2013)
- Major General Patrick Sanders (2013–2015)
- Air Vice-Marshal Edward Stringer (2015–2017)
- Air Vice-Marshal Andrew Turner (2017–2019)
- Major General Charles Stickland (2019–2021)
- Air Vice-Marshal Allan Marshall (2021–2024)
- Rear Admiral Steve Moorhouse (2024–2025)
- Major General Daniel Reeve (2025–present)

== Assistant Chief of the Defence Staff (Personnel Capability) ==
Since 1992, the Defence Services Secretary has usually holds the appointment of ACDS(P) as a secondary role.

- Major General Brian Pennicott (1992–1994)
- Air Vice-Marshal Peter John Harding (1994–1998)
- Rear Admiral Rodney Lees (1998–2001)
- Major General Christopher Elliot (2001–2004)
- Air Vice-Marshal David Pocock (2004–2005)
- Rear Admiral Peter Wilkinson (2005–2007)
- Major General Matthew Sykes (2009–2010)
- Air Vice-Marshal David Murray (2010–2012)
- Rear Admiral Simon Williams (2012–2015)
- Major General Richard Nugee (2015–2016)
- Air Vice-Marshal Garry Tunnicliffe (2016–2019)
- Rear-Admiral James Macleod (2019–2022)
- Rear-Admiral Philip Hally (2022–2023)
- Major General Eldon Millar (2023–2024)
- Major General Lisa Keetley (2024–present)

== Assistant Chief of the Defence Staff (Policy) ==
- Air Vice-Marshal John Gingell (1975–1978)
- Rear Admiral Jock Slater (1985–1987)
- Air Vice-Marshal Eric Macey (1987–1989)
- Air Vice-Marshal John Willis (1989–1990)
- Rear Admiral Jonathan Tod (1990–1994)
- Air Vice-Marshal David Henderson (1994–1995)
- Air Vice-Marshal Joe French (1995–1997)
- Major General Christopher Drewry (1997–2000)
- Major General John Reith (2000–2001)
- Air Vice-Marshal David Hobart (2001–2004)
- Major General Andrew Stewart (2004–2006)
- Rear Admiral Alan Richards (2006–2009)
- Major General Jonathan Shaw (2009–2012)

== Assistant Chief of the Defence Staff (Reserves and Cadets) ==
The ACDS(R&C) is the senior reservist of the British Armed Forces. They are responsible for tri-service policy relating to the reserves and cadet forces. The appointment was created in 2004.

- Major General Gerald Grosvenor, 6th Duke of Westminster (2004–2007)
- Major General Simon Lalor (2007–2010)
- Major General Greg Smith (2010–2013)
- Major General John Crackett (2013–2016)
- Major General Ranald Munro (2016–2019)
- Major General Simon Brooks-Ward (2019–2022)
- Major General Marc Overton (2022–2026)
- Major General Mark Lancaster, Baron Lancaster of Kimbolton (2026–present)

== Assistant Chief of the Defence Staff (Nuclear, Chemical, Biological) ==
- Rear Admiral John Gower (2011-2014)
