= William O'Leary (British Army officer) =

British Army officer

Major General William O'Leary QVRM TD VR DL
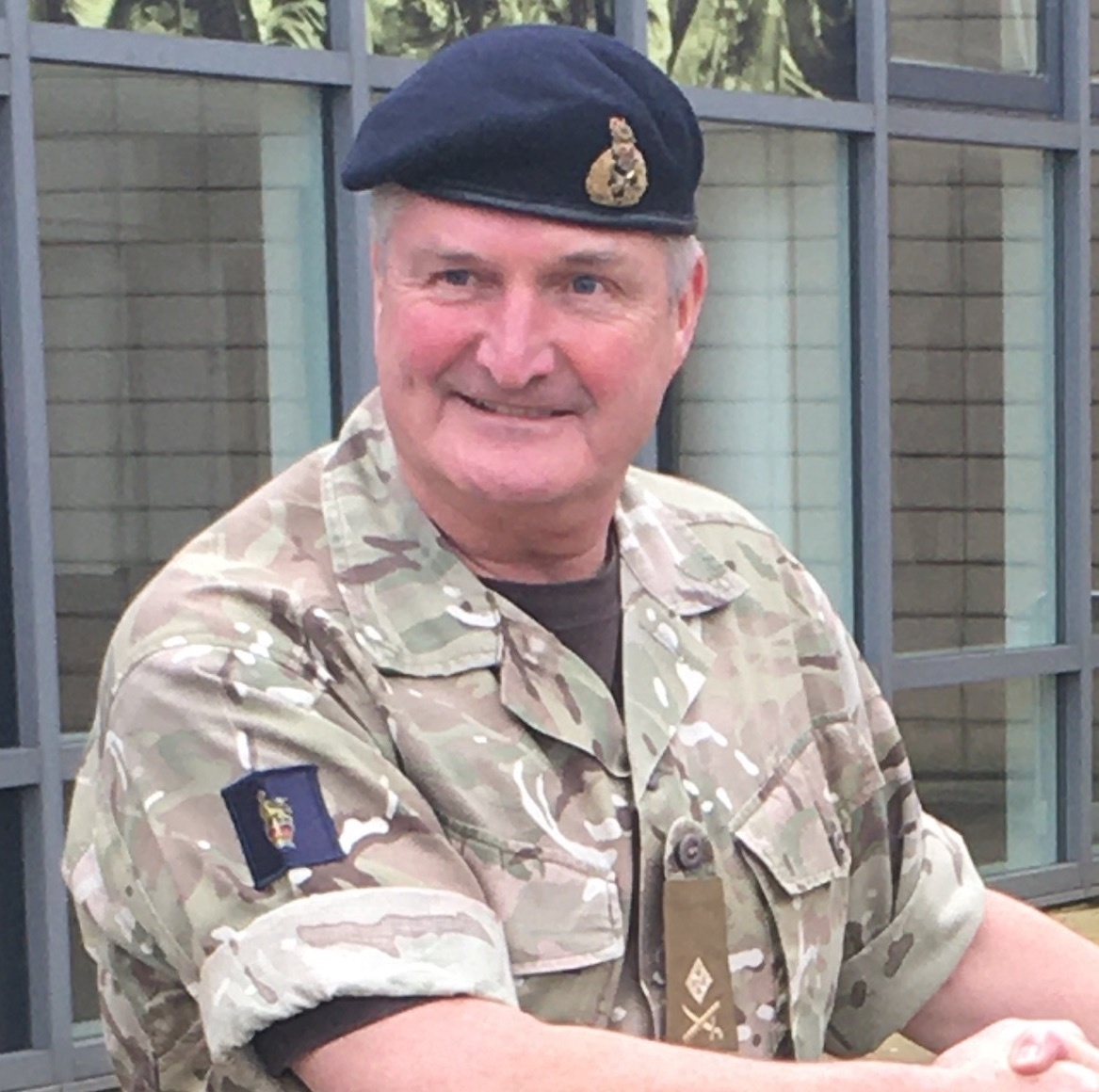
- Major General O'Leary in 2020
- Military career
- Allegiance: United Kingdom
- Branch: British Army
- Service years: 1981–2020
- Rank: Major General
- Unit: Royal Electrical and Mechanical Engineers
- Commands: 103 Battalion REME
- Awards: Queen's Volunteer Reserves Medal; Territorial Decoration

Major General William O'Leary QVRM TD VR DL is a retired senior British Army Reserve officer who served as Deputy Commander Field Army.

== Military career ==
After serving for seven years as a soldier, O'Leary was commissioned as a reserve officer in the Royal Electrical and Mechanical Engineers ('REME') in 1988. He became commanding officer of 103 Battalion REME in 1999, Colonel Regional Forces in 2002 and Colonel Territorial Army Recruiting in 2005. He went on to be Deputy Brigade Commander of 145 (South) Brigade in 2008, Assistant Commander Theatre Troops in 2011 and Assistant Deputy Military Secretary in 2015. After that he became Deputy Commander Field Army in 2018. O'Leary retired from the British Army on 12 March 2020.

He was a Colonel Commandant of the Corps of Royal Electrical and Mechanical Engineers until May 2024, and Honorary Colonel of the 103 Battalion REME Army Reserve until June 2024.

== Business career ==
After training as an engineering and sales specialist, O'Leary has worked in international business development with MGI Coutier, an automotive systems manufacturer, since the late 1990s.

Military offices
Preceded by Simon Brooks-Ward	Deputy Commander Field Army (Reserves); 2018–2020	Succeeded by Celia Harvey
