= Greg Smith (British Army officer) =

British businessman and British Army officer

Major General Greg Smith CB QVRM TD VR DL
- Born: Gregory Stephen Smith; 18 May 1956 (age 70); Norwich, Norfolk, England
- Military career
- Allegiance: United Kingdom
- Branch: British Army
- Service years: 1980 to 2013
- Rank: Major General
- Service number: 517219
- Units: The Light Infantry; Royal Green Jackets
- Commands: Assistant Chief of the Defence Staff
- Other work: Businessman

Major General Gregory Stephen Smith, CB, QVRM, TD, VR, DL (born 18 May 1956) is a British businessman and retired British Army officer. He served as an officer of the Territorial Army from 1980 to 2013 and became the most senior reservist of the British Armed Forces. He served as Assistant Chief of the Defence Staff (Reserves and Cadets) from 2010 to 2013.

== Early life ==
Smith was born on 18 May 1956 in Norwich, Norfolk, England. He is the son of James Lee Smith and his wife Geraldine Mary Smith. He was educated at the private Norwich School. He went on to study agricultural and food marketing at Newcastle University. He graduated with a Bachelor of Science (BSc Hons) in 1979.

== Career ==
Smith was Director of Taylor Nelson Sofres from 1992 to 2000 and Ipsos MORI from 2001 to 2009. He founded Read Smith Consulting in 2010. He was a Partner of Knighton White, a philanthropic and social responsibility advisory and management service. He was Chairman of Newcastle University Business School Advisory Board from 2009 to 2014. Since 2011, he has been a member of the university's Court. He became Chief Executive of the Royal Norfolk Agricultural Association in 2012.

=== Military service ===
Smith was commissioned into the Territorial unit of The Light Infantry, the 5th Battalion, on 31 July 1983 as a second lieutenant (on probation). He was given the service number 517219. His commission and rank were confirmed on 4 September 1984. He was promoted to lieutenant on 31 July 1985, and to captain on 1 May 1987.

He transferred from the Light Infantry to the Royal Green Jackets as a captain on 15 April 1989 with seniority in that rank from 1 May 1987. Already an acting major, he was promoted to major on 1 March 1991, with seniority from 16 October 1990. He was promoted to lieutenant colonel on 11 October 1996. He was commanding officer of the 5th (Volunteer) Battalion, Royal Green Jackets.

He was promoted to colonel on 1 September 1999. He was promoted to brigadier, equivalent to a one-star general, on 30 March 2006. He was then appointed Director of Army Reserves. On 29 March 2010, he was promoted to major general (2-star general officer) with seniority from that date and was appointed Assistant Chief of the Defence Staff (Reserves and Cadets). He left the appointment in March 2013 and was succeeded by John Crackett.

Though retired from the military, he holds a number of honorary positions. In 2014, he became honorary colonel of Northumbrian Universities Officer Training Corps and chairman of East Anglia Reserve Forces' and Cadets' Association (until 2018). He became chairman of the board of the Council of Reserve Forces' and Cadets' Associations in December 2018.

He was made a Doctor of Civil Law honoris causa by the University of East Anglia in October 2019.

== Personal life ==
Smith married Rebecca Elizabeth Read in 1982. Together they have two sons and one daughter. He is a member of the Army and Navy Club and the Norfolk Club.

== Honours and decorations ==

Smith was awarded the Efficiency Decoration (TD) on 22 November 1994 in recognition of twelve years service as a Territorial Army officer. He was awarded a clasp to his Efficiency Decoration on 4 December 2001 in recognition of a further six years service. On 28 April 2009, he was awarded the Volunteer Reserve Service Medal, having served for ten years in the reserves following the establishment of the award in April 1999. He was awarded the Queen's Volunteer Reserves Medal (QVRM) in the 2009 Queen's Birthday Honours. On 11 August 2009, he was awarded a clasp to his Volunteer Reserve Service Medal. In the 2013 New Year Honours, he was appointed Companion of the Order of the Bath (CB).

On 5 June 1998, he was commissioned as a Deputy Lieutenant (DL) by the Lord Lieutenant of Buckinghamshire. He was appointed aide de camp (Territorial Army) to The Queen on 22 February 2002. His tenure expired on 1 April 2004. On 15 May 2009, he was appointed to the honorary position of Deputy Colonel of The Rifles.

Military offices
| Preceded by Simon Lalor | Assistant Chief of the Defence Staff; 2010–2013 | Succeeded by John Crackett |
