= Aidan Smyth =

British businessman (1966-2025)

Major General Aidan Smyth QVRM TD VR DL
- Born: 26 September 1966
- Died: 3 January 2025 (age 58)
- Military career
- Allegiance: United Kingdom
- Branch: British Army
- Service years: 1989–Present
- Rank: Major General
- Commands: 101 (City of London) Engineer Regiment
- Conflicts: Iraq War
- Awards: Queen's Volunteer Reserves Medal; Territorial Decoration; Volunteer Reserves Service Medal

Major General Aidan Michael Gerard Smyth, QVRM, TD, VR, DL (26 September 1966 – 3 January 2025) was a British businessman and senior Army Reserve officer.

== Military career ==
Smyth was born in 1966, the son of Gerard Vincent Smyth. He was commissioned into the Royal Engineers on 26 November 1989. After serving in Iraq in 2003, he became commanding officer of 101 (City of London) Engineer Regiment in 2008. He went on to serve as Deputy Commander of the Army Recruiting and Training Division, Deputy Director Land Warfare and Deputy Military Secretary (Reserves). His final appointment was as Deputy Commander Field Army (Reserves) in April 2022.

Smyth was awarded the Queen's Volunteer Reserves Medal in the 2011 Birthday Honours.

== Civilian career ==
Smyth worked as European Head of Financial Services at an Australian company before establishing his own search and selection consultancy in 2010. He was appointed Clerk to the Worshipful Company of Feltmakers in 2021, and became a Deputy Lieutenant of Surrey in February 2023.

Major General Smyth died on 3 January 2025, aged 58, at Farnham, Surrey.

Military offices
Preceded by Celia Harvey	Deputy Commander Field Army (Reserves); 2022–2024	Succeeded by John Kendall
