= Celia Harvey =

British Army Major General and academic (born 1962)

Major General Celia Harvey OBE QVRM TD VR
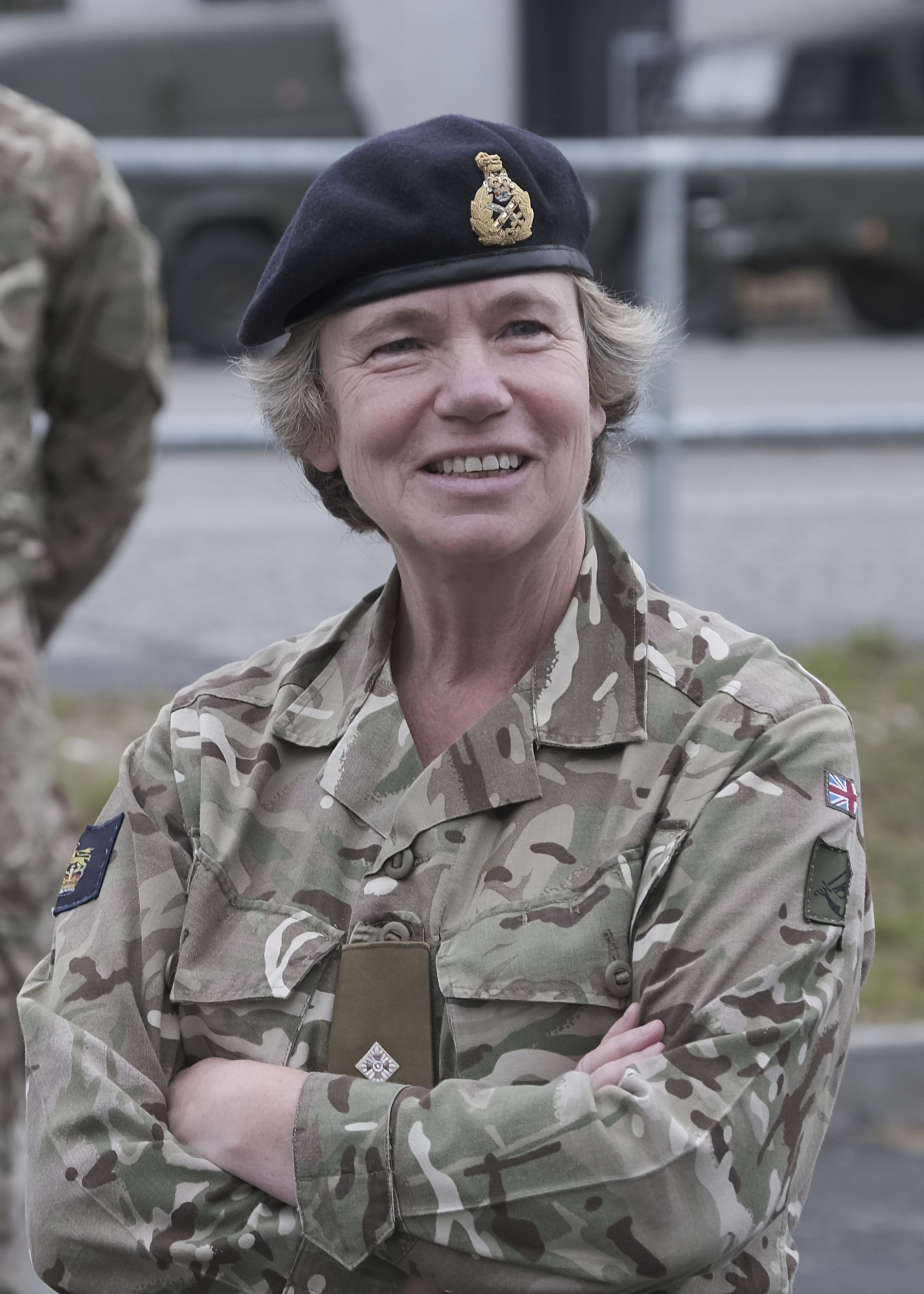
- Major General Harvey in 2020
- Born: 4 December 1962 (age 63); Leicester, England
- Military career
- Allegiance: British Army
- Branch: Women's Royal Army Corps & Royal Electrical and Mechanical Engineers
- Service years: 1987–2022
- Rank: Major General
- Awards: Officer of the Order of the British Empire; Queen's Volunteer Reserves Medal; Efficiency Decoration; Volunteer Reserve Service Medal

Celia Jane Harvey OBE QVRM TD VR (née Plummer; born 4 December 1962) is a British soldier and academic. She has served in the Territorial Army since joining the Women's Royal Army Corps in 1987. Harvey transferred to the Royal Electrical and Mechanical Engineers in 1991. She was promoted to major general in March 2020 and became deputy commander Field Army. Harvey stood for election to parliament as a Conservative Party candidate in 2010 in the Leicester West seat and came second to Liz Kendall. She was a lecturer in business studies and has published several academic papers.

== Early life and career ==
Celia Plummer was born on 4 December 1962 in Leicester, England. She joined the Territorial Army (TA) section of the Women's Royal Army Corps (WRAC) as an officer cadet and was commissioned as a probationary second lieutenant on 5 July 1987; her full commission was confirmed the following year. Plummer was promoted to the rank of lieutenant on 5 July 1989. With the disbandment of WRAC and integration of women into the main army, Plummer transferred to the Royal Electrical and Mechanical Engineers on 1 April 1991, by which time she held the acting rank of captain. On 11 November 1991, she received promotion to the substantive rank of captain with her seniority backdated to 1 January 1991. On 31 July 1993 she married John Attlee, 3rd Earl Attlee, and was afterwards styled Countess Attlee.

== Field officer and later career ==
Countess Attlee was promoted to the rank of major on 20 January 1997 with seniority backdated to 10 January 1994. She was awarded the Efficiency Decoration for twelve years' service in the TA on 24 August 1999 and promoted to lieutenant colonel on 1 January 2001. From February 2001 to May 2003 she commanded the East Midlands University Officer Training Corps. She was nominated for appointment as an Officer of the Order of the British Empire, which was approved and granted in the 2003 Birthday Honours. By this time Countess Attlee had divorced Earl Attlee and remarried to John Harvey, a TA colonel 13 years her senior. The couple had their first child in November 2001.

Harvey then worked as an instructor at the Joint Services Command and Staff College and was promoted to colonel on 1 March 2005. She was awarded the Queen's Volunteer Reserves Medal in the 2009 New Year Honours and the Volunteer Reserve Service Medal on 23 June 2009. Harvey's husband became a district councillor and in July 2009 Celia Harvey was selected as the Conservative Party's parliamentary candidate for the Leicester West constituency. In the 2010 United Kingdom general election Harvey came second to Labour's Liz Kendall having increased the Conservative vote by 2.8% and reduced Labour's majority to 4,017 (from 9,070).

Harvey's career outside the army was in academia, particularly in business studies. She has worked as a lecturer and published several papers on innovation and entrepreneurship including Entrepreneurship and Marketing: Issues for Independent Inventors in 2014. Harvey was working as a consultant for Marketwise in 2004. Harvey assists her local branch of the Royal British Legion.

== General officer career ==
Harvey was promoted to brigadier by 2017, at which time she was serving as assistant commander of Force Troops Command. On 4 June 2019 the then Defence Secretary Penny Mordaunt announced that Harvey would be promoted to the rank of major general and appointed deputy commander Field Army in March 2020. Harvey would become the first female major general in the Field Army, the third female major general in the British Army and the first from the reserve forces. Harvey assumed the appointment on 11 March 2020, and was promoted to major-general at the same time. She retired from the Army on 4 December 2022.

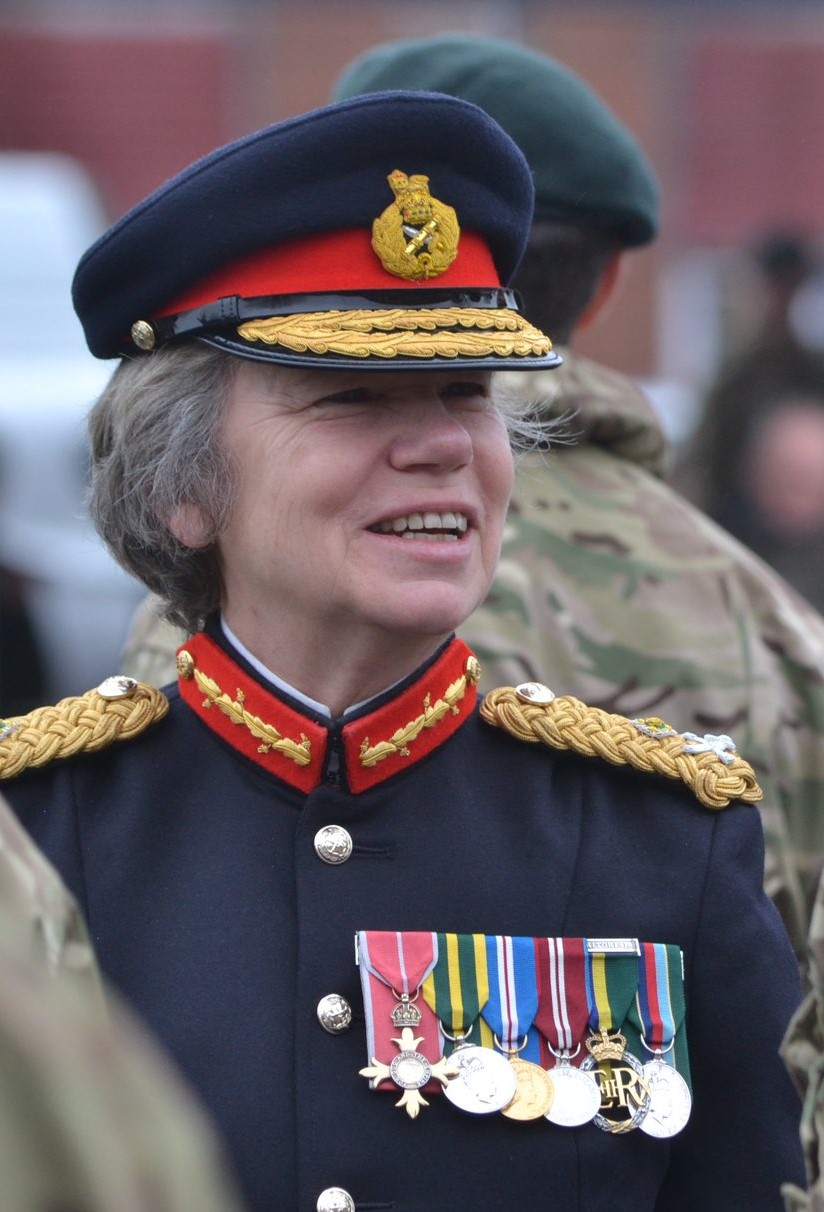
Major General Celia Harvey Inspecting Officer 2021

== Other interests ==
Harvey is now a tribunal judge in the War Pensions and Armed Forces Compensation Chamber, vice chair of the Army Museums Ogilby Trust (AMOT), and a trustee of the Victory Services Club.

Military offices
Preceded by William O'Leary	Deputy Commander Field Army (Reserves); 2020–2022	Succeeded by Aidan Smyth
