= General Palmer =

General Palmer may refer to:

== United Kingdom ==
- Anthony Palmer (British Army officer) (born 1949), British Army lieutenant general
- Arthur Power Palmer (1840–1904), British Indian Army general
- George Palmer (British Army officer) (1857–1932), British Army brigadier general
- Henry Spencer Palmer (1838–1893), British Army major general
- Michael Palmer (British Army officer) (1928–2017), British Army major general
- Patrick Palmer (British Army officer) (1933–1999), British Army general
- Sir Roger Palmer, 5th Baronet (1832–1910), British Army lieutenant general

== United States ==
- Bruce Palmer Jr. (1913–2000), U.S. Army four-star general
- Charles D. Palmer (1902–1999), U.S. Army four-star general
- Dave Richard Palmer (born 1934), U.S. Army lieutenant general
- Henry Palmer (surgeon) (1827–1895), Brigadier Surgeon of U.S. Volunteers and Surgeon General of Wisconsin
- Innis N. Palmer (1824–1900), Union Army brigadier general and brevet major general
- John McAuley Palmer (general) (1870–1955), U.S. Army brigadier general
- John M. Palmer (politician) (1817–1900), Union Army major general
- Joseph Palmer (American Revolutionary War general) (1716–1788), Continental Army brigadier general
- Joseph B. Palmer (1825–1890), Confederate States Army general
- William Jackson Palmer (1836–1909) U.S. Army brevet brigadier general
- Williston B. Palmer (1899–1973), U.S. Army four-star general

== See also ==
- Attorney General Palmer (disambiguation)
