= Marc Overton =

British businessman

Major General Marc Overton CB TD DL VR
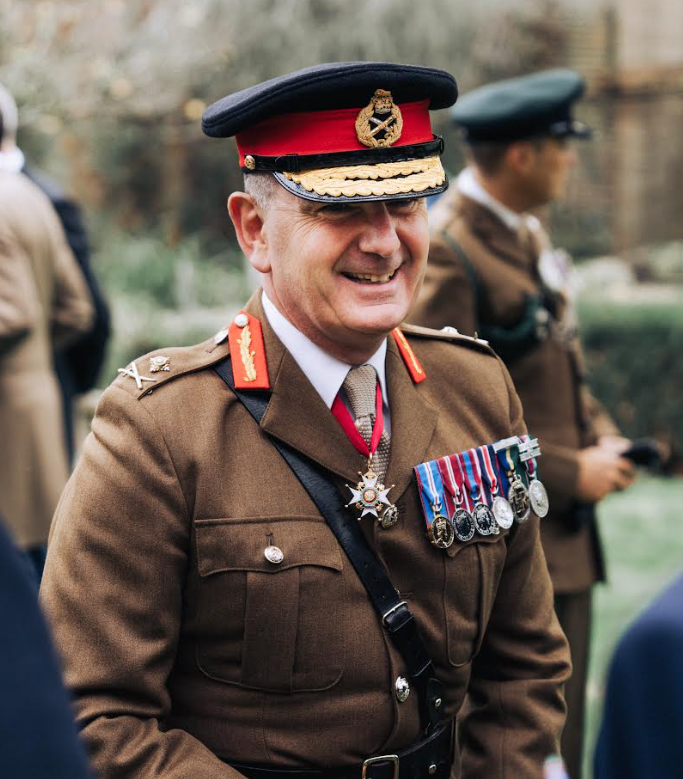
- Military career
- Allegiance: United Kingdom
- Branch: British Army
- Service years: 1989–present
- Rank: Major General
- Commands: Assistant Chief of the Defence Staff (Reserves and Cadets)
- Awards: Companion of the Order of the Bath; Territorial Decoration; Volunteer Reserves Service Medal

Major General Marc Anthony John McHardy Overton, CB, TD, DL, VR is a British information technology manager and senior Army Reserve officer.

== Military career ==
Overton joined 35th (South Midlands) Signal Regiment as a private soldier in 1987 and was commissioned into the London Regiment on 6 October 1989. Following a tour as Head of Reserves Strategy in Army Headquarters, he was appointed Assistant Chief of the Defence Staff (Reserves and Cadets) from June 2022 to 2026. In June 2026, Overton took over as Reserve Forces Advisor, the Army's senior Reservist.

Overton was appointed a Companion of the Order of the Bath (CB) in the 2025 New Year Honours.

== Civilian career ==
After working in several roles at Cisco Jasper, Overton became Chief Solutions Officer and Senior Vice President for EMEA and APAC at Sierra Wireless in 2017, managing director of BT Group's "Division X", part of its Enterprise business, in 2022, Euronorth managing director at Dassault Systèmes in 2023 and Managing Director at Roke Manor Research in 2025. He held the position of a non-executive director for Defence Equipment and Support from 2023 to 2025.

Overton was appointed a deputy lieutenant for Greater London in February 2022.

Military offices
Preceded by Simon Brooks-Ward	Assistant Chief of the Defence Staff (Reserves and Cadets); 2022–2026	Succeeded by Mark Lancaster, Baron Lancaster of Kimbolton
Incumbent
