= John Kendall (British Army officer) =

British Army officer

Major General John Kendall VR DL
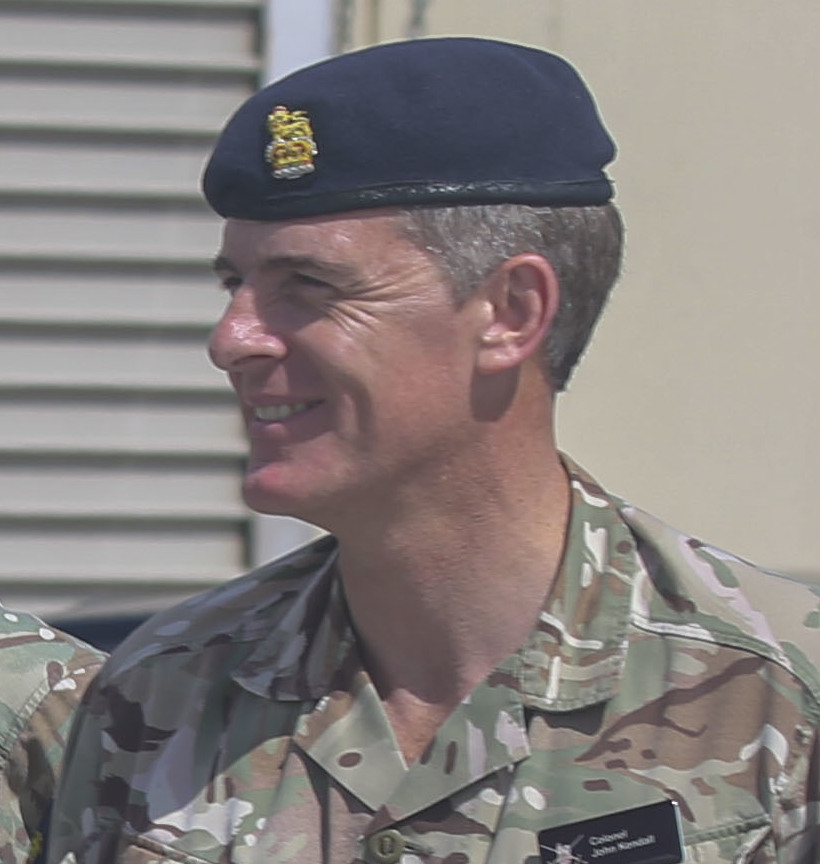
- Military career
- Allegiance: United Kingdom
- Branch: British Army
- Service years: –Present
- Rank: Major General

Major General John Richards Kendall, VR, DL is a senior Army Reserve officer.

== Military career ==
Kendall joined the 94 (Berkshire Yeomanry) Signal Squadron, as a signaller. He became Deputy Command (Reserves) 3rd (UK) Division and went on to be Deputy Commander Field Army (Reserves) in November 2024.

== Civilian career ==
Kendall is a senior research fellow with RAND Corporation.

Military offices
Preceded by Aidan Smyth	Deputy Commander Field Army (Reserves); 2024–present	Vacant
