= General Munro =

General Munro may refer to:

- Hector Munro, 8th laird of Novar (1726–1805), British Army general
- John Munro, 9th of Teaninich (1778–1858), British East India Company's Madras Army general
- Ranald Munro (born 1960), Royal Air Force major general
- Sir Thomas Munro, 1st Baronet (1761–1827), British East India Company's Madras Army general
- William Munro (botanist) (1818–1880), British Army general
