= General Deverell =

General Deverell may refer to:

- Christopher Deverell (fl. 1970s–2020s), British Army general
- Cyril Deverell (1874–1947), British Army general
- Jack Deverell (born 1945), British Army general
