= John Crackett =

British businessman and officer of the Army Reserve

Major General John Crackett CB TD VR
- Born: 19 December 1958 (age 67)
- Military career
- Allegiance: United Kingdom
- Branch: British Army
- Service years: 1980–2018
- Rank: Major General
- Service number: 511139
- Unit: Royal Corps of Signals
- Commands: Director reserves.
- Awards: Companion of the Order of the Bath; Territorial Decoration; Volunteer Reserves Service Medal
- Other work: Businessman

Major General John Crackett, CB, TD, VR (born 19 December 1958) is a British businessman and was an officer of the Army Reserve as the senior reservist of the British Armed Forces.

== Early life ==
Crackett was educated at Hymers College, a private school in Hull, East Riding of Yorkshire. He read engineering at the University of Cambridge.

== Career ==
Following graduation, he underwent postgraduate training with the Central Electricity Generating Board. He joined National Power following the privatisation of the UK electricity market in 1990. In 1995, he joined Ironbridge Power Station and was appointed Station Manager in 1997. In 2000, he was controller of TXU's power stations in the UK. He was managing director of Central Networks, which rebranded as E.ON UK in 2004. He served in a number of roles in E.ON UK. He was a member of the board with responsibility for safety, health, and environment, managing director of distribution, CEO and chairman. He retired in 2011.

Since 1996, he has been a trustee of Marches Energy Agency. In July 2011, he was appointed a non-executive board member of the Office of Nuclear Regulation.

=== Military service ===
On 12 June 1980, Crackett was commissioned into the Territorial and Army Volunteer Reserve of the British Army as a second lieutenant. He was given the service number 511139. On 1 April 1983, he transferred from the Group B Unposted List to Group A of the Royal Corps of Signals, Territorial Army. He retained the rank of second lieutenant (on probation) with seniority from 12 June 1980.

Crackett was promoted to colonel on 1 December 2002, and to brigadier on 17 August 2009.

On 1 April 2013, Crackett was promoted to major general. This made him the most senior reservist of the British Armed Forces. Crackett was appointed to the Army Board in April 2016. He retired as a major general in 2018 and took up an appointment of a lieutenant colonel in the Engineer and Logistic Staff Corps.

On 1 November 2011, he was appointed honorary colonel of the 37 Signal Regiment (Volunteers), and on 1 April 2024 he was appointed Honorary Colonel of the Royal Engineer Works Group Army Reserve.

== Personal life ==
Crackett is a Chartered Engineer. He is a Fellow of Institute of Electrical Engineers and a Fellow of Institute of Mechanical Engineers. He is a Member of the Worshipful Company of Engineers.

== Honours ==

Crackett was appointed Companion of the Order of the Bath in the 2015 New Year Honours. He has received the Territorial Decoration (TD) and the Volunteer Reserves Service Medal (VR).

Military offices
| Preceded by Greg Smith | Assistant Chief of the Defence Staff (Reserves and Cadets); 2013 to 2018 | Incumbent |
