= Angela Palmer =

Scottish artist and former journalist

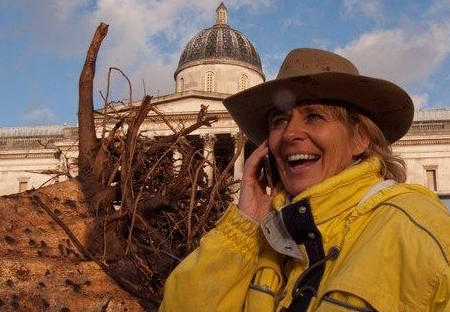
- Palmer with her installation The Ghost Forest in Trafalgar Square
- Born: Aberdeen, Scotland
- Education: University of Oxford, Royal College of Art
- Occupations: Artist and journalist
- Website: angelaspalmer.com

Angela Palmer (née Gordon) is a Scottish artist and former journalist. Before becoming an artist, Palmer had a career as a journalist: she was a columnist for The Daily Telegraph, Diary Editor of The Times, News Editor of The Observer, Magazine Editor of The Observer and Editor-in-chief of ELLE magazine.

She was awarded Young Journalist of the Year Scotland and was a runner-up in the Catherine Pakenham Award for Women Journalists. Palmer later followed a career as an artist and graduated from The Ruskin School of Drawing and Fine Art at Oxford University, and The Royal College of Art, London.

She now works as a sculptor with works in the permanent collections of The Scottish National Portrait Gallery in Edinburgh, The Ashmolean Museum in Oxford, The Smithsonian Air and Space Museum in Washington, The Wellcome Trust in London, The Science Museum in London, The Renault Art Collection in Paris. Palmer's work has been shown in the Summer Exhibition at the Royal Academy of Arts in London. Several of Palmer's works were exhibited at the Guggenheim's exhibition Motion, Autos, Art and Architecture (curated by Norman Foster).

Palmer's portrait, Susie Wolff: Portrait of a Racing Driver, is her second work in the permanent collection of The Scottish National Portrait Gallery. Her largest scale installation was The Ghost Forest, which was shown in Trafalgar Square in 2009. Sir John Leighton, Director-General of the National Galleries of Scotland, chose Palmer's Brain of the Artist to feature in his book 100 Masterpieces from the National Galleries of Scotland. The sculpture toured in a tri-national exhibition entitled From Rembrandt to the Selfie at the Kunsthalle in Karlsruhe; the Musee des Beaux-Arts in Lyon; and the Scottish National Portrait Gallery.

== Education ==
Palmer was educated at George Watson's College in Edinburgh. She was a Thomson trainee at the Edinburgh Evening News. At the Ruskin School of Drawing and Fine Art, Oxford University she was awarded the Waugh Scholarship and won the Fitzgerald Prize. She was also awarded the Thames and Hudson Prize at the Royal College of Art in London. Palmer is also the daughter-in-law of Major General Sir Joseph Michael Palmer, former Defence Services Secretary.

== Artwork ==
Palmer has developed a technique in which she uses MRI and CT scans to 'map' objects by drawing or engraving details onto multiple sheets of glass to create a layered 3D image which appears to float in a glass cube. For Brain of the Artist, 2012, (collection Scottish National Portrait Gallery), Palmer created a self-portrait using MRI scans of her brain, carried out at University College London. "The result is a most unusual and highly objective form of portraiture with a powerful, poignant beauty... which develops in a challenging way the concept of self-representation." Using CT scans, Palmer also recreated an Egyptian child mummy in glass, which is on permanent display in the Ashmolean Museum. The sculpture is exhibited next to the actual mummy, allowing viewers to see details of the child as a three-dimensional drawing without disturbing its bandages. Using this method, Palmer has also created portraits of Carol Vorderman, the novelist Robert Harris (who based a character's oeuvre on Palmer's art in his book The Fear Index); the head of Eclipse, the world's most famous racehorse, and an endangered green turtle from Bermuda.

Palmer developed this technique further by using NASA data from the Kepler Telescope to show its discovery of potentially habitable planets. Her sculpture, Searching for Goldilocks, is in the permanent collection of The Smithsonian Air and Space Museum in Washington.

In collaboration with Renault Formula 1, Palmer deconstructed the world's most successful engine used by Sebastian Vettel in four consecutive world championships, to create a body of sculpture by dramatically upscaling its components. Palmer collaborated with Nick Mason of Pink Floyd, to make a sound and light installation, tracing a century of the evolution of the eight-cylinder engine.

Using cross-sections, she also created the Rolls-Royce 'Ghost' in glass to raise funds for Breast Cancer Care; it is currently in the Rolls-Royce headquarters.

In her most recent project, The Geological Spine of Great Britain, she sourced rocks from every geological period to present a three-billion-year walk through the history of the nation. To illustrate the most recent geological epoch, the Anthropocene, marking the impact of man, Palmer created a faceted, rock-like structure in highly polished stainless steel, allowing the viewer to see his own reflection.

Palmer's self-portraits were selected for the 2019 and 2023 Ruth Borchard Self Portrait Award exhibition. Another of Palmer's self portraits was selected for the 2019 Scottish Portrait Awards touring exhibition.

== The Ghost Forest ==
The Ghost Forest was a large-scale installation by Palmer in which she brought ten primary rainforest tree stumps from a commercially logged forest in Ghana to Trafalgar Square in November 2009. Palmer wanted to highlight the shocking rate of deforestation. She said "Today, a tropical forest the size of a football pitch is destroyed every four seconds, affecting climate, biodiversity and the livelihoods of indigenous people. The trees in the Ghost Forest – most of which fell naturally in storms – are intended to represent rainforest trees worldwide; the absence of their trunks is presented as a metaphor for the removal of the world's lungs caused through the loss of our forests."

The installation was then exhibited outside the Danish Parliament building in Copenhagen during the UN Climate Change Conference; Oxford University's Museum of Natural History; and it is now in its permanent location at The National Botanic Garden of Wales. Kofi Annan, former Director General of the UN met the artist at the installation in Oxford and former First Lady of the United States, Michelle Obama arranged for pupils from her 'adopted' school, the Elizabeth Garrett Anderson School of North London to visit Palmer and The Ghost Forest during her official visit to Oxford University.^{[6]}
