= Admiral Allen (disambiguation) =

Thad Allen (born 1949) was a U.S. Coast Guard admiral. Admiral Allen may also refer to:

- David Allen (Royal Navy officer) (1933–1994), British Royal Navy rear admiral
- William Allen (Royal Navy officer) (1792–1864), British Royal Navy rear admiral

== See also ==
- John Allan (Canadian naval officer) (1928–2014), Canadian Forces vice admiral
- Sir Thomas Allin, 1st Baronet (1612–1685), British Royal Navy admiral
