= John Gower (disambiguation) =

This is a list of people named John Gower

- John Gower (c. 1330 – October 1408), English poet
- John Ronald Gower (April 7, 1912 – November 18, 2007), British Royal Navy captain
- John Gower (politician) (January 10, 1941 – December 10, 2011), American Republican politician.
- John Gower (British naval officer) (28 July 1960 - 12 February 2024), served as the Assistant Chief of the Defence Staff (Nuclear & Chemical, Biological)
