= Rodney Lees =

Royal Navy Rear Admiral (born 1944)

Rear Admiral Rodney Lees CVO
- Born: 31 December 1944 (age 81)
- Military career
- Allegiance: United Kingdom
- Branch: Royal Navy
- Service years: 1962-2001
- Rank: Rear admiral
- Awards: Commander of the Royal Victorian Order

Rear Admiral Rodney Burnett Lees, CVO (born 31 December 1944) is a former senior Royal Navy officer who served as Defence Services Secretary from 1998 to 2001.

== Naval career ==
Educated at Charterhouse School, Lees joined the Royal Navy in 1962. He decided to undertake legal training from 1974 and was called to the bar at Gray's Inn in 1976. He became Legal Advisor to the Commander-in-Chief, Naval Home Command in 1977, Deputy Chief Supply Officer (Pay) at the Ministry of Defence in 1980 and Supply Officer for the aircraft carrier HMS Illustrious in 1982. He went on to be Fleet Legal and Administration Officer in 1984, Secretary to the Chief of Fleet Support in 1986 and Deputy Command Secretary to the Commander-in-Chief Fleet in 1988. After that he became Secretary to the First Sea Lord in 1990, Director of Defence Personnel in 1992 and Chief of Staff to the Second Sea Lord in 1995. He served as Defence Services Secretary and Assistant Chief of Defence Staff (Personnel and Reserves) from 1998 to 2001.

== Family ==
In 1969 he married Rosemary Elizabeth Blake; they had two sons. Following the dissolution of his first marriage, he married Molly McEwen in 1982.

Military offices
Preceded by Peter Harding	Defence Services Secretary; 1998–2001	Succeeded by Christopher Elliott
