= Garry Tunnicliffe =

Royal Air Force officer

Air Vice-Marshal Garry Tunnicliffe CB CVO
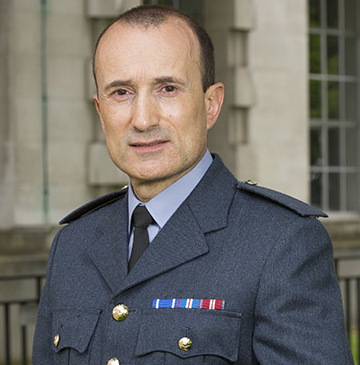
- Military career
- Allegiance: United Kingdom
- Branch: Royal Air Force
- Service years: 1988–present
- Rank: Air Vice-Marshal
- Commands: RAF Halton
- Awards: Companion of the Order of the Bath; Commander of the Royal Victorian Order

Air Vice-Marshal Garry Tunnicliffe, CB, CVO (born 14 October 1966) is a senior Royal Air Force officer who served as Defence Services Secretary from 2016 to 2019.

== Early life and education ==
Tunnicliffe was educated at Devonport High School for Boys, Durham University (BA History and Politics, 1988) and King's College London (MA Defence Studies, 2001).

== RAF career ==
Tunnicliffe joined the Royal Air Force on 14 August 1988. He became head of the RAF's Team of Management Consultants in 2006, station commander at RAF Halton in December 2008, and Assistant Chief of Staff, Training at No. 22 Group in December 2012. He went on to be Head of Armed Forces Remuneration at the Ministry of Defence in 2014, and became Assistant Chief of the Defence Staff (Personnel) as well as Defence Services Secretary on 27 June 2016. Tunnicliffe was appointed Commander of the Royal Victorian Order for his services as Defence Services Secretary on 27 March 2019. He became Deputy Commandant of the Royal College of Defence Studies on 26 April 2019.

Tunnicliffe was appointed a Companion of the Order of the Bath in the 2022 Birthday Honours.

Military offices
Preceded by Richard Nugee	Defence Services Secretary; 2016–2019	Succeeded by James Macleod
