= Leslie Townsend (Royal Navy officer) =

Rear-Admiral Sir Leslie Townsend KCVO CB
- Born: 22 February 1924
- Died: 13 January 1999 (aged 74)
- Military career
- Allegiance: United Kingdom
- Branch: Royal Navy
- Service years: 1942–1982
- Rank: Rear-Admiral
- Conflicts: World War II
- Awards: Knight Commander of the Royal Victorian Order; Commander of the Order of the British Empire

Rear-Admiral Sir Leslie William Townsend KCVO CBE (22 February 1924 – 13 January 1999) was a senior Royal Navy officer who served as Defence Services Secretary from 1979 to 1982.

== Naval career ==
Educated at Regent's Park School in Southampton, Townsend joined the Royal Navy in 1942 and saw action during World War II. He became secretary to the Vice-Chief of the Naval Staff in 1967 and secretary to the First Sea Lord in 1970. He went on to be military assistant to the Chief of the Defence Staff in 1971 and military assistant to the chairman of the NATO military committee in 1974 before becoming Director of Naval and Women's Royal Naval Service appointments in 1976. He served as Defence Services Secretary from 1979 to 1982, when he retired.

In retirement he was a member of the Lord Chancellor's Panel of Independent Inspectors.

== Family ==
In 1947 he married Ethel Majorie Bennet: they had one son and three daughters. She died in 2007.

Military offices
Preceded by Sir Brian Stanbridge	Defence Services Secretary; 1979–1982	Succeeded by Sir Michael Palmer
