= James Macleod (Royal Navy officer) =

Royal Navy Rear Admiral (born 1970)

Rear Admiral James Macleod CB CVO
- Born: 17 March 1970 (age 56)
- Military career
- Allegiance: United Kingdom
- Branch: Royal Navy
- Service years: 1989–2022
- Rank: Rear Admiral
- Conflicts: Iraq War
- Awards: Companion of the Order of the Bath; Commander of the Royal Victorian Order

Rear Admiral James Norman Macleod, CB, CVO (born 17 March 1970) is a senior Royal Navy officer.

== Education ==
Macleod also holds a Master of Science in Systems Engineering from Cranfield University and a Master of Arts in Defence Studies from King's College London.

== Naval career ==
Macleod joined the Royal Navy on 4 January 1989. He became Deputy Assistant Chief of Staff, Integrated Change Programme in March 2014, and Head of Armed Forces Remuneration at the Ministry of Defence in September 2016. After attending the Royal College of Defence Studies, he was appointed Assistant Chief of the Defence Staff (Personnel Capability) and Defence Services Secretary in March 2019, with promotion to rear-admiral from 27 March 2019. He retired from the navy on 14 September 2022.

Macleod was appointed Companion of the Order of the Bath (CB) in the 2020 Birthday Honours, and a Commander of the Royal Victorian Order in February 2022 on relinquishing his duties as Defence Services Secretary.

Military offices
Preceded by Garry Tunnicliffe	Defence Services Secretary; 2019–2022	Succeeded by Eldon Millar
