= Peter Wilkinson (Royal Navy officer) =

British Royal Navy admiral (born 1956)

Vice Admiral Peter Wilkinson CB CVO
- Born: 28 May 1956 (age 70)
- Military career
- Allegiance: United Kingdom
- Branch: Royal Navy
- Service years: 1975–2010
- Rank: Vice Admiral
- Commands: 2nd Submarine Squadron; HMS Vanguard; HMS Superb; HMS Otter
- Awards: Companion of the Order of the Bath; Commander of the Royal Victorian Order

Vice Admiral Peter John Wilkinson, CB, CVO (born 28 May 1956) is a retired senior Royal Navy officer who served as Deputy Chief of Defence Staff (Personnel) from 2007 to 2010. He was National President of the Royal British Legion from 2012 until 2016.

== Early life ==
Wilkinson was born on 28 May 1956. He was educated at the Royal Grammar School, High Wycombe, and the University of Wales, Lampeter, graduating with a Bachelor of Arts in 1978.

== Military career ==
Wilkinson joined the Royal Navy in 1975, where he initially served in submarines. He commanded the submarines HMS Otter, Superb, and Vanguard, being promoted to captain in 1995. He was captain of the 2nd Submarine Squadron from 1999 to 2001.

Wilkinson was the Director of Naval Service and Conditions (as a commodore) from 2001, and then Naval Secretary and Director-General Human Resources (Navy) from 2004. From 2005 to 2007 he was Defence Services Secretary and Assistant Chief of Defence Staff (Personnel and Reserves). He was promoted to vice admiral and appointed as Deputy Chief of the Defence Staff (Personnel) in August 2007. Wilkinson was appointed a Companion of the Order of the Bath in the 2010 Birthday Honours, and retired in August 2010.

== Later life ==
In retirement Wilkinson became chairman of Seafarers UK, a charity supporting seafarers in need and their dependants across the Royal Navy, Merchant Navy and Fishing Fleets, and Clerk of the Worshipful Company of Cooks. He is a trustee of the Armed Forces Memorial appeal, which has built a new memorial to service personnel who have lost their lives on duty. The memorial is located at the National Memorial Arboretum in Staffordshire. After the resignation of Lieutenant General Sir John Kiszely, he was appointed National President of the Royal British Legion in October 2012 and served until May 2016.

Military offices
Preceded by Mark Kerr	Naval Secretary; 2004–2005	Succeeded by Sir Richard Ibbotson
Preceded by David Pocock	Defence Services Secretary; 2005–2007	Succeeded by Matthew Sykes
Preceded by David Pocock	Deputy Chief of the Defence Staff (Personnel); 2007–2010	Succeeded by Sir William Rollo
Non-profit organization positions
Preceded by Sir John Kiszely	President of the Royal British Legion; 2012–2016	Succeeded by David Walker
