= Brian Pennicott =

British Army general (1938–2025)

Major-General Brian Pennicott CVO
- Born: 15 February 1938; Portsmouth, England
- Died: 18 June 2025 (aged 87)
- Military career
- Allegiance: United Kingdom
- Branch: British Army
- Service years: 1957–1994
- Rank: Major-General
- Commands: 29 Commando Regiment RA; Royal Artillery
- Conflicts: Falklands War
- Awards: Commander of the Royal Victorian Order

Major-General Brian Thomas Pennicott, CVO (15 February 1938 – 18 June 2025) was a British Army officer who served as Defence Services Secretary from 1991 to 1994.

== Military career ==
Pennicott was born in Portsmouth, England on 15 February 1938. Educated at Portsmouth Northern Grammar School and the Royal Military Academy Sandhurst, Pennicott was commissioned into the Royal Artillery in 1957. He became Commanding Officer of 29 Commando Regiment RA in 1977 and then joined the staff of the military secretary at the Ministry of Defence in 1980. He was Commander, Royal Artillery forces during the Falklands War and, as a witness, signed the Argentine surrender document. He went on to be Assistant Military Attaché in Washington D. C. in 1982, Commander, Royal Artillery for 1st Armoured Division in 1983 and deputy military secretary in 1987 before being appointed director, Royal Artillery in 1989. He was Defence Services Secretary from 1991 to 1994 as well as Assistant Chief of Defence Staff (Personnel and Reserves) from 1992 to 1994.

In retirement, he became group human resources director at Sun Alliance. He was also appointed a Gentleman Usher and was present at the funeral of the Queen Mother. Pennicott retired from this position at the end of 2007, though he was then moved to a position of being the Extra Gentleman Usher.

== Personal life and death ==
In 1962, he married Patricia Anne Chilcott; they had two sons and three daughters.

Pennicott died from cancer on 18 June 2025, at the age of 87.

Military offices
Preceded by Sir David Allen	Defence Services Secretary; 1991–1994	Succeeded by Peter Harding
