= David Pocock (RAF officer) =

Former British air force officer

Air Marshal David Pocock CB CVO
- Military career
- Allegiance: United Kingdom
- Branch: Royal Air Force
- Service years: 1974–2007
- Rank: Air Marshal
- Awards: Companion of the Order of the Bath; Commander of the Royal Victorian Order

Air Marshal David John Pocock, CB, CVO is a former senior Royal Air Force officer who served as Defence Services Secretary from 2004 to 2005.

== RAF career ==
Pocock joined the Royal Air Force in 1974. He served as Officer Commanding Support Wing at the joint RAF and Army base at Akrotiri before becoming briefing officer to the Chief of the Air Staff. He went on to be Group Captain in charge of the RAF estate in 1996, Air Commodore Plans at RAF Logistics Command in 1997 and Air Commodore Plans and Policy at RAF Personnel and Training Command in 1999. He became Officer responsible for Defence Pay & Allowances in 2000, Head of the Service Personnel Change Programme with promotion to air vice-marshal in January 2003 before serving as Defence Services Secretary and Assistant Chief of Defence Staff (Personnel and Reserves) from 2004 to 2005. He was promoted to air marshal in July 2005 and became Deputy Chief of the Defence Staff (Personnel) and retired in 2007. He was appointed Companion of the Order of the Bath (CB) in the 2008 New Year Honours.

== Retirement ==
In retirement Pocock became a board member of the Sector Skills Council for Central Government.

Military offices
Preceded by Christopher Elliott	Defence Services Secretary; 2004–2005	Succeeded by Peter Wilkinson
Preceded by Anthony Palmer	Deputy Chief of the Defence Staff (Personnel); 2005–2007	Succeeded by Peter Wilkinson
