= Brian Stanbridge =

Sir Brian Stanbridge
- Born: 6 July 1924
- Died: 12 February 2003 (aged 78)
- Military career
- Allegiance: United Kingdom
- Branch: Royal Air Force
- Service years: 1942–1979
- Rank: Air vice-marshal
- Conflicts: Second World War
- Awards: Knight Commander of the Royal Victorian Order; Commander of the Order of the British Empire; Air Force Cross; King's Commendation for Valuable Service in the Air

Air Vice Marshal Sir Brian Gerald Tivy Stanbridge, KCVO, CBE, AFC (6 July 1924 – 12 February 2003) was a senior Royal Air Force officer.

== RAF career ==
Stanbridge joined the Royal Air Force in 1942 and saw action in the Second World War as a pilot with No. 31 Squadron flying Dakotas on supply-dropping missions over Burma.

Stanbridge became a pilot in the Queen's Flight in 1954, serving as flying instructor to the Duke of Edinburgh. After attending the Royal Naval Staff College in 1958, he became Personal Staff Officer to the Air Officer Commanding-in-Chief, Coastal Command. He went on to be Wing Commander responsible for Flying at RAF St Mawgan in 1960 and, after attending the Joint Services Staff College in 1962, he joined the Directing Staff at the Staff College, Camberley at the end of the year. He transferred to the staff of the NATO Standing Group in Washington D. C. in 1966, became RAF Director at the Joint Anti-Submarine School at RAF Aldergrove later that year and was appointed Group Captain responsible for Operations at Headquarters RAF Coastal Command in 1968. He went on to be Air Commodore responsible for Operations and Training at Headquarters No. 18 Group in 1969, Secretary of the Chiefs of Staff Committee in 1971 and Assistant Commandant of the RAF Staff College in 1973. His last appointment was as Defence Services Secretary from 1975 until he retired in 1979.

== Later life ==
In retirement Stanbridge was Director-General of the Air Transport User's Committee. He was also President of the Royal Air Force Gliding & Soaring Association.

Military offices
Preceded by Sir Ronald Forrest	Defence Services Secretary; 1975–1979	Succeeded by Sir Leslie Townsend
