= Mayfield School, Portsmouth =

Mayfield School
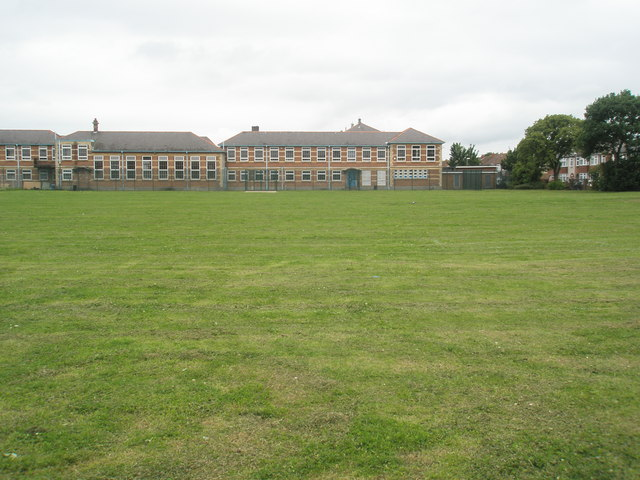

Location
- Mayfield Road; Portsmouth, Hampshire, PO2 0RH; England; 50.8204°N 1.0704°W

Information
- Type: Community comprehensive
- Established: 1932
- Local authority: Portsmouth
- Department for Education URN: 116463 Tables
- Ofsted: Reports
- Head teacher: Ashley Howard
- Gender: Mixed
- Age: 4 to 16
- Enrolment: 1215
- Website: http://www.mayfield.portsmouth.sch.uk

Mayfield School is a mixed all-through school for pupils ages 4 to 16 located in North End, Portsmouth.

== The school ==
The original school building was built in 1932 to the designs of architect Adrien J. Sharp in the Neo-Georgian style. It had a central hall, with classrooms arranged around East and West quadrangles. Additions were made to the rear in the 1950s and 1960s, with a new science and woodwork block and sports hall constructed in the 1970s. The building retained many of its original 1930s architectural features, including parquet flooring, wall tiling, fireplaces, stair balustrades and wooden windows and doors.

Funding for a new building was agreed in 2017, with a plan to demolish the existing building. This new school was ready for the 2021 September start of term and staff and students moved in and vacated the old building. Despite local opposition to demolition, the old building was demolished in early 2022, except for the front portico with its decorative frieze and Portsmouth crest mosaic.

== History ==
=== Grammar school ===
The school is located in the buildings of the former Portsmouth Northern Grammar School for Boys and Portsmouth Northern Grammar School for Girls, which were opened in 1932. (The boys school had begun as the Northern Secondary School in Kingston in 1921). After wartime evacuation, the two secondary schools were re-established in 1946 as a result of the Education Act 1944. The boys' school housed approximately 550 boys in 1970 and was run by the City of Portsmouth Education Committee.

=== Comprehensive ===
In 1975 the two schools were amalgamated with Brunel School (boys) and North End Modern Girls' School to form the largest comprehensive school in Portsmouth, with approximately 1800 pupils. The roll was later reduced by the setting up of Portsmouth's Sixth Form College with the school losing its sixth form.

In 1999, the school was failing academically and was placed in "special measures" after an Ofsted inspection said it was failing to provide an acceptable standard of education. With new teachers the school experienced a slight increase in academic achievement, with a 4% rise in GCSE achievement in 2004, compared with 2003.

In 2005, 150 students of the school launched a protest against the deportation of a fellow student who had previously immigrated from Syria in 2003 after fearing for her safety.

== Performing arts ==
In 2007, the school received the Special Performing Arts Status after raising £50,000. The school spent the money on a new dance and drama studio.

== House system ==
The school adopted a house system in 2011. The houses are Endeavour, Discovery, Intrepid and Victory, all named after historic British ships. The house system was in place prior to this with another house named Cardiff.

== Notable former pupils ==
=== Northern Grammar School for Boys ===
- John Armitt CBE, Chief Executive from 1997 to 2001 of Costain Group, from 2001 to 2002 of Railtrack, and from 2002 to 2007 of Network Rail, and chairman since 2007 of the Engineering and Physical Sciences Research Council (EPSRC) and Olympic Delivery Authority
- James Callaghan, Baron Callaghan of Cardiff, the UK Prime Minister from 1976 to 1979, completed his secondary education at the former (now Mayfield) Northern Secondary School in 1926.
- Sir Barry Cunliffe CBE, archaeologist
- Mike Donkin, former BBC world affairs correspondent
- Sir John Pestell, Chief Adjudicator on Immigration Appeals from 1970 to 1987 at Heathrow Airport
- Maj-Gen Brian Pennicott CVO, Colonel Commandant from 1991 to 1996 of the Royal Artillery

== See also ==
- Mayfield High School (London) in Dagenham
- The Portsmouth Grammar School - independent school, and former direct grant grammar school
