= Ronald Forrest =

Royal Navy Rear-Admiral (1923–2005)

Rear-Admiral Sir Ronald Forrest KCVO JP DL
- Born: 11 January 1923
- Died: 25 March 2005 (aged 82)
- Military career
- Allegiance: United Kingdom
- Branch: Royal Navy
- Service years: 1940–1975
- Rank: Rear-Admiral
- Commands: HMS London (1970–72); HMS Teazer (1956–58)
- Conflicts: Second World War
- Awards: Knight Commander of the Royal Victorian Order; Mentioned in dispatches

Rear-Admiral Sir Ronald Stephen Forrest, KCVO, JP, DL (11 January 1923 – 25 March 2005) was a senior Royal Navy officer who served as Defence Services Secretary from 1972 to 1975.

== Naval career ==
Educated at Belhaven Hill School and the Royal Naval College, Dartmouth, Forrest joined the Royal Navy in 1940 and saw action in the Second World War. He became Director of Seaman Officer Appointments at the Ministry of Defence in 1968, Commanding Officer of the destroyer HMS London in 1970 and Defence Services Secretary in 1972 before retiring in 1975.

In retirement he became Commander of the St John Ambulance in Devon.

Subsequently, he led the effort to purchase land for the Westpoint Arena near Exeter, in order to host the Devon County Show. He escorted Her Majesty Queen Elizabeth II during her visit to the Show in 1995, by which time the main ring had been named the Forrest Ring.

== Family ==
In 1947 he married Patricia Russell; they had two sons and one daughter. Following the death of his first wife, he married June Perks (née Weaver). Lady Forrest died in 2012.

Military offices
| Preceded by Sir Chandos Blair | Defence Services Secretary; 1972–1975 | Succeeded by Sir Brian Stanbridge |
