= Lionel Jarvis =

Royal Navy Surgeon Rear Admiral

Surgeon Vice-Admiral Lionel Jarvis CBE KStJ QHS FRCR DL
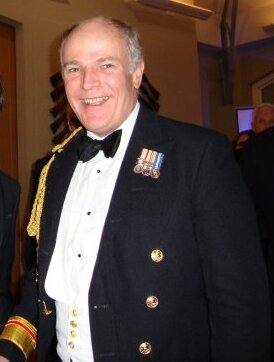
- Surgeon Rear Admiral Jarvis in 2010
- Military career
- Allegiance: United Kingdom
- Branch: Royal Navy
- Service years: 1977 - 2012
- Rank: Surgeon Rear Admiral
- Commands: MoD Hospital Unit Portsmouth; Royal Naval Hospital Haslar and Fort Blockhouse; Assistant Chief of the Defence Staff for Health
- Awards: Commander of the Order of the British Empire and Knight of the Order of St John

Surgeon Rear Admiral Lionel John Jarvis, CBE, KStJ, QHS, FRCR, DL is a British consultant radiologist. He was previously the Surgeon General of the Royal Navy and the Assistant Chief of the Defence Staff for Health. He served as the Royal Navy's Chief Medical Officer and Medical Director General (Naval) until April 2012. He was appointed as an Honorary Surgeon to the Queen (QHS) in 2006. He was both the Prior of England and the Islands of the Most Venerable Order of the Hospital of Saint John of Jerusalem and the Chair of St John Ambulance from 2016 to 2021.

== Early years ==
Lionel Jarvis trained at Guy's Hospital University of London, graduating in 1977 before joining the Royal Navy.

== Naval and medical career ==
Jarvis served originally at the Royal Naval Hospitals of Plymouth and Haslar, before going on to serve at HMS Cochrane in Rosyth and then on board HMS Jupiter, HMS Ambuscade, HMS Berwick, RFA Argus and HMS Amazon. After qualifying as a specialist in General Medicine, Jarvis was appointed as the General Physician for RNH Gibraltar from 1982 to 1984. Following this he served in the 1990/91 Gulf Conflict on RFA Argus.

After qualifying as a Consultant Radiologist in 1990, he returned to RNH Haslar and gained promotion to Surgeon Commander. During this tenure Jarvis was the Defence Consultant Advisor in Radiology from 1995 to 2002, responsible for worldwide diagnostic imaging for all UK armed services. He went on to serve with 34 Field Hospital in Iraq on TELIC 1 in 2003.

Jarvis was promoted to Surgeon Captain in 1999 and commanded the Ministry of Defence Hospital Unit Portsmouth. From here, he moved on to become the Commanding Officer (CEO) of the Royal Hospital Haslar (1999-2003, the UK's largest military hospital) and Fort Blockhouse (2001–03). He took Haslar through a period of substantial change, including merging it with a nearby military establishment and establishing partnership with the NHS. Jarvis served as an Honorary Executive Director of Portsmouth Hospitals NHS Trust during this complex period.

Jarvis attended The Royal College of Defence Studies in 2004 and was subsequently appointed as Deputy Director Medical Operations in the Royal Navy Fleet HQ in Portsmouth. This was followed by a promotion to Surgeon Commodore in 2005, upon which he was made the Director of Medical Policy in the Defence Medical Service Department of the Ministry of Defence.

Jarvis was then promoted to Surgeon Rear Admiral on 2 June 2008, and became the Assistant Chief of the Defence Staff for Health, responsible for managing oversight of UK and NATO military operations and healthcare delivered worldwide. He became the Chief Naval Medical Officer and the Medical Director General (Navy) in 2011, posts he vacated in April 2012. He was succeeded in post by Surgeon Commodore C. J. G McArthur. He retired from the Navy on 26 July 2012.

Jarvis moved with his wife to Qatar in 2012, taking on the posts of both Chief Executive and medical director of the new Heart Hospital in Hamad Medical Corporation. He established clinical and organisational governance in the hospital's early years, achieving external accreditation with Joint Commission International.

Jarvis has co-authored a number of publications relating to the effects of climate change on the medical world; a topic which he is passionate about. He has published over 20 peer-reviewed articles and book chapters with special interests in musculoskeletal and interventional radiology. His numerous publications and lectures have covered many areas of global public health.

As well as serving on the Faculty Board of Clinical Radiology, on the UK National Information Governance Board, as part of the Academy of Colleges Information Group, and on a number of other national academic UK committees, Jarvis was the Chairman of the IT Committee of the Royal College of Radiologists. He is a member of the British Executive Overseas Service and was elected a Member of the Institute of Electrical Engineers (now the Institute of Engineering and Technology) in 2003 for advances in telemedicine. Jarvis was the scientific advisor to the centenary Scott Antarctic expedition, is currently President of The Poppy Factory, and was trustee of the Royal Navy & Royal Marines Children's Fund. He was appointed as the Prior of England and the Islands of the Most Venerable Order of the Hospital of Saint John of Jerusalem in June 2016.

Jarvis has won many prestigious awards during his career. These include operational awards (campaign medals) from the UK government, Kuwait and the Kingdom of Saudi Arabia. Other awards include the RCR Travelling Fellowship in 1995 (to work at the University of California on trauma radiology), the Erroll-Eldridge Prize in 1998 (for developing the Defence Magnetic Resonance Imaging), the UK Diagnostic Imaging Doctor of the Year in 1999, and the Royal College of Radiologists Crookshank Medal in 2007. He was appointed as a Commander of the Order of the British Empire (CBE) in the 2012 New Year Honours. In the same year Jarvis was also appointed as an Officer Brother (OStJ) of the Most Venerable Order of the Hospital of Saint John of Jerusalem. He was promoted to a Knight of the Order (KStJ) in June 2016, at which time he simultaneously took on the role of the Order's Prior of England and the Islands and became Chair of St John Ambulance. Jarvis stepped down from his Prior and Chair roles on 11 November 2021 due to personal health concerns.

== Personal life ==
Jarvis is married to Dr Penelope Gordon, who is also a consultant radiologist. They have four children.
