= Deputy Commander Field Army (United Kingdom) =

Deputy Commander of the British Army fighting forces

The Deputy Commander Field Army is a senior British Army officer who serves as deputy to the Commander Field Army. It currently is held by an Army Reserve officer.

== History ==
The UK Field Army was first established in 1982 when the Deputy Commander-in-Chief at UK Land Forces was designated Commander of that formation. In 1995 the designation changed to Deputy Commander-in-Chief, Land Command. The Field Army was re-established in 2003, under the LANDmark reorganisation. The Commander of the Field Army had two deployable Divisions (1st Armoured Division and 3rd Mechanised Division), HQ 6th Division, Theatre Troops, Joint Helicopter Command, and Training Support under him. The post of Commander Field Army ceased to exist from 1 November 2011 following a major army command reorganisation. The post of Deputy Commander Land Forces was recreated again in January 2012.

== Recent Deputy Commanders ==
Recent Commanders have been:
Deputy Commander-in-Chief UK Land Forces

- 1972-1973 Lieutenant-General Sir Frank King
- 1973-1976 Lieutenant-General Sir Allan Taylor
- 1976-1977 Lieutenant-General Sir Hugh Beach
- 1977-1980 Lieutenant-General Sir Peter Hudson
- 1980-1982 Lieutenant-General Sir Frank Kitson

Commander UK Field Army

- 1982-1984 Lieutenant-General Sir Edward Burgess
- 1984-1987 Lieutenant-General Sir John Akehurst
- 1987-1990 Lieutenant-General Sir David Ramsbotham
- 1990-1993 Lieutenant-General Sir Michael Wilkes
- 1993-1994 Lieutenant-General Sir Michael Rose
- 1994-1995 Lieutenant-General Sir Richard Swinburn

Deputy Commander-in-Chief Land Command

- 1995-1997 Lieutenant-General Sir Hew Pike
- 1997-2001 Lieutenant-General Sir Jack Deverell

== Recent Deputy Commanders (Reserves) ==
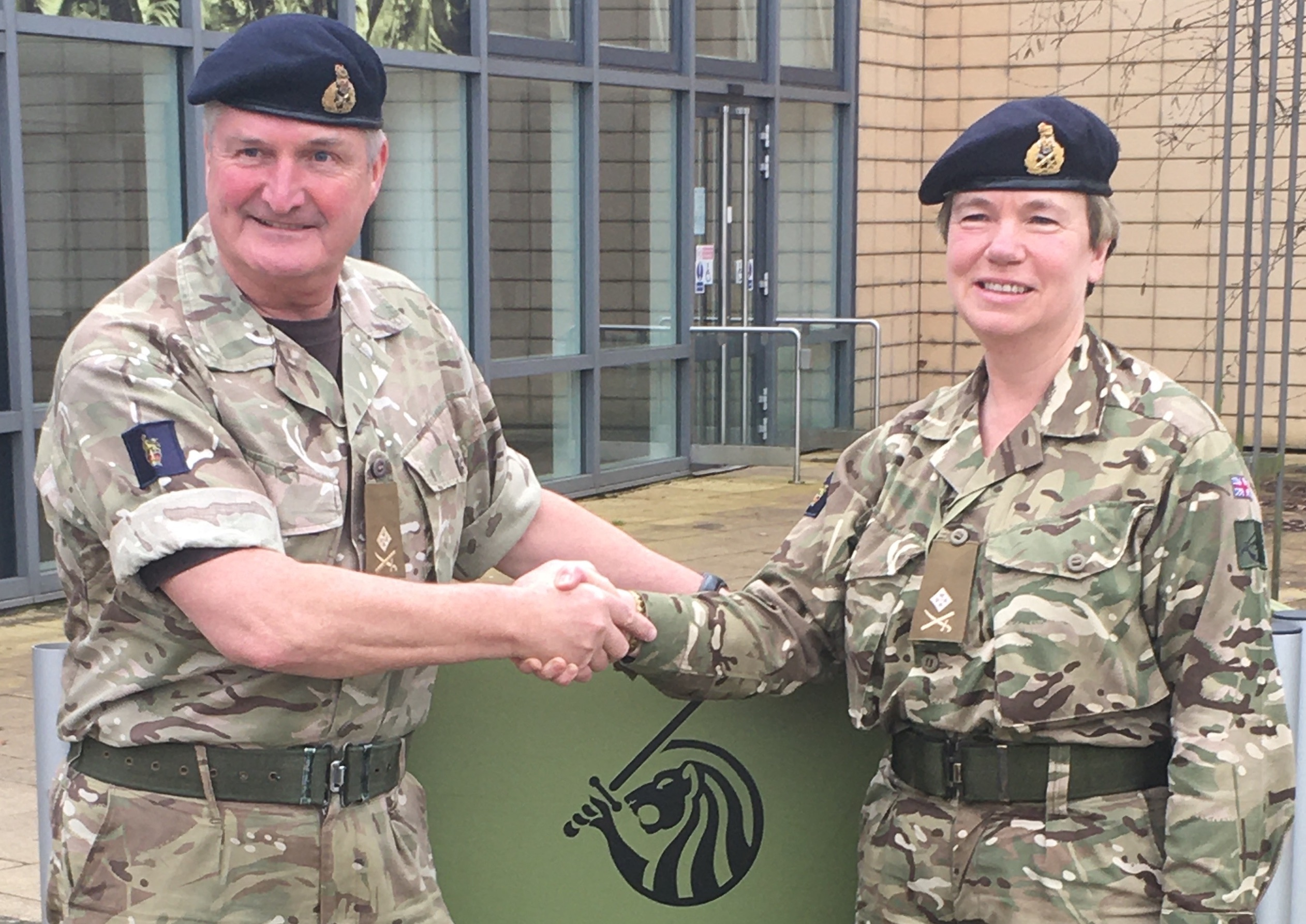
Major General William O'Leary (left) and Major General Celia Harvey

In 2011 a two-star appointment was created for the officer commanding the Territorial Army; this officer has inherited the above designation. This now has separated. Recent Commanders for the Territorial Army/Army Reserves have been:

Deputy Commander Land Forces (Reserves)

- 2011–2012 Major-General Gerald Grosvenor, 6th Duke of Westminster

Deputy Commander Land Forces

- 2012–2015 Major-General Ranald Munro

Deputy Commander Field Army (Reserves)

Deputy Commander, Field Army (Reserves)
Image	Rank	Name	Term began	Term ended	Ref
	Major General	Simon Brooks-Ward	October 2015	January 2018	
	Major General	William O'Leary	January 2018	March 2020	
	Major General	Celia Harvey	March 2020	March 2022	
	Major General	Aidan Smyth	April 2022	January 2025	
	Major General	John Kendall	November 2024		
