= Chandos Blair =

British Army general (1919–2011)

Lieutenant-General Sir Chandos Blair KCVO OBE MC*
- Born: 25 February 1919; Edinburgh, Scotland
- Died: 22 January 2011 (aged 91); Gullane, East Lothian, Scotland
- Relatives: David Blair (brother)
- Military career
- Allegiance: United Kingdom
- Branch: British Army
- Service years: 1939–1976
- Rank: Lieutenant-General
- Nickname: "Chan"
- Service number: 85689
- Unit: Seaforth Highlanders
- Commands: Scottish Command (1972–1976); 2nd Division (1968–70); 4th Battalion, King's African Rifles (c. 1959–1961)
- Conflicts: Second World War
- Awards: Knight Commander of the Royal Victorian Order; Officer of the Order of the British Empire; Military Cross & Bar

Lieutenant-General Sir Chandos Blair, KCVO, OBE, MC & Bar (25 February 1919 – 22 January 2011) was a senior British Army officer who served as General Officer Commanding Scottish Command from 1972 to 1976.

== Military career ==
He was the son of Arthur Blair DSO (1869–1947) of the King's Own Scottish Borderers, and his second wife Elizabeth Mary Hoskyns, daughter of Colonel Sir Chandos Hoskyns, 10th Baronet of the Royal Engineers. He was educated at Harrow School and the Royal Military College, Sandhurst, and was commissioned as a second lieutenant into the Seaforth Highlanders on 26 January 1939.

Blair served in the Second World War with the 2nd and 7th Battalions of his regiment. Serving with the 2nd Battalion, which formed part of the 51st (Highland) Division, in 1940, the battalion was forced to surrender at Dunkirk, and he became a prisoner of war at the Oflag V-B camp at Biberach in Baden-Württemberg. He escaped to Switzerland and from there to Spain and to Gibraltar. As such he was the first officer to return home after escaping from a prisoner of war camp. Blair was awarded the Military Cross for his exploits. He later served with the 7th Battalion, Seaforths, which formed part of the 15th (Scottish) Infantry Division, and was with the battalion throughout the campaign in Northwest Europe, landing in Normandy shortly after D-Day in June 1944 and fighting until Victory in Europe Day almost exactly eleven months later.

In 1959, Blair was appointed commanding officer of the 4th Battalion of the King's African Rifles. He was made General Officer Commanding 2nd Division in British Army of the Rhine in 1968 and then became Defence Services Secretary in 1970. His last appointment was as General Officer Commanding Scotland and Governor of Edinburgh Castle in 1972; in that capacity, Prime Minister Harold Wilson dispatched him as a Special Envoy to secure the release of Denis Hills, a British subject held on spying charges by President Idi Amin of Uganda. Blair retired in 1976.

== Family ==
In 1947 Blair married Audrey Mary Travers; they had one son and one daughter. His elder brother David was an amateur golfer and best-man at the wedding of Chandos and Audrey.

Military offices
Preceded by John Sharp	General Officer Commanding 2nd Division; 1968–1970	Succeeded by Rollo Pain
Preceded by Sir Alan Boxer	Defence Services Secretary; 1970–1972	Succeeded by Sir Ronald Forrest
Preceded by Sir Henry Leask	General Officer Commanding Scotland; 1972–1976	Succeeded by Sir David Scott-Barrett
