= Alan Boxer =

Royal Air Force air marshal

Sir Alan Boxer
- Born: 1 December 1916; Hastings, New Zealand
- Died: 26 April 1998 (aged 81); Hampshire, England
- Military career
- Allegiance: United Kingdom
- Branch: Royal Air Force
- Service years: 1939–1970
- Rank: Air Vice Marshal
- Commands: RAF Wittering (1957–59); No. 7 Squadron (1956–57); No. 161 Squadron (1943)
- Conflicts: Second World War; Korean War
- Awards: Knight Commander of the Royal Victorian Order; Companion of the Order of the Bath; Distinguished Service Order; Distinguished Flying Cross; Silver Cross of the Virtuti Militari (Poland); Bronze Star Medal (United States); Air Medal (United States)

Air Vice Marshal Sir Alan Hunter Cachemaille Boxer, KCVO, CB, DSO, DFC (1 December 1916 – 26 April 1998) was a senior Royal Air Force officer.

== Early life ==
Boxer was born in Hastings, New Zealand, on 1 December 1916, and was educated at Nelson College from 1927 to 1935.

== RAF career ==
Boxer joined the Royal Air Force in January 1939 and saw service during the Second World War as a pilot with No. 161 Squadron at RAF Tempsford, as a flight commander with No. 138 Squadron and then as Commanding Officer of No. 161 Squadron from 1943. He continued his war service on the staff in the Directorate of Intelligence at the Air Ministry from September 1943 and then on the staff at Headquarters RAF Bomber Command from February 1945.

Boxer remained in the Royal Air Force after the war. Boxer flew B-29s over Korea while on secondment to the USAF. He became Officer Commanding No. 7 Squadron in 1956, Station Commander at RAF Wittering in 1958 and Group Captain responsible for Plans at Headquarters Bomber Command in 1959. He went on to be Senior Air Staff Officer at Headquarters No. 1 Group in 1963, Senior Air Staff Officer at Headquarters RAF Bomber Command in 1965 and Defence Services Secretary in 1967 before retiring in 1970.

Military offices
Preceded by Sir Ian Hogg	Defence Services Secretary; 1967–1970	Succeeded by Sir Chandos Blair
