= Peter Harding (RAF officer, born 1940) =

Royal Air Force officer (1940–2013)

Air Vice-Marshal Peter Harding CB CVO CBE AFC
- Born: 1 June 1940
- Died: 27 December 2013 (aged 73)
- Military career
- Allegiance: United Kingdom
- Branch: Royal Air Force
- Service years: 1960–1998
- Rank: Air Vice-Marshal
- Commands: RAF Honington (1982–84); No. 12 Squadron RAF (1977–80)
- Awards: Companion of the Order of the Bath; Commander of the Royal Victorian Order; Commander of the Order of the British Empire; Air Force Cross

Air Vice-Marshal Peter John Harding, CB, CVO, CBE, AFC (1 June 1940 – 27 December 2013) was a senior Royal Air Force officer who served as Defence Services Secretary from 1994 to 1998.

== RAF career ==
Educated at Solihull School, Harding joined the Royal Air Force (RAF) in 1960. His initial assignment after completing Initial Officer Training was on the Canberra bomber which he flew from Akrotiri in Cyprus with No. 249 Squadron as part of the Near East Air Force. He then became an instructor, completing a tour at the RAF College, Cranwell during which time he was promoted to flight lieutenant. Following this he was part of the staff at HQ Air Support Command working on Project Trenchard.

Harding returned to operational flying on the Vulcan bomber, completing the conversion course and then a short tour back on Cyprus at part of No. 9 Squadron. Promoted to squadron leader at the beginning of 1972 he was posted to No. 44 Squadron at Waddington as a flight commander before attending the Royal Naval Staff College ahead of being appointed as personal staff officer to the Commander-in-Chief, RAF Germany at RAF Rheindahlen.

In 1976 Harding was promoted to wing commander and converted to the Buccaneer with No. 237 OCU at Honington. Following this he was appointed as Officer Commanding No. 12 Squadron, also at Honington, in December 1977, with his time in command including overseeing the squadron's move north to Lossiemouth and the absorption of personnel from No. 216 Squadron. Completing this, he then spent a year on the staff of the RAF Staff College, Bracknell.

Promoted to group captain on 1 January 1982, Harding then trained on a fourth front-line type, the new Panavia Tornado, at the Tri-National Tornado Training Establishment at Cottesmore. After this he returned to Honington, this time as the station commander.

After leaving Honington, Harding attended the Royal College of Defence Studies, and after promotion to air commodore, became the Director of Defence Nuclear Systems at the Ministry of Defence. Promoted to air vice-marshal in 1989 he became Deputy Commander-in-Chief, RAF Germany in 1989, Deputy Chief of Staff (Operations) at Headquarters Allied Air Forces Central Europe in 1991, and lastly Defence Services Secretary and Assistant Chief of the Defence Staff (Personnel) in 1994 before his retirement in 1998.

== Later life ==
After retirement Harding moved to the Quantocks in Somerset where he became heavily involved in both the local church and school communities, amongst them Deputy Chairman of the Board of Governors of Taunton School. Harding suffered a spinal stroke in 2007 that left him severely disabled and unable to walk. He died on 27 December 2013.

== Family ==
In 1966 Harding married Morwenna Jacquiline St John Grey; they had two sons, Jonathan and Philip. In 1997 he was the reviewing officer of No 22 Rotary Wing Advanced Flying Course at RAF Shawbury where he was able to present Philip with his pilot wings as one of the graduates from the course.

Military offices
| Preceded by Brian Pennicott | Defence Services Secretary; 1994–1998 | Succeeded by Rodney Lees |
