= Hew Pike =

British Army general (born 1943)

Lieutenant General Sir Hew Pike KCB DSO MBE
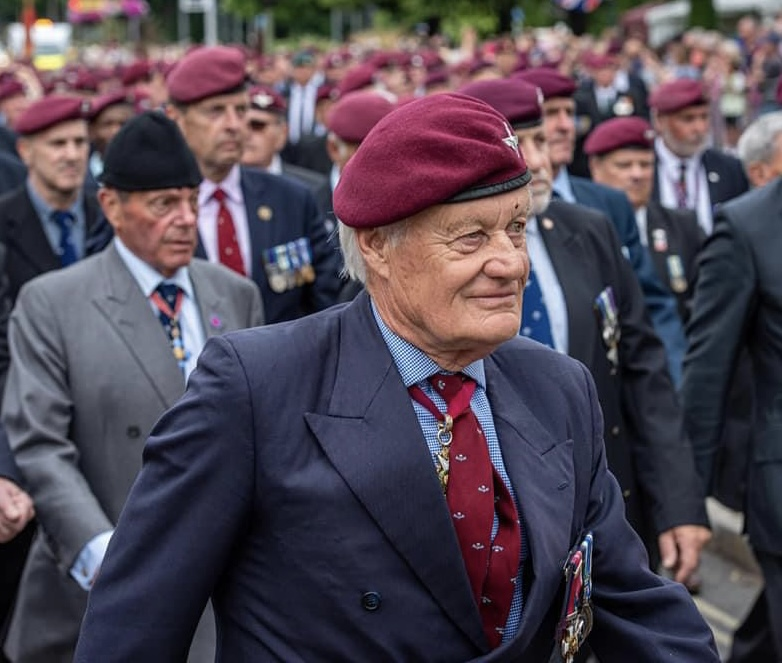
- Sir Hew Pike at the Falklands 40 Parade in Aldershot - 18 June 2022
- Born: 24 April 1943 (age 83); Bentley, Hampshire
- Relatives: Sir William Pike (father)
- Military career
- Allegiance: United Kingdom
- Branch: British Army
- Service years: 1962–2001
- Rank: Lieutenant General
- Service number: 472599
- Unit: Parachute Regiment
- Commands: Director of Operations – SFOR; Royal Military Academy Sandhurst; 3rd (UK) Division; 22 Armoured Brigade; 3rd Battalion, Parachute Regiment
- Conflicts: Aden Emergency; Falklands War; Operation Banner
- Awards: Knight Commander of the Order of the Bath; Distinguished Service Order; Member of the Order of the British Empire; Mentioned in despatches
- Other work: Author

Lieutenant General Sir Hew William Royston Pike, KCB, DSO, MBE (born 24 April 1943) is a retired senior British Army officer known for his service in the Falklands War and for his command in Northern Ireland.

== Education and early career ==
The son of army officer Lieutenant General Sir William Pike, Pike was educated at Winchester College and Royal Military Academy Sandhurst, and commissioned into The Parachute Regiment as a second lieutenant on 21 December 1962. He served as a platoon commander in Bahrain and saw active service in the Aden Emergency. He was promoted lieutenant on 21 June 1964, and captain on 21 December 1968. For much of the 1970s, he was in Northern Ireland and the United Kingdom. He attended the Staff College, Camberley in 1975, was promoted major on 30 June 1975, and was then appointed brigade major of 16th Parachute Brigade. During his period there, the unit underwent a major reorganisation becoming 6th Field Force, Pike was largely responsible for the writing of the initial concept study detailing the proposed new structure, and also for its implementation, something which required cooperation from other army units, and the Royal Air Force, as well as liaison with NATO headquarters. As a result, he was appointed Member of the Order of the British Empire (MBE) in the 1978 New Year Honours, the recommendation for the award concluded: "his careful planning [has] undoubtedly saved much time and money. He has surpassed all that would normally be expected for an officer of his rank and age." From 1978 he was a company commander in 3rd Battalion, The Parachute Regiment (3PARA).

== Falklands War ==
Pike was promoted lieutenant colonel on 30 June 1980, and became commanding officer of 3PARA. On 6 October 1981 he was Mentioned in Despatches for his command of the battalion while in Northern Ireland. He was still CO when Argentina invaded the Falkland Islands in 1982, triggering the Falklands War. The battalion was attached to 3 Commando Brigade to bring that unit up to full strength. He landed with his battalion in San Carlos bay on 21 May. Due to the lack of transport helicopters, lost when the transport ship Atlantic Conveyor was sunk, the battalion had to cover the difficult terrain on foot. 3PARA was engaged in one of the fiercest encounters of the war in the Battle of Mount Longdon. His men suffered heavy casualties taking the mountain in a battle that lasted from 9pm to 7am the next day. Pike was awarded the Distinguished Service Order for his "cool example and inspiring leadership". The award was recommended by the brigade commander, Brigadier Julian Thompson, and "Very strongly recommended" by the other senior commanders, Major General Jeremy Moore, Lieutenant General Sir Richard Trant and Admiral Sir John Fieldhouse. He relinquished command of 3PARA in 1983.

== Later career and retirement ==
Pike then held staff positions, first with I Corps and then at the School of Infantry. He was promoted colonel on 30 June 1985, and brigadier on 31 December 1987 (with seniority from 30 June 1987). From 1987 to 1989 he commanded 22 Armoured Brigade in Germany. After attending the Royal College of Defence Studies, he was promoted acting Major General on 13 April 1992 (substantive from 1 June 1992) and was made general officer commanding (GOC), 3rd (UK) Division until 11 April 1994. He was then made Commandant of the Royal Military Academy Sandhurst from 1 May 1994. He was also appointed to the honorary positions of Colonel Commandant of the Small Arms School Corps on 1 April 1992, holding that post until 1 December 1997. On 1 July 1995 he was promoted acting lieutenant general and appointed Deputy Commander-in-Chief Land Command and Inspector General Territorial Army. He received substantive promotion on 9 September 1995 (with seniority from 30 June), and was appointed Knight Commander of the Order of the Bath in the 1997 New Year Honours. On 23 November 1997 was appointed as Director of Operations (DCOMOPS) of the NATO SFOR in Bosnia and Herzegovina. From 26 October 1998 to 2000 was GOC and Director of Operations in Northern Ireland. On 1 July 1999 he was appointed Honorary Colonel, Royal Rifle Volunteers, Territorial Army, and held that post until 1 September 2003. He retired as a lieutenant general on 14 March 2001.

In retirement, Pike has written of his family history.

== Publications ==
- From the Front Line – Family Letters & Diaries: 1900 to the Falklands & Afghanistan. (2008) ISBN 978-1-84415-812-6.

Military offices
Preceded by Christopher Wallace	General Officer Commanding the 3rd (UK) Division; 1992–1994	Succeeded by Mike Jackson
Preceded by Timothy Toyne Sewell	Commandant of the Royal Military Academy Sandhurst; 1994–1995	Succeeded by Jack Deverell
Preceded by Sir Richard Swinburn	Deputy Commander-in-Chief Land Command; 1995–1997	Succeeded by Sir Jack Deverell
Preceded by Sir Rupert Smith	General Officer Commanding the British Army in Northern Ireland; 1998–2000	Succeeded by Sir Alistair Irwin
