= Attorney General Palmer =

Attorney General Palmer may refer to:

- A. Mitchell Palmer (1872–1936), Attorney General of the United States
- Edward Palmer (Canadian politician) (1809–1889), Attorney General of the Colony of Prince Edward Island
- Geoffrey Palmer (New Zealand politician) (born 1942), Attorney-General of New Zealand
- Henry Wilbur Palmer (1839–1913), Attorney General of Pennsylvania
- James Bardin Palmer (1771–1833), Attorney General of the Colony of Prince Edward Island
- Roundell Palmer, 1st Earl of Selborne (1812–1895), Attorney General for England and Wales
- Sir Geoffrey Palmer, 1st Baronet (1598–1670), Attorney General for England and Wales

== See also ==
- General Palmer (disambiguation)
