= Ranald Munro =

Air Vice-Marshal Ranald Munro CB CBE TD VR DL
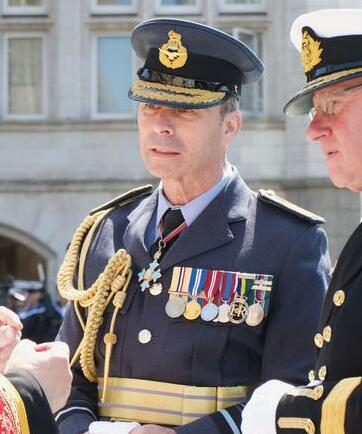
- Air Vice-Marshal Munro in 2023
- Born: 1960 (age 65–66)
- Military career
- Allegiance: United Kingdom
- Branch: Army Reserve (1986–2019); Royal Auxiliary Air Force (2019–present)
- Service years: 1986–present
- Rank: Air Vice-Marshal
- Conflicts: Iraq War
- Awards: Companion of the Order of the Bath; Commander of the Order of the British Empire; Territorial Decoration; Volunteer Reserves Service Medal

Air Vice-Marshal Ranald Torquil Ian Munro, CB, CBE, TD, VR, DL (born 1960) is a general counsel and company secretary; he was a senior officer in the Army Reserve before transferring to the Royal Auxiliary Air Force.

== Career ==
=== Civilian ===
Educated at Merchiston Castle School, Middlesex Polytechnic and the Polytechnic of Central London, Munro trained as a barrister at the Inns of Court School of Law and was called to the bar in 1986 before becoming a senior prosecutor at the Crown Prosecution Service. He then worked for International Computers (now Fujitsu) and L'Oréal UK before becoming General counsel and company secretary for Chubb Insurance company of Europe in 1997. He joined SCOR SE in 2015 as their Chief Legal Officer.

=== Military ===
Munro was commissioned into the 10th Battalion The Parachute Regiment (Territorial Army) in 1986. Promoted to lieutenant colonel, he became Chief Instructor to the London District Specialist Training Team in 1998. He went on to be Staff Officer responsible for Territorial Army operations and Training in 2001, commanding officer of Bristol University Officers Training Corps in 2002 and then full-time Chief of Military Operations (Operational Law) in the Office of the Staff Judge Advocate in Baghdad in May 2005. On his return to the United Kingdom, he became part-time Colonel Territorial Army at the Directorate of Individual Training (Army) in October 2005, Deputy Commander 43rd (Wessex) Brigade in April 2008 and Colonel (Reserves) on the General Staff in January 2009. Having been promoted to brigadier, he became Assistant Commander the 4th Division in November 2009, Assistant Commander Support Command in January 2012 and, having been promoted to major general, Deputy Commander Land Forces (Reserves) later that year.

Munro was Assistant Chief of the Defence Staff (Reserves and Cadets), the senior tri-service reservist in the UK Armed Forces. Munro became Commandant General Royal Auxiliary Air Force in the rank of air vice-marshal with effect from 23 September 2019. His service was extended for two years in 2023, and he was appointed an aide-de-camp to King Charles III on 6 December 2024.

Munro was appointed Commander of the Order of the British Empire (CBE) in the 2014 Birthday Honours and Companion of the Order of the Bath (CB) in the 2023 Birthday Honours.

Military offices
Preceded by The Duke of Westminster	Deputy Commander Land Forces (Reserves); 2012–2015	Succeeded by Simon Brooks-Ward
Preceded by Lord Beaverbrook	Commandant General Royal Auxiliary Air Force; 2019–present	Incumbent
