= David Hobart (RAF officer) =

British executive, aeronautical engineer and former Royal Air Force officer

Air Vice-Marshal David Hobart CB LVO
- Born: 24 December 1951 (age 74)
- Allegiance: United Kingdom
- Branch: Royal Air Force
- Rank: Air Vice-Marshal
- Education: Open University; Magdalene College, Cambridge

Air Vice-Marshal David Anthony Hobart, CB, LVO (born 24 December 1951) is a British executive, aeronautical engineer, and former Royal Air Force (RAF) officer. Having been commissioned into the RAF in 1972, he reached the rank of air vice-marshal and served as Assistant Chief of the Defence Staff (Policy) from 2001 to 2004. Following retirement from the military, he was chief executive of the Bar Council from 2004 to 2011, and has been chief executive of the City of London Law Society since 2011. He also served as Gentleman Usher to Queen Elizabeth II.

== Early life and education ==
Hobart was born on 24 December 1951. He studied at Magdalene College, Cambridge, graduating with a Master of Philosophy (MPhil) degree in 1991. He studied law with the Open University, graduating Bachelor of Laws (LLB): he is not qualified as a solicitor nor barrister.

== Military career ==
On 25 February 1972, Hobart was commissioned into the Engineer Branch of the Royal Air Force as a pilot officer. He was promoted to flying officer on 25 February 1973, and to flight lieutenant on 25 August 1977. As part of the half-yearly promotions, he was promoted to squadron leader on 1 January 1983, to wing commander on 1 July 1988, and to group captain on 1 January 1995.

Promoted to air commodore, Hobart served as Director of Defence Programmes at the Ministry of Defence between 1998 and 2001. He was promoted to air vice-marshal in 2001, and served as Assistant Chief of the Defence Staff (Policy) from 2001 to 2004. He retired from the Royal Air Force on 10 January 2005.

He was appointed Companion of the Order of the Bath (CB) in the 2004 Birthday Honours and Lieutenant of the Royal Victorian Order (LVO) in the 2022 Birthday Honours.
