= Richard Peirse (RAF officer, born 1931) =

Royal Air Force Air Vice-Marshal (1931-2014)

Air Vice-Marshal Sir Richard Peirse KCVO CB
- Born: 16 March 1931; Blackheath, London, England
- Died: 8 February 2014 (aged 82)
- Relatives: Air Chief Marshal Sir Richard Peirse (father); Admiral Sir Richard Peirse (grandfather)
- Military career
- Allegiance: United Kingdom
- Branch: Royal Air Force
- Service years: 1952–88
- Rank: Air Vice-Marshal
- Commands: Royal Air Force College Cranwell (1982–85); RAF Waddington (1973–76); No. 51 Squadron (1968–69)
- Awards: Knight Commander of the Royal Victorian Order; Companion of the Order of the Bath
- Other work: Gentleman Usher of the Scarlet Rod; Registrar and Secretary of the Order of the Bath

Air Vice-Marshal Sir Richard Charles Fairfax Peirse, KCVO, CB (16 March 1931 – 8 February 2014) was a senior Royal Air Force officer who served as Defence Services Secretary from 1985 to 1988.

== Early life ==
Peirse was born on 16 March 1931, the son of Air Chief Marshal Sir Richard Peirse. He was educated at Bradfield College.

== Military career ==
He attended the Royal Air Force College Cranwell. Commissioned a pilot officer in the RAF on 9 April 1952, he was promoted to flying officer on 9 April 1953 and to flight lieutenant on 9 October 1954. He was promoted to squadron leader on 1 July 1959 and to wing commander on 1 July 1965.

Peirse became Commanding Officer of No. 51 Squadron in 1968. Promoted to group captain on 1 July 1969, he became Deputy Captain of the Queen's Flight that year. He was Station Commander at RAF Waddington in 1973 and deputy director of Operational Requirements in 1976, and Director of Personnel (Air) in 1977. Promoted to air commodore on 1 January 1978, he became Director of Operational Requirements in 1980.

On 30 January 1982, Air Commodore Peirse was appointed Commandant of the Royal Air Force College Cranwell, with the acting rank of air vice-marshal. He was promoted to substantive air vice-marshal on 6 July. Appointed a Companion of the Order of the Bath in the 1984 New Year Honours List, he served as Defence Services Secretary from 1985 to his retirement. On 9 March 1988 Peirse was appointed a Knight Commander of the Royal Victorian Order, and retired from the RAF on 16 June.

== Later life ==
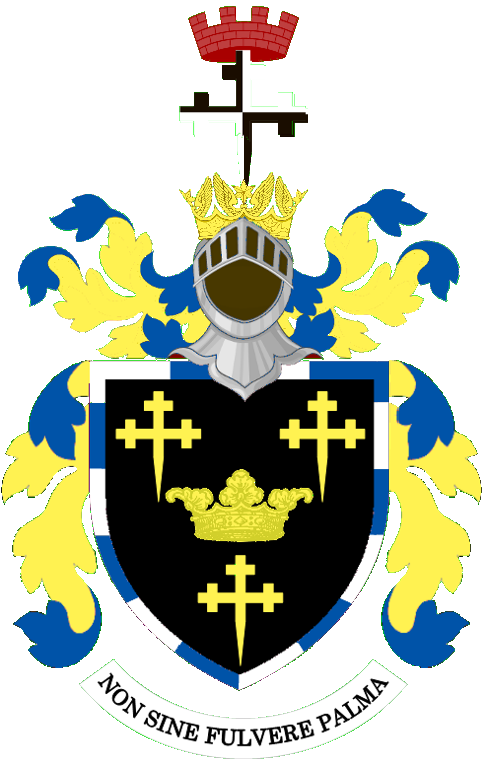
Peirse's coat of arms is displayed on a stallplate at Westminster Abbey.

In retirement, he was Gentleman Usher of the Scarlet Rod between 1990 and 2002 and Registrar and Secretary of the Order of the Bath between 2002 and 2006.

== Personal life ==
In 1955 Peirse married Karalie Grace Cox; they had two daughters, Amanda and Susan. After his first marriage was dissolved, he married Deirdre Mary O'Donovan in 1963; they had one son, who died (Richard b. 1965). Following the death of his second wife he married Anna Jill Margaret Long (née Latey) in 1977.

Military offices
Preceded by Sir Michael Palmer	Defence Services Secretary; 1985–1988	Succeeded by Sir David Allen
