= Simon Brooks-Ward =

British Army Reserve officer and events organiser

Major General Simon Brooks-Ward CVO CBE TD VR
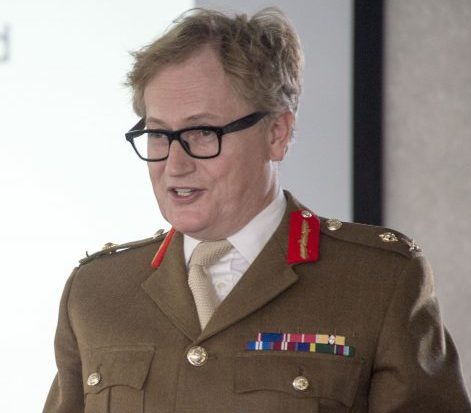
- Military career
- Allegiance: United Kingdom
- Branch: British Army
- Service years: 1987–2022
- Rank: Major General
- Commands: Royal Yeomanry
- Conflicts: Iraq War
- Awards: Commander of the Royal Victorian Order; Commander of the Order of the British Empire; Territorial Decoration; Volunteer Reserves Service Medal

Major General Simon Howe Brooks-Ward, CVO, CBE, TD, VR is a British event organiser and former senior Army Reserve officer. Through his company, The HPower Group, he is most well known for organising large-scale equestrian events worldwide.

== Military career ==
Brooks-Ward was commissioned into the Royal Yeomanry on 4 October 1987. He served in the Iraq War as the Commanding Officer of the Royal Yeomanry, the only Army Reserve unit to receive a battle honour during the conflict. In 2004 he was awarded the Territorial Decoration, and in 2005 he was appointed Officer of the Order of the British Empire (OBE) for services in Iraq and to defence. He was subsequently Colonel Yeomanry at Headquarters Royal Armoured Corps and Colonel TA Training at the Royal Military Academy Sandhurst. In January 2012 he was promoted to brigadier and was appointed Assistant Divisional Commander of 3rd (United Kingdom) Division in Bulford. In October 2015 he was promoted to major general and took over as Deputy Commander Field Army, the most senior position in the Army Reserve. He retired in June 2022.

He was appointed Colonel Commandant of the Yeomanry Royal Armoured Corps Army Reserve on 1 January 2024.

Brooks-Ward was appointed Commander of the Order of the British Empire (CBE) in the 2022 New Year Honours.

== Event organiser ==
Brooks-Ward arranged his first major event at the age of 27, directing the Luciano Pavarotti horse show in Italy. He has subsequently become the director of the Olympia London International Horse Show and the Royal Windsor Horse Show, as well as numerous other major equestrian events.

In addition, Brooks-Ward was the Equestrian Adviser at the 2004 Summer Olympics opening ceremony, and the site selection and feasibility plans for London 2012, the 2008 TA100 National Pageant, the Windsor Castle Royal Tattoo, the 2012 Diamond Jubilee Pageant, and the BAFTA Award Winning Queen's 90th Birthday Celebrations at Windsor. The HPower Group was the delivery company for the three First World War 100 year anniversary commemorations; 2015 at St Symphorien Cemetery, Mons, 2016 Somme, and 2017 Passchendaele commemorations. His involvement in many British state ceremonial occasions led to him being honoured as a Lieutenant of the Royal Victorian Order in 2002. He was promoted to Commander in the same order in the 2012 Diamond Jubilee Honours in recognition of his services during the Diamond Jubilee of Elizabeth II.

Brooks-Ward was involved in organising national celebrations for the Queen's 90th birthday in May 2016.

Military offices
Preceded by Ranald Munro	Deputy Commander Field Army (Reserves); 2015–2018	Succeeded by William O'Leary
