= Eldon Millar =

British Army general

Lieutenant General Eldon Millar CVO MBE
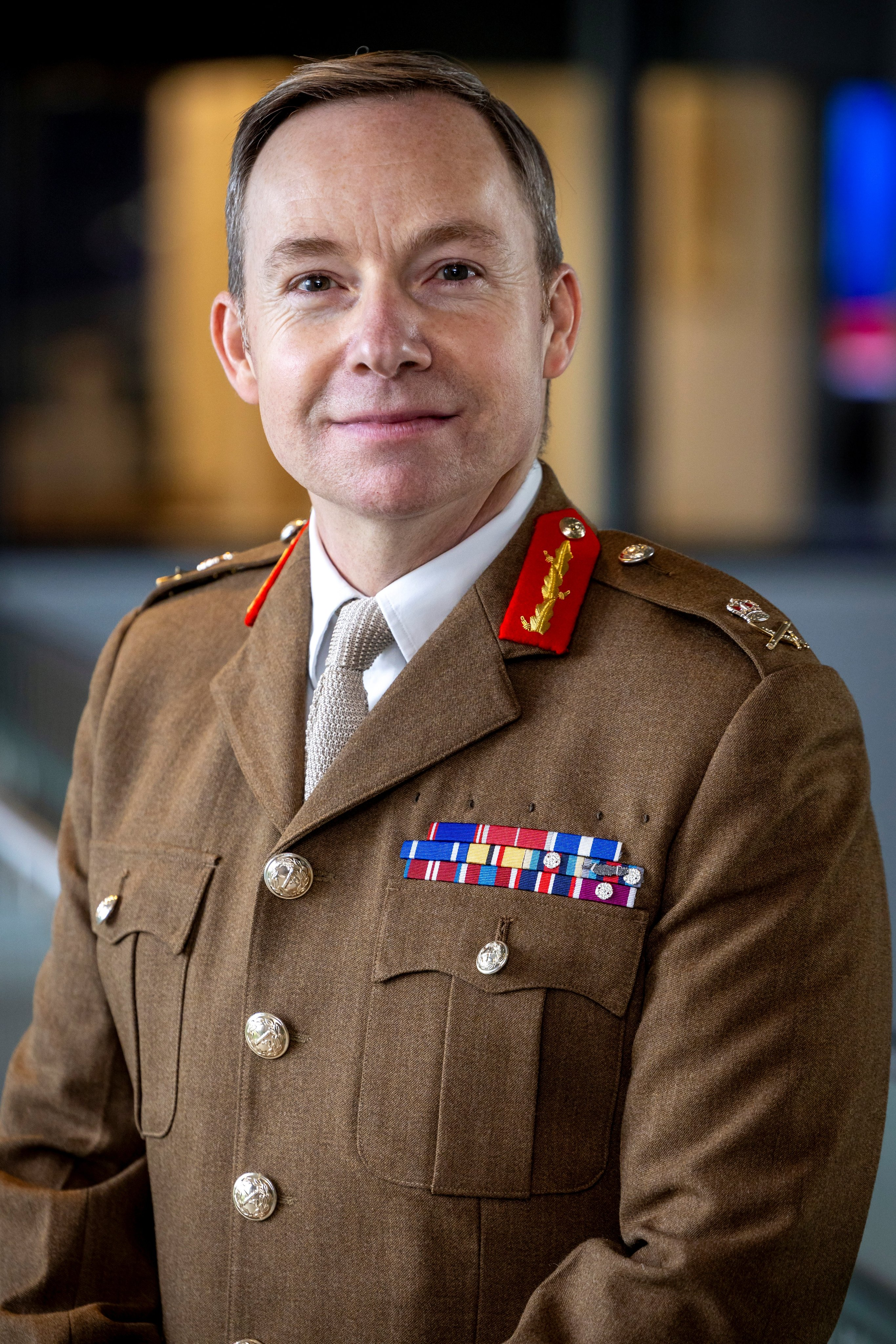
- Born: Eldon Nicholas Somerville Millar
- Military career
- Allegiance: United Kingdom
- Branch: British Army
- Service years: 1994–present
- Rank: Lieutenant General
- Commands: Defence Services Secretary; 33 Engineer Regiment (EOD)
- Conflicts: Iraq War; War in Afghanistan; Military intervention against ISIL
- Awards: Commander of the Royal Victorian Order; Member of the Order of the British Empire; Queen's Commendation for Valuable Service

Lieutenant General Eldon Nicholas Somerville Millar CVO MBE is a British Army officer who since January 2026 has served as UK National Military Representative to NATO and UK National Military Representative to the EU. He was previously deputy commander, NATO Rapid Deployable Corps – Italy, and served as Defence Services Secretary in the Royal Household from 2022 to 2024.

== Military career ==
Millar was commissioned the Royal Engineers on 14 October 1994. After serving as commanding officer of 33 Engineer Regiment (EOD), he became head of Army Engagement and Communications in October 2019 and Defence Services Secretary in 2022. From 2024 to 2025 he was deputy commander, NATO Rapid Deployable Corps – Italy, and from 12 January 2026 he is UK National Military Representative to NATO (and subsequently UK National Military Representative to the EU) with the promotion to lieutenant-general.

Millar was appointed Honorary Colonel of the Engineer and Logistic Staff Corps Army Reserve on 6 April 2026.

He was appointed Member of the Order of the British Empire in March 2010 and received the Queen's Commendation for Valuable Service in March 2016. He was appointed Commander of the Royal Victorian Order (CVO) in September 2024 upon relinquishing his role as Defence Services Secretary.

Military offices
Preceded by James Macleod	Defence Services Secretary; 2022–2024	Succeeded by Lisa Keetley
Preceded by Sir Ian Cave	UK Military Representative to NATO; 2026–present	Incumbent
