= Michael Palmer (British Army officer) =

British Army officer (1928–2017)

Major-General Sir Michael Palmer KCVO
- Born: Joseph Michael Palmer; 17 October 1928
- Died: 21 February 2017 (aged 88)
- Military career
- Allegiance: United Kingdom
- Branch: British Army
- Service years: 1948–1985
- Rank: Major-General
- Service number: 400011
- Commands: 14th/20th King's Hussars; Royal Armoured Corps
- Awards: Knight Commander of the Royal Victorian Order

Major-General Sir Joseph Michael Palmer, KCVO (17 October 1928 – 21 February 2017) was a senior British Army officer. He was Defence Services Secretary from 1982 to 1985.

== Early life ==
Born on 17 October 1928, Palmer was the son of Lieutenant-Colonel William Robert Palmer, DSO and his wife Joan Audrey Palmer (née Smith). He was educated at Sandroyd School in Surrey, where he was head boy in 1937, and then in Wiltshire, following the school's move in 1939. After Sandroyd, Palmer attended Wellington College at Crowthorne in Berkshire.

== Military career ==
Having attended the Royal Military Academy, Sandhurst, Palmer was commissioned into the 14th/20th King's Hussars as a second lieutenant on 22 December 1948, with seniority from that date. He was given the service number 400011. Promoted to lieutenant on 22 December 1950, he was Adjutant of the 14th/20th King's Hussars from 1953 to 1955, and was given the acting rank of captain on appointment. Promoted to captain on 22 December 1954, he served as Adjutant of the Duke of Lancaster's Own Yeomanry from 1956 to 1959.

He attended Staff College, Camberley in 1960 and, having been promoted to major on 22 December 1961, he attended the Joint Services Staff College in 1965. He was promoted to lieutenant colonel on 30 June 1969 and between 1969 and 1972 he was commanding officer of the 14th/20th King's Hussars. He was promoted to colonel on 30 June 1973. He went on to be Commander Royal Armoured Corps at Headquarters 1st (British) Corps in 1974 and, having been promoted to brigadier on 31 December 1974, he became Assistant Chief of Staff at Allied Forces Central Europe in 1976. He became Director Royal Armoured Corps on 8 December 1978 and was promoted to major-general on 19 February 1980. He was Defence Services Secretary from 1982 to 1985, when he retired. On 21 March 1985, Palmer was appointed Knight Commander of the Royal Victorian Order (KCVO).

Palmer was appointed Honorary Colonel of his old regiment, the 14th/20th King's Hussars on 15 February 1981.

== Personal life ==
Michael and his wife Jillean (Jilly) Monica Palmer (née Sherston) have three children, Jeremy (married to artist and journalist Angela Palmer), Deborah and Jonathan (who was also Adjutant of the 14/20th King’s Hussars). In 1989 he became Master of the Worshipful Company of Salters.

He died on 21 February 2017 at the age of 88.

Military offices
Preceded by Sir Leslie Townsend	Defence Services Secretary; 1982–1985	Succeeded by Sir Richard Peirse
