= Anthony Palmer (British Army officer) =

Soldier

Lieutenant General Anthony Palmer CB CBE
- Born: 13 March 1949 (age 77)
- Military career
- Allegiance: United Kingdom
- Branch: British Army
- Service years: 1970-2005
- Rank: Lieutenant General
- Commands: 2nd Bn Royal Green Jackets; 8th Infantry Brigade
- Conflicts: The Troubles
- Awards: Companion of the Order of the Bath; Commander of the Order of the British Empire

Lieutenant General Anthony Malcolm Douglas Palmer CB CBE (born 13 March 1949) is a retired British Army officer. He was Deputy Chief of the Defence Staff (Personnel) from 2002 to 2005.

== Career ==
Educated at Winchester College, Palmer was commissioned into the Royal Green Jackets in 1970 and served in Northern Ireland during the Troubles. He became Commanding Officer of 2nd Bn Royal Green Jackets in 1988, Commander of 8th Infantry Brigade in 1992 and Director of Army Plans at the Ministry of Defence in 1996. He went on to be Director-General of Army Training and Recruiting in 1999, Deputy Commander (Operations) of the Stabilisation Force in Bosnia in 2002 and Deputy Chief of the Defence Staff (Personnel) in 2002 before retiring in 2005.

In retirement he became Chairman of the Pakistan Society. He has also organised a summer adventure camp for black youths in conjunction with the Commission for Racial Equality, introduced gender-fair training for women in the army after it was found that a policy of equal treatment resulted in a high level of injuries for female recruits and launched Project Compass to help ex-service homeless find employment.

He was awarded CB in the New Years Honours, 2005.

His cousin is the British politician Nick Palmer.

Military offices
Preceded by Sir Malcolm Pledger	Deputy Chief of the Defence Staff (Personnel); 2002–2005	Succeeded by David Pocock
