= Christopher Haslett Elliott =

British Army general

Major General Christopher Elliott CVO CBE
- Born: 26 May 1947 (age 79)
- Military career
- Allegiance: United Kingdom
- Branch: British Army
- Service years: 1966–2004
- Rank: Major-General
- Commands: 1st Bn Royal Regiment of Wales; British Forces in Belize; UK Support Command (Germany)
- Conflicts: The Troubles
- Awards: Commander of the Royal Victorian Order; Commander of the Order of the British Empire

Major General Christopher Haslett Elliott CVO CBE (born 26 May 1947) is a former senior British Army officer who served as Defence Services Secretary from 2001 to 2004.

== Military career ==
Educated at Kelly College in Tavistock and Mons Officer Cadet School, Elliot was commissioned into the South Wales Borderers in 1966. He saw service in Northern Ireland and was mentioned in despatches in 1975. He became Commanding Officer of 1st Bn Royal Regiment of Wales in 1987. He went on to be Commander of British Forces in Belize in 1990, Director of Army Recruiting at the Ministry of Defence in 1993 and British Military Advisor in South Africa in 1994. After that he became General Officer Commanding UK Support Command (Germany) in 1997 and then served as Defence Services Secretary and Director General, Reserve Forces and Cadets from 2001 to 2004.

In retirement he became Director of the Army Sport Control Board.

== Family ==
In 1970 he married Annabel Melanie Emerson; they have four daughters.

Military offices
| Preceded by Christopher Drewry | GOC United Kingdom Support Command (Germany); 1997–2001 | Succeeded by John Moore-Bick |
| Preceded by Rodney Lees | Defence Services Secretary; 2001–2004 | Succeeded by David Pocock |
