= Defence Services Secretary =

Defence Services Secretary / Assistant Chief of Defence Staff (Personnel Capability)
- Arms of the Royal Household

- Flag of the British Armed Forces
- Incumbent; Major General Lisa Keetley since October 2024
- British Armed Forces; Royal Household
- Abbreviation: DSS
- Reports to: The Monarch; Secretary of State for Defence; Chief of Defence Staff
- Nominator: Secretary of State for Defence
- Appointer: The Monarch
- Formation: 1964
- First holder: General Sir Rodney Moore

The Defence Services Secretary is a senior member of the Royal Household of the Sovereign of the United Kingdom.

== Responsibilities ==
The Defence Services Secretary is the senior member of the Royal Household responsible for liaison between the Sovereign and the British Armed Forces. They are answerable to the Secretary of State for Defence and the Chief of Defence Staff for tri-service appointments, national ceremonial events and honours, decorations, awards and medals. From 1992 the Defence Services Secretary has been double-hatted with a second Ministry of Defence role, generally that of Assistant Chief of Defence Staff (Personnel).

== List of Defence Services Secretaries ==
Defence Services Secretaries have been:

- General Sir Rodney Moore, KCB, KCVO, CBE, DSO 1964–1966
- Vice Admiral Sir Ian Hogg, KCVO, CB, DSC 1966–1967
- Air Vice-Marshal Sir Alan Boxer, KCVO, CB, DSO, DFC 1967–1970
- Major General Sir Chandos Blair, KCVO, OBE, MC 1970–1972
- Rear Admiral Sir Ronald Forrest, KCVO 1972–1975
- Air Vice-Marshal Sir Brian Stanbridge, KCVO, CBE, AFC 1975–1979
- Rear Admiral Sir Leslie Townsend, KCVO, CBE 1979–1982
- Major General Sir Michael Palmer, KCVO 1982–1985
- Air Vice-Marshal Sir Richard Peirse, KCVO, CB 1985–1988
- Rear Admiral Sir David Allen, KCVO, CBE 1988–1991
- Major General Brian Pennicott, CVO 1991–1994 (Assistant Chief of Defence Staff (Personnel and Reserves) from 1992)
- Air Vice-Marshal Peter Harding, CB, CVO, CBE, AFC 1994–1998
- Rear Admiral Rodney Lees, CVO 1998–2001 (Assistant Chief of Defence Staff (Personnel and Reserves) as secondary post)
- Major General Christopher Elliot, CVO, CBE 2001–2004 (Director General, Reserve Forces and Cadets as secondary post)
- Air Vice-Marshal David Pocock, CVO 2004–2005 (Assistant Chief of Defence Staff (Personnel and Reserves) as secondary post)
- Rear Admiral Peter Wilkinson, CVO 2005–2007 (Assistant Chief of Defence Staff (Personnel and Reserves) as secondary post)
- Major General Matthew Sykes, CVO 2007–2010
- Air Vice-Marshal David Murray, CVO, OBE 2010–2012
- Rear Admiral Simon Williams, CVO 2012–2015 (Assistant Chief of Defence Staff (Personnel and Reserves) as secondary post)
- Major-General Richard Nugee, CVO, CBE 2015–2016 (Assistant Chief of Defence Staff (Personnel and Reserves) as secondary post)
- Air Vice-Marshal Garry Tunnicliffe, CVO 2016–2019 (Assistant Chief of the Defence Staff (Personnel Capability) as secondary post)
- Rear Admiral James Macleod, CB, CVO 2019-2022 (Assistant Chief of the Defence Staff (Personnel Capability) as secondary post)
- Major General Eldon Millar, CVO, MBE 2022–2024 (Assistant Chief of Defence Staff (People Capability) as secondary post)
- Major General Lisa Keetley 2024–present (Assistant Chief of Defence Staff (People Capability) as secondary post)
