= David Allen (Royal Navy officer) =

Rear Admiral Sir David Allen KCVO CBE
- Born: 14 June 1933
- Died: 13 January 1995 (aged 61)
- Military career
- Allegiance: United Kingdom
- Branch: Royal Navy
- Service years: 1949-1991
- Rank: Rear Admiral
- Awards: Knight Commander of the Royal Victorian Order; Commander of the Order of the British Empire

Rear Admiral Sir David Allen KCVO CBE (14 June 1933 – 13 January 1995) was a senior Royal Navy officer who served as Defence Services Secretary from 1988 to 1991.

== Naval career ==
Educated at Hutchesons' Grammar School in Glasgow and the Royal Naval College, Dartmouth, Allen joined the Royal Navy in 1949. He became secretary to the Naval Secretary in 1973, Fleet Supply Officer in 1975 and secretary to the Controller of the Navy in 1978. He joined the staff of the Flag Officer, Naval Air Command in 1981 and became secretary to the First Sea Lord in 1982 before becoming commanding officer of HMS Cochrane in 1985. He was Chief Naval Supply and Secretariat Officer as well as Defence Services Secretary from 1988 to 1991 when he retired.

== Personal life and death ==
In 1962 he married Margaret Gwendolin Todd; they had two sons.

Allen died on 13 January 1995, at the age of 61.

Military offices
Preceded by Sir Richard Peirse	Defence Services Secretary; 1988–1991	Succeeded by Sir Brian Pennicott
