= Lisa Keetley =

British Army general

Major General Lisa Keetley
- Born: Lisa Claire Keetley
- Military career
- Allegiance: United Kingdom
- Branch: British Army
- Service years: 1995–present
- Rank: Major General
- Commands: Defence Services Secretary
- Conflicts: Iraq War; War in Afghanistan

Major General Lisa Claire Keetley is a British Army officer who has served as Defence Services Secretary in the Royal Household since 2024.

== Military career ==
Having attended the Royal Military Academy Sandhurst, Keetley was commissioned into the Royal Electrical and Mechanical Engineers on 16 December 1995.

Promoted to brigadier on 31 December 2019, she became Deputy Chief of Staff at the NATO Rapid Deployable Corps – Spain in 2019, Deputy Commanding General for Support at the Security Assistance Group in Ukraine in 2022 and Assistant Chief of the Defence Staff (People Capability) and the Defence Services Secretary in 2024.

In 2026 she was appointed to the board of the Imperial War Museum.

Military offices
Preceded by Eldon Millar	Defence Services Secretary; 2024–present	Incumbent
