= Jack Deverell =

British Army general (born 1945)

General Sir Jack Deverell KCB OBE DL FRSA
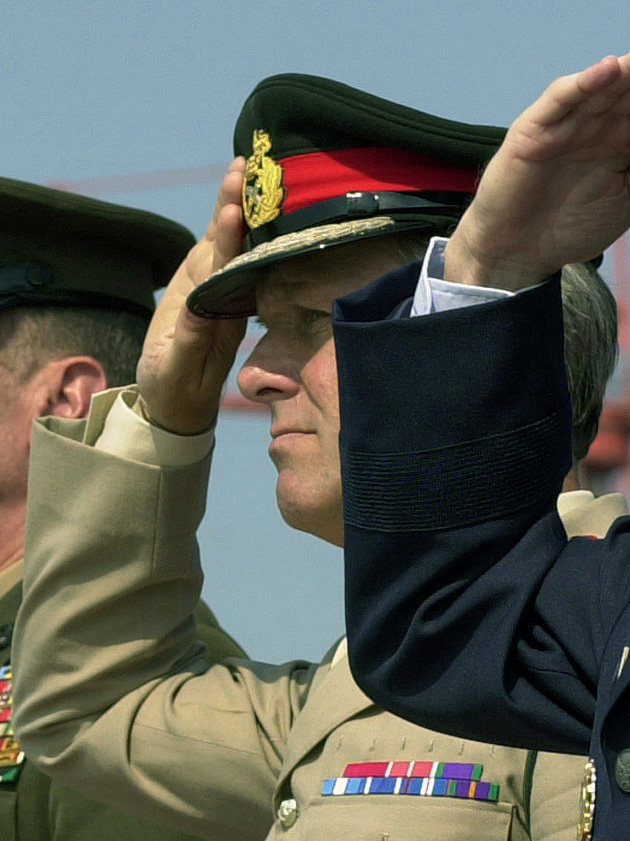
- Deverell, 12 August 2003
- Born: John Freeguard Deverell; 27 April 1945 (age 81); Birmingham, England
- Military career
- Allegiance: United Kingdom
- Branch: British Army
- Service years: 1965–2004
- Rank: General
- Service number: 480284
- Units: Somerset and Cornwall Light Infantry; The Light Infantry
- Commands: 3rd Battalion, The Light Infantry; UK Mobile Force; Royal Military Academy Sandhurst; Allied Forces Northern Europe
- Conflicts: Operation Banner; Bosnian War
- Awards: Knight Commander of the Order of the Bath; Officer of the Order of the British Empire

General Sir John Freeguard Deverell KCB OBE DL FRSA (born 27 April 1945) is a British Army officer who was Commander-in-Chief Allied Forces Northern Europe from 2001 to 2004.

== Military career ==
Deverell was born in Birmingham, the son of Harold James Frank Deverell and Joan Beatrice Carter. Educated at King Edward's School, Bath and the Royal Military Academy Sandhurst, Deverell was commissioned into the Somerset and Cornwall Light Infantry in 1966. He was selected as commanding officer of 3rd Bn The Light Infantry in 1984, serving in the UK including in Northern Ireland, before moving on to be Director of Staff at Royal Military College of Science in 1986. He became Commander of the UK Mobile Force in 1988.

In 1991, he took the post of Director of Army Recruiting, followed, in 1993, by the post of Director-General of Army Manning and Recruiting at the Ministry of Defence. In 1995 he became Commandant of the Royal Military Academy Sandhurst.

He was made Deputy Commander-in-Chief Land Command and Inspector General of the Territorial Army in 1997 and deployed as Deputy Commander for Operations of the Stabilisation Force in Bosnia and Herzegovina in November 1998, after which he returned to his role as Deputy Commander-in-Chief in March 1999. His final appointment was as Commander-in-Chief Allied Forces Northern Europe in 2001; he retired in 2004.

== Personal life ==
In 1973, he married Jane Ellen Solomon: they have one son and one daughter.

In retirement he became Chairman of the National Army Museum. He was appointed a Deputy Lieutenant of Wiltshire in 2015.

Military offices
Preceded by Hew Pike	Commandant of the Royal Military Academy Sandhurst; 1995–1997	Succeeded by Arthur Denaro
Preceded by Sir Hew Pike	Deputy Commander-in-Chief Land Command; 1997–2001	Succeeded by Sir Cedric Delves
