= Christopher Drewry =

British Army general (1947–2024)

Lieutenant General Sir Christopher Drewry KCB CBE
- Born: 25 June 1947; Derbyshire, England
- Died: 4 November 2024 (aged 77)
- Military career
- Allegiance: United Kingdom
- Branch: British Army
- Service years: 1969–2003
- Rank: Lieutenant General
- Unit: Welsh Guards
- Commands: Allied Rapid Reaction Corps (2000–2002); UK Support Command (Germany) (1995–1997)
- Conflicts: The Troubles; Operation Banner
- Awards: Knight Commander of the Order of the Bath; Commander of the Order of the British Empire; Mentioned in Despatches

Lieutenant General Sir Christopher Francis Drewry KCB CBE (25 June 1947 – 4 November 2024) was a senior officer of the British Army who served as commander of the Allied Rapid Reaction Corps from 2000 to 2002.

== Early life ==
Drewry was born in Derbyshire on 25 June 1947. He attended Malvern College in Worcestershire.

== Military career ==
Drewry was commissioned into the Welsh Guards in 1969. He was mentioned in despatches during a tour in Northern Ireland in 1987, and appointed a Commander of the Order of the British Empire in the 1990 Birthday Honours.

In 1996 Drewry was appointed General Officer Commanding UK Support Command (Germany) and in 1997 he moved on to be Assistant Chief of Defence Staff for Policy at the Ministry of Defence. He was knighted as a Knight Commander of the Order of the Bath in the 2000 Birthday Honours, and appointed commander of the Allied Rapid Reaction Corps later that year. He retired in 2003.

== Death ==
Drewry died from cancer on 4 November 2024, at the age of 77.

Military offices
Preceded by Scott Grant	GOC United Kingdom Support Command (Germany); 1995–1997	Succeeded by Christopher Elliott
Preceded by Sir Mike Jackson	Commander Allied Rapid Reaction Corps; 2000–2002	Succeeded by Sir Richard Dannatt
