= John Gower (British naval officer) =

British naval officer

Rear Admiral John Gower CB OBE
- Born: 28 July 1960; Carshalton, England
- Died: 12 February 2024 (aged 63)
- Education: University of Salford
- Spouse: Diana Steven
- Military career
- Allegiance: United Kingdom
- Branch: Royal Navy
- Service years: 1978 - 2014
- Rank: Rear Admiral
- Commands: HMS Trafalgar (S107); HMS Unicorn (S43)

Rear Admiral John Howard James Gower CB OBE (28 July 1960 – 12 February 2024) was a British Royal Navy officer. He served as the Assistant Chief of the Defence Staff (Nuclear & Chemical, Biological) in the Ministry of Defence until his retirement in 2014.

== Early life ==
Gower was born in 1960 to Howard Gower and his wife Josephine (maiden name, Smart) in Carshalton, Surrey and moved to Solihull when he was four years old. His father died in a holiday seaside accident in 1969. Josephine remarried Tim Adkin who was a teacher at Solihull School and headed a Royal Air Force section of the school's Combined Cadet Force. Barred early on from becoming a fighter pilot due to poor eyesight, John was subsequently persuaded to join the Britannia Royal Naval College, Dartmouth in 1978. By deferring his naval cadetship, Gower took the time to earn a degree in electrical engineering from Salford University.

== Royal Navy career ==
John entered the Navy in 1978 and earned the rank of Sub Lieutenant in 1980 and Lieutenant in 1983. He steadily rose up the naval ranks and was promoted from Lieutenant Commander to Commander in 1994. In 1995 he took command of the HMS Trafalgar. In 1998 he received the O.B.E honorific recognition, "To be Ordinary Officers of the Military Division of the said Most Excellent Order," bestowed by the Crown. Gower's continued upward movement commanding naval vessels was forestalled by an incident of having grounded the HMS Trafalgar off the coast of Scotland, which rendered him ineligible for commanding a larger vessel.

Subsequently, he took administrative posts on land. These included the Naval Staff's Assistant Director of Nuclear Deterrence, and he served at the British Embassy in Washington as a naval attaché. He also served at Shrivenham on the Advanced Command and Staff course as the Director for Underwater Capability. He was promoted from Commander to Captain in 2000. He achieved the prestigious rank of Rear Admiral in his promotion from Commodore to Rear Admiral in 2011.

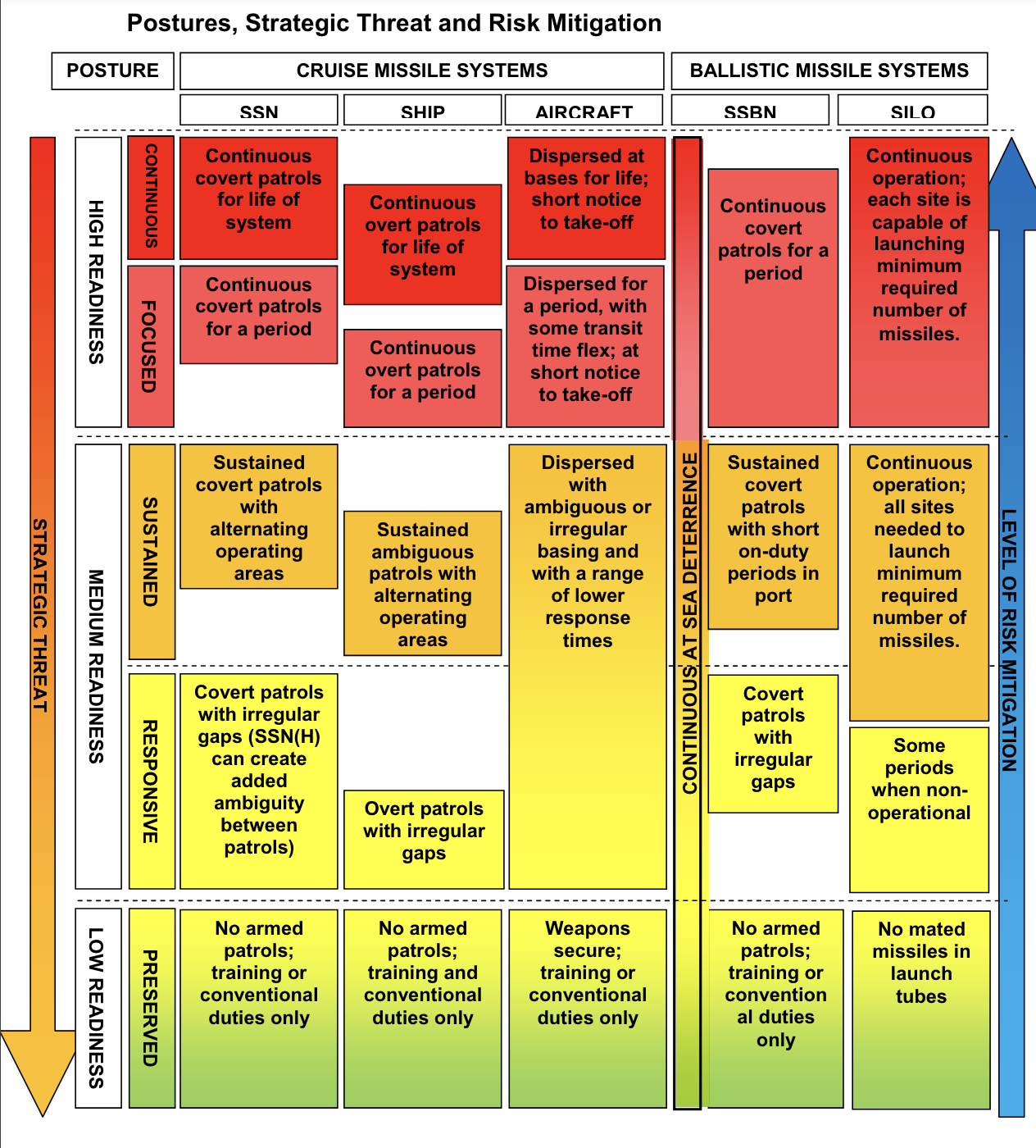
The vectorial diagram by Gower demonstrating nuclear deterrence responses at different alertness levels and the correlated effects of threat mitigations.

Gower's final professional naval post as Rear Admiral, in 2011–14, was to serve as Former Assistant Chief of Defence Staff (Nuclear, Chemical, Biological) in the United Kingdom Ministry of Defence. In that role, Gower presided over the 2013 publication of the HM Government Trident Alternatives Review. Having commanded nuclear-armed submarines, Gower was attentive to these weapons systems' role in the United Kingdom, as well as in NATO's strategic defenses. This report analyzes the role and credibility of nuclear deterrence and contrasts the effectiveness of various nuclear weapons systems. Examining the topic of "credibility and constraints," the document puts forward clear statements about the nature of the UK's nuclear doctrine, deterrence credibility, extended and collective deterrence relevant to NATO, and legal constraints. The report delivers a detailed analysis of various nuclear warhead delivery platforms from large aircraft and submarines to mobile ballistic missile launchers. It also compares different types of warheads from free fall bombs and cruise missile bombs to the UK Trident bomb. It assesses several nuclear deterrence postures and credibility criteria, and considers the vulnerability of second strike forces. The Report concludes with a diagrammatic figure contrasting nuclear deterrence attributes of cruise and ballistic missiles, showing how as the perception of the threat of attack rises, the risks of attack are mitigated by increasing the readiness of deterrent forces.

== Retirement ==
After retiring from his active role in the Royal Navy, John Gower published numerous articles in strategic outlets that address nuclear deterrence and existential risk mitigation. He published with the Bulletin of the Atomic Scientists, BASIC, the Council on Strategic Risks, the Nautilus Institute, and the Carnegie Endowment. He gave public lectures, such as a Fireside Chat with the Centre for Effective Altruism, and a participated in panel discussions, including on nuclear risk.

Gower supported a Code of Nuclear Responsibility that outlined 10 commitments to ensuring the stability of nuclear deterrence. These tenets entail: restraint, relevance, reassurance, readiness, reciprocity, and reduction. He also cautioned against the nuclear warfighting posture of nuclear deterrence, which is the status quo for the United States. In his article, "The Dangerous Illogic of Twenty-First-Century Deterrence Through Planning for Nuclear Warfighting," he critiques the United States Nuclear Posture Review's strategic posture of countering nonnuclear attacks with nuclear retaliation, and provides an alternative path. Gower assessed the UK's nuclear command and control systems.

== Personal life ==
Gower married Diana Steven, daughter of a Naval Officer, in 1986. They met when both joined the University Officers' Training Corps. The couple had two sons and a daughter. Gower's hobbies included poetry writing, cycling, and motorcycling. He is remembered for having cycled to formal dinners in London dressed in full senior officer's attire. John Gower's lifetime contributions and achievements have been acknowledged by the European Leadership Network, the Australian Naval Institute, the Council on Strategic Risks, as well as the Times.
