= King's Volunteer Reserves Medal =

- Obverse and reverse of the medal
- Awarded for: Exemplary personal performance over an extended period of service in the Reserve Forces.
- Country: United Kingdom
- Presented by: The Monarch
- Eligibility: Members of the • Army Reserve • Royal Auxiliary Air Force • Royal Naval Reserve • Royal Marines Reserve
- Post-nominals: KVRM
- Clasps: None
- Established: 29 March 1999
- Ribbon of KVRM

Order of Wear
- Next (higher): King's Ambulance Service Medal
- Next (lower): Queen's Medal for Chiefs (de jure); British campaign medals, United Nations Medals, and Medals of recognised International Organisations in order of award (de facto)

The King's Volunteer Reserves Medal (KVRM), originally the Queen's Volunteer Reserves Medal (QVRM), was created by Royal Warrant of Queen Elizabeth II on 29 March 1999. In 2022 the award was renamed The King’s Volunteer Reserves Medal (KVRM) and the first KVRM recipients were included in the New Year Honours List 2023.

Only 13 medals may be awarded in a year (although more have been issued in 12 out of the medal's 27-year history as of 2025). The medal is presented only to members of the Volunteer Reserves of the British Armed Services for exemplary meritorious service in the conduct of their duties. The KVRM is a Level 3 award and ranks in military order of wear immediately after the British Empire Medal. It is the first exclusive award to Volunteer Reserves that is presented at an investiture. The first awards were announced in the 1999 Queen's Birthday Honours with these first awards presented at an investiture on 5 November 1999.

Awards are announced in The Gazette.

== Medal ==
The medal is circular and made of silver coloured metal. The obverse of the QVRM bears the sovereign's effigy surrounded by the inscription ELIZABETH II DEI GRATIA REGINA FID DEF (Latin: Elizabeth II by the Grace of God, Queen, Defender of the Faith). The reverse depicts a scroll with the inscription The Queen's Volunteer Reserves Medal. The ribbon is dark green with three narrow gold stripes. Receipt of this medal is entitles the holder to use the post-nominals KVRM or QVRM (depending on the monarch by whom the award was made). There are no clasps awarded for this medal.

== See also ==
- Orders, decorations, and medals of the Commonwealth realms
- Awards and decorations of the British Armed Forces
- KVRM Association Website
