= Volunteer Reserves Service Medal =

Medal in the British Armed Forces

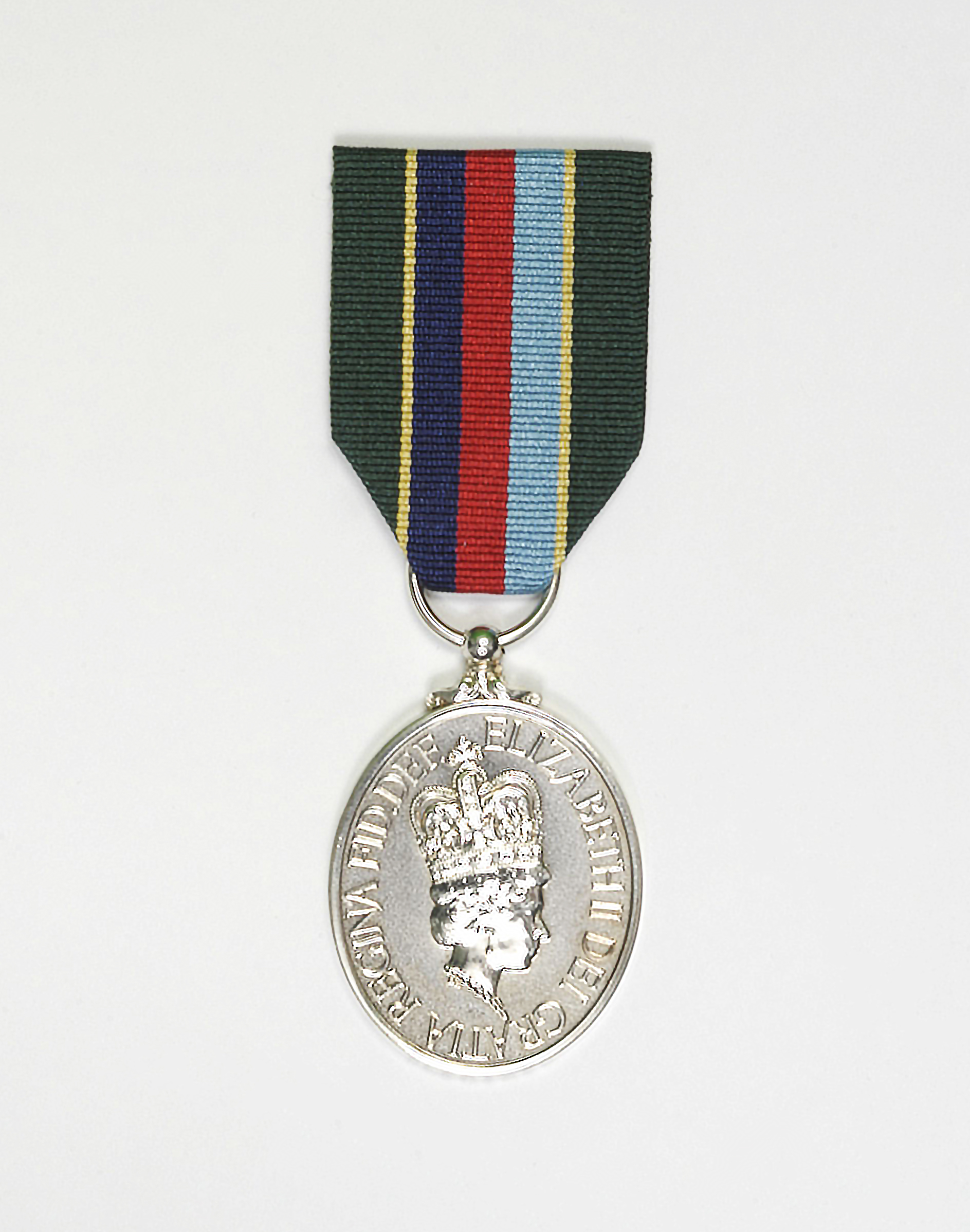
- Obverse of the medal
- Type: Long service medal
- Awarded for: 10 years' qualifying service
- Presented by: United Kingdom
- Eligibility: All members of the Reserves of all of the branches of the British Armed Forces
- Clasps: for each additional 5 years service
- Established: 1 April 1999
- Standard ribbon bar Honourable Artillery Company ribbon

Order of Wear
- Next (higher): Air Efficiency Award
- Next (lower): Ulster Defence Regiment Medal
- Related: Reserve Decoration, Reserve Long Service and Good Conduct Medal, Territorial Decoration, Efficiency Medal (Territorial), Air Efficiency Award

The Volunteer Reserves Service Medal (VRSM) is a medal which may be awarded to members of all military reserve forces of the British Armed Forces, specifically the Royal Naval Reserve, Royal Marines Reserve, Army Reserve and Royal Auxiliary Air Force. Created on 1 April 1999, the medal replaced the decorations and medals awarded to reservists in different branches of the British military, including the Royal Navy's Reserve Decoration and Reserve Long Service and Good Conduct Medal, the British Army's Territorial Decoration and Efficiency Medal, and the Royal Air Force's Air Efficiency Award.

== Description ==
The medal is a silver oval, 38mm high and 32mm wide. The obverse depicts an image of the monarch. The reverse has the words, in five lines, FOR SERVICE IN THE VOLUNTEER RESERVES, above a sprig of oak leaves and acorns. The medal is suspended from a ribbon that represents each of the services with narrow stripes of dark blue, scarlet and light blue in the centre (for the Navy, Army and Air Force, respectively) separated by a thin strip of yellow from dark green bands (representing the Reserves) at each edge. Members of the Honourable Artillery Company receive the same medal but with their ribbon.

== Criteria ==
The VRSM is awarded after 10 years of qualifying service in the Volunteer Reserves, although service in the Regular forces before joining the Reserves may count towards the qualifying period. However, a maximum of five years of regular service can be counted and this service is counted as half qualifying time. A clasp is awarded for each additional 5 years service.

== "VR" post-nominal letters ==
It was announced on 26 March 2015 by the Secretary of State for Defence, Michael Fallon, that Volunteer Reservists may use the post-nominal letters "VR" after 10 years' service, back-dated to 1999. As the post-nominal recognition is available after a straight 10 years' service, reservists may find themselves entitled to use "VR" before the qualifying period and eligibility criteria for the VRSM have been achieved. The VRSM and the post-nominals VR are therefore not directly connected.

The postnominals "VR" should follow the post-nominal letters denoting the grant of any state Honour or decoration, or educational or professional qualification.

== See also ==
- King's Volunteer Reserves Medal (KVRM)
