= Jude Terry =

Jude Terry may refer to:

- Jude Terry (Royal Navy officer) (born 1973), British Royal Navy officer
- Jude Terry (soccer) (born 2008), American soccer player
