= James Dunbar-Nasmith =

British architect (1927–2023)

Sir James Duncan Dunbar-Nasmith CBE FRIBA FRSE FRIAS (15 March 1927 – 18 March 2023) was a British conservation architect.

James Dunbar-Nasmith was born in Devon, the son of Admiral Sir Martin Dunbar-Nasmith, VC KCB KCMG (1883–1965) and Beatrix Justina Dunbar-Dunbar-Rivers CBE. His elder brother was Rear-Admiral David Dunbar-Nasmith, CB DCL (1921–1997). He was educated at Lockers Park School, Winchester College and Trinity College, Cambridge.

Dunbar-Nasmith was best known as the architect of Sunninghill Park, the former home of The Duke of York, and Balmoral Estate architect. He was in professional practice as a partner in Law & Dunbar-Nasmith, architects, Edinburgh (since 1957), and Hilger, Law & Dunbar-Nasmith, architects, Wiesbaden (since 1993).

Dunbar-Nasmith was Professor and Head of the Department of Architecture at Heriot-Watt University, Edinburgh, and the Edinburgh College of Art, 1978–1988, and later Emeritus Professor at Heriot Watt University.

Dunbar-Nasmith died on 18 March 2023, at the age of 96.

== Honours ==
Dunbar-Nasmith was appointed a Commander of the Order of the British Empire (CBE) in the 1976 Birthday Honours "for public services in Scotland", and knighted in the 1996 Birthday Honours "for services to Architecture."
