= Enard =

Enard (or Énard in French) may refer to:

- Emile-Christophe Enard (1896–1906), Roman Catholic bishop of the Diocese of Cahors, France
- Mathias Énard (born 1972), French writer and translator
- Enard Bay, a large remote tidal coastal embayment on the west coast of Scotland
- Énard River, a tributary of Chibougamau Lake in Québec, Canada

== See also ==
- HMS Enard Bay (K435), an anti-aircraft frigate of the Royal Navy
