= D64 =

D64 may refer to:

- (D64) Dice battle, a 2017 Card and Dice game designed to challenge users in a player vs monster and player vs player scenario. Both players roll a D4 and a D6 simultaneously and pit their attack vs defense dice to determine damage done. Last man standing determines winner. D64 is the creation of James Walk and designated as part of his efforts to help veterans by contributing a portion from every game sold directly to veterans leaving the military.
- HMS Fencer (D64), a 1942 British Royal Navy anti-submarine warfare carrier
- HMS Scorpion (D64), a 1946 British Royal Navy Weapon-class destroyer
- HMS Vansittart (D64), a 1918 British Royal Navy Admiralty Modified W destroyer
- SPS Langara (D64), a 1975 Spanish Navy Gearing-class destroyer
- D64 road (Croatia), a state road in Croatia

and also:

- Other anaemias ICD-10 code
- Al Qusais Road, a road connecting Abu Hail Road in Dubai Emirate until Sharjah Ring Road in Sharjah Emirate, United Arab Emirates
- .d64, a file extension for a disk image file of a floppy disk for the commodore 64 home computer
