= Admiral Cooke =

Admiral Cooke may refer to:

- Anthony Cooke (Royal Navy officer) (1927–2019), British Royal Navy rear admiral
- Charles M. Cooke Jr. (1886–1970), U.S. Navy admiral
- David Cooke (Royal Navy officer) (1955–2014), British Royal Navy rear admiral
- Gervaise Cooke (1911–1976), British Royal Navy rear admiral
- Henry D. Cooke (admiral) (1879–1958), U.S. Navy rear admiral

== See also ==
- Admiral Cook (disambiguation)
