= Admiral Kerr =

Admiral Kerr may refer to:

- John Kerr (Royal Navy officer) (1937–2019), British Royal Navy admiral
- Mark Kerr (Royal Navy officer, born 1864) (1864–1944), British Royal Navy admiral
- Mark Kerr (Royal Navy officer, born 1949) (born 1949), British Royal Navy rear admiral
- Lord Mark Kerr (Royal Navy officer) (1776–1840), British Royal Navy vice admiral
- Lord Walter Kerr (1839–1927), British Royal Navy admiral
- William Munro Kerr (1876–1959), British Royal Navy vice admiral
