= Wilmot Fawkes =

Royal Navy Admiral (1846–1926)

Admiral Sir Wilmot Fawkes GCB KCVO
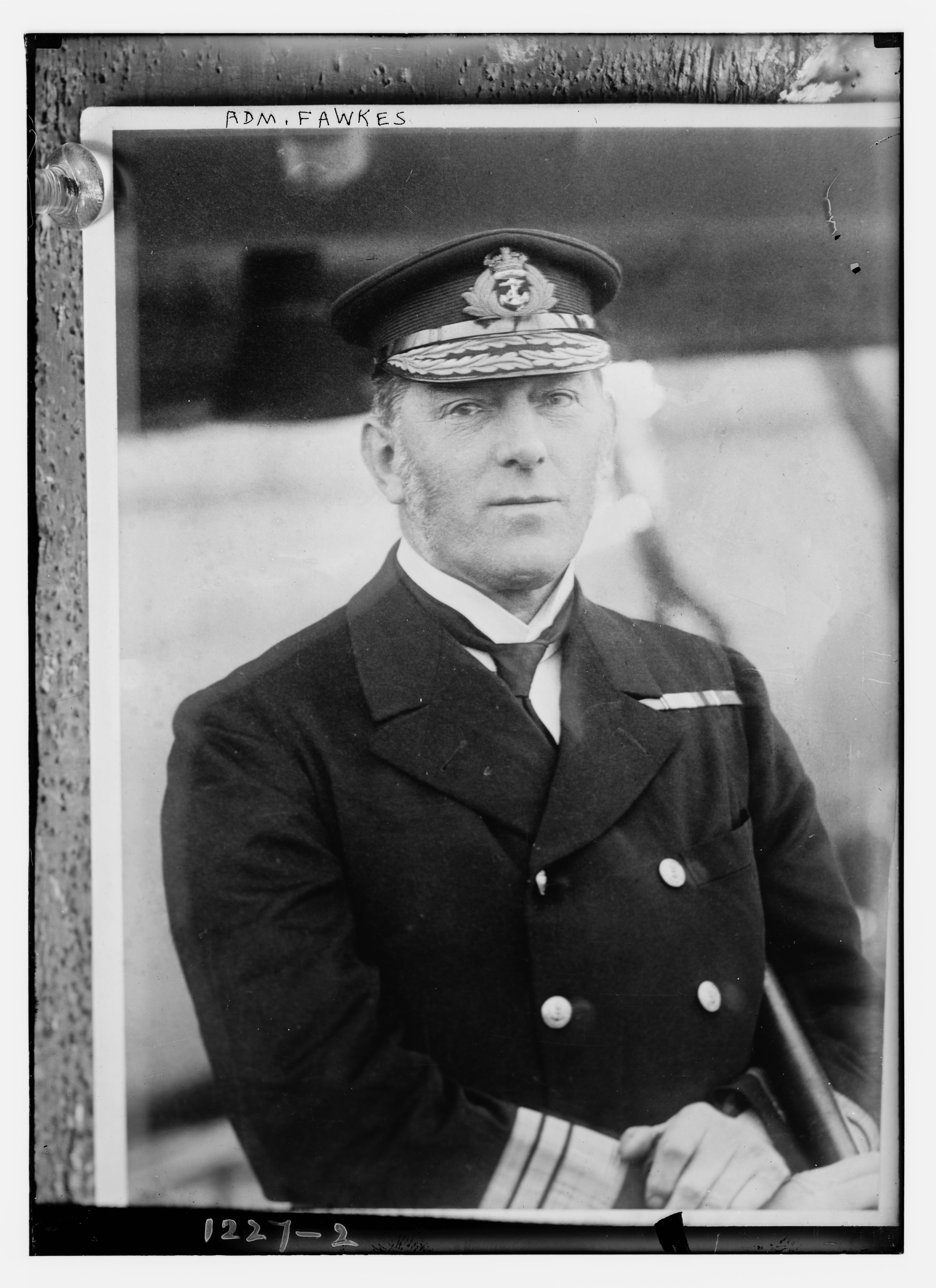
- as a Vice Admiral
- Born: 22 December 1846; Barnet, Hertfordshire
- Died: 29 May 1926 (aged 79); Chippenham, Wiltshire
- Military career
- Allegiance: United Kingdom
- Branch: Royal Navy
- Service years: 1860–1911
- Rank: Admiral
- Commands: HMS Raleigh; HMS Mercury; HMS Terrible; HMS Canopus; Australia Station; Plymouth Command
- Awards: Knight Grand Cross of the Order of the Bath; Knight Commander of the Royal Victorian Order

Admiral Sir Wilmot Hawksworth Fawkes, GCB, KCVO (22 December 1846 – 29 May 1926) was a Royal Navy officer who went on to be Commander-in-Chief, Plymouth.

== Naval career ==
Fawkes joined the Royal Navy in 1860 and by 1867 had been promoted to lieutenant. He served mainly in the Mediterranean on HMS Prince Consort and Research. In 1872 he matriculated at St John's College, Cambridge, but did not graduate. In 1880, he was promoted to commander and served on HMS Northampton on the North America and West Indies station. After a few years, he returned to England to command of the royal yacht Osborne, a post he held for two years.

Promoted to captain in 1886, he was given command of HMS Raleigh before going on to be Naval Advisor to the Inspector General of Fortifications in 1891. He then took command of HMS Mercury on the China station, returning to England in 1897 to be Private Naval Secretary to the First Lord of the Admiralty in 1897. On 1 January 1899, he was appointed an aide-de-camp to Queen Victoria. He was appointed in command of the new battleship HMS Canopus which he commissioned in December 1899 for service in the Mediterranean Fleet, but in late 1900 was back in England as Private Secretary to Lord Selborne, First Lord of the Admiralty. Promoted to rear admiral on 1 January 1901, he was invested as a Commander of the Royal Victorian Order (CVO) by King Edward VII on 11 August 1902 for his part in organizing the fleet review held at Spithead on 16 August 1902 for the coronation of the King.

In October 1902, he was appointed in command of the Cruiser Squadron, and temporary hoisted his flag in HMS Hero, tender to the gunnery school Excellent. The armoured cruiser HMS Good Hope was scheduled to be his flagship for the squadron, but was first ordered to take the Colonial Secretary Joseph Chamberlain on a trip to South Africa. Fawkes hoisted his flag on the Good Hope on 23 November, and the ship left Portsmouth with Chamberlain and his wife on board two days later.

He was appointed Commander-in-Chief, Australia Station in 1905, became Commander-in-Chief, Plymouth in 1908 and retired in 1911.

== Retirement ==
Fawkes had married Juliana Hannah Mary Spicer in 1875 and when he retired in 1911 they lived at Steel Cross, Crowborough. His wife died in 1916, and Fawkes died suddenly in 1926 at Spye Park, Chippenham when he was visiting his brother-in-law Captain Spicer.

Military offices
Preceded by Hedworth Lambton	Private Secretary to the First Lord of the Admiralty; 1897–1899	Succeeded by Maurice Bourke
Preceded by Maurice Bourke	Private Secretary to the First Lord of the Admiralty; 1900–1902	Succeeded by Hugh Tyrwhitt
Preceded by Sir Arthur Fanshawe	Commander-in-Chief, Australia Station; 1905–1907	Succeeded by Sir Richard Poore
Preceded by Sir Lewis Beaumont	Commander-in-Chief, Plymouth; 1908–1911	Succeeded by Sir William May
