= Roger Dimmock =

Royal Navy Rear Admiral (1935–2014)

Rear-Admiral Roger Dimmock CB
- Born: 27 May 1935; Fareham, Hampshire, England
- Died: 6 May 2014 (aged 78)
- Spouse: Lesley Reid (m. 1958)
- Military career
- Allegiance: United Kingdom
- Branch: Royal Navy
- Service years: 1953–1989
- Rank: Rear-Admiral
- Commands: Naval Air Command; HMS Hermes; RNAS Culdrose; HMS Seahawk; HMS Naiad; HMS Berwick
- Awards: Companion of the Order of the Bath

Rear-Admiral Roger Charles Dimmock, CB (27 May 1935 – 6 May 2014) was a Royal Navy officer who served as Naval Secretary from 1985 to 1987.

== Naval career ==
Educated at Price's School, Dimmock joined the Royal Navy in 1953 and specialised in naval aviation. He commanded the frigates HMS Berwick and HMS Naiad. He was appointed Chief Staff Officer to the Flag Officer, Carriers and Amphibious Ships in 1978 and given command of HMS Seahawk in 1980 before taking command of the aircraft carrier HMS Hermes in 1982. He went on to be Director of Naval Air Warfare at the Ministry of Defence in 1983, Director of Naval Staff Duties from January to February 1985, then promoted to rear admiral on 5 February 1985, before appointment to Naval Secretary that year, and in 1987 to Flag Officer Naval Air Command. He retired in 1989.

== Family and later life ==
In 1958 Dimmock married Lesley Patricia Reid; they had three daughters.

Dimmock laid the wreath at the Remembrance Day Service at Fareham in November 2005. He died on 6 May 2014.

Military offices
Preceded by Richard Thomas	Naval Secretary; 1985–1987	Succeeded by Norman King
