= Princess Viktoria of Prussia =

Viktoria of Prussia
- Princess Adolf of Schaumburg-Lippe
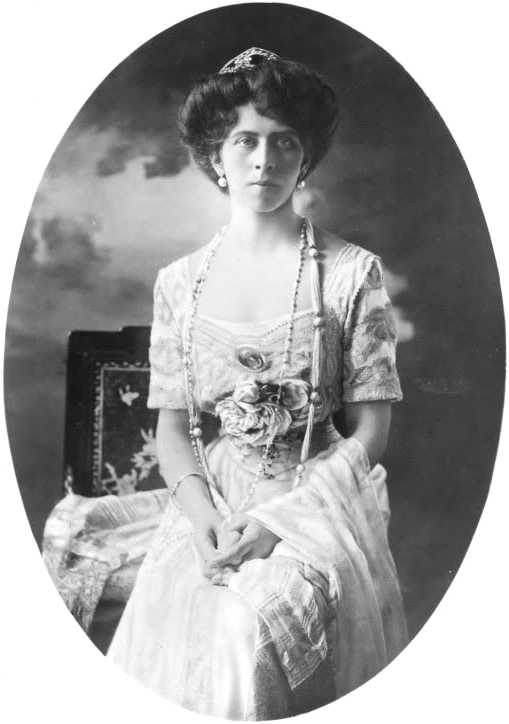
- Princess Viktoria, c. 1908
- Born: 12 April 1866; New Palace, Potsdam, Kingdom of Prussia
- Died: 13 November 1929 (aged 63); Hospital of St. Francis, Bonn, Weimar Republic
- Burial: 16 November 1929; Schloss Friedrichshof, Kronberg im Taunus
- Spouse: Prince Adolf of Schaumburg-Lippe (m. 1890; died 1916); Alexander Zoubkoff (m. 1927; sep. 1928)
Names
- Friederike Amalia Wilhelmine Viktoria
- House: Hohenzollern
- Father: Frederick III, German Emperor
- Mother: Victoria, Princess Royal

Princess Viktoria of Prussia (Friederike Amalia Wilhelmine Viktoria; 12 April 1866 – 13 November 1929) was the second daughter of Frederick III, German Emperor and his wife Victoria, Princess Royal, eldest daughter of Queen Victoria. Born a member of the Prussian royal house of Hohenzollern, she became Princess Adolf of Schaumburg-Lippe following her first marriage in 1890.

Raised by her mother in a close, liberal, and anglophile environment, Viktoria fell in love with Alexander of Battenberg, the Prince of Bulgaria, but there was great opposition to the match and the couple never married. Following the end of her courtship with Alexander, Viktoria suffered from an eating disorder and was unlucky in her search for a suitable husband. She eventually married Prince Adolf of Schaumburg-Lippe. Adolf died during the First World War, two years before the German Empire came to an end. In 1927, Viktoria caused a royal scandal by marrying a university student 35 years her junior. She died at the age of 63 in Bonn.

== Early life ==
=== Birth and baptism ===
Viktoria was born on 12 April 1866 in the New Palace in Potsdam, to Crown Prince Frederick William and Crown Princess Victoria of Prussia. Her father was the only son of King Wilhelm I of Prussia and Princess Augusta of Saxe-Weimar; her mother, Victoria ("Vicky"), was the eldest child of Queen Victoria of the United Kingdom and her consort, Prince Albert. Viktoria was baptised in the New Palace as Friederike Amalia Wilhelmine Viktoria on 24 May 1866, the birthday of her grandmother Queen Victoria, who was also one of her godparents. Other sponsors included her grandfather the King of Prussia, and Princess Marie of Hohenzollern-Sigmaringen. She was called "Moretta" or "little Vicky" by her family.

Following the birth of Princess Viktoria, Queen Victoria wrote a letter to her daughter Crown Princess Victoria, mentioning that she was happy with her granddaughter being named after her:

"I am much pleased & touched that the dear, new baby (& long may she remain the Baby!) is to be called after me", Victoria wrote Vicky, "as I cannot deny that it pained me very much that 4 children were born without one being called after either of your parents. However I know that you could not help that".

=== Youth and education ===
Viktoria was her parents' fifth child and second daughter. Two months after her birth, on 18 June 1866, Viktoria's nearly two-year-old brother, Sigismund, died of meningitis. Sigismund could not receive the best medical treatment because Dr. Wegner and his colleagues had gone with the army to the front. On 19 June Vicky wrote to her mother Queen Victoria:

"...I wish you to know all, you are so kind, darling Mama, that you will wish to hear all about the last terrible days, I cannot describe them. I am calm now, for Fritz's sake and my little ones', but oh how bitter is this cup..."

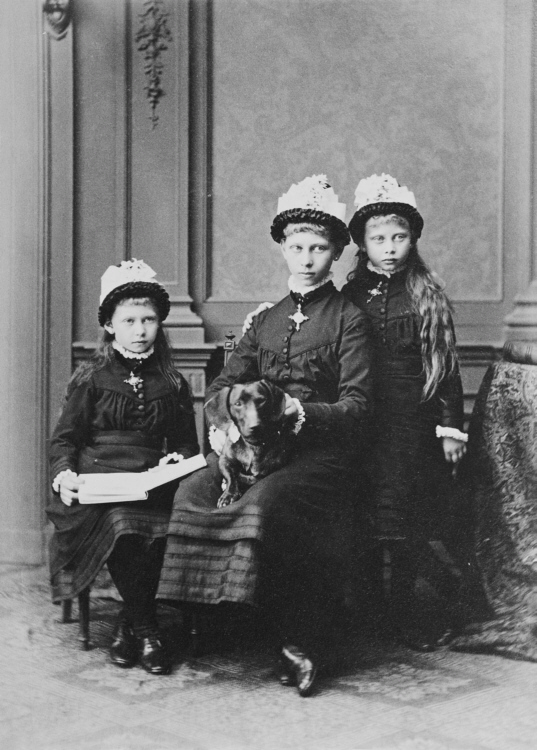
Young Viktoria and her sisters, Sophie (left) and Margaret (right).

Following this event, Viktoria's mother chose to raise her younger children herself, as opposed to leaving them in the care of tutors and governesses as she had with her older children, Wilhelm, Charlotte, and Henry. For this reason, Viktoria and her three younger siblings, Waldemar, Sophie, and Margaret, were far closer to their parents. Eleven-year-old Waldemar died of diphtheria in 1879. Viktoria and her siblings lived at two main residences, the New Palace in Potsdam and the Kronprinzenpalais in Berlin. In 1871, Viktoria's grandfather Wilhelm I became German Emperor, and her parents became Crown Prince and Princess of a unified German Empire. Still, the Crown Princely couple raised their children away from the Berlin court, which disliked Frederick William and Victoria and their liberal beliefs. The couple hoped to instill these beliefs in their children through an education system similar to the one created by Vicky's father, Prince Albert. Much of Viktoria's childhood care and education was based on that of Vicky's British upbringing, and Viktoria and her younger siblings had British nannies and went on many trips to visit their family in Britain. Raised in a close environment, less strict than that of her elder siblings' childhood, Viktoria was an active and enthusiastic child. She attended weekly dance lessons and enjoyed riding her Shetland pony, a gift from Queen Victoria. She also liked to garden and to cook, and at her mother's suggestion went to the palace kitchens for lessons, though her privileged upbringing meant she knew very little about kitchen work.

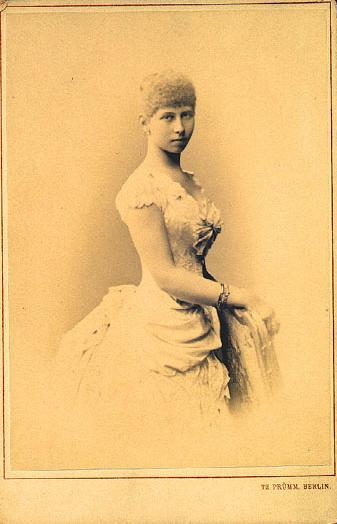
An official portrait of the young Princess Viktoria of Prussia.

== Young adult years ==
=== Alexander of Battenberg ===
In 1881, Alexander, Prince of Bulgaria, born Prince Alexander of Battenberg, who had been the sovereign of the Principality of Bulgaria since 1879, visited the Prussian court at the behest of Viktoria's mother. As her mother and Queen Victoria recommended Alexander as a possible match, 16-year-old Viktoria quickly caught their enthusiasm and by the time of Sandro's next visit the following spring, she had fallen in love with the attractive prince.

Though her parents wanted the couple to marry, much of Viktoria's Prussian family was opposed. Her elder siblings, paternal grandparents Emperor Wilhelm I and Empress Augusta, and German chancellor Otto von Bismarck were opposed to the match. Alexander of Battenberg's actions in Bulgaria irritated the Russian tsar, and it was feared that if Viktoria married Alexander, Tsar Alexander III would be offended, even though Alexander of Battenberg and Tsar Alexander III were first cousins. Furthermore, Alexander was born of a morganatic marriage, and his position as Prince of Bulgaria was unstable; he had more to gain than Viktoria through marriage to a daughter of the future German emperor. By 1888, pushback from Wilhelm I and Bismarck all but forced Viktoria and her parents to give up on the marriage.

=== Depression and changing life ===
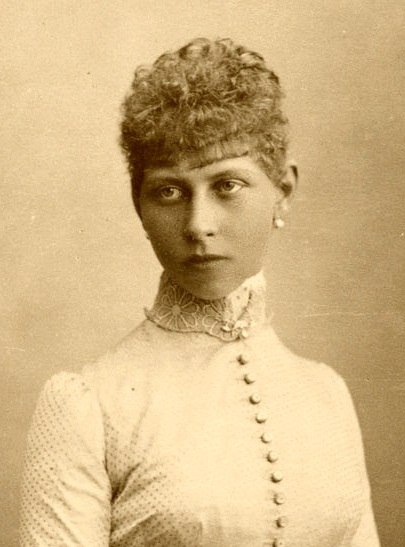
Viktoria of Prussia, 1885.

As Viktoria was losing hope of marrying Sandro, her grandfather Emperor Wilhelm I and her father Crown Prince Frederick William were both ailing, and her sister Sophie was preparing to move to Athens in order to marry the Crown Prince of Greece. The Emperor died on 9 March 1888, and Frederick William and Victoria became the new emperor and empress. Frederick, however, was dying of throat cancer, and reigned for only 99 days before succumbing to his illness on 15 June. Viktoria's eldest brother, now Emperor Wilhelm II, despised his parents and, though Frederick had requested in his will that Wilhelm allow Viktoria to marry Sandro, the new emperor instead wrote to Sandro to definitively end the couple's courtship. Sandro returned to Viktoria all the letters and gifts she had sent to him, and wrote her a farewell note. Viktoria, now 22, worried she might end up a spinster. Not considered an attractive girl – especially by herself – Viktoria tried to improve her appearance by dieting "maniacally" to the point of starving herself. Wrote her mother to Queen Victoria in 1889:

You would indeed make me most happy and do me the greatest favour, if you could induce Moretta not to be so foolish about her food! Her one craze is to be thinǃ She starves completely, touches no milk, no sugar, no bread, no sweets, no soup, no butter, nothing but a scrap piece of meat and apples, wh. is not enough! She will ruin her health and she has a fine strong constitution. She goes to Bed too late, and takes almost too much exercise, I have begged and prayed, ordered and threatened, all to no effect. She is quite fanatical on the subject! Her pretty figure is quite spoilt from being too thin!!

Viktoria likely had some form of disordered eating. Subtly pushed out of the Berlin social sphere by Wilhelm, she lived with her mother and younger sister Margaret at Schloss Friedrichshof in Hesse. Vicky sent the depressed Viktoria to Britain, to recover and spend time with her British relatives.

=== Further suitors ===
Following the collapse of Viktoria's plans to marry Sandro, her mother (now known as "Empress Frederick") and grandmother, Queen Victoria, continued to look for possible suitors, and enlisted the help of the Duchess of Edinburgh and Princess of Leiningen. Though she was not thought of as exceedingly attractive, Viktoria was described as having "immense charm". Prince Carl of Sweden, Duke of Västergötland, "refused to consider marrying her"; this news worsened Viktoria's disordered eating. In 1889, Grand Duke Alexander Mikhailovich of Russia was proposed, but ultimately turned down the offer; his cousin Grand Duke Peter Nikolaevich was also considered. Another suitor was Ernest, the future Prince of Hohenlohe-Langenburg; he later married Viktoria's first cousin Alexandra of Saxe-Coburg and Gotha. Crown Prince Carlos of Portugal was proposed by Otto von Bismarck, but Viktoria refused to convert to Catholicism. Even commoners were suggested: the British Captain the Hon. Maurice Bourke, a younger son of Richard Bourke, 6th Earl of Mayo, was proposed by Queen Victoria; he was seriously considered. As her elder sister, Charlotte, began gossiping about her love life at court, Viktoria became convinced she would never marry, and told her grandmother she was no longer interested in marriage.

== First marriage and adult life ==
=== Engagement and wedding ===
In June 1890, Viktoria, with her mother and sister Margaret, visited their cousin Marie of Nassau, the widowed Princess of Wied. Among the other guests was Prince Adolf of Schaumburg-Lippe, a younger son of Adolf I, Prince of Schaumburg-Lippe. Adolf and Viktoria spent time together and, during the same visit, Adolf proposed on 11 June. Viktoria's mother had previously considered Adolf as a marriage candidate, but had considered him unworthy of her daughter; she wept at the news of the couple's engagement. Although Viktoria said in her memoirs that she had loved Adolf at first sight, she wrote to her mother that she had only married him out of "desperation from fear at withering on the vine." When Queen Victoria inspected Adolf, she approved of him, but did not believe that Viktoria was entirely happy, nor did Vicky. Furthermore, Adolf held only the style of Serene Highness, while Viktoria was a Royal Highness and the daughter of an Emperor. The widowed Empress continued to suggest other suitors, but was thwarted, especially by Wilhelm II, who was highly in favour of the match. In the months leading up to the wedding, Viktoria remained depressed.

The wedding festivities began two days before the ceremony. The wedding party and the couple's families attended the opera, and the next day Viktoria's mother held a banquet for the guests. Viktoria and Adolf married on 19 November 1890 in a Lutheran ceremony, in the chapel of Berlin's Alte Schloss. Much of Viktoria's extended family made up the nearly sixty royal guests, as well as the large wedding party. Viktoria's brother Wilhelm gave the toast. Viktoria wore a wedding gown of "cream satin, brocaded and trimmed with wild roses and silver", and a veil "of tulle interwoven with silver and surmounted with a wreath of orange blossoms and myrtles". Much of the ceremony was curtailed; there was no Fackeltanz, or torchlight dance.

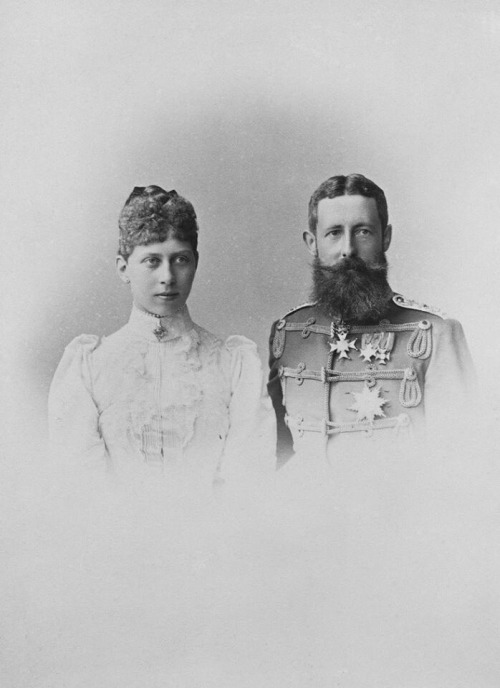
Engagement photo of Princess Viktoria of Prussia and Prince Adolf of Schaumburg-Lippe

Viktoria and Adolf had a long honeymoon, during which they travelled throughout Europe and the Mediterranean, stopping in Greece to visit Viktoria's sister Sophie. They were forced to cut this final visit short in order to return to Germany for medical care, as Viktoria had suffered an early miscarriage. The couple did not conceive again and the marriage remained childless. Viktoria and Adolf had a peaceful marriage, and mutually respected one another. However, Viktoria did not love her husband, and in the later years of her marriage considered divorcing Adolf to marry one of his nephews. Adolf died in 1916.

=== Princess Adolf of Schaumburg-Lippe ===
Adolf purchased from a cloth manufacturer a neoclassical palace that would become the Palais Schaumburg, in Bonn. Viktoria was often alone there, as Adolf was busy with his military duties. Viktoria lived a quiet life in Bonn, and continued to frequently visit members of her large family. Often lonely due to Adolf's frequent absences, she enjoyed decorating and other hobbies. Adolf installed tennis courts at their home upon Viktoria's request, and encouraged her love of gardening. Soon, however, Viktoria admitted she was bored and unhappy. She seems to have fallen into another bout of depression, and resumed her drastic dieting. Her disordered eating became so severe members of her family again became worried for her. In 1893, she was treated for anemia in Hesse.

From 1895 to 1897, Adolf was regent of the Principality of Lippe during the first two years of the reign of Alexander, Prince of Lippe, who was mentally handicapped. Viktoria and Adolf entered Lippe's capital, Detmold, on 4 May 1895 and remained there until Adolf's term as regent ended. During this time, Viktoria enjoyed her new public responsibilities as wife of the principality's regent, and her mental health improved. Queen Victoria was upset when, in September 1895, Adolf requested that Viktoria end her visit to her widowed and lonely mother. Adolf was later passed over as regent and prince, despite being told by Alexander's predecessor that he was next in line.

Viktoria was thrown from her carriage in 1901 while out driving in Bonn, but she was not seriously injured. That year, between the deaths of her grandmother Queen Victoria on 22 January and her mother Vicky on 5 August, she celebrated her 35th birthday with family at Friedrichshof.

== Later life ==
=== Widowhood and First World War ===
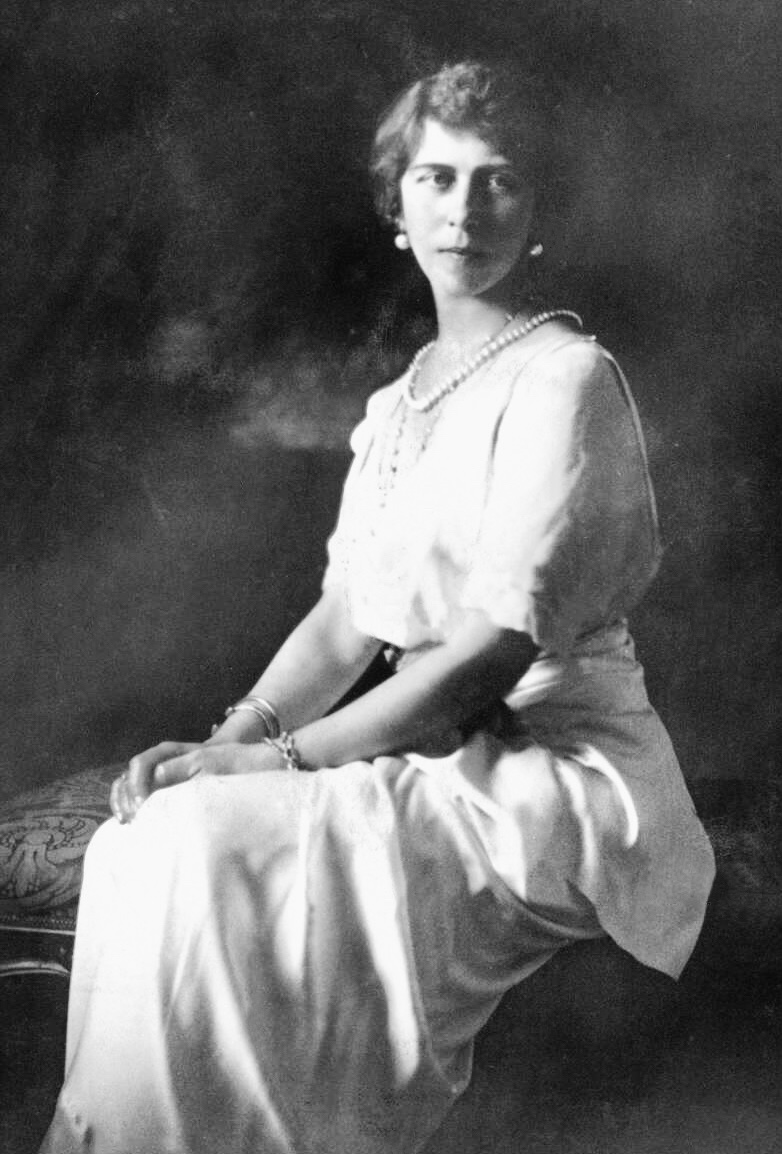
Princess Viktoria (c. 1915)

In 1914, Germany entered the First World War. For Viktoria, who adored her mother's British homeland, the war was doubly stressful. Despite being the sister of the Kaiser of Germany, Viktoria was very sympathetic to the British cause. In 1915, the 49-year-old "but very wealthy and young looking" Viktoria left Berlin and moved into a "luxuriously furnished" castle in Bonn. The war years threw Viktoria's life into chaos: Adolf died in July 1916, after nearly thirty years of marriage; in 1917, Viktoria's brother-in-law the King of the Hellenes, who married her sister Queen Sophia of Greece in 1890, was deposed; and in 1918, her brother Wilhelm II was forced to abdicate and the German nobles and royals legally lost their titles under the new Weimar Republic.

After the war, she met her first cousin once removed, the future King George VI of the United Kingdom, and expressed the wish that they "would all be friends again soon". George told her he did not think this would be possible for a great many years and "the sooner she knows the real feeling of bitterness which exists here against her country the better".

=== Second marriage ===
In 1927, Viktoria held a party for university students at her castle in Bonn. One of the students in attendance was Alexander Anatolievitch Zoubkoff (Russian: Aleksandr Anatolyevich Zoubkov), a Russian immigrant who was studying law at the University of Bonn. Zoubkoff told Viktoria that he had fled the Russian Revolution and that he had been a baron. Infatuated with Zoubkoff, Viktoria provided the young student – 35 years her junior – with lavish gifts; he, in turn, proposed marriage. Without asking permission from the former Emperor Wilhelm, Viktoria renounced her titles and married Zoubkoff first at the town hall in Bonn, then in a Greek Orthodox ceremony at which none of her family was in attendance. The couple were married on 19 November 1927, which would have been Viktoria and Adolf's 37th wedding anniversary. She wore the lace bridal veil worn by her mother in 1858. Viktoria was 61, while Alexander was only 27. The two had known one another for only two months, and their wedding was a royal and society scandal.

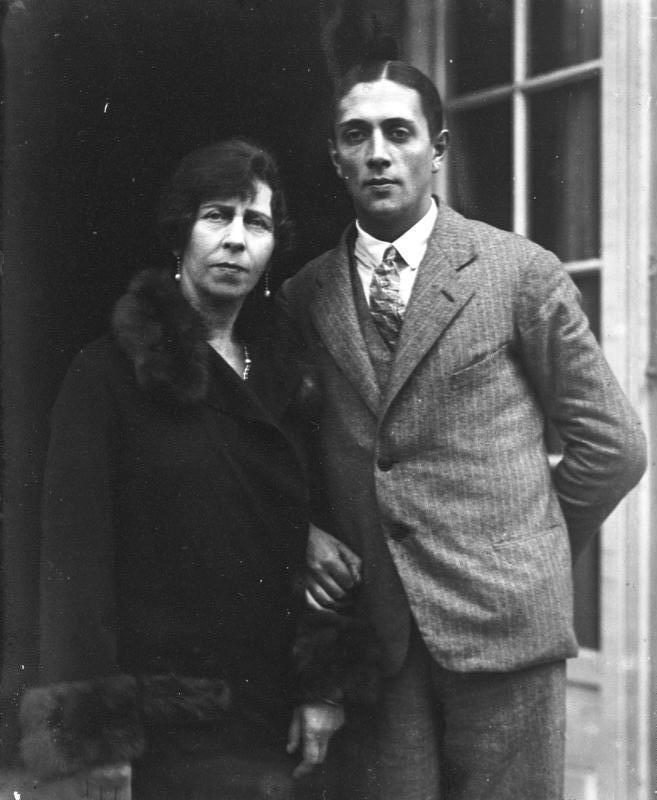
Princess Viktoria of Prussia with her second husband, Alexander Zoubkoff, 1927

Soon after the wedding, Alexander Zoubkoff, whom Viktoria called "Sascha", began spending large amounts of Viktoria's dwindling fortune. Alexander's financial troubles, combined with his public misconduct, led to his deportation from Germany not long after.

He went to Luxembourg and worked there as a waiter. The restaurant advertised with a sign that read: "The Emperor's brother-in-law is serving you here". Although she had at first stood by her husband, in 1928, Viktoria separated from him, considering his antics too much.

Her own financial struggles caught up with her, and Viktoria was forced to auction off nearly all of her belongings.

The sale, conducted by the Cologne auctioneers M. Lempertz, attracted far less interest than had been anticipated, and it was estimated that the proceeds from the auction would have covered only one-third of her debts (which were reported to have been 900,000 marks, or £45,000 sterling).

Viktoria was forced to move into a single rented room in the suburbs of Bonn. That same year Viktoria caused another scandal by filing for divorce from Zoubkoff after less than two years of marriage, on the grounds that his behaviour had resulted in his expulsion from Germany, he was unable to maintain her, and that "conjugal relations did not exist".

Before they could be divorced, or her siblings could have their marriage annulled, Viktoria came down with a fever and was taken to the Hospital of St Francis, in Bonn, where she was diagnosed with pneumonia. In the hours before her death, her brother Wilhelm and sister Margaret attempted to contact her, but were not allowed. Viktoria died on 13 November 1929, "penniless, lonely, loveless, and without her family's forgiveness". She was buried at Schloss Friedrichshof, the home of her sister Margaret. She was 63.

== Archives ==
Viktoria's letters to her sister Margaret are preserved in the Archive of the House of Hesse, which is kept in Fasanerie Palace in Eichenzell, Germany.

== Titles and styles ==
- 12 April 1866 – 19 November 1890: Her Royal Highness Princess Viktoria of Prussia
- 19 November 1890 – 9 July 1927: Her Royal Highness Princess Adolf of Schaumburg-Lippe
- 9 July 1927 – 13 November 1929: Mrs Viktoria Zoubkoff (Note: Her memoirs, published following her marriage to Alexander Zoubkoff, were published under the name "Viktoria Zoubkoff, b. Princess of Prussia, rel. Princess of Schaumburg-Lippe".)

== Ancestry ==
Ancestors of Princess Viktoria of Prussia

8. Frederick William III of Prussia
4. Wilhelm I, German Emperor
9. Duchess Louise of Mecklenburg-Strelitz
2. Frederick III, German Emperor
10. Charles Frederick, Grand Duke of Saxe-Weimar-Eisenach
5. Princess Augusta of Saxe-Weimar-Eisenach
11. Grand Duchess Maria Pavlovna of Russia
1. Princess Viktoria of Prussia
12. Ernest I, Duke of Saxe-Coburg and Gotha
6. Prince Albert of Saxe-Coburg and Gotha
13. Princess Louise of Saxe-Gotha-Altenburg
3. Victoria, Princess Royal
14. Prince Edward, Duke of Kent and Strathearn
7. Victoria of the United Kingdom
15. Princess Victoria of Saxe-Coburg-Saalfeld

== Sources ==
- Pakula, Hannah (1995). An Uncommon Woman The Empress Frederick: Daughter of Queen Victoria, Wife of the Crown Prince of Prussia, Mother of Kaiser Wilhelm. New York: Simon & Schuster. ISBN 0-684-84216-5.
- Van der Kiste, John. The Prussian Princesses, 2014
