= Gervaise Cooke =

Rear-Admiral Gervaise Cooke CB DSC
- Born: 19 October 1911; Marylebone, London
- Died: 30 January 1976 (aged 64); Chelsea, London
- Military career
- Allegiance: United Kingdom
- Branch: Royal Navy
- Service years: 1925–1968
- Rank: Rear-Admiral
- Commands: HMS Modeste; HMS Finistere; HMS Broadsword; HMS Battleaxe
- Conflicts: World War II
- Awards: Companion of the Order of the Bath; Distinguished Service Cross

Rear-Admiral John Gervaise Beresford Cooke CB DSC (19 October 1911 – 30 January 1976) was a Royal Navy officer who became Naval Secretary.

== Naval career ==
Cooke was the son of Justice John Fitzpatrick Cooke and Eleanora Caroline Lucia Macky. Educated at Marlborough College and the Royal Naval College, Dartmouth, Cooke joined the Royal Navy in 1925 and specialised in gunnery. He served in World War II in destroyers and at the Admiralty. After the War he was given command of the sloop HMS Modeste and then the destroyer HMS Finistere and then moved to the Naval Ordnance Department of the Admiralty. He was given command of the destroyers HMS Broadsword and then HMS Battleaxe between 1950 and 1951 and then joined the staff of the Commander-in-Chief, Mediterranean Fleet in 1952. He went on to be deputy director of Naval Ordnance at the Admiralty in 1955, Commander of the Admiralty Surface Weapons Establishment in 1959 and Assistant Naval Attaché in Washington D. C. in 1961. His last appointments were as Assistant Chief of the Naval Staff (Warfare) at the Admiralty in 1963 and as Naval Secretary in 1966 before he retired in 1968.

In retirement he lived in Owlesbury in Hampshire.

== Family ==
In 1941, he married Helen Beatrice Cameron, granddaughter of Sir William Gordon Cameron. They had three sons, including Jonathan Gervaise Fitzpatrick Cooke OBE of the Royal Navy, and one daughter.

Military offices
Preceded by Anthony Griffin	Naval Secretary; 1966–1967	Succeeded by David Dunbar-Nasmith
