= Maurice Bourke =

Captain The Honourable Maurice Bourke CMG
- Born: 22 December 1853
- Died: 16 September 1900 (aged 46)
- Military career
- Allegiance: United Kingdom
- Branch: Royal Navy
- Rank: Captain
- Awards: Companion of the Order of St Michael and St George

Captain Maurice Archibald Bourke CMG (22 December 1853 – 16 September 1900) was a Royal Navy officer. He was the flag captain of HMS Victoria at the time of its collision with HMS Camperdown and subsequent sinking, but was absolved of all blame at the court-martial of Victoria's surviving crew, and later became Naval Secretary.

== Naval career ==
Born the son of Richard Bourke, 6th Earl of Mayo, Bourke joined the Royal Navy in 1867 and advanced to command HMS Surprise, Prince Alfred's Royal Yacht in the late 1880s. In 1891 he was made flag captain of HMS Victoria. On 22 June 1893, while manoeuvring under the orders of the commander of the British Mediterranean Fleet, Vice-Admiral Sir George Tryon, Victoria collided with Camperdown near Tripoli, Lebanon and quickly sank, taking 358 crew with her, including Tryon. At the court martial of the entire crew of Victoria, Bourke was absolved of all blame. Bourke also became an extra equerry to Prince Alfred.

He was appointed Assistant Director of Torpedoes in 1895 and Senior Officer of the Newfoundland Fisheries Division in 1896. He went on to be Naval Secretary to the First Lord of the Admiralty and died in office.

== Private life ==
In the late 1880s Bourke was romantically linked with Princess Victoria of Prussia, a grand-daughter of Queen Victoria, and some members of the royal family looked on the match as possible.

Military offices
Preceded by Wilmot Fawkes	Private Secretary to the First Lord of the Admiralty; 1899–1900	Succeeded by Wilmot Fawkes
