= Naval Secretary =

Royal Navy officer

Office of the Naval Secretary
- Ensign of the Royal Navy

- Incumbent; Rear-Admiral Andrew Rose since 2026
- Ministry of Defence
- Reports to: First Sea Lord
- Nominator: Secretary of State for Defence
- Appointer: Monarch of the United Kingdom
- Term length: Not fixed (typically 1–3 years)
- Inaugural holder: Captain John Harrison
- Formation: 1800-current
- Website: royalnavy.mod.uk

The Naval Secretary is the Royal Navy officer who advises the First Sea Lord and Chief of Naval Staff on naval officer appointing (and General Officers).

Their counterpart in the British Army is the Military Secretary. The Royal Air Force equivalent is the Air Secretary. The Director People and Training has taken over the role, combining the responsibilities of Flag Officer Sea Training.

== History ==
The Office of the Naval Secretary was originally established in 1800 when the appointment was styled Private Secretary to the First Lord of the Admiralty and remained so styled until 1911. In 1912 it was re-titled Naval Secretary to the First Lord of the Admiralty.

When the Admiralty department was abolished in 1964 the post was renamed Naval Secretary, colloquially known as "NAVSEC", and now advising the Royal Navy's military head and, consequently, the Navy Board on future appointments. In the case of tri-service appointments, the responsibility was to recommend candidates to the Defence Board.

From 2010 to 2015, Sir David Steel, as Naval Secretary, simultaneously held the additional title of Chief Naval Logistics Officer (as head the Naval Logistics Branch). In 2015 further additional responsibilities were assumed for the Royal Naval Reserve and the title of Flag Officer, Maritime Reserves.

In this capacity the incumbent is responsible for advising the First Sea Lord and Chief of Naval Staff on all matters relating to Flag Officers’ appointing, with Officers with the rank of Commodore and/or Captain delegated to the Office of Assistant to the Naval Secretary who currently holds the rank of Commodore. A March 2020 edition of Navy News noted that the Director People and Training took over the people-related policies and career management below this level from the Naval Secretary.

In May 2021, it was announced that Jude Terry would be the next Naval Secretary, being promoted to rear admiral and taking up the post in 2022. She is the first woman to serve as an admiral in the Royal Navy.

== Secretaries ==
Post holders included:

=== Private Secretary to the First Lord of the Admiralty ===
- 1800 – 1801 John Harrison
- 1801 – 1802 Benjamin Tucker
- 1802 – 1804 George Parker
- 1804 – 1805 William Budge
- 1805 – 1806 John Deas Thomson
- 1806 – 1807 Henry Grant
- 1807 – 1808 Edward Golding
- 1808 – 1809 Captain Robert Moorsom
- 1809 – 1810 Captain Lord Edward O'Brien
- 1810 – 1812 Captain Frederick Edgcumbe
- 1812 – 1823 Captain Robert William Hay
- 1823 – 1827 Captain George Baillie Hamilton
- 1827 – 1828 Captain Robert Cavendish Spencer
- 1828 – 1830 Captain Richard Saunders Dundas
- 1830 – Captain John Thomas Briggs
- 1830 – 1831 Captain Edward Stewart
- 1831 – 1834 Major George Graham (RM)
- 1834 Captain George Gipps
- 1834 – Captain John George Cole
- 1835 – Captain George Gipps
- 1835 – Captain Frederick William Grey
- 1835 – 1839 Captain Henry Tufnell
- 1839 – 1841 William Elliot-Murray-Kynynmound, Viscount Melgund (acting)
- 1841 – 1845 Captain William Baillie-Hamilton
- 1845 – 1846 Captain Richard Saunders Dundas
- 1846 – Captain Henry Spencer Law
- 1846 – 1848 Captain Henry Eden
- 1848 – 1852 Captain Charles Eden
- 1852 – 1853 Captain Frederick Thomas Pelham
- 1853 – 1855 Captain Henry Higgins Donatus O'Brien
- 1855 – 1857 Captain Thomas George Baring
- 1857 – 1858 Captain James Robert Drummond
- 1858 – 1859 Captain Herbert Harley Murray
- 1859 – 1862 Captain John Moore
- 1862 – 1863 Captain Alfred Phillips Ryder
- 1863 – 1866 Captain Robert Hall
- 1866 – Captain Frederick Archibald Campbell
- 1866 – 1867 Captain John Slaney Pakington
- 1867 – 1868 Captain Thomas Brandreth
- 1868 – 1870 Captain Frederick Beauchamp Paget Seymour
- 1870 – 1871 Captain Chandos S. Scudamore Stanhope
- 1871 – 1873 Captain George Tryon
- 1874 – 1876 Captain Michael Culme-Seymour
- 1876 – 1881 Captain William Codrington
- 1881 – 1883 Captain John O. Hopkins
- 1883 – 1885 Captain Lewis A. Beaumont
- 1885 – 1888 Rear-Admiral Lord Walter Kerr
- 1889 – 1892 Rear-Admiral Alfred T. Dale
- 1892 – 1894 Captain Richard H. Hamond
- 1894 – 1897 Captain Hedworth Lambton
- 1897 – 1899 Captain Wilmot Fawkes
- 1899 – 1900 Captain Maurice Bourke
- 1900 – 1902 Captain Wilmot Fawkes
- 1902 – 1905 Captain Hugh Tyrwhitt
- 1905 – 1908 Captain Hugh Evan-Thomas
- 1908 – 1910 Captain Charles Madden

=== Naval Secretaries to the First Lord of the Admiralty ===
Post holders included

- 1911 – 1912 Rear-Admiral Ernest Troubridge
- 1912 – 1913 Rear-Admiral David Beatty
- 1913 – 1914 Rear-Admiral Dudley de Chair
- Aug – Oct 1914 Rear-Admiral Horace Hood
- Oct – Nov 1914 Rear-Admiral Henry Oliver
- 1914 – 1916 Commodore Charles de Bartolomé
- 1916 – 1918 Rear-Admiral Allan Everett
- 1918 – 1921 Rear-Admiral Sir Rudolph Bentinck
- 1921 – 1923 Rear-Admiral Hugh Watson
- 1923 – 1925 Vice-Admiral Michael Hodges
- Apr 1925 Vice-Admiral Sir Hubert Brand
- 1925 – 1927 Rear-Admiral Frank Larken
- 1927 – 1929 Rear-Admiral Eric Fullerton
- 1929 – 1932 Rear-Admiral George Chetwode
- 1932 – 1934 Rear-Admiral Sidney Meyrick
- 1934 – 1937 Rear-Admiral Guy Royle
- 1937 – 1939 Rear-Admiral William Whitworth
- May – Nov 1939 Rear-Admiral Stuart Bonham Carter
- 1939 – 1941 Rear-Admiral Edward Syfret
- 1941 – 1942 Rear-Admiral Arthur Peters
- 1942 – 1944 Rear-Admiral Frederick Dalrymple-Hamilton
- 1944 – 1945 Rear-Admiral Cecil Harcourt
- 1945 – 1946 Rear-Admiral Claud Barry
- 1948 – 1948 Rear-Admiral Maurice Mansergh
- 1948 – 1950 Rear-Admiral Peveril William-Powlett
- 1950 – 1952 Rear-Admiral William Davis
- 1952 – 1954 Rear-Admiral Richard Onslow
- 1954 – 1956 Rear-Admiral David Luce
- 1956 – 1958 Rear-Admiral Alastair Ewing
- 1958 – 1960 Rear-Admiral John Hamilton
- 1960 – 1962 Rear-Admiral Frank Twiss

=== Naval Secretaries ===
Post holders included

- 1962 – 1964 Rear-Admiral John Hayes
- 1964 – 1966 Rear-Admiral William O'Brien
- Jan – Mar 1966 Rear-Admiral Anthony Griffin
- 1966 – 1967 Rear-Admiral Gervaise Cooke
- 1967 – 1970 Rear-Admiral David Dunbar-Nasmith
- 1970 – 1972 Rear-Admiral Iwan Raikes
- 1972 – 1974 Rear-Admiral Gordon Tait
- 1974 – 1976 Rear-Admiral John Forbes
- 1976 – 1978 Rear-Admiral Peter Buchanan
- 1978 – 1980 Rear-Admiral Paul Greening
- 1980 – 1983 Rear-Admiral Richard Fitch
- 1983 – 1985 Rear-Admiral Richard Thomas
- 1985 – 1987 Rear-Admiral Roger Dimmock
- 1987 – 1988 Rear-Admiral Norman King
- 1988 – 1990 Rear-Admiral David Dobson
- 1990 – 1992 Rear-Admiral Christopher Morgan
- 1992 – 1994 Rear-Admiral Malcolm Rutherford
- 1994 – 1996 Rear-Admiral Alan West
- 1996 – 1998 Rear-Admiral Fabian Malbon
- 1998 – 2002 Rear-Admiral Jeremy de Halpert
- 2002 – 2004 Rear-Admiral Mark Kerr
- 2004 – 2005 Rear-Admiral Peter Wilkinson
- 2005 – 2007 Rear-Admiral Richard Ibbotson
- 2007 – 2010 Rear-Admiral Charles Montgomery
- 2010 – 2012 Rear-Admiral David Steel
- 2012 – 2015 Vice-Admiral Jonathan Woodcock
- 2015 – 2018 Rear-Admiral Simon Williams, also Flag Officer Maritime Reserves
- 2018 – 2020 Rear-Admiral Michael Bath
- 2020 – 2022 Rear-Admiral Philip Hally
- 2022 – 2026 Rear-Admiral Jude Terry
- 2026 – present Rear-Admiral Andrew Rose
