= Weapon-class destroyer =

Class of destroyers built for the British Royal Navy

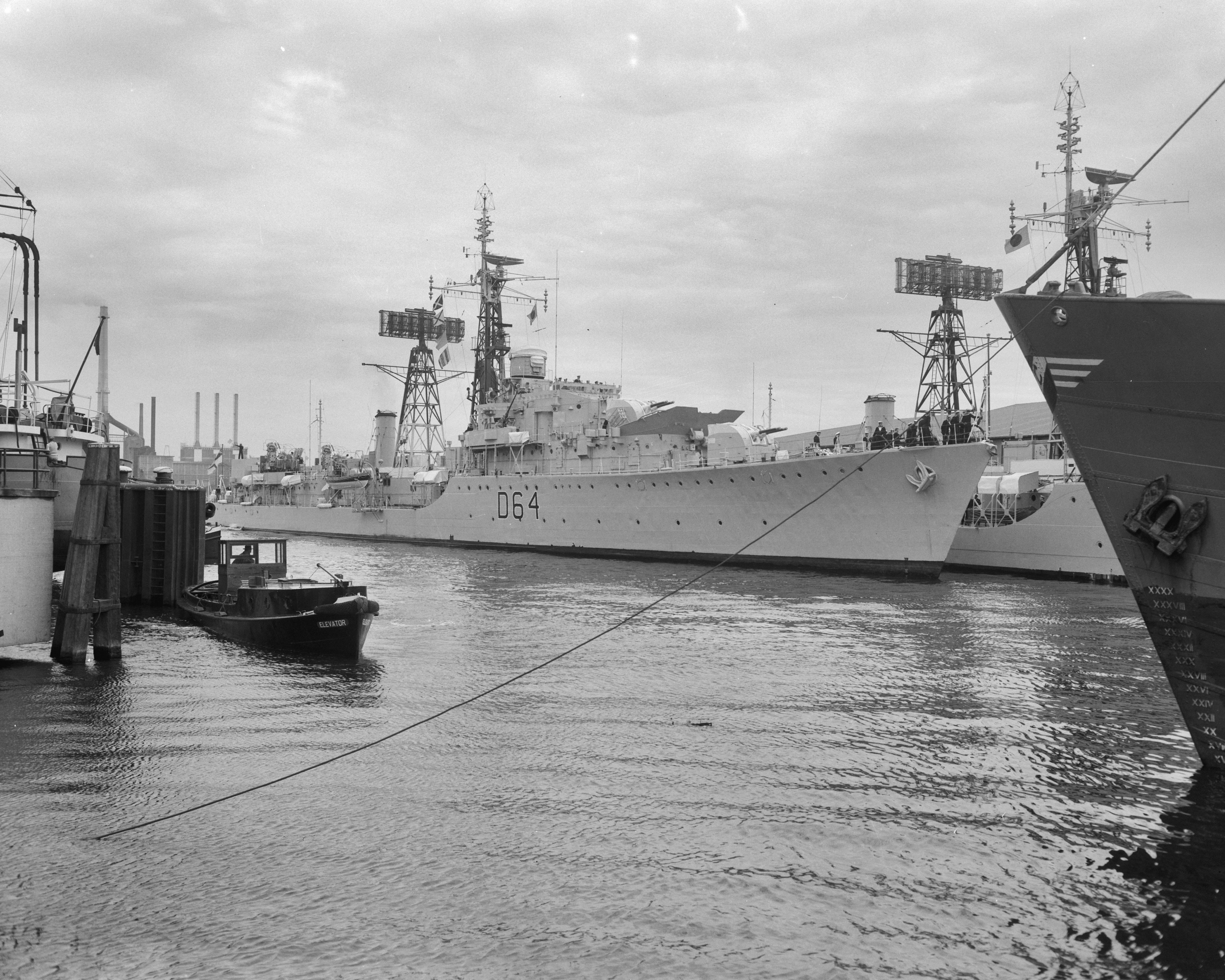
- HMS Scorpion in Amsterdam on 29 September 1961

Class overview
- Name: Weapon class
- Operators: Royal Navy
- Preceded by: C class
- Succeeded by: Battle class
- In commission: 1947-1970
- Planned: 20
- Completed: 4
- Cancelled: 16

General characteristics as built
- Type: Destroyer
- Displacement: 1,980 tons (standard); 2,825 tons (full)
- Length: 365 ft (111 m) o/a, 341.5 ft (104.1 m) p/p
- Beam: 38 ft (12 m)
- Draught: 14.5 ft (4.4 m)
- Propulsion: 2 x Foster-Wheeler water-tube boilers, Parsons double-reduction geared steam turbines, 40,000 shp (30,000 kW) on 2 shafts
- Speed: 31-knot (57 km/h)
- Range: 630 tons oil, 5,000 nmi (9,300 km) at 20 knots (37 km/h)
- Complement: 234 (256 in Battleaxe)
- Sensors & processing systems: Radar Type 293M target indication; Radar Type 291 air warning; Radar Type 275 fire control on Director Mk. VI(M); Radar Type 262 STAAG fire control
- Armament: 4 QF 4 in (102 mm)/L/45 Mk.XVI guns, twin mounts HA Mk.XIX; 6 QF 40 mm Bofors; 2 x (L/60), twin mounts STAAG Mk.II; 2 x single mounts Mk.III; 10 (2x5) tubes for torpedoes Mk. IX (later removed); 2 x Squid A/S mortars; later 1 x Mark 10 Limbo A/S mortar in Scorpion only

General characteristics (A/D conversion)
- Sensors & processing systems: Radar Type 965 surveillance, antenna array AKE-1; Radar Type 293Q target indication; Radar Type 262R fire control on director MRS-8; Radar Type 262 STAAG fire control

The Weapon class was a class of destroyers built for the British Royal Navy towards the end of World War II. They were the smaller counterpart to the Battle class (which followed them) and were the first new destroyer designs for the Royal Navy since the Second World War Emergency Programme. 20 ships were planned, of which only 13 were laid down and 7 were launched, but the cessation of hostilities resulted in only 4 being completed for service. Two of the ships had been previously ordered (as Celt and Centaur) as part of the planned C class, or 15th Emergency flotilla, of 1944, but the orders were changed to the new design.

== Design ==
The Weapon class were an intermediate size built to take advantage of slipways that were too small to be used to build Battle-class destroyers.

The hull length was not much increased over the War Emergency Programme design, but beam and draught were increased to allow for a displacement increase, as the latter design was grossly overweight with the addition of wartime technology to a relatively small hull. Two full sets of torpedo tubes were carried, a somewhat retrospective feature in a late-war design.

A criticism of the older designs was the use of adjacent boiler rooms. This had been adopted to allow for a single funnel, to lower the silhouette and increase the deck space of the relatively small hull. However, this made the ship vulnerable to being disabled by a single hit amidships. To remedy this, the Weapon class adopted the "unit" system, of side-by-side boiler and engine rooms with alternate port/starboard arrangement. The unit arrangement meant that 2 funnels were needed. The forward funnel was trunked up through the foremast and there was a small stump funnel between the torpedo tubes. This led to an unusual and rather unbalanced appearance, similar to that of the Daring class, and the Weapons were not the most attractive of ships.

The main improvement over earlier ships was to remedy the woefully inadequate arrangements for anti-aircraft defence. To this end, three twin 4-inch Mark XIV mountings were carried, remotely controlled by a Type 275 Radar equipped Mark VI(M) director, allowing full blind-fire against aircraft targets. The light battery consisted of 2 of the new STAAG (Stabilised Tachymetric Anti-Aircraft Gun) mounts for twin Bofors 40 mm guns and two single weapons on Mk. II mounts in the bridge wings. The STAAGs were carried on either side aft, and each had its own Type 262 Radar and predictive fire control computer, allowing for automatic blind-fire engagement of targets. The STAAGs were excellent weapons on paper and the firing range, but when exposed to the vibration of a naval gun mounting and the rigour of the elements they were less than reliable. Coupled with a mounting weight of 17 tons, they were something of a disappointment and their post-war service was limited. Type 293 Radar was carried on the lattice foremast for target indication.

To increase the anti-submarine capability of the class, it was decided to reduce the number of 4-inch mounts to 2, and to instead carry 2 "Squid" anti-submarine mortars. In Battleaxe and Broadsword, these replaced 'B' gun, in the others it was 'X' that was lost. The latter arrangement was in fact preferable for the location of the "squid", but less so for gunnery, as it meant that the main weapons were unable to fire aft, which was a criticism also levelled at the Battle class.

All four ships were plagued by their machinery, as the steam turbines had numerous design flaws. The problems were remedied by removing the steam feed to the lower half of the reversing turbine, but this halved reversing power, and as a consequence these ships were slow to decelerate and handled rather sluggishly. This problem proved fatal for Battleaxe, when she was unable to manoeuvre quickly enough to prevent herself being rammed by the frigate Ursa in the Clyde in 1962. The damage was so catastrophic that it was beyond economical repair and she was written off as a total loss and scrapped.

The Weapons were never an entirely satisfactory design, and were criticised for their light gun armament and overly heavy torpedo outfit. Perhaps best thought of as fast fleet frigates, they undoubtedly possessed a quantum increase in fighting efficiency over the wartime emergency ships, and were more than capable of facing the increased threat of the enemy submarine and aircraft. It is possible that the mysterious G or Gael class design, which possessed 2 twin 4.5-inch (110 mm) semi-automatic Mark. VI guns was an attempt to remedy some of the deficiencies of the Weapons.

== Orders and construction ==
The two ships authorised under the 1942 Programme as the Centaur and Celt of the "CE" class were ordered from Whites of Cowes on 3 February 1942; they were renamed Tomahawk and Sword when the order was altered to the new "Intermediate" design.

The 1943 Programme authorised 17 ships to this design. The first six were ordered on 2 April 1943 - Battleaxe and Broadsword (from Yarrow); Carronade and Claymore (from Scotts); and Crossbow and Culverin (from Thornycroft). The next seven were ordered on 24 April - Cutlass and Dagger (from Yarrow); Dirk, Grenade and Halberd (from Scotts); Howitzer (from Thornycroft); and Musket (from White). A final four were ordered on 27 May - Longbow (from Thornycroft); Poniard (from Scotts); and Rifle and Spear (from Denny).

Three ships were cancelled on 22 November 1944 - Grenade, Halberd and Poniard. Eight more were cancelled on 15 October 1945 - Sword, Claymore, Dagger, Dirk, Howitzer, Longbow, Musket and Spear. Another four were cancelled on 23 December 1945 - Carronade, Culverin, Cutlass and Rifle.

== Modification ==
The class were something of an oddity in the post-war Royal Navy, and did not figure in any of the plans for the fleet of the future. They were laid up by 1956, but there emerged a need for fast fleet Aircraft Direction (A/D) ships to accompany the carrier strike force and act as radar pickets, directing fighter cover. The Battle class were being modified for this role, but as a stop-gap, the Weapons were given a more limited conversion. This involved adding a large mainmast amidships for the Radar Type 965 with an AKE-1 "single bedstead" antenna array, with the torpedo tubes replaced by radar offices. The director was replaced with a lighter MRS-8 pattern, possibly to lower topweight associated with the new radar, and all ships had the squids mounted aft and the guns mounted forward. They lacked specialised height finding and aircraft direction radar sets that the Battles possessed, and so were rapidly superseded and returned to reserve.

== Ships ==
Name	Pennant	Builder	Laid Down	Launched	Commissioned	Fate
Battleaxe	G18/D118	Yarrow and Company, Scotstoun	22 April 1944	12 June 1945	23 October 1947	Broken up, 1964
Broadsword	G31/D31	Yarrow and Company, Scotstoun	20 July 1944	5 February 1946	4 October 1948	Broken up, 1968
Cutlass	G74	Yarrow and Company, Scotstoun	28 September 1944	20 March 1946	not completed	Cancelled 23 December 1945, broken up at Troon, 1946
Dagger	G23	Yarrow and Company, Scotstoun	7 March 1945	not launched	not completed	Cancelled 23 December 1945, scrapped on slip
Crossbow	G96/D96	John I. Thornycroft and Company, Woolston	26 August 1944	20 December 1945	4 March 1948	Broken up, 1972
Culverin	G28	John I. Thornycroft and Company, Woolston	27 April 1944	March 1946	not completed	Broken up at Grays, 1946
Howitzer	G44	John I. Thornycroft and Company, Woolston	26 February 1945	not launched	not completed	Cancelled 15 October 1945, scrapped on slip
Longbow	G55	John I. Thornycroft and Company, Woolston	11 April 1945	not launched	not completed	Cancelled 15 October 1945, scrapped on slip
Scorpion (ex-Tomahawk, ex-Centaur)	G64/D64	J. Samuel White, Cowes	16 December 1944	15 August 1946	17 September 1947	Broken up, 1971
Sword (ex-Celt)	G85	J. Samuel White, Cowes	17 September 1945	not launched	not completed	Cancelled 15 October 1945, scrapped on slip
Musket	G78	J. Samuel White, Cowes	not laid down	not launched	not completed	Cancelled 15 October 1945
Lance (ex-Rapier)	none allocated	J. Samuel White, Cowes	not laid down	not launched	not completed	Cancelled 15 October 1945
Carronade	G82	Scotts Shipbuilding & Engineering Company, Greenock	26 April 1944	4 April 1946	not completed	Cancelled 23 December 1945, broken up at Troon, 1946
Claymore	G34	Scotts Shipbuilding & Engineering Company, Greenock	not laid down	not launched	not completed	Cancelled 15 October 1945, scrapped on slip
Dirk	G02	Scotts Shipbuilding & Engineering Company, Greenock	not laid down	not launched	not completed	Cancelled 15 October 1945
Grenade	G53	Scotts Shipbuilding & Engineering Company, Greenock	not laid down	not launched	not completed	Cancelled 22 November 1944
Halberd	G99	Scotts Shipbuilding & Engineering Company, Greenock	not laid down	not launched	not completed	Cancelled 22 November 1944
Poniard	G06	Scotts Shipbuilding & Engineering Company, Greenock	not laid down	not launched	not completed	Cancelled 22 November 1944
Rifle	G21	William Denny & Brothers, Dumbarton	30 June 1944	not launched	not completed	Cancelled 27 December 1945, scrapped on slip
Spear	G30	William Denny & Brothers, Dumbarton	29 September 1944	not launched	not completed	Cancelled 27 December 1945, scrapped on slip

- Admiral of the Fleet Viscount Cunningham remarked about his sadness at the loss of a ship named Scorpion—his first command had been HMS Scorpion (1910)—following the transfer of S-class destroyer HMS Scorpion (G72) to the Royal Netherlands Navy. A medieval form of ballista bore this name, making it suitable for the Weapon class, so the Admiralty ship names committee renamed HMS Tomahawk as Scorpion.
