= Jeremy de Halpert =

Royal Navy admiral

Rear Admiral Sir Jeremy de Halpert KCVO CB
- Born: 9 July 1947 (age 79); Lancashire, England
- Military career
- Allegiance: United Kingdom
- Branch: Royal Navy
- Service years: 1966–2002
- Rank: Rear Admiral
- Commands: Flag Officer Sea Training; HMS Campbeltown; HMS Apollo; HMS Sheraton
- Conflicts: Falklands War
- Awards: Knight Commander of the Royal Victorian Order; Companion of the Order of the Bath

Rear Admiral Sir Jeremy Michael de Halpert, KCVO, CB (born 9 July 1947) is a former senior Royal Navy officer who served as Naval Secretary from 1998 until his retirement in 2002.

== Naval career ==
Educated at Canford School and the Britannia Royal Naval College, de Halpert was commissioned as a sub-lieutenant in the Royal Navy in 1966. He was given command of the minesweeper HMS Sheraton in 1975 and served in the Falklands War on board the destroyer HMS Bristol in 1982. Promoted to commander on 31 December 1984, he took command of the frigate HMS Apollo before further promotion to captain in 1990 and command of the frigate HMS Campbeltown.

De Halpert was appointed chief of staff to the flag officer, Surface Training at Portsmouth in 1992, Deputy UK National Military Representative to the Supreme Headquarters Allied Powers Europe in 1994 and Director of Overseas Military Activity at the Ministry of Defence in 1996 before taking up the post of Naval Secretary in 1998. He retired from military service in 2002.

== Civic career ==
In retirement Sir Jeremy was appointed Deputy Master before becoming Executive Chairman of the Corporation of Trinity House, the charitable body responsible for running lighthouses and maintaining navigation buoys around the United Kingdom, as well as other maritime matters.

De Halpert is Prime Warden-elect of the Shipwrights' Company for 2016–17, supporting Lord Mayor The Lord Mountevans, the first Shipwright since Sir Frank Alexander was Lord Mayor of London (1944–45).

== Family ==
Of Scottish descent, de Halpert is married to Jane née Fattorini (now styled Lady de Halpert).

Military offices
Preceded by Sir Fabian Malbon	Naval Secretary; 1998–2002	Succeeded by Mark Kerr
Civic offices
Preceded by Deputy Doug Barrow	Prime Warden Shipwright; 2016–present	Incumbent
