= Admiral Cook =

Admiral Cook may refer to:

- Francis A. Cook (1843–1916), U.S. Navy rear admiral
- James Dunbar Cook (1921–2007), British Royal Navy rear admiral

== See also ==
- Eric Longley-Cook (1898–1983), British Royal Navy vice admiral
- Admiral Cooke (disambiguation)
