= David Dunbar-Nasmith =

Royal Navy Rear Admiral (1921-1997)

Rear-Admiral David Dunbar-Nasmith CB DSC DL
- Born: 21 February 1921
- Died: 15 September 1997 (aged 76)
- Relatives: Admiral Sir Martin Dunbar-Nasmith (father)
- Military career
- Allegiance: United Kingdom
- Branch: Royal Navy
- Service years: 1939–1972
- Rank: Rear-Admiral
- Commands: HMS Haydon; HMS Peacock; HMS Moon; HMS Rowena; HMS Enard Bay; HMS Alert; HMS Berwick; 5th Frigate Squadron; Naval Secretary; Flag Officer Scotland and Northern Ireland
- Conflicts: World War II
- Awards: Companion of the Order of the Bath; Distinguished Service Cross

Rear-Admiral David Arthur Dunbar-Nasmith, CB, DSC, DL (21 February 1921 – 15 September 1997) was a former Royal Navy officer who became Naval Secretary.

== Naval career ==
Born the son of Admiral Martin Dunbar-Nasmith, Dunbar-Nasmith joined the Royal Navy as a midshipman in 1939. He served in World War II in the Atlantic and the Mediterranean before being given command of HMS Haydon and then HMS Peacock. After the war he commanded HMS Moon and then HMS Rowena before joining the staff of the Flag Officer, 1st Cruiser Squadron and then commanding HMS Enard Bay. He joined the staff of the Supreme Allied Commander Atlantic in 1952 and was then given command of the frigate HMS Alert in 1954. After promotion to captain on 30 June 1958, he joined the Headquarters of the Supreme Allied Commander Europe in 1958 and then became Commanding Officer of the frigate HMS Berwick as well as Captain of the 5th Frigate Squadron in 1961.

He was appointed Director of Defence Plans at the Ministry of Defence in 1963, Commodore, Amphibious Forces, Far East Fleet from May 1966 to July 1967. Next appointed as Naval Secretary in 1967 and finally Flag Officer, Scotland and Northern Ireland in 1970. He retired in August 1972.

In retirement he became Chairman of the Highlands and Islands Development Board. He was also Gentleman Usher of the Green Rod. He lived at Rothes in Moray.

== Family ==
He married Elizabeth Bowlby in 1951; they had two daughters and two sons. He died at home in Glen of Rothes, Moray on 15 September 1997 aged 76 and was buried at Kinloss Abbey. Elizabeth died on 8 September 2021, aged 94, in Winchester, Hampshire.

Military offices
Preceded by Gervaise Cooke	Naval Secretary; 1967–1970	Succeeded by Iwan Raikes
Preceded by Sir Ian McGeoch	Flag Officer, Scotland and Northern Ireland; 1970–1972	Succeeded by Martin Lucey
