= HMS Alert (K647) =

1946 Bay-class frigate of the Royal Navy

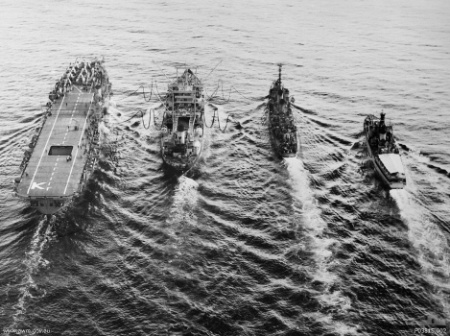
- Four Allied ships operating off Korea circa. 1951–1953 (l-r); HMAS Sydney, RFA Wave Premier, USS Nicholas and Alert.

History

United Kingdom
- Name: HMS Alert
- Builder: Blyth Dry Dock Company, Blyth, Northumberland
- Laid down: 28 July 1944
- Launched: 10 July 1945
- Completed: 24 October 1946
- Commissioned: October 1946
- Decommissioned: May 1964
- Identification: Pennant number K647
- Honours and awards: Korea 1951
- Fate: Sold for scrap, October 1971
- Badge: On a Field Gold, on a mount Green a stag at gaze Proper.

General characteristics
- Class & type: Bay-class frigate
- Displacement: 1,600 long tons (1,626 t) standard; 2,530 long tons (2,571 t) full
- Length: 286 ft (87 m) p/p; 307 ft 3 in (93.65 m) o/a
- Beam: 38 ft 6 in (11.73 m)
- Draught: 12 ft 9 in (3.89 m)
- Propulsion: 2 × Admiralty 3-drum boilers, 2 shafts, 4-cylinder vertical triple expansion reciprocating engines, 5,500 ihp (4,100 kW)
- Speed: 19.5 knots (36.1 km/h; 22.4 mph)
- Range: 724 tons oil fuel, 9,500 nmi (17,600 km) at 12 knots (22 km/h)
- Complement: 160
- Armament: 2 × QF 4 inch Mark XVI guns on twin mounting HA/LA Mk.XIX; 4 × 20 mm Oerlikon A/A on 2 twin mounts Mk.V; 1 × Hedgehog 24 barrel anti-submarine mortar; 2 rails and 4 throwers for 50 depth charges

HMS Alert a Bay-class frigate of the Royal Navy. She was originally laid down as the Loch-class vessel Loch Scamdale, and re-ordered as Dundrum Bay while building. She was completed as Alert, an Admiralty Yacht for command and gunboat diplomacy duties in the Mediterranean and Far Eastern stations.

Alert was sold to be broken up for scrap in October 1971.

== Service history ==
Alert was commissioned for service on 24 October 1946, and arrived at Singapore, her home port, on 29 November, to join the British Pacific Fleet. She spent the next 18 years carrying out an extensive series of visits to ports in China, Japan, Malaya, Vietnam, Borneo, and the Philippines, as well as being deployed operationally as a frigate in support of anti-insurgent operations during the Malayan Emergency, and taking part in various joint and multi-national fleet exercises.

In late 1951 Alert was temporarily deployed with United Nations Task Group to carry out naval fire support operations off the west coast of Korea.

In October 1952 she sailed to the north-west coast of Western Australia to take part in "Operation Hurricane", the first British atom bomb test. Later, in April 1957 she sailed to Christmas Island as part of "Operation Grapple", Britain's first thermonuclear bomb tests.

Between 1954 and 1956 she was commanded by Lieutenant Commander David Dunbar-Nasmith.

In 1958 she visited Japan, attending celebrations marking of 338th anniversary of the foundation of the Japanese Navy by William Adams, the English sailor who, after being shipwrecked in Japan, was credited with introducing western principles of shipbuilding.

Alert finally returned to the UK, arriving at Plymouth on 18 May 1964, and was laid up in the Reserve Fleet. In 1971 she was placed on the Disposal List, sold to BISCO for demolition by Thos. W. Ward at Inverkeithing, and was towed to the breaker's yard in October.

== Publications ==
- Colledge, J. J.; Warlow, Ben (2006) [1969]. Ships of the Royal Navy: The Complete Record of All Fighting Ships of the Royal Navy from the 15th Century to the Present (3rd Rev ed.). London: Chatham Publishing. ISBN 978-1-86176-281-8. OCLC 67375475.
- H.M.S. Alert 1963–1964. Commissioning Book (1964). No publisher, No ISBN.
