= Andrew Rose =

British admiral

Rear Admiral Andrew Rose OBE
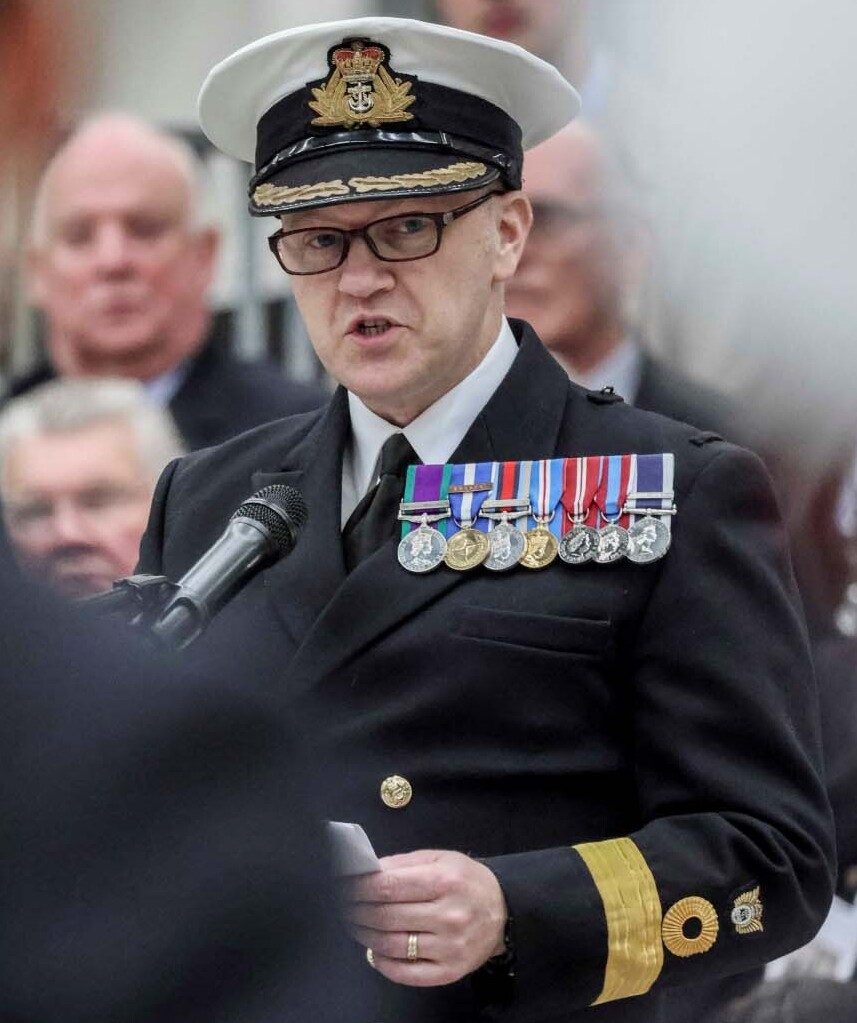
- Commodore Andrew Rose in 2022
- Military career
- Allegiance: United Kingdom
- Branch: Royal Navy
- Rank: Rear Admiral
- Commands: Naval Secretary
- Conflicts: War in Afghanistan
- Awards: Officer of the Order of the British Empire

Rear Admiral Andrew Donald Rose, OBE is a senior Royal Navy officer, who current serves as Naval Secretary.

== Naval career ==
Rose was commissioned into the Royal Navy and was initially trained to serve in an airborne early warning and control role. He became officer commanding 849 Naval Air Squadron in July 2012 and was deployed in that role to Afghanistan. Promoted to captain, he became Senior Advisor at the Afghanistan Ministry of Interior in 2017, Chief of Staff to the Commander United Kingdom Maritime Forces in 2018 and Deputy Commander Combined Task Force 151 in June 2019. After that he was appointed deputy assistant chief of staff at Permanent Joint Headquarters in December 2019, Deputy Director Plans at Navy Command Headquarters in January 2022. He was appointed Naval Secretary in January 2026, and promoted to rear admiral on 6 January 2026.

He was appointed an Officer of the Order of the British Empire (OBE) in the 2022 Birthday Honours.

Military offices
Preceded by Jude Terry	Naval Secretary; 2026–Present	Incumbent
