= HMS Leopard (F14) =

1958 Leopard-class anti-aircraft frigate of the British Royal Navy

History

United Kingdom
- Name: HMS Leopard (F14)
- Namesake: Leopard
- Ordered: 21 August 1951
- Builder: HM Dockyard, Portsmouth
- Laid down: 25 March 1953
- Launched: 23 May 1955
- Commissioned: 30 September 1958
- Decommissioned: 12 December 1975
- Fate: Scrapped 1977

General characteristics
- Class & type: Leopard-class frigate
- Length: 101 metres (331 ft)
- Beam: 10.6 metres (35 ft)
- Draught: 3 metres (9.8 ft)
- Propulsion: 8 × Admiralty Standard Range ASR1 diesels, 14,400 shp (10,738 kW), 2 shafts
- Speed: 22 knots (41 km/h; 25 mph)
- Range: 7,400 miles (11,900 km) at 18 kn
- Complement: 200 (22 officers)
- Sensors & processing systems: Radar System: Surface/Air search: Type 960; Air search: Type 965 AKE-1; Type 293/993 target indication radar; Navigation: Type 974 /978; Fire control: Type 275 on director Mark 6M; Sonar system: Type 174 search sonar; Type 164 attack sonar
- Armament: 2 × twin 4.5 in guns Mark 6; 1 × twin 40 mm Bofors gun STAAG Mark 2; 1 × single 40 mm Bofors gun Mark 9; 1 × Squid A/S mortar

HMS Leopard (F14), was a Leopard-class Type 41 anti aircraft frigate of the British Royal Navy, named after the leopard.

== Construction and design ==
The Leopard-class, or Type 41, frigates were designed for a main role of providing anti-aircraft protection for convoys. As such they were provided with a heavy gun armament but did not require high speed. They shared a common hull and machinery with the Salisbury-class (or Type 61) aircraft direction frigates.

Leopard was 339 ft 10 1/2 in (103.59 m) long overall, 330 ft 0 in (100.58 m) at the waterline and 320 ft 0 in (97.54 m), with a beam of 40 ft 0 in (12.19 m) and a draught of 11 ft 10 in (3.61 m). Displacement was 2,300 long tons (2,300 t) standard and 2,520 long tons (2,560 t) deep load. She was powered by eight Admiralty Standard Range 1 (ASR1) diesel engines, with a total power of 14,400 brake horsepower (10,700 kW), driving two propeller shafts giving a speed of 25 knots (46 km/h; 29 mph). Four more of these engines were used to generate electricity, driving 500 kW alternators. The ship had a range of 2,300 nmi (2,600 mi; 4,300 km) at full power and 7,500 nmi (8,600 mi; 13,900 km) at 16 kn (18 mph; 30 km/h).

The ship's main gun armament consisted of two twin 4.5 inch (113 mm) Mark 6 dual-purpose gun turrets, mounted one forward and one aft, with a STAAG twin stabilised 40mm Bofors mount providing close-in anti-aircraft defence, although this mounting was unreliable and later replaced by a single Bofors gun. A single Squid anti submarine mortar was fitted. As built, Leopard was fitted with a Type 960 long-range radar on the ship's mainmast and Type 293Q surface/air search radar on the foremast. A Mark 6M fire control system (including a Type 275 radar) for the 4.5 inch guns was mounted above the ship's bridge, with a secondary CRBF (Close-Range Blind Fire) director aft, fitted with Type 262 Radar, while the STAAG mount was fitted with its own Type 262 fire control radar. while a Type 974 navigation radar was also fitted. Type 965 long-range air search radar replaced Type 960 during a refit in 1964 and 1966, with Type 993 surface/air search and target indication radar replaced the Type 293Q. The ship's sonar fit consisted of Type 174 search, Type 170 fire control sonar for Squid and a Type 162 sonar for classifying targets on the sea floor.

Leopard was laid down at Portsmouth dockyard on 25 March 1953, was launched on 23 May 1955 and commissioned on 30 September 1958. Cost was £3,545,000.

== Service ==
The ship, first commanded by Commander R.G. Gaunt, was to serve in the South Atlantic and South America upon commission, as part of the 7th Frigate Squadron. In 1960 she sailed 1,144 miles up the River Amazon to Godajas. In 1961, Leopard sailed for the island of Tristan da Cunha after a volcanic eruption. Her crew assisted in the relief effort, as well as the recovery of personal belongings left behind by the island's inhabitants.

In 1963, Leopard suffered serious damage when she collided with the South African minesweeper Pietermaritzburg during exercises off Cape Point. One man was killed, and Leopard put into Simonstown for temporary repairs before returning to Portsmouth for more permanent repairs. In February 1966 she commissioned for the fourth time and in August 1966 sailed for the Far East where she spent a busy year of exercises. During the period 1967 to 1968 she was commanded by N R D King who later achieved flag rank. In 1968, she was diverted to Bermuda in response to civil unrest. In the same year she took part in Portsmouth 'Navy Days' and completed her fourth commission in that year.

During Britain's fishing dispute with Iceland in 1973, Leopard was accused by Iceland of threatening to fire on the patrol ship Ægir. The British government denied the claims, accusing the Icelandic ship of trying to cut the trawling wires of the German fishing vessels Teutonia and Düsseldorf, and of firing several shots. The government further stated that Leopard had only warned the Ægir that she would fire back if more shots were fired. Leopard provided further support for British trawlers during another fishing dispute with Iceland in 1975, spending a single week on patrol.

She was scrapped at Dartford in 1977.

== Publications ==
- Blackman, Raymond V.B. (1971). Jane's Fighting Ships 1971–72. London: Sampson Low, Marston & Co., Ltd.
- Colledge, J. J.; Warlow, Ben (2006) [1969]. Ships of the Royal Navy: The Complete Record of All Fighting Ships of the Royal Navy from the 15th Century to the Present (3rd Rev ed.). London: Chatham Publishing. ISBN 978-1-86176-281-8. OCLC 67375475.
- Critchley, Mike (1992). British Warships Since 1945: Part 5: Frigates. Liskeard, UK: Maritime Press. ISBN 0-907771-13-0.
- Friedman, Norman (2008). British Destroyers & Frigates: The Second World War and After. Barnsley, UK: Seaforth Publishing. ISBN 978-1-84832-015-4.
- Gardiner, Robert; Chumbley, Stephen, eds. (1995). Conway's All The World's Fighting Ships 1947–1995. Annapolis, Maryland, USA: Naval Institute Press. ISBN 1-55750-132-7.
- Marriott, Leo (1983). Royal Navy Frigates 1945–1983. Shepperton, Surrey, UK: Ian Allan Ltd. ISBN 0-7110-1322-5.
