= HMS A4 =

Submarine of the Royal Navy

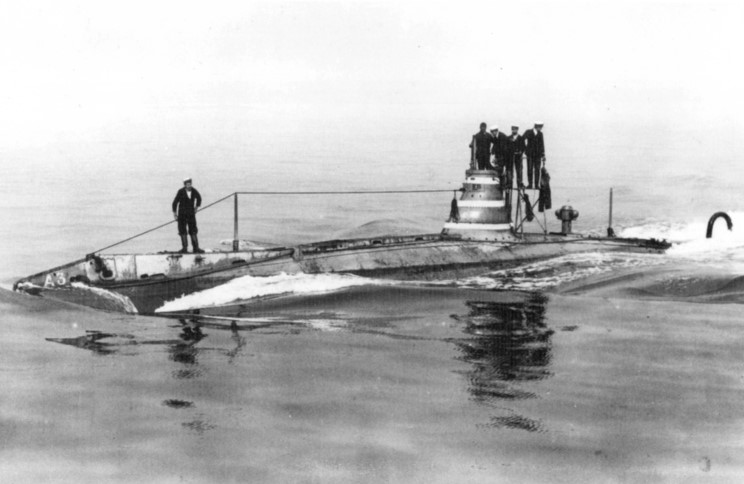
- HMS A3

History

United Kingdom
- Name: HMS A4
- Builder: Vickers, Barrow-in-Furness
- Laid down: 19 February 1902
- Launched: 9 June 1903
- Commissioned: 17 July 1904
- Fate: Sold for scrapping 16 January 1920

General characteristics
- Class & type: A-class submarine
- Displacement: 190 tons surfaced, 207 tons submerged
- Length: 105.25 ft (32.08 m)
- Beam: 12.75 ft (3.89 m)
- Complement: 11 (2 officers and 9 ratings)
- Armament: 2 × 18 inch (450 mm) torpedo tubes, plus two reloads

HMS A4 was an early Royal Navy submarine.

She was a member of the first British A class of submarines. Like all her class, she was built at Vickers, Barrow-in-Furness.

== Service history ==
A4 suffered a serious accident, although without casualties, on 16 October 1905 during an underwater signalling experiment off Spithead.

A bell had been lowered into the water from a dinghy some distance away from the submarine was being used to signal to the submarine, which was running awash. A flag on a boat hook protruding through a ventilator which had been left open was used to indicate that the signal had been heard. The experiment had been performed successfully on the previous day, but the sea was much rougher on 16 October and consequently the submarine stayed inside the breakwater.

The same trim settings had been used as on the previous day, but as there was fresh water flowing into the harbour, the water was less dense and so the submarine was less buoyant than on the previous day.

Seawater flooded through the ventilator causing the boat to develop a 40 degree inclination on the bow and dive to 90 feet (27 m) and also partially filling her with chlorine gas when it came in contact with the battery acid. The crew managed to blow the ballast tanks to surface the boat and evacuate onto the deck, but there was an explosion whilst she was being towed back to port and she slowly sank. The boat was salvaged and repaired. The captain of the submarine at the time, Lieutenant Martin Nasmith, was later awarded the Victoria Cross for his command of HMS E11 during the Dardanelles campaign in 1915.

During the First World War she was used for training at Portsmouth, and was sold for scrap on 16 January 1920.

== Bibliography ==
- Royal Navy Submarine museum
- Hepper, David (2006). British Warship Losses in the Ironclad Era, 1860–1919. Chatham Publishing. ISBN 978-1-861762-73-3.
