= Norman King (Royal Navy officer) =

Vice-Admiral Sir Norman King KBE
- Born: Norman Ross Dutton King; 19 March 1933
- Died: 6 March 2013 (aged 79)
- Military career
- Allegiance: United Kingdom
- Branch: Royal Navy
- Rank: Vice-Admiral
- Commands: HMS Leopard; HMS Newcastle
- Awards: Knight Commander of the Order of the British Empire

Vice-Admiral Sir Norman Ross Dutton King KBE (19 March 1933 – 6 March 2013) was a Royal Navy officer who became Naval Secretary.

== Naval career ==
Born the son of Sir Norman King KCMG (former British Consul in Dar es Salaam) and educated at Fonthill School and the Royal Naval College, Dartmouth, King was given command of the frigate HMS Leopard in 1967. He went on to be Naval Assistant to the Second Sea Lord in 1975 and to command the destroyer HMS Newcastle in 1979. He was appointed Director of Naval Officer Appointments in 1983 and Naval Attaché in Washington D. C. in 1987. He became Naval Secretary in 1987 and Chief of Staff to the Commander Allied Naval Forces Southern Europe in 1988, with the promotion to vice admiral on 10 March 1988, before retiring in 1991.

In retirement he became Chairman of the Buckinghamshire Area Health Authority. He died on 6 March 2013.

== Family ==
In 1967 he married Patricia Rosemary Furber; they have two daughters, Annabelle and Melissa.

Military offices
Preceded by Roger Dimmock	Naval Secretary; 1987–1988	Succeeded by David Dobson
