= Martin Dunbar-Nasmith =

Royal Navy admiral (1883–1965)

Admiral Sir Martin Dunbar-Nasmith VC KCB KCMG
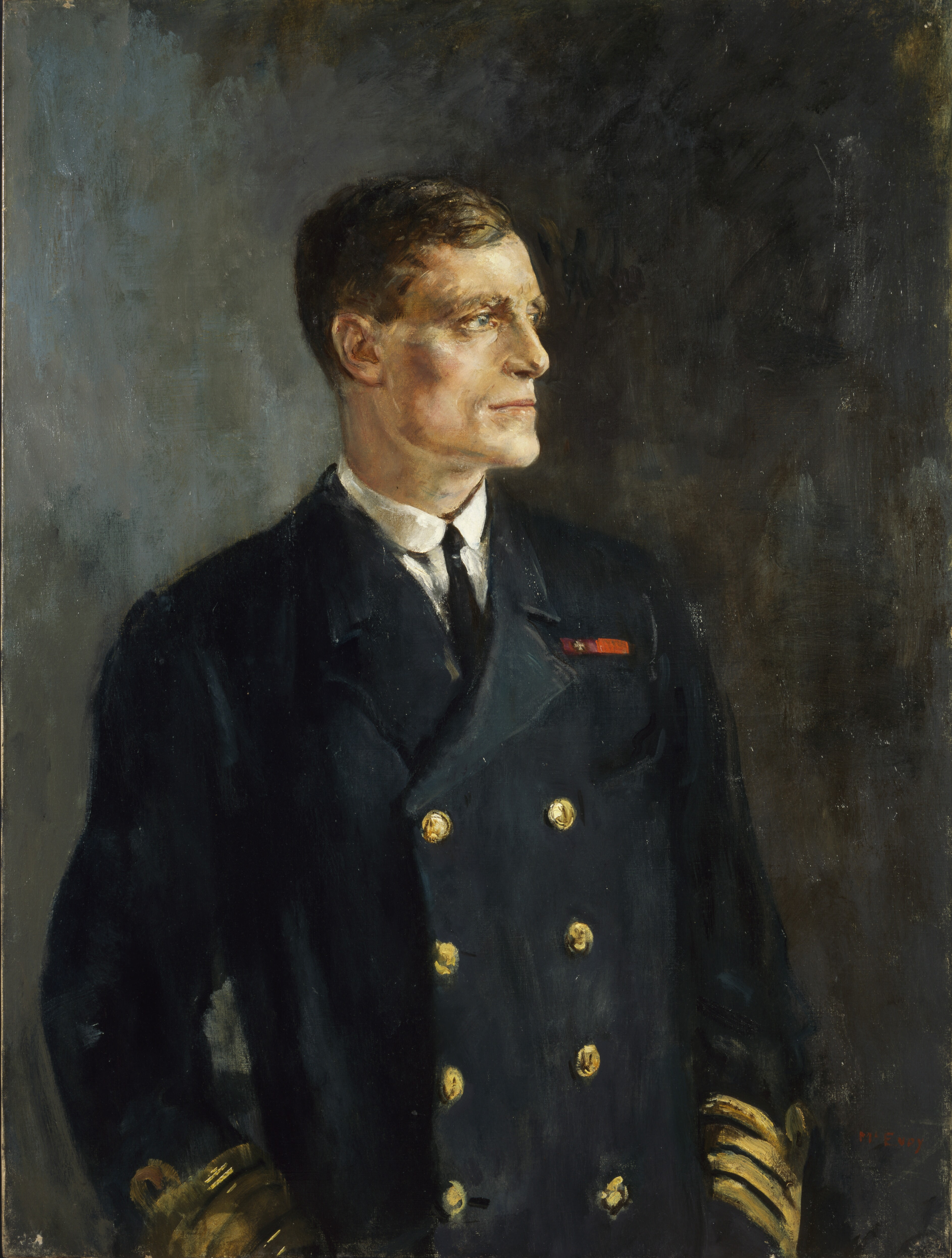
- Captain Martin Eric Nasmith by Ambrose McEvoy
- Born: 1 April 1883; Barnes, Surrey, England
- Died: 29 June 1965 (aged 82); Elgin, Moray, Scotland
- Burial place: Elgin Cemetery, Linkwood Road, New Elgin
- Relatives: Sir James Dunbar-Nasmith (son); Rear Admiral David Dunbar-Nasmith (son)
- Military career
- Allegiance: United Kingdom
- Branch: Royal Navy
- Service years: 1898–1946
- Rank: Admiral
- Commands: Flag Officer-In-Charge, London (1942–45); Western Approaches Command (1939–41); Plymouth Command (1938–41); Commander-in-Chief, East Indies (1932–35); HMS Iron Duke (1921–23); HMS Ambrose (1917–18); HMS Vulcan (1917); HMS J4 (1916–17); HMS E11 (1914–16); HMS Arrogant (1912–14); HMS D4 (1911–12); HMS C7 (1907–08); HMS A4 (1905)
- Conflicts: First World War; Russian Civil War; Second World War: Operation Aerial
- Awards: Victoria Cross; Knight Commander of the Order of the Bath; Knight Commander of the Order of St Michael and St George; Order of St. Olav (Norway); Polonia Restituta (Poland); Legion of Honour (France); Order of Orange Nassau (Netherlands); Croix de Guerre (France); Cross of Liberty II/2 (Estonia)
- Other work: Vice Chairman Imperial War Graves Commission (1948–54); Deputy Lieutenant and Vice-Lord Lieutenant Morayshire; Vice-Admiral of the United Kingdom (1954–62)

Admiral Sir Martin Eric Dunbar-Nasmith (1 April 1883 – 29 June 1965) was a Royal Navy officer and a recipient of the Victoria Cross, the highest award for gallantry in the face of the enemy that can be awarded to British and Commonwealth forces. He was born Martin Eric Nasmith, adding "Dunbar" to his surname in 1923.

== Early life and education ==
Nasmith was born on 1 April 1883 at 136 Castelnau in Barnes, which was then in the county of Surrey and is now in the London Borough of Richmond upon Thames.

== Early career ==
Educated at Eastman's Royal Naval Academy in Winchester and HMS Britannia at Dartmouth, Nasmith joined the Royal Navy in 1898.

On 8 May 1912, King George V was in HMY Victoria and Albert in Weymouth Bay to witness Fleet manoeuvres. Because of heavy fog, the programme was disrupted, and the King expressed the desire to dive in a submarine. He embarked on HM Submarine D4, under then Lieutenant Nasmith's command, and (in the words of The Times of 10 May) "made a lengthy run in her when she was submerged." What made the occasion all the more remarkable was the presence on board of his second son, Prince Albert, who was to become King George VI, of Winston Churchill (First Lord of the Admiralty and future prime minister), and of then Captain Roger Keyes, Inspecting Captain of Submarines, who was to become the first Director of Combined Operations (the Commandos) in the early part of the Second World War.

A former prime minister, Arthur Balfour, was also embarked, but the then prime minister, H. H. Asquith, who had been with the King's party earlier in the day, had had to return to London on urgent business and did not dive in D4. Nasmith's diary records that: "We remained under water for ten to 15 minutes, during which time he showed great interest in the proceedings, periscope in particular."

A Navy News article from July 2012 by Commander William Corbett (at whose parents' wedding Nasmith had proposed the toast to the health of the bride and groom), records that Nasmith often wondered what would have happened to the course of 20th century history had he sunk that day, a not unreasonable thought, given that he had very nearly sunk in the Solent in 1905 whilst in command of HM Submarine A4.

== First World War ==
Dunbar-Nasmith was 32 years old, and a lieutenant commander during the First World War, when the following actions took place for which he was awarded the VC.

During the period 20 May – 8 June 1915 in the Sea of Marmara, Dardanelles, Turkey, Lieutenant-Commander Nasmith, in command of H.M. Submarine E.11, destroyed one large Turkish gunboat, two transports, one ammunition ship, three store ships and four other vessels.

When he had safely passed the most difficult part of his homeward journey he received information that a cargo of coal was heading towards Istanbul from the Black Sea. Realising that coal was essential for the morale of the besieged city, Nasmith turned back.

When the coal-carrying ship came into sight of the docks, a welcoming committee of municipal grandees soon formed, along with a happy crowd – water, electricity and rail transport had all suffered due to a lack of coal. Hardly had the ship berthed than it mysteriously blew up before the eyes of the astounded crowd. Nasmith successfully slipped out again.

Nasmith conducted combat operations in the Sea of Marmara for a three-month period. When his torpedoes ran low, he set them to float at the end of their run, so that he could recover them should they fail to hit a target. At one point, he captured a sailing dhow, and lashed it to the conning tower of E11 as camouflage, and went on to capture an ammunition ship using small arms. His penetration of the Golden Horn was the first time an enemy ship had done so in over 500 years. He also attacked a railway viaduct.

Nasmith's first lieutenant, Guy D'Oyly-Hughes, and second lieutenant, Robert Brown, were awarded the Distinguished Service Cross, and all the rest of the crew were awarded the Distinguished Service Medal. Nasmith was promoted to commander immediately and to captain a year later.

== Later naval career ==
Later in the war, Nasmith was in charge of the Seventh Submarine Flotilla in the Baltic and Senior Naval Officer at Reval (later Tallinn), and was appointed CB in 1920 for that service. He was captain of HMS Iron Duke from 1921 to 1923.

He was appointed Commandant of the Royal Naval College, Dartmouth, in 1926 and then became Rear Admiral Submarines in 1929. He became Commander-in-Chief, East Indies in 1932 and Second Sea Lord and Chief of Naval Personnel in 1935. He was Commander-in-Chief, Plymouth from 1938 and then Commander-in-Chief of Plymouth and Western Approaches Command from the outbreak of war in September 1939. He served as Flag Officer-in-Charge, London from 1942 and retired in 1946. Before retiring in 1946 Nasmith moved to Rothes in Scotland living out the remainder of his days in the town.

In retirement he became Vice Chairman of the Imperial War Graves Commission. He was also appointed Vice-Admiral of the United Kingdom, a ceremonial position.

He died in Rothes in 1965, aged 82.

== Family ==
In 1920 he married Beatrix Justina Dunbar-Dunbar-Rivers; they had two sons (Rear-Admiral David Dunbar-Nasmith and the architect Professor Sir James Dunbar-Nasmith) and a daughter.

== Legacy ==
On 11 April 2015, a blue plaque was unveiled at his birthplace in Barnes.

On 25 June 2015, the Rothes community hosted a ceremony for the unveiling of a commemorative Victoria Cross paving stone at Rothes's war memorial.

== Sources ==
- Hough, Richard (2001). The Great War at Sea: 1914–1918. Birlinn. ISBN 1841580538.

Military offices
Preceded by Henry Grace	Rear-Admiral Submarines; 1929–1931	Succeeded by Charles Little
Preceded by Sir Eric Fullerton	Commander-in-Chief, East Indies Station; 1932–1934	Succeeded by Sir Frank Rose
Preceded by Sir Dudley Pound	Second Sea Lord; 1935–1938	Succeeded by Sir Charles Little
Preceded by Sir Reginald Plunkett	Commander-in-Chief, Plymouth; 1938–1941	Succeeded by Sir Charles Forbes
Honorary titles
Preceded by Sir Montague Browning	Vice-Admiral of the United Kingdom; 1945–1962	Succeeded by Sir John Edelsten
