= Jude Terry (Royal Navy officer) =

Royal Navy Rear Admiral (born 1973)

Rear Admiral Jude Terry CB OBE
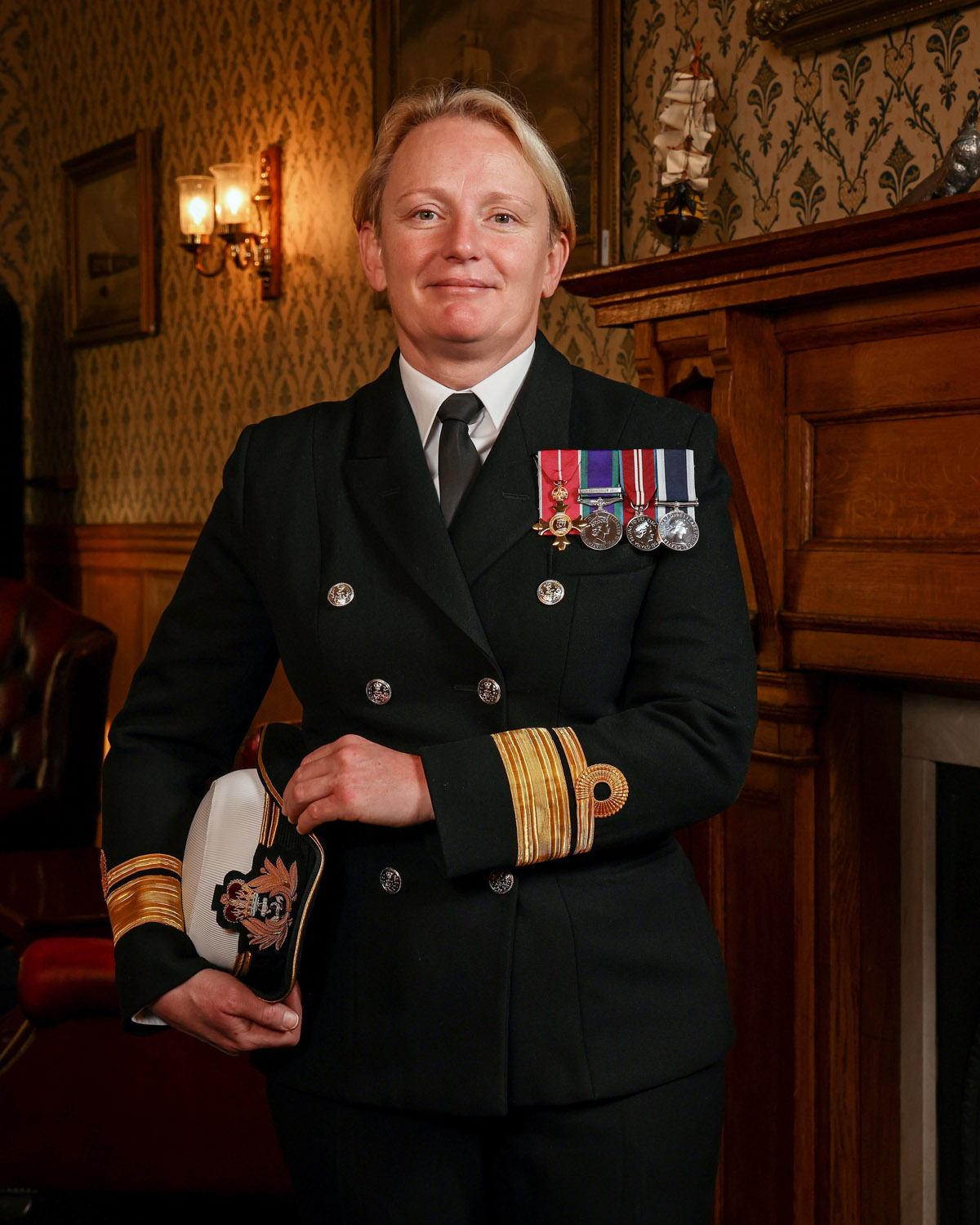
- Rear Admiral Terry in 2022
- Born: 17 September 1973 (age 53); Jersey
- Alma mater: University of Dundee; King's College London
- Spouse: Noel Charlton (m. 2009–2012)
- Military career
- Allegiance: United Kingdom
- Branch: Royal Navy
- Service years: 1997–present
- Rank: Rear Admiral
- Awards: Companion of the Order of the Bath; Officer of the Order of the British Empire

Rear Admiral Judith Helen Terry CB OBE (born 17 September 1973) is a senior Royal Navy officer. In May 2021, it was announced that she would be promoted to rear admiral in 2022, thereby becoming the first woman to hold non-honorary flag rank in the Royal Navy. She became Naval Secretary and Director of People and Training.

== Personal life ==
Terry was born in Jersey in 1973. She was educated at Jersey College for Girls, a fee-paying school on the island. She studied anatomical sciences at the University of Dundee, graduating with a Bachelor of Science (BSc) degree in 1997. She later studied at King's College London, graduating with a Master of Arts (MA) degree in defence studies in 2012.

== Naval career ==
Terry was commissioned into the Royal Navy on 17 September 1997. She trained and served as a logistics and supply officer. She was promoted to commander on 30 June 2014. She has served on the survey vessel HMS Scott, and as head of logistics on HMS Ocean, the United Kingdom's helicopter carrier. She served for three years at Permanent Joint Headquarters, for which she was appointed an Officer of the Order of the British Empire (OBE) in the 2017 New Year Honours.

Terry was promoted to commodore on 8 March 2021. She then served as Deputy Director People at Navy Command. She was promoted to rear admiral on 12 January 2022, becoming the first woman to hold that rank in the Royal Navy. In January 2022, she was appointed Director People and Training and Naval Secretary.

Terry was appointed a Companion of the Order of the Bath (CB) in the 2025 New Year Honours.

== See also ==
- List of senior female officers of the British Armed Forces

Military offices
Preceded by Philip Hally	Naval Secretary; 2022–2026	Succeeded by Andrew Rose
