= Mark Kerr (Royal Navy officer, born 1949) =

Royal Navy Rear Admiral (born 18 February 1949)

Rear Admiral Mark Kerr DL
- Born: 18 February 1949 (age 77); Malta
- Military career
- Allegiance: United Kingdom
- Branch: Royal Navy
- Service years: 1967–2004
- Rank: Rear Admiral
- Commands: Britannia Royal Naval College; HMS Cumberland; HMS Broadsword; HMS Beachampton; HMS Alert
- Conflicts: Operation Banner

Rear Admiral Mark William Graham Kerr (born 18 February 1949) is a former Royal Navy officer who went on to be Chief Executive of Powys County Council.

== Naval career ==
Kerr joined the Royal Navy in 1967, aged 18. He was given command of the patrol boat HMS Alert in waters off Northern Ireland in 1976 and the minesweeper HMS Beachampton in waters off Hong Kong in 1982. After a period with the Schools Presentation Team and then as executive officer on a larger ship, he was given command of the frigate HMS Broadsword in 1988 and the frigate HMS Cumberland in 1994. He was appointed Deputy Flag Officer, Sea Training in 1997, Commodore of the Royal Naval College, Dartmouth in 1999 and Naval Secretary in 2002. He retired in 2004.

== Later life ==
In retirement he became Chief Executive of Powys County Council in May 2004 and interim Director of the National Botanic Garden of Wales in October 2009.

== Personal life ==
He lives in Llangors, Powys, with his wife, Louisa. They have two sons and a daughter.

Military offices
Preceded by Jeremy de Halpert	Naval Secretary; 2002–2004	Succeeded by Peter Wilkinson
