= HMS Scorpion (D64) =

Weapon-class destroyer

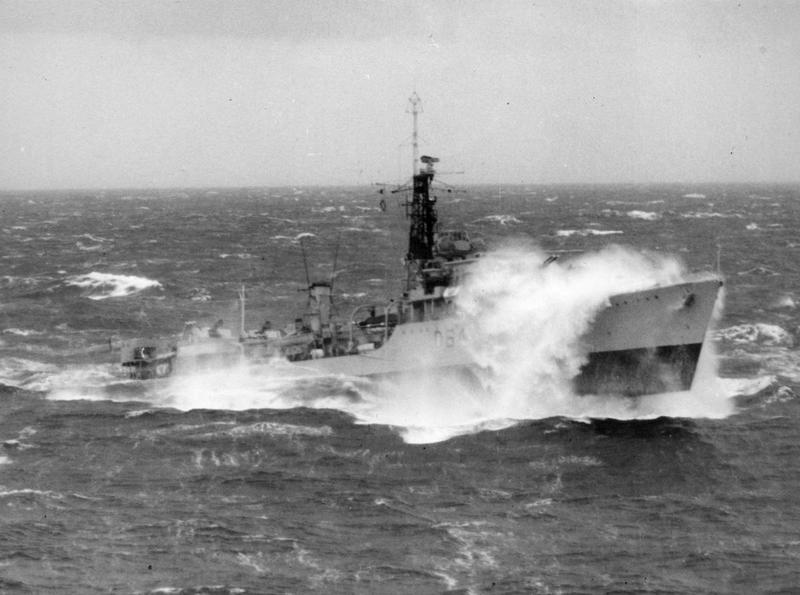
- HMS Scorpion lifts her nose out of the water while operating in heavy Northern waters during Exercise Mariner, September 1953 (IWM)

History

United Kingdom
- Name: HMS Scorpion
- Ordered: 3 February 1943
- Builder: J. S. White, Cowes
- Laid down: 16 December 1944
- Launched: 15 August 1946
- Completed: 17 September 1947
- Decommissioned: April 1963
- Identification: Pennant number D64
- Fate: Sold out of service on 4 June 1971 to P. & W. MacLellan, arriving at Bo'ness on 17 June 1971 for scrapping

General characteristics
- Class & type: Weapon-class destroyer
- Displacement: 1,980 tons standard
- Length: 365 ft (111 m)
- Beam: 38 ft (12 m)
- Armament: 6 x 4-inch (102 mm) DP guns on twin Mk XIX mounts; 6 x 40 mm AA Bofors guns; 2 x Squid ASW Mortars; 10 x 21 inch (533 mm) torpedo tubes (removed after 1957)

HMS Scorpion was a Weapon-class destroyer of the British Royal Navy in service from 1947 and scrapped in 1971. Originally named Centaur, the ship was renamed Tomahawk and finally Scorpion (in September 1943) before her launch.

== Royal Navy service ==
On commissioning Scorpion was allocated to the 6th Destroyer Flotilla (later squadron) which was made up of the Weapon-class destroyers. In 1953 she took part in the Fleet Review to celebrate the Coronation of Elizabeth II. In 1954 Scorpion was the only Weapon-class ship fitted with the Limbo depth charge mortar, as a trial to modernise the whole class, replacing the older Squid mortar.

Following Home Service commissions she then undertook a commission in the Mediterranean during 1955 and 1956. After this she was placed in reserve.

In 1957 all of the Weapon-class Destroyers started conversions to radar pickets, which involved the removal of their torpedo tubes. Scorpion underwent her conversion at Devonport Dockyard. She was fitted with an extra mast to carry a large AKE-1 Antennae. She was the last Weapon-class vessel to re-commission in 1959 and was part of the 7th Destroyer Squadron until being placed in reserve in April 1963.

== Decommissioning and disposal ==
Following decommissioning Scorpion was used for underwater explosive trials at Rosyth. She was finally scrapped at Bo'ness in 1971.

== Publications ==
- Colledge, J. J.; Warlow, Ben (2006) [1969]. Ships of the Royal Navy: The Complete Record of All Fighting Ships of the Royal Navy from the 15th Century to the Present (3rd Rev ed.). London: Chatham Publishing. ISBN 978-1-86176-281-8. OCLC 67375475.
- Marriott, Leo (1989). Royal Navy Destroyers Since 1945. Ian Allan Ltd. ISBN 0-7110-1817-0.
