= HMS Broadsword (D31) =

Weapon-class destroyer

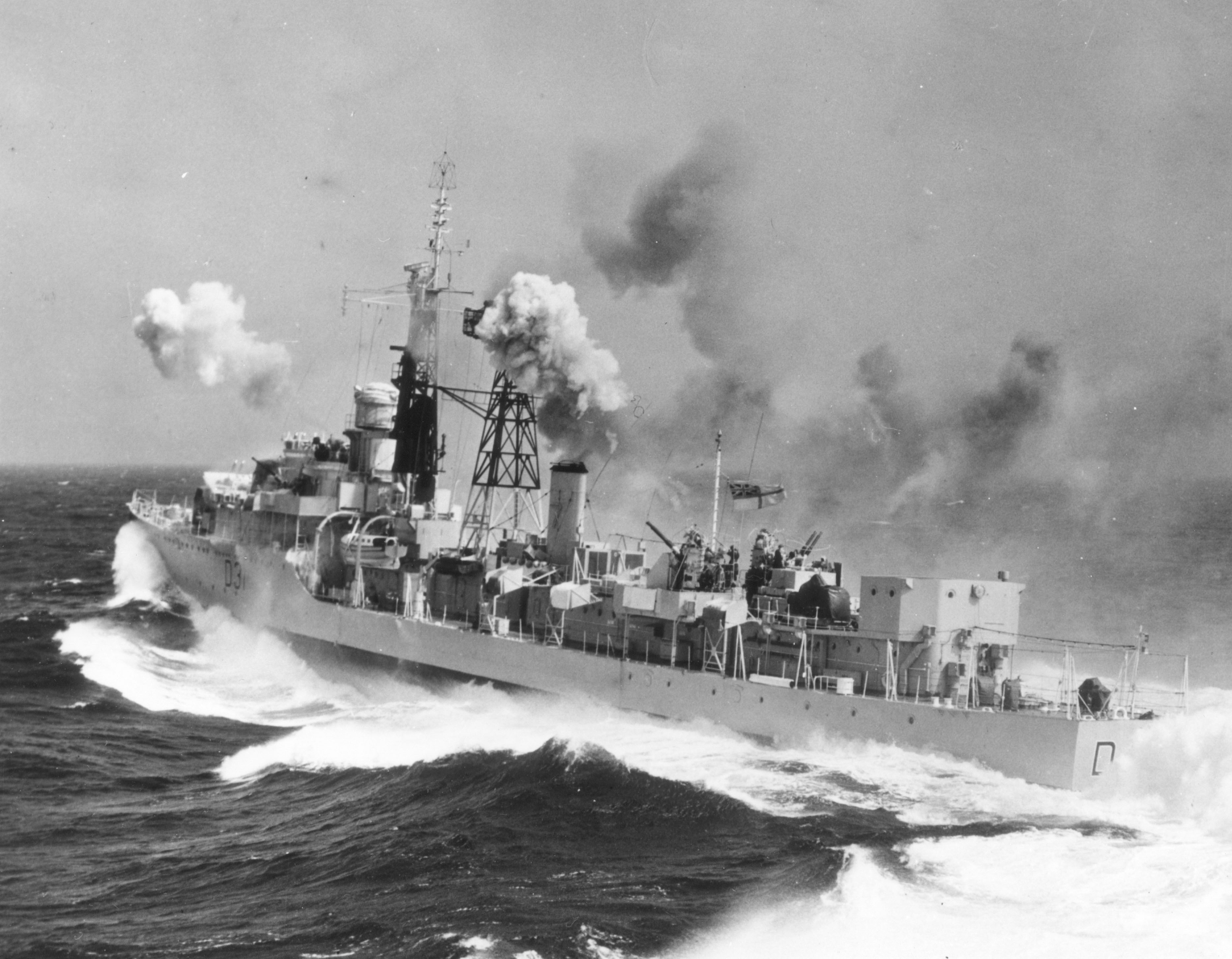
- HMS Broadsword (D31)

History

United Kingdom
- Name: HMS Broadsword
- Builder: Yarrow Shipbuilders
- Laid down: 20 July 1944
- Launched: 4 February 1946
- Completed: 4 October 1948
- Identification: Pennant number G31/D31
- Fate: Arrived at Inverkeithing for scrapping in October 1968

General characteristics
- Class & type: Weapon-class destroyer
- Displacement: 1,980 tons standard
- Length: 365 ft (111 m)
- Beam: 38 ft (12 m)
- Armament: 6 x 4-inch DP guns; 6 x Bofors 40 mm L/60 gun, 10 x 21 inch (533 mm) torpedo tubes; 2 x Squid ASW Mortars

HMS Broadsword was a Weapon-class destroyer of the British Royal Navy in service from 1948 and scrapped in 1968.

== Construction ==
Battleaxe was one of 19 Weapon-class destroyers ordered as part of the Royal Navy's 1943 War Programme. The Weapons were intended to be built in shipyards where the larger Battle class could not be built, but still mounting the heavy anti-aircraft armament and modern fire-control which war experience had shown to be necessary. As designed, the Weapons were to be armed by six 4-in guns in three twin turrets, two forward and one aft, with radar direction, with a close-in anti-aircraft armament of six 40-mm Bofors guns. Ten 21 inch (533 mm) torpedo tubes were carried in two quintuple mounts, while up to 150 depth charges could be carried.

Broadsword was ordered on 2 April 1943 and was laid down on at Yarrows Scotstoun shipyard in Glasgow on 20 July 1944 The end of the Second World War meant that most of the class were cancelled, with the remaining four ships, including Broadsword having their armament fit revised to improve their anti-submarine capability. One of the ships' four inch mounts (in Battleaxe's case the superimposed forward B-mount, leaving one turret forward and another aft) was removed to allow the fitting of two Squid anti-submarine mortars, while the conventional depth charge armament was also removed. Broadsword was launched on 5 February 1946 and completed on 4 October 1948.

The destroyer was 365 ft 0 in (111.25 m) long overall, 350 ft 0 in (106.68 m) at the waterline and 341 ft 6 in (104.09 m) between perpendiculars, with a beam of 38 ft 0 in (11.58 m) and a draught of 11 ft 9 in (3.58 m). Displacement was 1,980 long tons (2,010 t) standard and 2,850 long tons (2,900 t) full load. The ship's machinery was laid out in the unit arrangement, to minimise the potential for a single hit disabling the ship. Two Foster-Wheeler water-tube boiler fed steam at 430 psi (3,000 kPa) and 450 °F (232 °C) to two sets of Parsons geared steam rurbines. The machinery was rated at 40,000 shp (30,000 kW), giving a speed of 34 kn (39 mph; 63 km/h).

== Service ==
Broadsword commissioned on 17 September 1948 when she started trials. After completion, the destroyer underwent a period of defect rectification, with an electronics workshop being fitted at Chatham Dockyard from November–December 1948. Broadsword joined the 6th Destroyer Flotilla (later Squadron), as part of the Home Fleet, along with the other Weapon-class destroyers on 29 December 1948. On 25 March 1949, Broadsword accidentally fired one of her 4-inch guns while berthed at Portsmouth naval base. The shell passed over the city of Portsmouth and was believed to have landed in the sea. From September to December 1949, Broadsword was refitted at Chatham, and she had her sonar and electrical systems repaired at Portsmouth during April–May 1950. On 14 January 1951, a fire broke out aboard Broadsword and a rating was killed by smoke inhalation while trying to fight the fire, with a second seaman injured while trying to rescue the first man. In April 1953 Broadsword went into reserve at Chatham, being replaced in the 6th Destroyer Squadron by Comet. She transferred base from Chatham to Portsmouth in April 1955, remaining in reserve.

In 1957 all of the Weapon class were taken into refit and conversion to re-equip them as radar pickets, to supplement the new Salisbury-class frigates. Broadsword was converted at Rosyth. The conversion involved the removal of both sets of torpedo tubes and the erection of an additional lattice mast, which carried a large Type 965 Radar (AKE -1 aerial). She re-commissioned in October 1958 and was then allocated to the 7th Destroyer Squadron serving in Home and Mediterranean waters until paying off in 1963.

== Decommissioning and disposal ==
Following decommissioning Broadsword was towed on 25 April 1968 to Rosyth for use in target trials. She was scrapped at Inverkeithing, arriving there on 8 October 1968.

== In popular culture ==
Broadsword was featured on the Look at Life (film series) shown on BBC Four titled 'Britain on Film' Episode 2:6 Messing About on Boats. During the short clip, D31 is filmed from a trawler patrolling the fishing limits with Iceland at some time during the 1960s.

== Publications ==
- Colledge, J. J.; Warlow, Ben (2006) [1969]. Ships of the Royal Navy: The Complete Record of All Fighting Ships of the Royal Navy from the 15th Century to the Present (3rd Rev ed.). London: Chatham Publishing. ISBN 978-1-86176-281-8. OCLC 67375475.
- Critchley, Mike (1982). British Warships Since 1945: Part 3: Destroyers. Liskeard, UK: Maritime Books. ISBN 0-9506323-9-2.
- English, John (2008). Obdurate to Daring: British Fleet Destroyers 1941–1945. Windsor, UK: World Ship Society. ISBN 978-0-9560769-0-8.
- Friedman, Norman (2008). British Destroyers & Frigates: The Second World War and After. Barnsley, UK: Seaforth Publishing. ISBN 978-1-84832-015-4.
- Lenton, H. T. (1970). Navies of the Second World War: British Fleet and Escort Destroyers Volume Two. London: Macdonald & Co. (Publishers) Ltd. ISBN 0-356-03122-5.
- Marriott, Leo (1989). Royal Navy Destroyers Since 1945. Ian Allan Ltd. ISBN 0-7110-1817-0.
- Gardiner, Robert; Chesneau, Roger, eds. (1980). Conway's All the World's Fighting Ships 1922–1946. London: Conway Maritime Press. ISBN 0-85177-146-7.
- Whitley, M. J. (2000). Destroyers of the Second World War: An International Encyclopedia. London: Cassell & Co. ISBN 1-85409-521-8.
