= HMS Enard Bay =

1946 Bay-class anti-aircraft frigate of the Royal Navy

History

United Kingdom
- Name: HMS Enard Bay
- Builder: Smiths Dock Company, South Bank, Middlesbrough
- Laid down: 27 May 1944
- Launched: 31 October 1944
- Commissioned: 4 January 1946
- Decommissioned: January 1947 (not correct. should be later than mid 1954; possibly 1957)
- Identification: pennant number K435
- Fate: Sold for scrapping, 1957
- Badge: On a Field Green a fess wavy of six White and Blue charged with three roundels Black.

General characteristics
- Class & type: Bay-class frigate
- Displacement: 1,600 long tons (1,626 t) standard; 2,530 long tons (2,571 t) full
- Length: 286 ft (87 m) p/p; 307 ft 3 in (93.65 m) o/a
- Beam: 38 ft 6 in (11.73 m)
- Draught: 12 ft 9 in (3.89 m)
- Propulsion: 2 × Admiralty 3-drum boilers, 2 shafts, 4-cylinder vertical triple expansion reciprocating engines, 5,500 ihp (4,100 kW)
- Speed: 19.5 knots (36.1 km/h; 22.4 mph)
- Range: 724 tons oil fuel, 9,500 nmi (17,600 km) at 12 knots (22 km/h)
- Complement: 157
- Sensors & processing systems: Type 285 fire control radar; Type 291 air warning radar; Type 276 target indication radar; High Frequency Direction Finder (HF/DF); IFF transponder
- Armament: 4 × QF 4 inch Mark XVI guns on 2 twin mounting HA/LA Mk.XIX; 4 × 40 mm Bofors A/A on 2 twin mounts Mk.V; 4 × 20 mm Oerlikon A/A on 2 twin mounts Mk.V; 1 × Hedgehog 24 barrel A/S projector; 2 rails and 4 throwers for 50 depth charges

HMS Enard Bay was a Bay-class anti-aircraft frigate of the British Royal Navy, named for Enard Bay in Caithness.

The ship was originally ordered from the Smiths Dock Company of South Bank, Middlesbrough on 25 January 1943 as the Loch-class frigate Loch Bracadale, and laid down on 27 May 1944. However the contract was then changed, and the ship was completed to a revised design as a Bay-class anti-aircraft frigate, launched on 31 October 1944, and completed on 4 January 1946.

== Service history ==
After sea trials in December 1945 and January 1946, Enard Bay sailed for the Mediterranean joining the Escort Flotilla at Malta on 7 February. She was first deployed in the eastern Mediterranean for the interception of merchant ships carrying illegal Jewish immigrants to Palestine. In June she returned to Malta, and in August was guard ship at Trieste, returning to the eastern Mediterranean in September for further interception patrols off Haifa. In January 1947 she returned to the UK to decommission and was placed into Plymouth Reserve Fleet, where she was used as an accommodation ship. In 1953 she took part in the Fleet Review to celebrate the Coronation of Queen Elizabeth II.

Enard Bay was placed on the Disposal List in 1956, and sold to the British Iron & Steel Corporation (BISCO) for demolition by Shipbreaking Industries at Faslane, where she arrived in tow on 15 November 1957.

== Publications ==
- Colledge, J. J.; Warlow, Ben (2006) [1969]. Ships of the Royal Navy: The Complete Record of All Fighting Ships of the Royal Navy from the 15th Century to the Present (3rd Rev ed.). London: Chatham Publishing. ISBN 978-1-86176-281-8. OCLC 67375475.
