= Andrew Baker =

Andrew or Andy Baker may refer to:

- Andrew Baker (judge) (born 1965), British judge
- Andrew J. Baker, American astrophysicist
- Andy Baker (politician), New Zealand politician
- Andy Baker (national security advisor), deputy U.S. national security advisor
- Drew Baker (born 2002), English footballer
- Andy Baker, character on 13 Reasons Why
