= 2016 Special Honours =

British government recognitions

As part of the British honours system, Special Honours are issued at the Queen's pleasure at any given time. The Special Honours refer the award of the Order of the Garter, Order of the Thistle, Order of Merit, Royal Victorian Order and the Order of St John. Life peerages are at times also awarded as special honours.

== Lord Lieutenant ==
- Brigadier Robert Aitken, CBE – to be Lord-Lieutenant of Gwent. – 21 January 2016
- Morfudd Ann Meredith – to be Lord-Lieutenant of South Glamorgan. – 14 June 2016
- His Grace The Duke of Buccleuch and Queensberry, KBE – to be Lord-Lieutenant of Roxburgh, Ettrick and Lauderdale. – 30 November 2016

== Life Peer ==
=== Conservative Party ===
- Mark Ian Price, CVO to be Baron Price, of Sturminster Newton in the County of Dorset – 4 March 2016

== Most Noble Order of the Garter ==
Order of the Garter ribbon

=== Knight Companion of the Order of the Garter (KG) ===
- The Rt Hon. The Lord Shuttleworth, Bt KCVO – 18 May 2016
- Sir David William Brewer, Kt CMG CVO – 18 May 2016

== Knight Bachelor ==
Knight's Bachelor ribbon

- The Hon. Mr Justice Andrew William Baker – 16 December 2016
- The Hon. Mr Justice Peter Nicholas Francis – 16 December 2016
- The Hon. Mr Justice Neil Stephen Garnham – 16 December 2016
- The Hon. Mr Justice Nicholas Lavender – 16 December 2016
- The Hon. Mr Justice Stephen Nathan Morris – 16 December 2016
- The Hon. Mr Justice Michael Alexander Soole – 16 December 2016

== Most Honourable Order of the Bath ==
Ribbon bar of the Order of the Bath

=== Knight Grand Cross of the Order of the Bath (GCB) ===
Honorary

- His Excellency Juan Manuel Santos – President of Colombia – 2016

== Most Distinguished Order of St Michael and St George ==
Order of St Michael and St George ribbon

=== Knight Commander of the Order of St Michael and St George (KCMG) ===
Honorary

- Baron Peter Piot – for services to the global response to AIDS and the Ebola epidemic

== Royal Victorian Order ==
Royal Victorian Order ribbon

Royal Victorian Order (Honorary appointment) ribbon

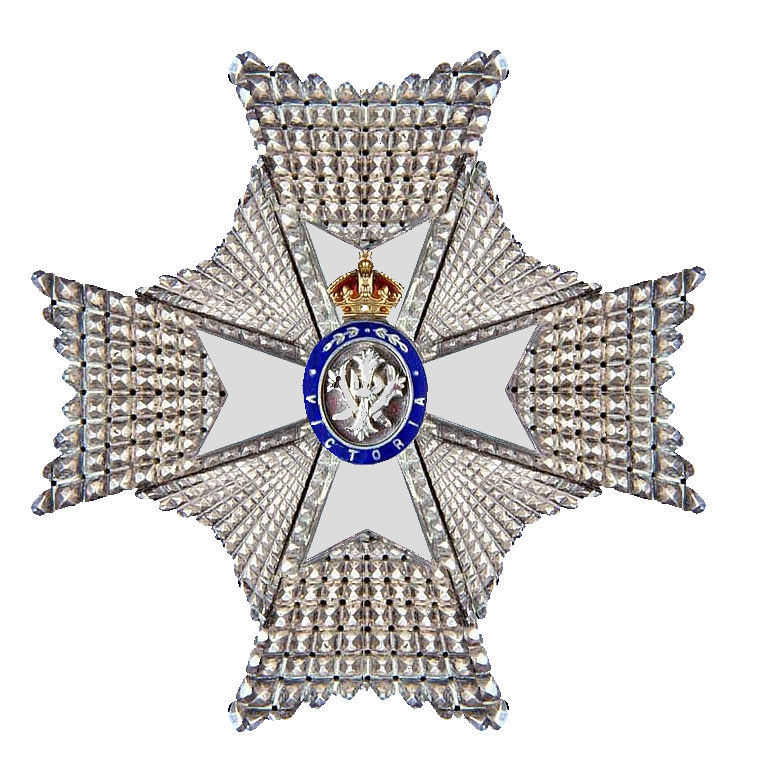
Insignia of a Knight Commander of the Royal Victorian Order

=== Knight Grand Cross of the Royal Victorian Order (GCVO) ===
Honorary

- Kamalesh Sharma – on retirement as Secretary General of the Commonwealth of Nations – 24 March 2016

=== Knight Commander of the Royal Victorian Order (KCVO) ===
- Major General Edward Smyth-Osbourne, CBE – on relinquishment of the appointment of Major-General commanding the Household Division. – 17 June 2016

=== Commander of the Royal Victorian Order (CVO) ===
- Graham Paul Sharpe, LVO – on relinquishment of the appointment of Director of Property Projects, Royal Household. – 19 July 2016
- Lieutenant General Richard Nugee, CBE – on the relinquishment of his appointment as Defence Services Secretary. – 25 October 2016
- Nicholas Altham Kidd, LVO – on retirement as Training Captain/Aircraft Captain, The Queen’s Helicopter Flight. – 11 November 2016

=== Lieutenant of the Royal Victorian Order (LVO) ===
- David George Clark, MVO – on retirement as Locksmith/Fitter, Royal Household. – 4 March 2016
- Chief Inspector Timothy Andrew Marriott Nash, MVO – Metropolitan Police – For services to Royalty Protection. – 19 August 2016
- Peter Charles Taylor, MVO – on the relinquishment of his appointment as Fire Safety Manager, Windsor Castle. – 14 October 2016
- Alan Richard Donnithorne, MVO – on retirement as Head of Paper Conservation, Royal Collection Trust. – 28 October 2016

=== Member of the Royal Victorian Order (MVO) ===
- Terence Joseph Lynch – on retirement as Operations Surveyor, London Palaces, Royal Household – 23 February 2016
- Captain (QGO) Buddhibahadur Bhandari, Queen's Gurkha Engineers – on relinquishment of his appointment as Queen’s Gurkha Orderly Officer – 15 July 2016
- Captain (QGO) Muktiprasad Gurung, Queen's Gurkha Engineers – on relinquishment of his appointment as Queen's Gurkha Orderly Officer – 15 July 2016
- Henry John Goulding – in recognition of his work for the Sandringham Estate and the Duchy of Lancaster. – 19 July 2016.
- Meryl Georgina Walter; formerly Assistant Communications Secretary, Royal Household. – 18 October 2016

== Most Excellent Order of the British Empire ==
Ribbon bar of the Order of the British Empire (Military)

Ribbon bar of the Order of the British Empire (Civil)

=== Knight Commander of the Order of the British Empire (KBE) ===
Honorary

- Prof. Martin Hairer FRS – for services to Mathematical Sciences

Military division
Honorary

- General Martin Dempsey, United States Army – 17 October 2016

=== Dame Commander of the Order of the British Empire (DBE) ===
- The Hon. Mrs Justice Bobbie Cheema-Grubb – 16 December 2016
- The Hon. Mrs Justice Siobhan Keegan – 16 December 2016
- The Hon. Mrs Justice Nerys Angharad Jefford – 16 December 2016
- The Hon. Mrs Justice Juliet Mary May – 16 December 2016
- The Hon. Justice Denise McBride – 16 December 2016
- The Hon. Mrs Justice Finola Mary Lucy O’Farrell – 16 December 2016

=== Commander of the Order of the British Empire (CBE) ===
Military division

- Major General Robert Bernard Bruce, DSO – 18 March 2016
- Brigadier James Richard Hugh Stopford – 18 March 2016

=== Officer of the Order of the British Empire (OBE) ===
Honorary

- Gillian Anderson – for Services to Drama

Military division

- Captain Nicholas Cooke-Priest, Royal Navy – 18 March 2016
- Major Edward Gilbert Robin Cartwright, The Parachute Regiment – 18 March 2016
- Acting Colonel (now Colonel) Edward James Marston Dawes, Royal Regiment of Artillery – 18 March 2016
- Colonel (now Acting Brigadier) Angus George Costeker Fair, DSO – 18 March 2016
- Wing Commander Michael Robert Formby, Royal Air Force – 18 March 2016

=== Member of the Order of the British Empire (MBE) ===
Honorary

- Sophie Katsarava – in recognition of her outstanding contribution to strengthening relations between Georgia and the United Kingdom in the education sector.

Military division

- Lieutenant Commander Andrew Scott Brown, Royal Navy – 18 March 2016
- Major Andrew Richard Nicklin, Royal Corps of Signals – 18 March 2016
- Major Richard Darren Walker, The Royal Dragoon Guards – 18 March 2016
- Flight Lieutenant Rebecca Jane Hutchings, Royal Air Force – 18 March 2016
- Lieutenant Colonel Gary O’Neil, Canadian Army – 23 September 2016

== Distinguished Service Order ==
Ribbon bar of the Distinguished Service Order

=== Companion of the Distinguished Service Order (DSO) ===
- Captain Michael Olaf Chetwynd Dobbin, Grenadier Guards – 18 March 2016

== Distinguished Service Cross (DSC) ==
Ribbon bar of the Distinguished Service Cross

- Sergeant (now Acting Colour Sergeant) Robert Baden John Colley, Royal Marines – 18 March 2016

== Military Cross (MC) ==
Ribbon bar of the Military Cross

- Sergeant Nicholas James Hillyard, Royal Corps of Signals – 18 March 2016
- Colour Sergeant Jordan Edward Mckenzie, The Royal Regiment of Scotland – 18 March 2016

== Royal Victorian Medal (RVM) ==
Royal Victorian Medal ribbon

Silver

- Georgina Mary Jean Tindal – on retirement as Resident Warden, Pensioner Accommodation at Windsor. – 6 December 2016

== Mentioned in Despatches ==
Palm of the Mentioned in Despatches

- Colour Sergeant Stephen James Walker, Royal Marines – 18 March 2016
- Colour Sergeant Andrew Neil Brayshaw, The Parachute Regiment – 18 March 2016
- Colour Sergeant Ian George Gallagher, The Royal Regiment of Scotland – 18 March 2016

== Queen's Commendation for Bravery ==
- Marine (now Acting Lance Corporal) Kieran Robert Scott, Royal Marines – 18 March 2016
- Sergeant James Lyndon, Royal Marines – 18 March 2016
- Staff Sergeant Peter James Ashton, Royal Regiment of Artillery – 18 March 2016
- Staff Sergeant Edward James Clinton, The Royal Logistic Corps – 18 March 2016
- Staff Sergeant Richard Thomas McKinnon, The Royal Logistic Corps – 18 March 2016
- Sergeant Dhaniram Rai, The Royal Gurkha Rifles – 18 March 2016
- Lance Corporal Sean Joseph Wilson, The Mercian Regiment – 18 March 2016
- Senior Aircraftsman Shane Joseph Mitchley, Royal Air Force – 18 March 2016

== Queen's Commendation for Bravery in the Air ==
- Sergeant Michael Edward Beamish, Royal Air Force – 18 March 2016

== Queen's Commendation for Valuable Service ==
Palm of the Queen's Commendation for Valuable Service

- Acting Major (now Major) Henry Dowlen, MBE, Royal Marines Reserve – 18 March 2016
- Petty Officer Engineering Technician (Weapon Engineering) Luke Ebsworth, Royal Navy – 18 March 2016
- Warrant Officer 1 Engineering Technician (Marine Engineering) Alan Evans, Royal Navy – 18 March 2016
- Commander Stuart Andrew Finn, Royal Navy – 18 March 2016
- Corporal Matthew Goldsworthy, Royal Marines – 18 March 2016
- Chief Petty Officer (Underwater Warfare) Julian Lee, Royal Navy – 18 March 2016
- Marine August Emanuel Nils Lersten, Royal Marines – 18 March 2016
- Petty Officer (Diver) Stuart Russell Rice, Royal Navy – 18 March 2016
- Captain David Bissett Smith, Royal Fleet Auxiliary – 18 March 2016
- Sergeant Lewis David Arthey, The Princess of Wales’s Royal Regiment – 18 March 2016
- Lieutenant Colonel (now Colonel) Dominic Stead James Biddick, MBE, MC, The Royal Anglian Regiment – 18 March 2016
- Staff Sergeant Andrew John Coy, Army Air Corps – 18 March 2016
- Sergeant (now Acting Staff Sergeant) Thomas Edward Trevithick Dawson, The Princess of Wales’s Royal Regiment – 18 March 2016
- Sergeant (now Acting Staff Sergeant) Paul Anthony Dilloway, Royal Army Medical Corps – 18 March 2016
- Lieutenant Colonel Mark Clement Gidlow-Jackson, MBE, The Rifles – 18 March 2016
- Staff Sergeant Gregory Mitchell Haskins, Adjutant General’s Corps (Royal Military Police) – 18 March 2016
- Brigadier Andrew Gordon Hughes, MBE – 18 March 2016
- Warrant Officer Class 2 Paul Michael Kearney, The Royal Anglian Regiment – 18 March 2016
- Staff Sergeant Richard Charles Kerry, Adjutant General’s Corps (Royal Military Police) – 18 March 2016
- Lieutenant Colonel (now Acting Colonel) Eldon Nicholas Somerville Millar, MBE, Corps of Royal Engineers – 18 March 2016
- Brigadier Charles Spencer Thomas Page, MBE – 18 March 2016
- Major Samuel James Roberts, Intelligence Corps – 18 March 2016
- Captain Philip Charles Rowland, Royal Corps of Signals – 18 March 2016
- Warrant Officer Class 2 Jamie Rufus, The Rifles – 18 March 2016
- Acting Staff Sergeant Gareth David Taylor, Corps of Royal Electrical and Mechanical Engineers – 18 March 2016
- Captain Timothy James Hamilton Towler, The Royal Regiment of Scotland – 18 March 2016
- Flight Lieutenant Samuel John Baker, Royal Air Force – 18 March 2016
- Wing Commander Matthew Edward Lawrence, Royal Air Force – 18 March 2016

== Order of St John ==
Order of St John ribbon

=== Bailiff Grand Cross of the Order of St John ===
- Lieutenant Colonel Sir Malcolm Ross, GCVO, OBE
- The Right Reverend Tim Stevens, CBE

=== Knight of the Order of St John ===
- John Walker Bain, MNZM, JP
- Geoffrey Thomas Ridley
- Surgeon Rear Admiral Lionel Jarvis, CBE
- Richard Ward Clark
- His Excellency Lieutenant General Edward Grant Martin Davis, CB, CBE
- Lieutenant General Sir James Benjamin Dutton, KCB, CBE, ADC
- Dr Kenneth Forde
- Dennis Clair Hensley
- The Very Reverend Ernest Hunt III
- The Reverend Preston Telford Kelsey II
- The Reverend Dr Joseph Walter Lund
- General Sir John Chalmers McColl, KCB, CBE, DSO
- Mark Charles Pigott
- The Reverend Carl Dietrich Reimers
- John Winthorp
- The Reverend Deacon Robert John Amadeus Zito

=== Dame of the Order of St John ===
- Dame Patsy Reddy, DNZM
- Betty Darlene George Bialek
- Anna Mary Curren
- Vivian Ann Davidson Hewitt
- Karen Miller Lamb
- Aimée Madvay Squires
- Dr Catherine Dyer Stevenson
- Jane Hill Told

=== Commander of the Order of St John ===
- Alan Clifford Cook
- Sir David Gascoigne, KNZM, CBE
- Lieutenant Colonel John Arthur Pinel
- Brigadier Robert Aitken, CBE
- The Most Reverend Paul Kwong
- Captain (Retired) Roderick Peter Abell Sale
- Lee Warwick Short
- Kenneth Ivan Williamson, QSM, JP
- Souella Maria Cumming
- Susan Paiahua Dunn
- Miss Sara Elinor Edwards
- Roslyn Ellen Smith

=== Officer of the Order of St John ===
- Ang Lye Hong,
- Michael Keith Bancroft, JP
- Bryan Leslie Dittmer
- Colonel (Retired) Stephen John Franklin
- Roy Edwin Horwell
- The Reverend Peter Douglas Koon
- Rodney James Love
- Dr Michael Eric Nelson
- Trevor John Pelly
- Julian Mallory Price
- Philip David Rankin
- Manin Singh,
- Annette Elaine Binnie
- Miriama Evans
- Ms Barbara Ann Lock
- Ms Sheryl-Lee Elizabeth Morrby
- Eileen Nancy New
