= Bruce Keogh =

British cardiac surgeon (born 1954)

Sir Bruce Keogh KBE FMedSci

Chair, Birmingham Women’s and Children’s Hospital NHS Foundation Trust
- Incumbent
- Assumed office 29 January 2018

National Medical Director for NHS England
- In office 1 April 2013 – 28 January 2018
- Preceded by: No previous incumbents
- Succeeded by: Stephen Powis

NHS Medical Director
- In office 12 November 2007 – 31 March 2013
- Preceded by: No previous incumbents
- Succeeded by: No successor. Post transferred to NHS England in April 2013.

Personal details
- Born: 24 November 1954 (age 71) Salisbury, Southern Rhodesia (Now Harare, Zimbabwe)
- Education: Charing Cross Hospital Medical School
- Profession: Physician and surgeon

Professor Sir Bruce Edward Keogh, KBE, FMedSci, FRCS, FRCP (/ˈkjoʊ/ KEE-oh; born 24 November 1954) is a Rhodesian-born British surgeon who specialises in cardiac surgery. He was medical director of the National Health Service in England from 2007 and national medical director of the NHS Commissioning Board (NHS England) from 2013 until his retirement early in 2018. He is chair of Birmingham Women's and Children's NHS Foundation Trust and chairman of The Scar Free Foundation.

== Early life ==
Keogh was born on 24 November 1954 in Salisbury, Rhodesia (now Harare, Zimbabwe), the son of Gerald and Marjorie Beatrice Keogh (née Craig). His father held a senior position in the Civil service, having been Chief Inspector of Public Services for the Federation of Rhodesia and Nyasaland while his mother was a Hansard reporter in parliament. He attended the private Catholic boys school St George's College, Harare.

== Clinical medical career (1980–2007) ==
Prior to becoming full-time NHS Medical Director in November 2007, Keogh practised as a cardiac surgeon with a special interest in reconstructive mitral valve surgery.

He earned a Bachelor of Science degree and Bachelor of Medicine and Surgery degree from Charing Cross Hospital Medical School, part of the University of London, in 1977 and 1980, respectively.

He was a demonstrator in anatomy at Charing Cross Hospital Medical School before training in general surgery in London and Sheffield, and becoming a FRCS in 1985. He then opted for a career in cardiac surgery, returning to the Hammersmith Hospital as a registrar. During this time, he spent a year as a laboratory-based British Heart Foundation Junior Research Fellow, which led to the award of an MD degree in 1989 for research into laser coronary angioplasty. He was appointed as senior registrar on the West London training rotation where he spent time at St George's Hospital and the Harefield Hospital training in cardiac, pulmonary and oesophageal surgery. He was subsequently appointed a university senior lecturer in cardiothoracic surgery at the Royal Postgraduate Medical School and honorary consultant surgeon at the Hammersmith Hospital between 1991 and 1995. He then took an NHS consultant position in Birmingham where he became the clinical service lead for cardiothoracic surgery and Associate Medical Director for Clinical Governance at University Hospital Birmingham before being appointed professor of cardiac surgery at University College London and director of surgery at The Heart Hospital in 2004.

In 1994, he established the National Adult Cardiac Surgical Database and, as a consequence, he is perhaps best known for his work promoting the measurement, analysis and public disclosure of clinical outcomes. He has also published numerous peer-reviewed scientific articles on coronary artery vasomotor tone, the effect of cardiopulmonary bypass on gut blood flow and function, myocardial protection during surgery, surgery for patients with poor left ventricular function and the effects of social deprivation on cardiac surgical outcomes. He has co-authored a book Evidence for Cardiothoracic Surgery (2005), and another on Normal Surface Anatomy (1984). While at UCL, he brought the national registries on adult and pediatric cardiac surgery, myocardial infarction, coronary angioplasty and pacemakers into a new National Institute for Cardiovascular Outcomes Research.

His work with Paolo Camici using PET scanning to identify hibernating myocardium in people with heart failure in the mid-1990s helped transform surgery for heart failure worldwide. He performed the first successful transabdominal, off-pump gastroepiploic artery bypass graft to the heart in the UK and was among the first to adopt minimally invasive, direct coronary artery bypass surgery, thoracoscopic mitral valve surgery and warm blood cardioplegia for myocardial protection.

Keogh has been active on many medical and professional committees. He has been secretary and president of the Society for Cardiothoracic Surgery in Great Britain and Ireland, Secretary General of the European Association for Cardio-Thoracic Surgery a director of the Society of Thoracic Surgeons in the US. and president of the Cardiothoracic Section of the Royal Society of Medicine. He is an elected member of the American Association for Thoracic Surgery and a Fellow of the European Society of Cardiology.

He has served on the Council of the Royal College of Surgeons of England, the Joint Committee on Intercollegiate Examinations and the Specialist Advisory Committee on Higher Surgical Training for cardiothoracic surgery. In addition, he has served as a member of the Civil Aviation Authority Medical Advisory Panel, and on the trustee board for the National Confidential Enquiry into Patient Outcome and Death and the Board of the Picker Institute. He has sat on the editorial boards of Heart and the Journal of the Royal Society of Medicine. Throughout his clinical career, he had a strong relationship with the British Heart Foundation, having been a BHF junior research fellow, senior lecturer, member of the Research Grants Committee and Council member.

Prior to becoming medical director of the National Health Service, he served on the National Coronary Heart Disease Taskforce and the NHS Standing Medical Advisory Committee, and was chairman of the NHS Information Taskforce on Clinical Outcomes for the Department of Health. He has also served as Commissioner on the Commission for Health Improvement and the Healthcare Commission, where he chaired the Clinical Strategy Group.

Given his long-standing interest in measuring and publishing clinical outcomes as a driver for improving quality, in 2007 he was asked by Patricia Hewitt, then Secretary of State for Health, to assist Tim Kelsey in establishing a new health website for the NHS called "NHS Choices". Keogh's role was to ensure credible clinical content. He chaired the clinical advisory group and subsequently went on to chair the NHS Choices Board. NHS Choices has rebranded as nhs.uk .

== NHS Medical Director, Department of Health (2007–2013) ==
As medical director of the NHS (2007–2013), he was a director general in the Department of Health where he led the Medical Directorate, which had oversight for clinical policy and strategy in the NHS. This included the work of the National Clinical Directors and their associated strategies such as those for coronary heart disease, stroke, cancer, respiratory disease, renal disease, liver disease, trauma, and transplantation. He established the Healthcare Quality Improvement Partnership (HQIP), a joint venture between the Academy of Medical Royal Colleges and the Royal College of Nursing to develop and run the national clinical audits.

Keogh's role also included oversight of the medicines supply chain into the UK, policy relating to the pharmaceutical industry, drug pricing, prescriptions and the role of pharmacy in England and sponsorship of the work programmes of the National Institute for Health and Care Excellence (NICE), the NHS regulator the Healthcare Commission and the National Patient Safety Agency (NPSA), including the National Confidential Enquiries and the National Research Ethics Service. Through sponsorship of Medical Education England (MEE), a product of the 2008 Darzi review of the NHS, he had oversight of postgraduate education of doctors, dentists, pharmacists and clinical scientists, but this was superseded by Health Education England (HEE) in 2012 to ensure a balanced and integrated approach to all healthcare professionals.

In 2008, Keogh succeeded Matthew Swindells as Interim Director General for Informatics in the Department of Health. During this time, he set out a vision for NHS IT and Informatics that would learn from successful GP systems and inform future direction for the National Programme for IT. This review recommended the development of essential functionality that would create a pull effect from clinicians by ensuring NHS IT was useful in conducting day-to-day business. The idea was to create a create a "tipping point" in the acceptability and demand for strategic IT systems. The five key elements (the "Clinical 5") for secondary care were: a Patient Administration System (PAS) with integration with other systems and sophisticated reporting; Order Communications and Diagnostics Reporting (including all pathology and radiology tests and tests ordered in primary care); letters with coding (discharge summaries, clinic and Accident and Emergency letters); scheduling (for beds, tests, theatres etc.); and e-Prescribing. This set the NHS on a path to electronic health records.

Within the report, he also recommended a National Quality Framework based on clinical metrics. The lack of a national set of clinical outcome and quality measures had impeded progress towards a culture of continuous quality improvement.

On handing over to his successor, Christine Connelly, Keogh emphasised three priorities for NHS IT. The first was the need to focus on the £12.4 billion worth of contracts within the National Programme for IT in the NHS. The second was the need to get the technology right for clinicians who use it. The third was the need to focus on the patient, saying: "Most importantly, we must not lose sight that the technology is about underpinning the interaction between citizens of this country and health and social care services."

Keogh believes the NHS should be evidence-based, patient-focussed and outcomes-driven. Therefore, as Medical Director, he opposed the establishment of the Cancer Drugs Fund, which he believed would undermine NICE and the quest for an evidence-based NHS. He was subsequently responsible for drawing together NICE, cancer charities and the pharmaceutical industry to lay the groundwork for a revised evidence driven CDF, which went live under NICE in 2017.

Keogh's team was responsible for implementing the majority of the recommendations from Lord Darzi's review of the NHS "High Quality Care for All", published in 2008. This review has been credited with refocusing the NHS on quality of care. Keogh's team also developed the Quality Framework for the NHS (based on the work of Sheila Leatherman) and included in Darzi's review. The principles were simple: define what is meant by "quality", measure it, publish it for everyone to see, reward those who do well, regulate for minimum standards, promote and develop leadership for quality within the NHS, and promote research and innovation within the NHS, by drawing on and linking with the best British universities and biotechnology companies in to form academic science networks. The resultant definition of healthcare quality, based on the provision of effective care, safe care and a positive experience, became widely accepted and was subsequently inserted into the Health Service Act (2006) (Part1, Para 1A, sections a-c) via the Health and Social Care Act (2012).

In 2011, after the collapse of the British Association of Medical Managers, he established the Faculty of Medical Leadership and Management under the jurisdiction of the Medical Royal Colleges in order to ensure access to all doctors, not just those in leadership or management positions. He subsequently asked the Faculty to administer the National Medical Director's Clinical Fellows Scheme, which had grown out of the Clinical Advisor Scheme in the Department of Health, thereby ensuring a long-term home for the programme. The following year, he helped to establish a shadowing period for new Foundation Trainees.

== NHS National Medical Director, NHS England (2013–2018) ==
Following the election of a coalition government in 2010, he was tasked with making clinical outcomes the currency of NHS business. In response, his team developed the NHS Outcomes Framework, which was based on the observation that all healthcare systems should do five things well: first, the NHS should stop you dying prematurely from things they could influence through treatment or prevention through immunisations e.g. stroke, heart attacks, measles. Second, the NHS should look after you well if you have a long-term medical condition such as diabetes, asthma, arthritis. Third, the NHS should treat you effectively if you need a short episode of care e.g. broken leg, an operation or infection. Fourth, the NHS should treat you well. The experience should be as positive as possible, ranging from participation in decisions about your treatment to decent customer service. Finally, the NHS should treat you safely. All of these are measurable at different levels. They also dovetail with the definition of quality in the three domains of effectiveness, safety, and experience.

The five domains of the NHS Outcomes Framework have formed the basis of the Government's Mandate to NHS England and NHS England's planning guidance for the NHS where they give clarity of purpose and direction to the NHS in a way that was previously undefined. He has argued that the role of NHS England is to "turn taxpayers' money into good clinical outcomes".

Following the Lansley reforms of the NHS, he was appointed National Medical Director in NHS England from 2013, where he was responsible for promoting a focus on quality, clinical leadership and innovation. To facilitate these aims, he was responsible for overseeing the establishment of Academic Health Science Networks, Strategic Clinical Networks and Clinical Senates. He put clinicians at the heart of NHS England through the Chief Pharmaceutical, Dental, Scientific and Allied Health Professions officers, a primary care deputy, a medical director for specialised commissioning, regional medical directors and pharmacists, area medical directors, more than twenty expert national clinical directors and junior doctors, pharmacists and dentists through the National Medical Director's Clinical Fellowship Scheme. In 2015, he established and chaired the NHS National Innovation Accelerator to help innovators and promote innovation in the NHS.

With the advent of medical revalidation, he became the senior responsible officer for doctors in England.

In November 2014, Keogh oversaw the publication of around 5,000 consultant surgeons' mortality and procedure related-complication rates. He warned that a further 2,500 who did not share this information would face penalties.

In April 2017, Keogh announced that he would be stepping down at the end of the year, and, in January 2018, left NHS England to become chair of Birmingham Women's and Children's NHS Foundation Trust.

== National reviews ==
In 2008, while interim Director General for Informatics in the Department of Health, Keogh undertook a National Health Informatics review. He argued for a Chief Information Officer for Health and the development of associated career structures in the NHS. He also highlighted the need to "focus on clinical metrics that improve quality, in the context of patient safety, patient experience and patient outcomes. The lack of a national set of clinical outcome and quality measures has slowed progress towards a culture of continuous quality improvement. It has prevented meaningful institutional comparisons and deprived the public of essential information...".

In 2009, Keogh led a national taskforce to improve neonatal services.

In 2012, he co-chaired a review of medical and dental school intakes, with Sir Graeme Catto, on behalf of the Higher Education Funding Council and the Department of Health.

Also in 2012, he was asked by the Secretary of State for Health to investigate the safety of PIP breast implants, a product of fraudulent quality, but concluded that, although they were more likely to rupture than other implants, they did not pose significant health risk to women a finding endorsed by a subsequent European report in 2013.

Further In 2012, Keogh ordered a review of the national quality assurance frameworks and governance for pathology services with the aim of making the process more robust and transparent. This was prompted by a series of misdiagnoses at Kingsmill Hospital, which had negatively affected the care of a number of women with breast cancer. The review reported in 2014.

In 2013, he published four significant reports:

- One on how to improve safety in the cosmetic intervention industry through a review of regulation with hard hitting recommendations. An independent review of the related ethical issues by The Nuffield Council on Bioethics concluded: "all recommendations in the 2013 Keogh review of the regulation of cosmetic interventions should be implemented in full".
- A second, widely known as the Keogh Review, on the 14 trusts with the highest mortality rates in England. The way these were conducted formed the basis for the subsequent Care Quality Commission hospital inspections. This review was commended for its transparency and public disclosure of all data, analysis and assessments.
- A third, presenting a vision for the future of urgent and emergency care services in England.
- A fourth proposing the provision of better NHS weekend services, which was approved by the NHS England Board in December 2013.

In 2017, he wrote to Jeremy Hunt, the Secretary of State for Health, recommending changes to the way ambulance response times were monitored in order to ensure the sickest patients received the quickest response. The recommendations based on a rigorous review of 14 million 999 calls were accepted and implemented.

In 2019, he led a review for the Independent Healthcare Providers Network aimed at improving clinical governance in independent healthcare providers in the UK.

== Controversies ==
In 2012, Keogh was asked by Jeremy Hunt, Secretary of State for Health, to reassure him that there had been adequate clinical consultation on proposals to reconfigure services in south London. In a letter to Hunt, Keogh concluded that there had been adequate clinical consultation, but he also included a warning about closing Lewisham A&E. His advice was seen by some as an intervention to protect and prevent the closure of Lewisham A&E and by others as the opposite. Much debate centred on a projection regarding the number of lives that might be saved, a calculation of unknown origin – attributed by some to Keogh and by others to work conducted by the London Clinical Senate.

In 2013, Keogh provoked the suspension of children's heart surgery in Leeds just before the Easter weekend, based on evidence from Professor Roger Boyle, the former national heart czar and director of the National Institute for Cardiovascular Outcomes Research, that the mortality rate was 2.75 times higher than might be expected for their practice. Keogh was also concerned that one consultant surgeon was suspended from operating, that the senior consultant was on holiday and that the remaining surgeons were locums. The hospital could not contradict the mortality figures, so he suggested suspending surgery till the full facts could be verified. It subsequently turned out that Leeds had submitted poor data, twenty times more missing data than any other unit in the country, despite the fact that one of the cardiologists ran the national registry. After Leeds had submitted accurate and complete data, analysis showed that, although they still had the highest mortality in the country, they were within normal statistical boundaries. His intervention was widely regarded as sensible and preemptory given the evidence, but some thought it precipitous. Keogh remained unrepentant, arguing he would rather be remembered for preventing an avoidable disaster and embedding the "precautionary principle" in NHS safety culture, than responsible for not acting on reasonable doubt. He cited examples of "prevarication" at Bristol in the 1990s and Mid Staffordshire in the 2000s when some people argued over data while other people were harmed.

In 2014, he told the Parliamentary Health Select Committee that there was "extreme scepticism" in the NHS that the £1.6 billion of NHS money being transferred to local government as the Better Care Fund would be used for the benefit of NHS patients. He expressed concern that it would "be used for filling in potholes" as local councils grappled with their priorities and funding cuts. The remark attracted opprobrium from local government and support in equal measure from NHS commentators.

Ahead of proposed industrial action in England by junior doctors, and shortly after the November 2015 Paris attacks, Keogh sought reassurance that the BMA would call off their proposed strike in the event of a similar event in England. This was not well received by the BMA. Subsequently, when the BMA was proposing withdrawing all emergency cover, he received further criticism for arguing in a Sunday newspaper that specifically withdrawing emergency cover ran against the ethos of being a doctor, was unfair to patients and would destroy trust in the medical profession .

== Non-NHS ==
Keogh has served as a non-executive director of the National Institute for Health and Care Excellence, and is a non-executive director of the UK Government-sponsored Cell and Gene Therapy Catapult, promoting advanced medicinal therapy development in the UK and chairs Arcturis Data.

He also chairs a medical research charity The Scar Free Foundation, and the Ex Fide Fiducia Trust supporting his old school in Zimbabwe.

== Honours ==
Keogh was appointed as an honorary Knight Commander of the Order of the British Empire (KBE) in 2003. He subsequently became a British citizen, and as part of the Queen's Birthday Honours on 11 June 2005, his knighthood became substantive (back dated to 5 February 2004).

Keogh is an honorary Fellow of the Royal College of Physicians of London, the Royal College of General Practitioners, the Royal College of Anaesthetists, the Royal College of Paediatrics and Child Health, the Royal College of Surgeons in Ireland, the American College of Surgeons, the American Surgical Association, the British Society of Interventional Radiology, and the British Association of Aesthetic and Plastic Surgeons. He has been a visiting professor at universities in Japan, China and North America. Closer to home, he has been King James IV Professor of the Royal College of Surgeons of Edinburgh (2005) and Tudor Edwards lecturer (2007), and Hunterian Orator (2013) for the Royal College of Surgeons of England and Kinmonth Lecturer (2013) jointly for the Royal College of Surgeons of England and the Vascular Society of Great Britain and Ireland. In 2009, he delivered the Hunterian Society Oration. In 2014, he delivered the inaugural John Snow Oration for the Royal College of Anaesthetists.

He holds honorary medical doctorates from the universities of Birmingham and Sheffield, and doctorates of science from the University of Toledo, Coventry University and Aston University.

On World Thrombosis Day in 2016, he received an Outstanding Achievement Award in Parliament from Thrombosis UK for establishing and overseeing a national strategy for reducing venous thromboembolism in hospitals in England

He holds a Lifetime Achievement Award from Heart Research UK and the Society for Cardiothoracic Surgery in Great Britain & Ireland (2026).

In 2013, 2014 and 2015, he was ranked by the Health Service Journal as the most influential clinician, in the English NHS. He is consistently ranked as one of the most powerful people in the NHS and in 2014 he was included in the Sunday Times and Debretts list of Britain's 500 most influential people. As of 2015, Keogh was paid a salary of between £190,000 and £194,999 by NHS England, making him one of the 328 most highly paid people in the British public sector at that time.
