= Chief of Personnel =

Chief of Personnel may refer to:

- Chief of Personnel (Australia), of the Australian Defence Force
- Chief of Personnel (Indian Navy)
- Chief of Defence People, earlier called Chief of Defence Personnel, of the British Armed Forces
- Chief of Military Personnel, of the Canadian Armed Forces
- Chief of Naval Personnel, of the United States Navy
- Chief of Staff Personnel, South Africa
- Second Sea Lord and Deputy Chief of Naval Staff, earlier called Second Sea Lord and Chief of Naval Personnel, of the Royal Navy
