= Mike Elviss =

British Army general (born 1972)

Lieutenant General Mike Elviss CB MBE
- Elviss in 2026
- Born: 18 July 1972 (age 54); Harrogate, England
- Education: University of Reading; Cranfield University; King's College London
- Military career
- Allegiance: United Kingdom
- Branch: British Army
- Service years: 1992–present
- Rank: Lieutenant General
- Service number: 540884
- Unit: Royal Artillery
- Commands: 1st Regiment Royal Horse Artillery; 20th Armoured Brigade; 3rd (United Kingdom) Division; Field Army
- Conflicts: War in Afghanistan
- Awards: Companion of the Order of the Bath; Member of the Order of the British Empire; Queen's Commendation for Valuable Service (2)

Lieutenant General Michael Richard Elviss, CB, MBE (born 18 July 1972) is a senior British Army officer. He served as Commander Field Army from March 2024 til March 2026, and is currently Commander, Allied Rapid Reaction Corps.

== Early life and education ==
Elviss was born in Harrogate, Yorkshire, England, on 18 July 1972 to Richard and Gillian Elviss. He was educated at Helsby High School in Helsby, Cheshire, and then at Sir John Deane's College, a sixth form college in Northwich, Cheshire. He studied at the University of Reading (BSc), Cranfield University (PGDip) and King's College London (MA).

== Military career ==
Elviss was commissioned as a second lieutenant (on probation) in the Territorial Army on 29 November 1992. He resigned this commission on 3 September 1994. He then attended the Royal Military Academy Sandhurst, and was commissioned in the Royal Regiment of Artillery, British Army, as a second lieutenant on 12 August 1995 with seniority in that rank from 7 August 1992. The same day, he was promoted to lieutenant with seniority from 7 August 1994. He served with 29th Commando Regiment Royal Artillery from 1995.

He served as commanding officer of the 1st Regiment Royal Horse Artillery from 2011 to 2014. He became the commander of the 20th Armoured Infantry Brigade in 2016; Assistant Chief of Staff, Operations, Field Army in 2018; and was General Officer Commanding 3rd (United Kingdom) Division from February 2020 to October 2021. Elviss was promoted to the substantive rank of major general on 10 February 2020.

After serving as Chief of Staff (Operations) at Permanent Joint Headquarters from October 2021, Elviss was promoted to lieutenant general and became Commander Field Army in March 2024. He took up the NATO post of Commander, Allied Rapid Reaction Corps in March 2026.

He was appointed Master Gunner, St James's Park on 1 November 2025.

Elviss was appointed a Member of the Order of the British Empire in the 2010 New Year Honours, and awarded the Queen's Commendation for Valuable Service in recognition of his services in Afghanistan in September 2011 and again in March 2014. In September 2023, he was appointed a Companion of the Order of the Bath, backdated to 14 April 2023.

Military offices
Preceded by James Swift	General Officer Commanding the 3rd (United Kingdom) Division; 2020–2021	Succeeded by James Martin
Preceded by Ralph Wooddisse	Commander Field Army; 2024–2026	Succeeded by Zac Stenning
Preceded by Nick Borton	Commander Allied Rapid Reaction Corps; 2026–Present	Incumbent
Honorary titles
Preceded by Sir Andrew Gregory	Master Gunner, St. James's Park; 2025–	Incumbent
