= Christopher Nugee =

British lawyer (born 1959)

The Right Honourable Lord Justice Nugee
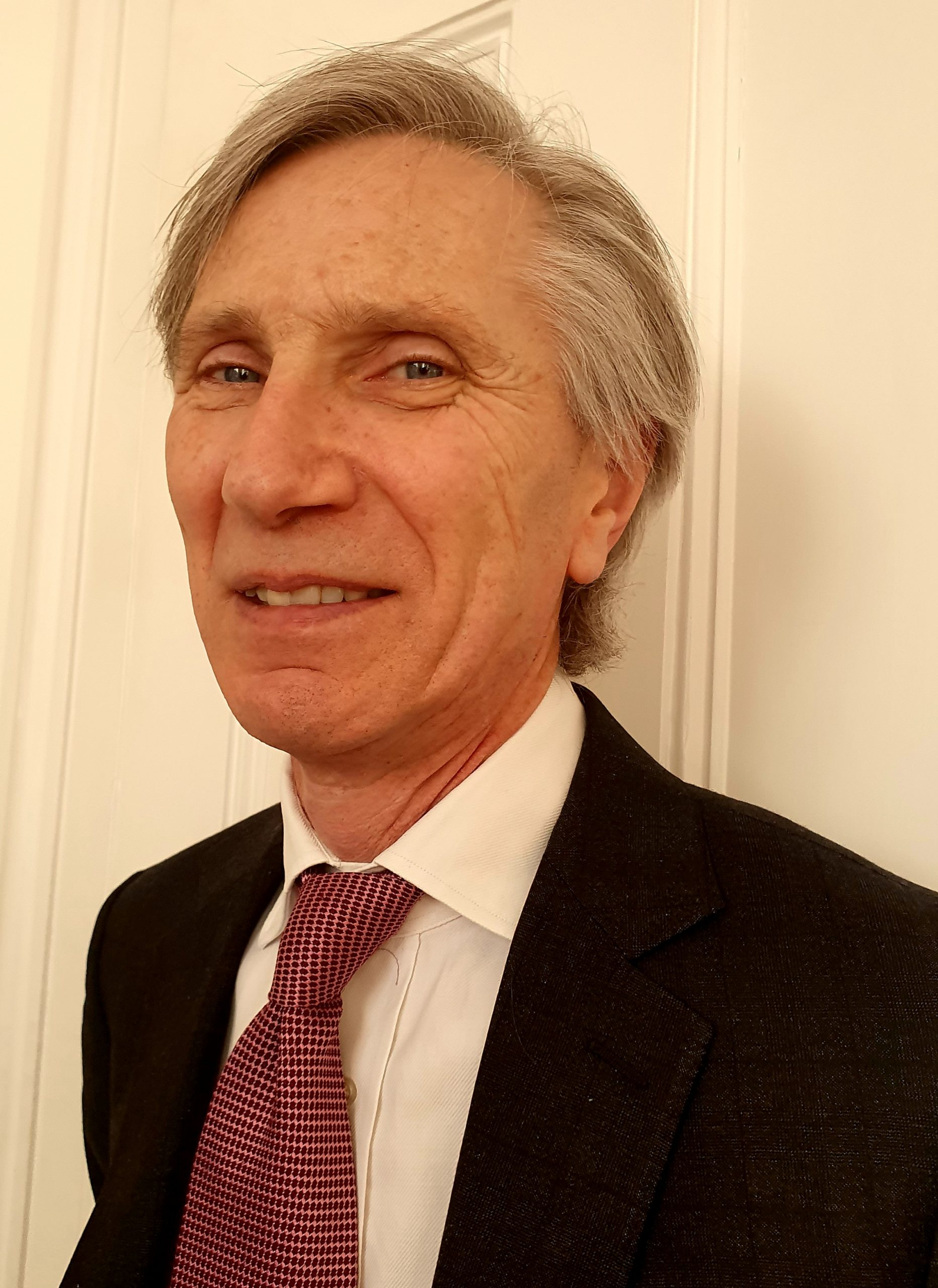

Lord Justice of Appeal
- Incumbent
- Assumed office 2020
- Monarchs: Elizabeth II; Charles III

High Court Judge Chancery Division
- In office 2013–2020

Personal details
- Born: Christopher George Nugee; 23 January 1959 (age 67) London, England
- Spouse: Emily Thornberry (m. 1991)
- Children: 3
- Parent(s): Edward Nugee; Rachel née Makower
- Relatives: Richard Nugee (brother)
- Education: Radley College
- Alma mater: Corpus Christi College, Oxford
- Occupation: Judge
- Profession: Lawyer
- Awards: Knight Bachelor

Sir Christopher George Nugee KC (born 23 January 1959 in London), officially styled Lord Justice Nugee, is a British lawyer who has served as a Lord Justice of Appeal of England and Wales since 2020.

== Early life and education ==
Of Huguenot descent and the second son of Edward Nugee QC TD, he was educated at Radley College before going to Corpus Christi College, Oxford, graduating as BA (proceeding MA) and winning the Eldon Scholarship. He later pursued legal studies at City University (Dip Law).

He is the brother of John, Andrew, and Lt Gen Richard Nugee.

== Legal career ==
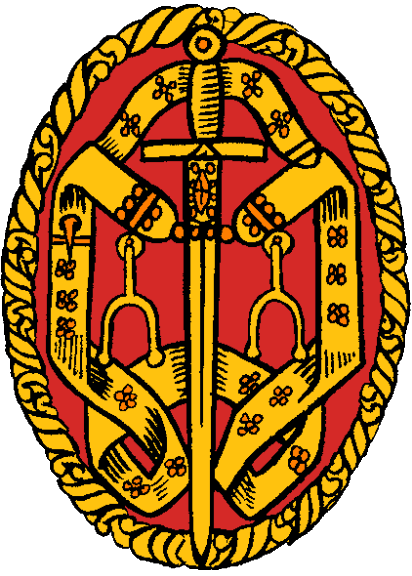
Insignia of a Knight Bachelor

Nugee was called to the Bar at Inner Temple in 1983, taking silk in 1998, then elected a Bencher of the Inn in 2003. He then served as a High Court Judge from 2013 until 2020, assigned to the Chancery Division. Appointed a Knight Bachelor in 2014, he was promoted Lord Justice of Appeal in October 2020 being sworn of the Privy Council.

== Personal life ==
In 1991, Nugee married Emily Thornberry, a senior Labour party politician who formerly served as Shadow Attorney-General. They have three children, and live in Islington, the north London constituency which his wife represents as its Member of Parliament.

== See also ==
- List of Huguenots
