= Patrick Sanders, Baron Sanders of Hallingdal =

British Army officer and Chief of the General Staff since 2022

General The Right Honourable The Lord Sanders of Hallingdal KCB CBE DSO
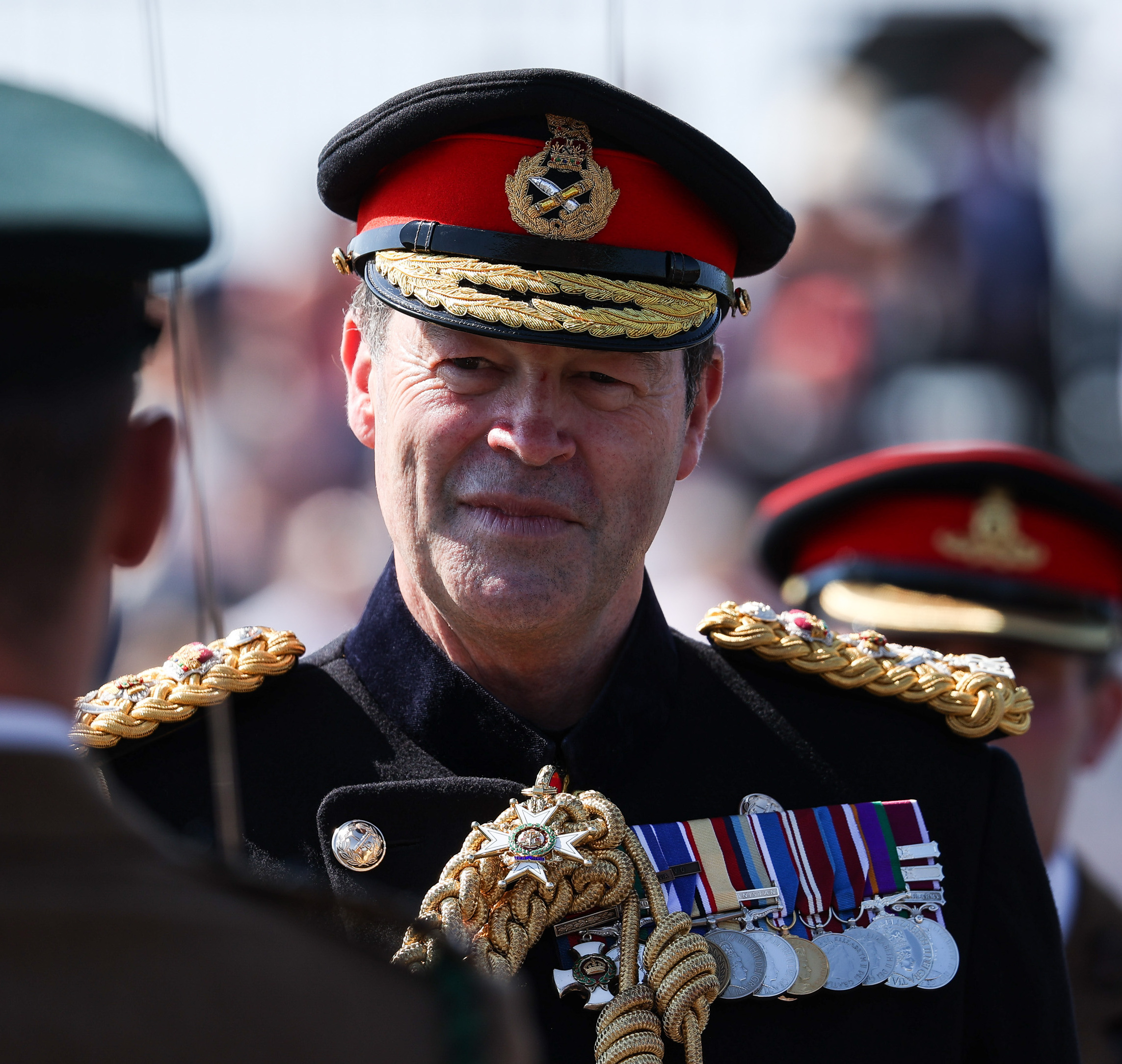
- General Sanders in 2022
- Born: 6 April 1966 (age 60); Tidworth, Wiltshire, England
- Education: Royal Military Academy Sandhurst
- Military career
- Allegiance: United Kingdom
- Branch: British Army
- Service years: 1984–2024
- Rank: General
- Service number: 520489
- Unit: The Rifles
- Commands: Chief of the General Staff; Strategic Command; Field Army; 3rd (United Kingdom) Division; Task Force Helmand; 20th Armoured Brigade; 4th Battalion, The Rifles; 2nd Battalion, The Royal Green Jackets
- Conflicts: The Troubles; Kosovo War; Iraq War; War in Afghanistan
- Awards: Knight Commander of the Order of the Bath; Commander of the Order of the British Empire; Companion of the Distinguished Service Order; Commander of the Legion of Merit (United States)

Member of the House of Lords
- Lord Temporal
- Life peerage 4 September 2026

Personal details
- Party: Conservative

General Patrick Nicholas Yardley Monrad Sanders, Baron Sanders of Hallingdal, KCB, CBE, DSO (born 6 April 1966) is a retired senior British Army officer who served as Chief of the General Staff from 13 June 2022 until 15 June 2024.

== Early life and education ==
Born on 6 April 1966 at Tidworth, Wiltshire, he is the son of Lieutenant Colonel John Sanders and Marianne Monrad. He was educated at Worth School, then an all-boys private boarding school attached to the eponymous Benedictine Abbey. After leaving school, he studied at the University of Exeter, having been awarded a British Army undergraduate cadetship. He left before taking his degree. He later pursued further studies at Cranfield University, graduating with a Master of Arts (MA) degree in defence technology.

== Military career ==
=== Early military career ===
Sanders was commissioned into the Royal Green Jackets, British Army, on 23 September 1984, as a second lieutenant (on probation) as part of his undergraduate cadetship. He left university without completing his degree, and his commission was terminated on 27 July 1985. He then attended the Royal Military Academy, Sandhurst. He was once more commissioned as a second lieutenant in the Royal Green Jackets on 12 April 1986.

He served as a subaltern in Northern Ireland during the Troubles and then undertook tours in Kosovo in 1999 and Bosnia and Herzegovina in 2001. He became Chief of Staff of 1st Mechanised Brigade in 2002 and then Commanding Officer of 2nd Battalion the Royal Green Jackets in 2005. In the latter role he managed the transition of his battalion to become 4th Battalion The Rifles, then seeing action at the siege of UK bases in Basra in 2007 during the Iraq War. On 25 July 2008, he was appointed a Companion of the Distinguished Service Order (DSO) "in recognition of gallant and distinguished services in Iraq during the period 1st October 2007 to 31st March 2008".

Sanders became Commander of 20th Armoured Brigade in August 2009, deployed under Task Force Helmand to Afghanistan in October 2011. On 28 September 2012, he was appointed a Commander of the Order of the British Empire (CBE) "in recognition of gallant and distinguished services in Afghanistan during the period 1 October 2011 to 31 March 2012". He served as Chief of the Defence Staff's Liaison Officer to the United States Joint Chiefs of Staff in 2012 and Assistant Chief of the Defence Staff (Operations) in March 2013. In 2014, he attended the Prime Minister's COBRA meetings on the floods crisis.

=== General officer ===
Sanders took command of the 3rd (United Kingdom) Division in April 2015. Then in December 2016, he was appointed Commander Field Army and promoted lieutenant general. Sanders was promoted general on 6 May 2019 and appointed as Commander Joint Forces Command; Joint Forces Command was renamed as Strategic Command on 9 December 2019.

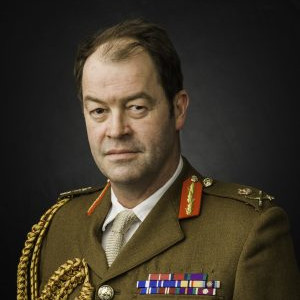
Sanders in 2022

Sanders was appointed a Knight Commander of the Order of the Bath (KCB) in the 2020 New Year Honours. He was the preferred candidate of the Ministry of Defence to succeed General Sir Nick Carter as Chief of the Defence Staff in 2021, due to his expertise in cyber capability, but Prime Minister Boris Johnson picked Admiral Sir Tony Radakin instead. Announced in February 2022, Sanders became Chief of the General Staff in June 2022.

=== Chief of the General Staff ===
On 7 June 2022, Sanders took the decision to cancel an overseas deployment by the 3rd Battalion, Parachute Regiment after a number of incidents which demonstrated a poor standard of discipline in the unit. Armed Forces Minister James Heappey was said to be "sorry and embarrassed" by the "disgraceful" behaviour.

On 16 June 2022, Sanders told British soldiers they are the generation that must prepare "to fight in Europe once again" as Russia was invading Ukraine, stating "There is now a burning imperative to forge an Army capable of fighting alongside our allies and defeating Russia in battle."

The Guardian reported in June 2023 that following concerns in the Ministry of Defence that Sanders might resign over spending cuts in the Army, interviews had already taken place to find Sanders' successor.

Speaking at the Defence iQ International Armoured Vehicles conference in January 2024, Sanders described the British people as part of a "prewar generation" who may have to prepare themselves to fight in a war against Russia. Sanders said the UK needed to take "preparatory steps to enable placing our societies on a war footing", such as a form of national service. Such action was "not merely desirable, but essential", he added. The Guardian later reported that Sanders received a dressing down after this speech, which was not agreed by either 10 Downing Street or the Ministry of Defence. He was succeeded as Chief of the General Staff by General Sir Roland Walker on 15 June 2024. Sanders formally retired from the British Army on 31 December 2024.

On 11 March 2024, he was made a Commander of the Legion of Merit by General Randy George for "excellence in military service".

== Honorary appointments ==
Sanders was Colonel Commandant of The Rifles (2019–2023), and Colonel Commandant of the Honourable Artillery Company from 31 January 2019 to 30 May 2024.

A Freeman of the City of London, he is also a Liveryman of the Blacksmiths' Company.

In March 2023, Sanders was made Honorary Colonel of the Turks and Caicos Islands Regiment, and in 2025 the Honorary Colonel of the Royal Gibraltar Regiment.

In May 2023, Sanders carried the Queen's Sceptre in the Royal Procession at the Coronation of Charles III and Camilla.

He was given a life peerage to sit in the House of Lords as a Conservative peer as part of the July 2026 political peerages; he was created as Baron Sanders of Hallingdal, of Hallingdal in the Kingdom of Norway and East Knoyle in the County of Wiltshire on 4 September 2026.

== Honours and awards ==

Ribbon	Description	Notes
	Knight Commander of the Order of the Bath	Appointed into the Order in 2020
	Commander of the Order of the British Empire	Appointed into the Order in 2012
	Companion of the Distinguished Service Order	Appointed in 2008
	General Service Medal (1962)	
	NATO Kosovo Medal	
	NATO Former Republic of Yugoslavia Medal	
	Iraq Medal	
	Operational Service Medal for Afghanistan	
	Queen Elizabeth II Golden Jubilee Medal	
	Queen Elizabeth II Diamond Jubilee Medal	
	Queen Elizabeth II Platinum Jubilee Medal	
	King Charles III Coronation Medal	
	Accumulated Campaign Service Medal	
	Medal for Long Service and Good Conduct (Military)	With 2 Bars
	Commander of the Legion of Merit	Awarded in 2024
	Life Peerage	Awarded in 2026, part of July 2026 political peerages

Military offices
Preceded by James Cowan	General Officer Commanding 3rd (United Kingdom) Division; 2015–2016	Succeeded by Sir Nick Borton
Preceded by Sir James Everard	Commander Field Army; 2016–2019	Succeeded by Ivan Jones
Preceded by Sir Christopher Deverell	Commander Joint Forces Command (Commander Strategic Command from December 2019); 2019–2022	Succeeded by Sir James Hockenhull
Preceded by Sir Richard Barrons	Colonel Commandant and President, Honourable Artillery Company; 2019–2024	Succeeded by Sir Roland Walker
Preceded by Sir Mark Carleton-Smith	Chief of the General Staff; 2022–2024	Succeeded by Sir Roland Walker
