= Peter Weissberg =

British physician

Peter Leslie Weissberg CBE FRCP FMedSci is a British physician.

Weissberg graduated from Birmingham University with an MBChB degree in Medicine 1976 and an MD degree Medicine in 1985.

Weissberg was appointed as the first British Heart Foundation Professor of Cardiovascular Medicine in the University of Cambridge in 1994. Weissberg became medical director of the British Heart Foundation in 2004. He has been an Honorary Consultant Cardiologist at Addenbrooke's Hospital in Cambridge since 1988.

Weissberg was awarded the honorary degree of Doctor of Science (DSc) by Birmingham University in 2013. He is a Fellow of the Royal College of Physicians and a Fellow of the Academy of Medical Sciences. He was appointed Commander of the Order of the British Empire (CBE) in the 2017 New Year Honours for services to medical research and cardiovascular health.

He is the current Research Council Chairman of The Scar Free Foundation, a medical research charity.
