= The Scar Free Foundation =

Medical research charity focused on scar free healing

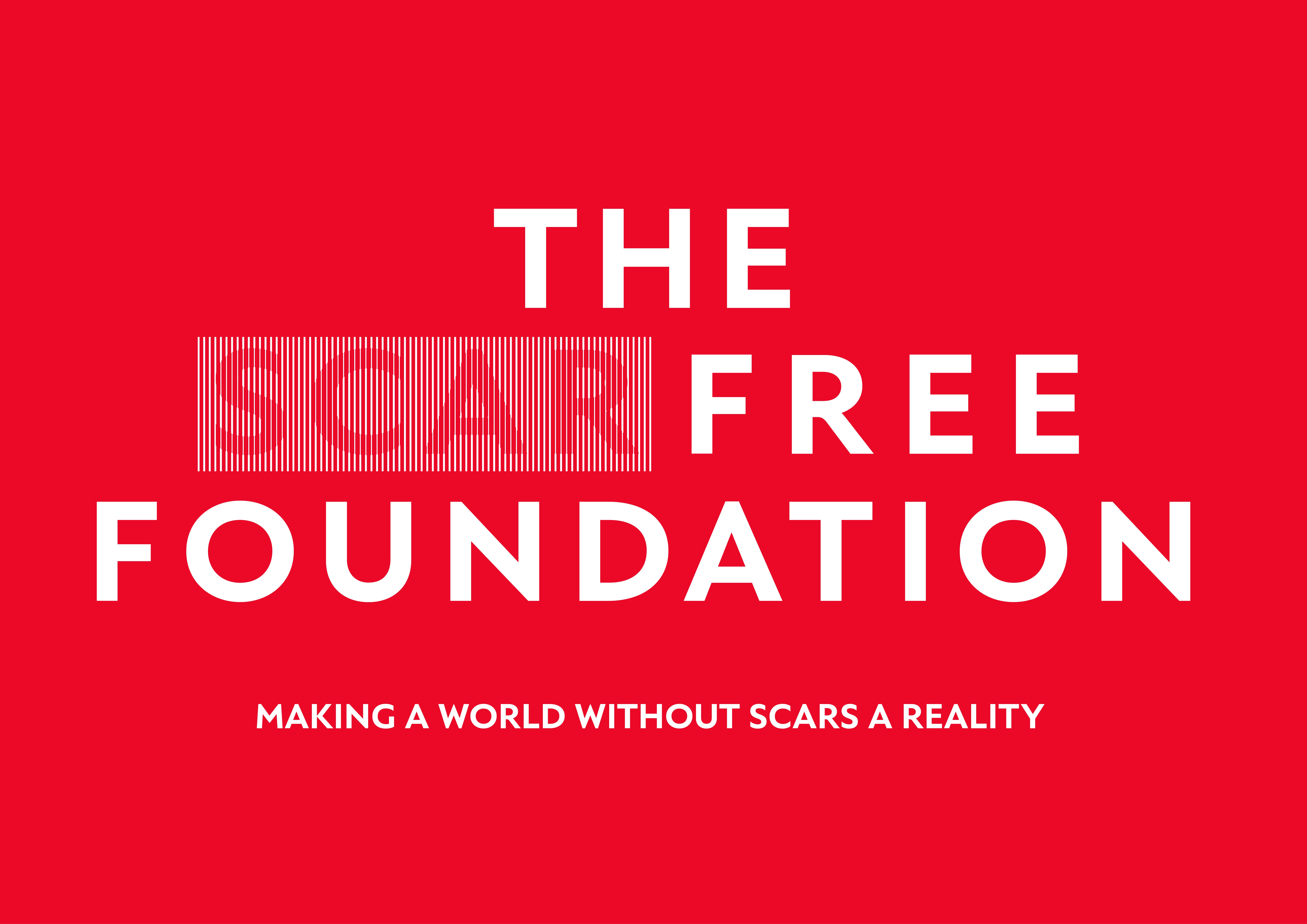
- Established: 1998
- Founder: Michael Brough
- Type: Medical research charity
- Purpose: Wound healing and scarring conditions
- Headquarters: The Royal College of Surgeons of England
- Chairman: Professor Sir Bruce Keogh
- Chief Executive: Lieutenant General Richard Nugee CBE
- Royal Patron: Sophie, Duchess of Edinburgh
- Website: Official website
- Formerly called: The Healing Foundation

The Scar Free Foundation is a medical research charity focused on scar free healing. It was founded in 1998 by plastic surgeon Michael Brough, following his work with survivors of the King's Cross Fire in London. Initially known as The Healing Foundation, it was relaunched as The Scar Free Foundation in 2016.

The charity funds medical research into wound healing and scarring conditions. Current research is focused on identifying the pathways that lead to scarring, developing new treatment options, and improving the psychological outcomes and quality of life of patients currently living with scars.

The current Chairman is former Medical Director of the NHS, Sir Bruce Keogh, and the Chief Executive is Richard Nugee CB CVO CBE. Peter Weissberg CBE is the Research Council Chairman. Sophie, Duchess of Edinburgh is the charity's Royal Patron. Notable Ambassadors include Simon Weston CBE and Pam Warren.

== History ==
=== Phoenix Appeal ===
Mr Michael Brough was the leading surgeon at the University College Hospital on 18 November 1987, when a wooden escalator at the King's Cross underground station burst into flames. The intense fire in a confined space resulted in 31 deaths; 19 survivors suffered flame burns.

Inspired by his experiences, Brough initiated efforts to improve treatment for the physical and psychological impact of burns. He set up the Phoenix Appeal in 1988 to fund the establishment of the first university department of plastic and reconstructive surgery at University College London.

=== The Healing Foundation ===
In 1998, as Treasurer of the British Association of Plastic, Reconstructive, and Aesthetic Surgeons (BAPRAS), Brough and his fellow Trustees established The Healing Foundation. Building on the groundwork laid by the Phoenix Appeal, The Healing Foundation aimed to advance research into surgical and psychological healing techniques for individuals with disfiguring conditions.

Various UK medical membership bodies provided support to The Healing Foundation as Partner Member Organisations. These partnerships bolstered the charity's credibility, networking capabilities, and financial resources.These organisations were BAPRAS, the British Association of Aesthetic Surgeons, the British Psychological Society, the Craniofacial Society of Great Britain and Ireland, the British Burns Association, and the British Society for Surgery of the Hand.

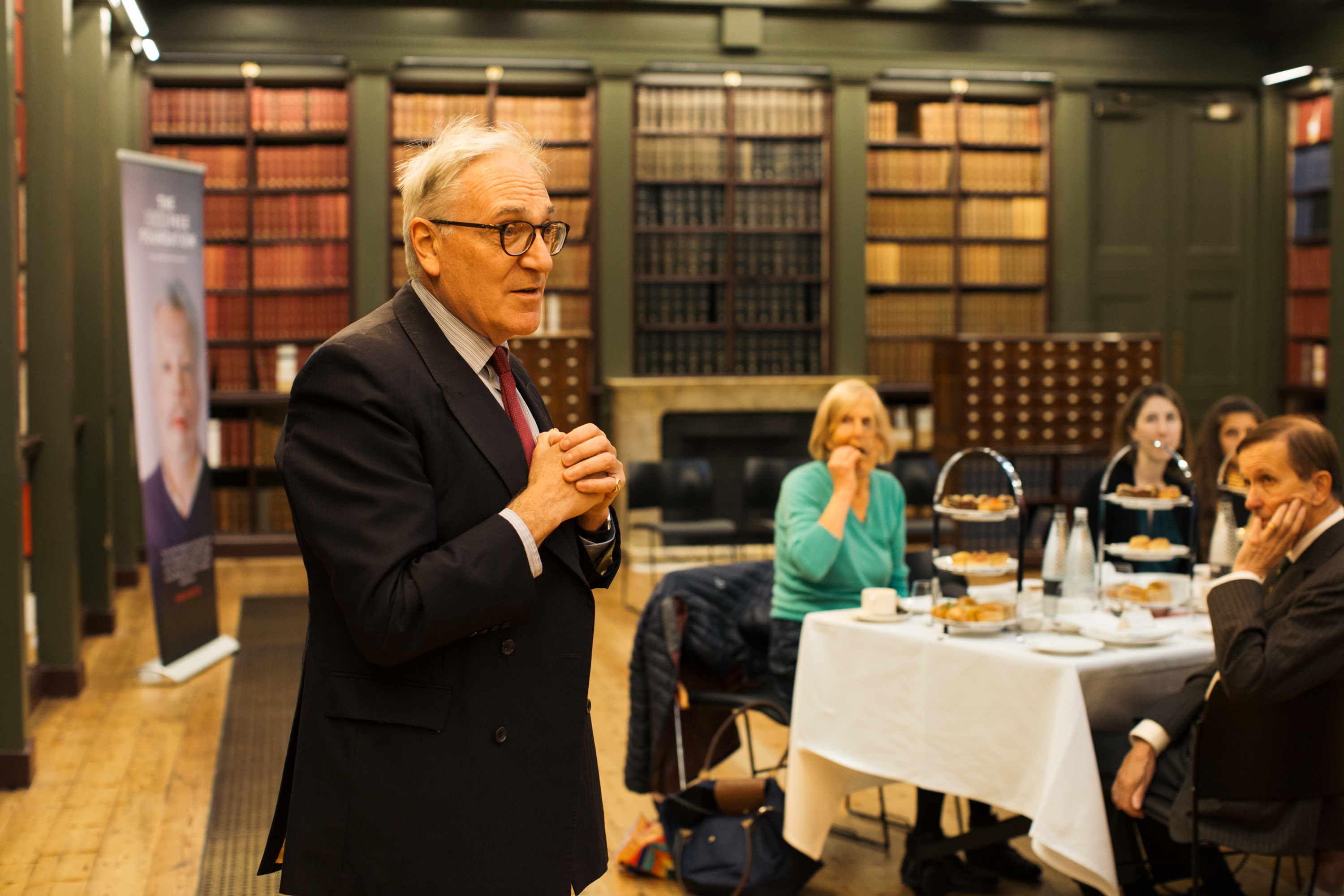
Chief Executive Richard Nugee speaking to Scar Free Foundation Ambassadors at an event at the Royal College of Surgeons in 2023.

John Hart CBE was appointed as the first Director of The Healing Foundation in February 1999. Brendan Eley joined the organisation as Appeal Director in 2001, before being made CEO in 2004.

Notable Research Chairmen for The Healing Foundation include Sir Kenneth Calman and Sir John Temple. Notable Trustees include Sir Stuart Rose and Chris Patten.

=== The Scar Free Foundation ===
In 2016, The Healing Foundation officially rebranded as The Scar Free Foundation. This change was made following a detailed assessment of previous work and future priorities with clinicians, scientists, Partner Member Organisations, and people with lived experience of scarring. The charity pivoted to focus exclusively on wound healing and scarring conditions. A new Research Strategy was developed by a panel chaired by Professor Sir John Iredale.

Brendan Eley was succeeded as CEO by Richard Nugee in April 2023.

== Research centres and major projects ==
The Scar Free Foundation (formerly The Healing Foundation) has co-ordinated research projects in burns, cleft, conflict wounds, and scarring genetics since its inception in 1998. Notable projects include:

=== Burns ===
The Healing Foundation facilitated the establishment of two research centres dedicated to burns. The first, situated at Frenchay Hospital in Bristol, aimed to develop innovative techniques for burn prevention and enhance clinical care for affected children. The Centre for Children's Burns Research was officially opened in June 2013 by Sophie, Duchess of Edinburgh.

Subsequently, another research hub, the Healing Foundation Centre for Burns Research, was inaugurated at Queen Elizabeth Hospital in Birmingham in October 2013.

A notable outcome of The Healing Foundation Centre for Children's Burns Research was the SmartWound PREDICT Dressing, developed by scientists at the University of Bath. This dressing changes colour upon detecting bacteria, providing an alternative method for infection detection.

=== Cleft ===
The Scar Free Foundation initiated the Cleft Collective, a large-scale multigenerational cohort study investigating the causes, treatments, and long-term outcomes of children born with cleft lip and/or palate. With over 10,000 participants recruited from all 16 Cleft Centres in the UK, the project stands as the largest biobank of its kind globally. The collected data is available for researchers from various disciplines, resulting in numerous peer-reviewed publications.

=== Conflict wounds ===
In 2018, the Scar Free Foundation Centre for Conflict Wound Research was established at the Royal Centre for Defence Medicine in Queen Elizabeth Hospital, Birmingham. The centre's studies aim to mitigate the physical and psychological impacts of scarring among servicemen, women, and individuals injured in terrorist attacks. It was established in partnership with the CASEVAC Club, a members organisation similar to the Guinea Pig Club.

=== Regenerative research ===
The Healing Foundation Centre at the University of Manchester was opened in 2007. It was focused on understanding wound healing and tissue regeneration mechanisms, with notable discoveries including the identification of genes activated during tissue regeneration in animals.

Additionally, the Scar Free Foundation co-funded the 3D BioFace project at Swansea University. This ongoing initiative employs 3D bioprinting technology to reconstruct facial cartilage, offering less invasive and more personalised solutions for patients requiring facial reconstruction, such as those with microtia or bosma arhinia microphthalmia syndrome.

=== Psychology ===
The Healing Foundation funded research programs aimed at understanding the psychological impact of visible differences, such as scarring and limb loss from conflict.

Notable projects include the Appearance Research Collaboration, which focused on identifying psychological factors contributing to successful adjustment to life with a visible difference. The result of this programme of research was the publication of CBT-based intervention manual for professionals working with people with visible differences.

Also notable is UNITS, the first study to assess the psychological impact of altered appearance due to scarring and limb loss sustained during military conflict. Led by Dr. Mary Keeling at the University of the West of England, this study aimed to develop tailored support materials for affected veterans and their families.
