= James Swift (British Army officer) =

British Army officer

Lieutenant General James Swift CB OBE
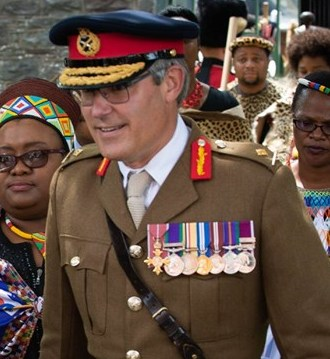
- Swift in 2019
- Born: 6 October 1967 (age 59)
- Military career
- Allegiance: United Kingdom
- Branch: British Army
- Service years: 1989–2023
- Rank: Lieutenant General
- Units: Royal Regiment of Wales; Royal Welsh
- Commands: 3rd (United Kingdom) Division; 20th Armoured Brigade; 2nd Battalion, Royal Welsh
- Conflicts: Iraq War
- Awards: Companion of the Order of the Bath; Officer of the Order of the British Empire

Lieutenant General James Francis Pardoe Swift, CB, OBE (born 6 October 1967) is a retired senior British Army officer.

== Early life and education ==
Swift was born on 6 October 1967 in Bottisham, Cambridgeshire, England. He was educated at Netherhall School and Hills Road Sixth Form College. He studied chemistry at Christ Church, Oxford, graduating with a Bachelor of Arts (BA) degree in 1989; as per tradition, his BA was promoted to a Master of Arts (MA Oxon) degree in 1992.

== Military career ==
Swift was commissioned in to the Royal Regiment of Wales on 1 September 1989. He served as commanding officer of the 2nd Battalion, the Royal Welsh during the Iraq War, for which he was appointed an Officer of the Order of the British Empire (OBE) on 25 July 2008. He became Commander of the 20th Armoured Brigade in May 2012.

Swift was appointed Director of Strategy in March 2016; the post was re-titled as Assistant Chief of the General Staff in September 2018. He became General Officer Commanding the 3rd (United Kingdom) Division in November 2018. It was announced on 30 January 2020 that Swift would become Chief of Defence People (CDP), succeeding Lieutenant General Richard Nugee in late February 2020. Swift was promoted to lieutenant general on 27 February 2020, and retired from the army on 25 April 2023.

Swift was appointed Companion of the Order of the Bath (CB) in the 2023 New Year Honours.

Military offices
Preceded by Rupert Jones	Assistant Chief of the General Staff; 2018–2018	Succeeded by Ralph Wooddisse
Preceded by Nick Borton	General Officer Commanding the 3rd (United Kingdom) Division; 2018–2020	Succeeded by Michael Elviss
Preceded by Richard Nugee	Chief of Defence People; 2020–2023	Succeeded by Philip Hally
