= Ralph Wooddisse =

British Army officer

Lieutenant General Sir Ralph Wooddisse KCB CBE MC
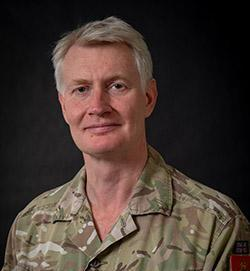
- Wooddisse in 2019
- Born: 8 January 1970 (age 56); Dhekelia, Cyprus
- Military career
- Allegiance: United Kingdom
- Branch: British Army
- Service years: 1989–2026
- Rank: Lieutenant General
- Commands: Allied Rapid Reaction Corps; Field Army; 1st (United Kingdom) Division; 38th (Irish) Brigade; 2nd Battalion, Royal Anglian Regiment
- Conflicts: The Troubles; Bosnian War; Iraq War; War in Afghanistan
- Awards: Knight Commander of the Order of the Bath; Commander of the Order of the British Empire; Military Cross

Lieutenant General Sir Ralph William Wooddisse, KCB, CBE, MC (born 8 January 1970) is a retired British Army officer who served as Commander Field Army from April 2021 until February 2024 and as Commander, Allied Rapid Reaction Corps from March 2024 to April 2026.

== Early life and education ==
Wooddisse was born on 8 January 1970 in Dhekelia, Cyprus. He was educated at Denstone College, a private school in Staffordshire, England. He studied at University College London and underwent officer training at the Royal Military Academy Sandhurst.

== Military career ==
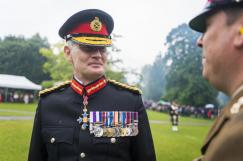
Major General Wooddisse inspecting troops, 2018

Wooddisse was commissioned into the Royal Anglian Regiment on 3 September 1989. He was awarded the Military Cross (MC) on 20 October 1999 in recognition of gallant and distinguished services during operations in Kosovo between January and June that year. He later served as a company commander in Iraq during the Iraq War, was appointed Member of the Order of the British Empire (MBE) in the 2007 Birthday Honours, and became commanding officer of the 2nd Battalion, the Royal Anglian Regiment in March 2009.

Wooddisse went on to be Assistant Head, Military Strategic Plans at the Ministry of Defence in May 2012, commander of 38th (Irish) Brigade in November 2013, and General Officer Commanding 1st (United Kingdom) Division in May 2017. Wooddisse was appointed Commander of the Order of the British Empire (CBE) in the 2017 Birthday Honours, and appointed Assistant Chief of the General Staff in November 2018.

Wooddisse was promoted to lieutenant general and became Commander Field Army on 19 April 2021. He was appointed Knight Commander of the Order of the Bath (KCB) in the 2022 Birthday Honours. He took up the NATO post of Commander, Allied Rapid Reaction Corps in March 2024, serving until April 2026, and retired from the British Army on 6 August 2026.

He was Colonel of the Royal Anglian Regiment until 2023, and a Deputy Colonel Commandant of the Adjutant General's Corps until September 2024. He was appointed Colonel Commandant of the Queen's Division on 1 November 2024, and Colonel of the Ranger Regiment in a new appointment on 30 April 2025.

== Personal life ==
In 2000, Wooddisse married Louise. Together they have three daughters.

Military offices
| Preceded by Giles Hill | General Officer Commanding 1st (United Kingdom) Division; 2017–2018 | Succeeded by Colin Weir |
| Preceded by James Swift | Assistant Chief of the General Staff; 2018–2021 | Succeeded by Nick Perry |
| Preceded by Ivan Jones | Commander Field Army; 2021–2024 | Succeeded by Mike Elviss |
| Preceded by Nick Borton | Commander Allied Rapid Reaction Corps; 2024–2026 | Succeeded by Mike Elviss |
