= Philip Hally =

Royal Navy Vice Admiral

Vice Admiral Philip Hally CB MBE
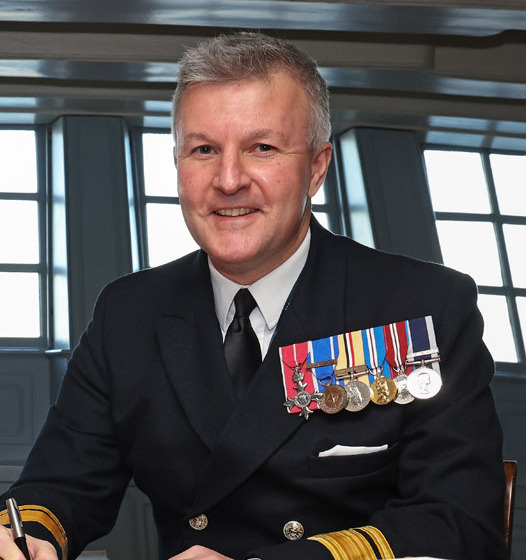
- Rear Admiral Hally in 2022
- Military career
- Allegiance: United Kingdom
- Branch: Royal Navy
- Service years: 1991–2026
- Rank: Vice Admiral
- Commands: Naval Secretary; Chief of Defence People
- Conflicts: Iraq War
- Awards: Companion of the Order of the Bath; Member of the Order of the British Empire

Philip John Hally is a former senior Royal Navy officer, whose last post was as Chief of Defence People from 2023 to 2025.

== Naval career ==
Hally was commissioned in the Royal Navy on 18 September 1991, and was appointed to the Trained Strength in the rank of lieutenant on 3 December 1993.

He was appointed commander logistics on the aircraft carrier HMS Illustrious in 2012, and served as part of the relief effort for Typhoon Haiyan in 2013. He went on to become Programme Leader for the Defence Support Network Transformation Programme in September 2014, Assistant Chief of Staff Resources and Plans in November 2017, and Assistant Chief of the Naval Staff, People Transformation in May 2019. After that, he became Naval Secretary in January 2020. He was promoted to vice-admiral on 12 December 2022, and became Chief of Defence People in January 2023. Hally's post was disestablished under the 2025 Defence Reforms, and he retired from the Royal Navy on 8 April 2026.

Hally was appointed Member of the Order of the British Empire (MBE) on 26 February 2015, and was made an Honorary Captain of the Volunteer Cadet Corps in December 2019. He was appointed Companion of the Order of the Bath (CB) in the 2021 Birthday Honours.

Military offices
Preceded by Michael Bath	Naval Secretary; 2020–2022	Succeeded by Jude Terry
Preceded by James Swift	Chief of Defence People; 2023–2025	Succeeded by Post disestablished
