= Michael Bath =

Naval Secretary of the Royal Navy

Rear Admiral Michael Bath
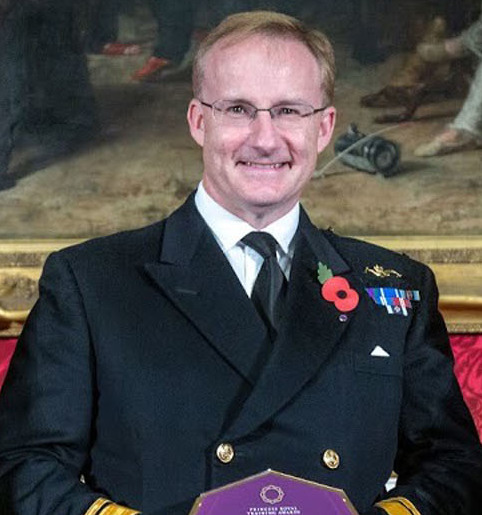
- Michael Bath in 2019
- Born: 1966 (age 59–60)
- Military career
- Allegiance: United Kingdom
- Branch: Royal Navy
- Service years: 1988-2020
- Rank: Rear Admiral
- Nickname: Mike
- Commands: Naval Secretary

Rear-Admiral Michael Anthony William Bath (born 1966) is a retired senior Royal Navy officer who served as Naval Secretary.

== Education ==
He was educated at King Edward VI Five Ways School, the University of Leicester (BSc, 1987) and King's College London (MA Defence Studies).

== Naval career ==
Bath became Assistant Chief of Staff at Permanent Joint Headquarters in October 2009, head of strategy and programmes for the new employment model in April 2012 and Director of Naval Personnel Strategy and Assistant Chief of Staff (People Capability) in January 2015. He went on to be Naval Secretary, Assistant Chief of the Naval Staff (Personnel) and Flag Officer, Reserves in June 2018. Bath retired from the Royal Navy and is now Executive Director of People and Organisational Development at Marie Curie UK. Bath retired from the Royal Navy on 1 May 2020.

Military offices
Preceded by Simon Williams	Naval Secretary; 2018–2020	Succeeded by Philip Hally
