= Richard Nugee =

British Army officer (born 1963)

Lieutenant General Richard Nugee CB CVO CBE
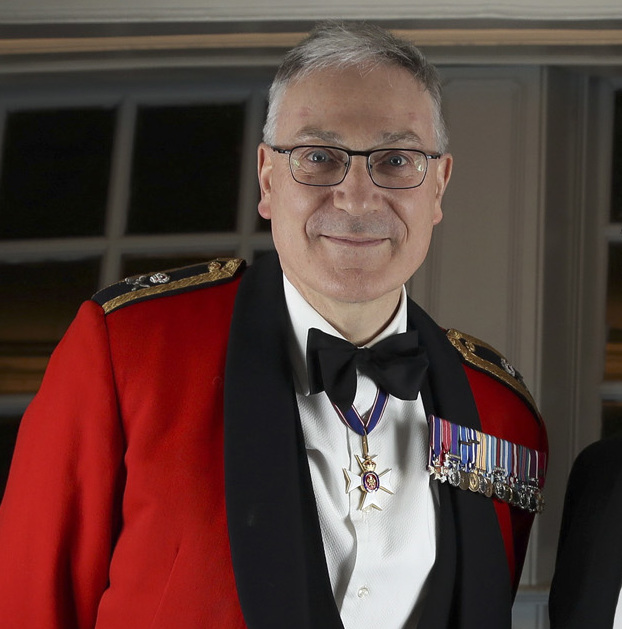
- Nugee in 2017
- Born: 3 June 1963 (age 63); Hampstead, London, England
- Relatives: Edward Nugee (father); Sir Christopher Nugee (brother); Emily Thornberry (sister-in-law)
- Military career
- Allegiance: United Kingdom
- Branch: British Army
- Service years: 1985–2021
- Rank: Lieutenant General
- Service number: 515778
- Unit: Royal Artillery
- Commands: 40th Regiment Royal Artillery
- Conflicts: Iraq War; War in Afghanistan
- Awards: Companion of the Order of the Bath; Commander of the Royal Victorian Order; Commander of the Order of the British Empire; Legion of Merit (United States)

Lieutenant General Richard Edward Nugee, CB, CVO, CBE (born 3 June 1963) is a retired senior British Army officer. He served in several senior roles including Defence Services Secretary (2015–2016) and Chief of Defence People (2016–2020), before ending his career leading a review into climate change policy in the Ministry of Defence between March 2020 and May 2021.

== Early life and education ==
Nugee was born on 3 June 1963 in Hampstead, England. He is the son of Edward Nugee, a notable barrister, and his wife Rachel, a Bletchley codebreaker and active lay Anglican. He was educated at Radley College, an all-boys public school near Radley, Oxfordshire. He studied anthropology at Durham University, where he was a member of Grey College, and graduated with a Bachelor of Arts (BA) degree in 1985. He later studied military affairs at King's College London, and completed a Master of Arts (MA) degree in 1995.

== Military career ==
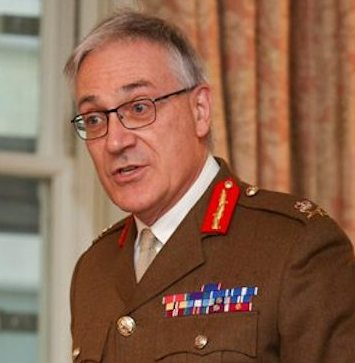
Nugee in 2020

Nugee was commissioned into the Royal Artillery in 1985. He became commanding officer of 40th Regiment Royal Artillery in 2003 and was deployed to Iraq in that role. Promoted to brigadier, he was deployed with Headquarters Allied Rapid Reaction Corps to Afghanistan in 2006.

He went on to be Director of Manning (Army) in March 2009, Director General of Army Personnel in June 2012 and Chief of Staff (Operations) in October 2013: in the latter role he was deployed as Chief of Staff, Combined Force Command, Afghanistan in November 2013. He was appointed Defence Services Secretary and Assistant Chief of Defence Staff (Personnel) in March 2015. Nugee was awarded the US Legion of Merit in the Degree of Officer on 18 March 2016 for services in Afghanistan.

Nugee was promoted to lieutenant general on 29 April 2016. On 12 May 2016, it was announced that Nugee would become the next Chief of Defence People. Nugee handed over to then Major-General James Swift in February 2020. Since March 2020, he has led a review into climate change policy and sustainability in the Ministry of Defence. Nugee retired from the army on 12 May 2021.

He was a Colonel Commandant of the Royal Regiment of Artillery from 8 June 2012 until 21 April 2023.

Nugee was appointed a Commander of the Order of the British Empire (CBE) in the 2012 New Year Honours, a Commander of the Royal Victorian Order (CVO) in the 2016 Special Honours, and a Companion of the Order of the Bath (CB) in the 2020 New Year Honours.

Nugee is the current Chief Executive of The Scar Free Foundation, a medical research charity. He is also Chairman of Uplift360, a clean tech startup producing advanced materials from composite waste, achieved through the development of their novel chemical technology.

Military offices
| Preceded by Simon Williams | Defence Services Secretary; 2015–2016 | Succeeded by Garry Tunnicliffe |
| Preceded by Andrew Gregory | Chief of Defence People; 2016–2020 | Succeeded by James Swift |
