= Andrew Gregory (British Army officer) =

British Army general

Lieutenant General Sir Andrew Gregory KBE CB DL
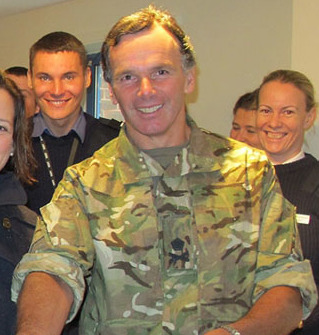
- Lieutenant General Gregory in 2013
- Born: 19 November 1957 (age 68); Glasgow, Scotland
- Military career
- Allegiance: United Kingdom
- Branch: British Army
- Service years: 1981–2016
- Rank: Lieutenant General
- Conflicts: Iraq War
- Awards: Knight Commander of the Order of the British Empire; Companion of the Order of the Bath

Lieutenant General Sir Andrew Richard Gregory KBE CB DL (born 19 November 1957) is a retired British Army officer who served as Deputy Chief of the Defence Staff. In September 2016, he became Controller SSAFA, The Armed Forces charity. He was Master Gunner, St James's Park, from 2017 to 2025.

== Early life and education ==
Gregory was born on 19 November 1957 to Lieutenant Colonel Richard B. Gregory and Alison Gregory (née Egerton). He was educated at Sedbergh School, and studied engineering at St John's College, Cambridge.

== Military career ==
Gregory was commissioned into the Royal Artillery in 1981. As a brigadier, he served in Iraq as Commander Royal Artillery, 1st (United Kingdom) Armoured Division. Promoted to major general in 2007, Gregory was appointed Collocation Implementation Team Leader for the amalgamation of Land Command and Headquarters Adjutant-General at Andover, which took place in April 2008. He became Director General, Personnel later that year, Military Secretary in February 2011, and Deputy Chief of the Defence Staff (Personnel and Training) with promotion to lieutenant-general in April 2013. This role has since been re-designated Chief of the Defence People.

Gregory retired from the army on 16 August 2016.

== Later life ==
In September 2016, Gregory became Controller of SSAFA, The Armed Forces charity. He was Colonel Commandant of the Royal Artillery until 1 November 2025, and Master Gunner, St James's Park from 1 May 2017 to October 2025, and was appointed Vice Lord-Lieutenant of Wiltshire on 16 January 2023.

== Honours ==
In 2010, Gregory was appointed a Companion of the Order of the Bath (CB). In the 2016 Birthday Honours, he was appointed Knight Commander of the Order of the British Empire (KBE).

Military offices
Preceded by David Rutherford-Jones	Military Secretary; 2011–2013	Succeeded by Shaun Burley
Preceded by Sir William Rollo	Chief of Defence Personnel; 2013–2016	Succeeded by Richard Nugee
Honorary titles
Preceded by Sir Timothy Granville-Chapman	Master Gunner, St. James's Park; 2017–2025	Succeeded by Michael Elviss
