= Ivan Jones (British Army officer) =

British Army officer (born 1966)

Lieutenant General Ivan Jones CB
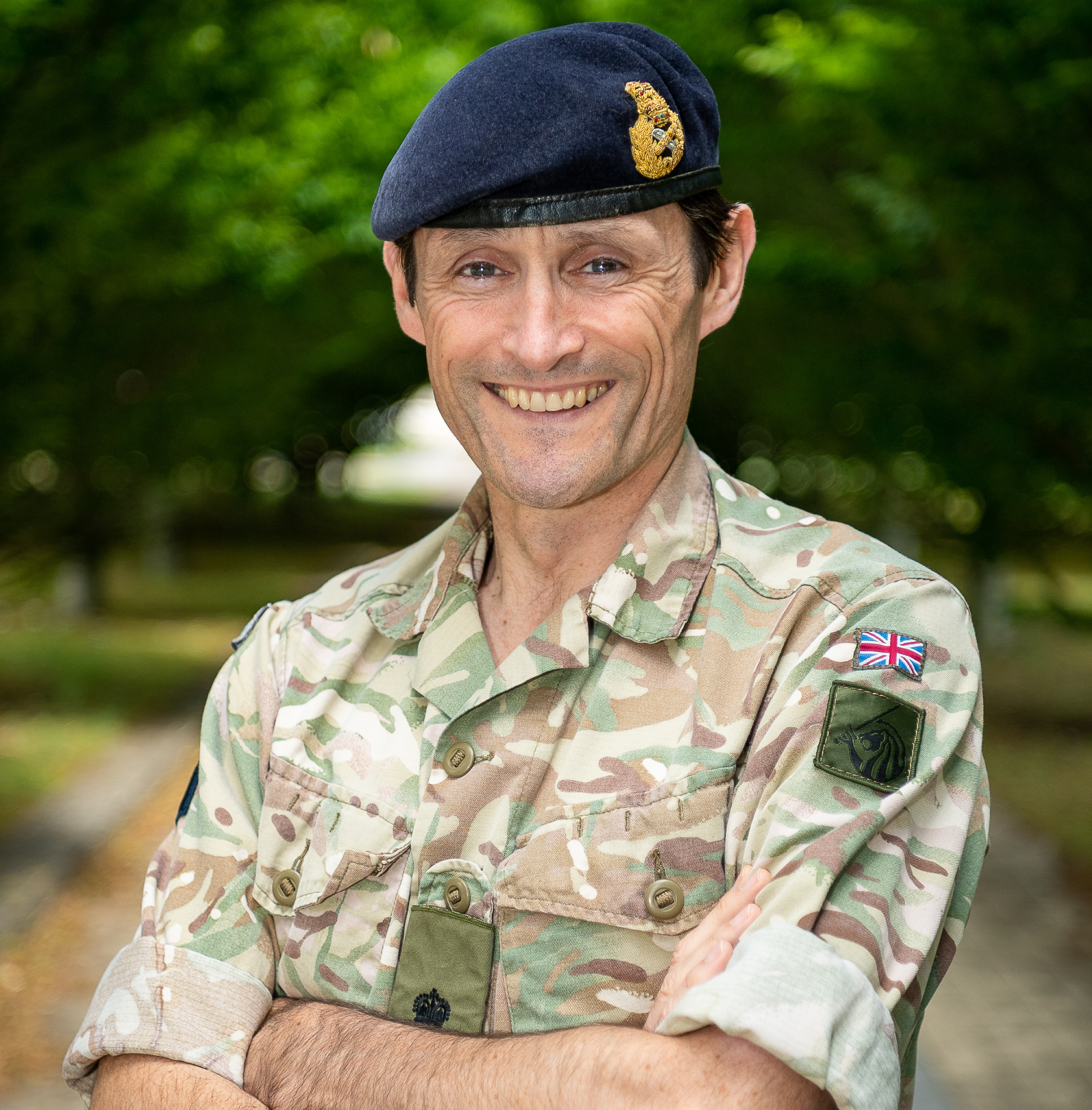
- Jones in 2019
- Born: September 1966; Bristol, England
- Military career
- Allegiance: United Kingdom
- Branch: British Army
- Service years: 1986–2021
- Rank: Lieutenant General
- Commands: Field Army; 8th Force Engineer Brigade; 26 Engineer Regiment
- Conflicts: Bosnian War; War in Afghanistan; Iraq War
- Awards: Companion of the Order of the Bath; Queen's Commendation for Valuable Service

Lieutenant General Ivan Bartholomew Leonard Jones, CB (born September 1966) is a retired senior British Army officer.

== Military career ==
Jones was commissioned into the Royal Electrical and Mechanical Engineers on 7 September 1986 and transferred to the Royal Engineers on 26 October 1988. He was appointed commanding officer of 26 Engineer Regiment and, in that role, saw active service in Afghanistan in 2007, for he received the Queen's Commendation for Valuable Service in 2008.

Jones became Commander 8th Force Engineer Brigade in October 2011, Chief of Joint Force Operations from September 2013 and Chief of Staff, Field Army in November 2015. That month, Jones was appointed as Colonel Commandant of the Royal Engineers, and held the position until 1 November 2020.

Jones went on to be Director-General, Army Personnel in May 2018, was appointed a Companion of the Order of the Bath in the 2018 Birthday Honours, and became Commander Field Army, with the substantive rank of lieutenant general, on 20 March 2019. He retired from the army in April 2021 and was succeeded by Lieutenant General Ralph Wooddisse as Commander Field Army.

He was Honorary Colonel of the Engineer and Logistic Staff Corps Army Reserve until 1 July 2024, and a Colonel Commandant of the Adjutant General's Corps until late 2024.

Military offices
Preceded by Patrick Sanders	Commander Field Army; 2019–2021	Succeeded by Ralph Wooddisse
