= Simon Williams (Royal Navy officer) =

Royal Navy Rear Admiral (born 1960)

Rear Admiral Simon Williams CB CVO KStJ
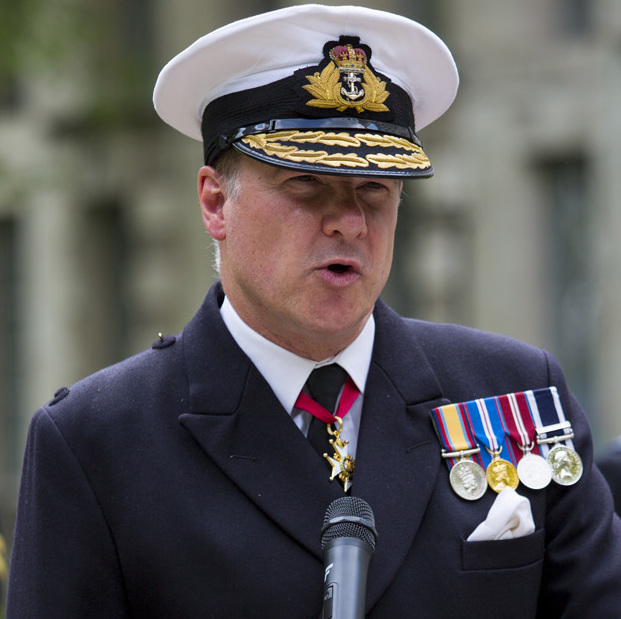
- Admiral Williams in 2018
- Born: 13 July 1960 (age 66); Bristol, Gloucestershire
- Military career
- Allegiance: United Kingdom
- Branch: Royal Navy
- Service years: 1978–2018
- Rank: Rear Admiral
- Commands: Naval Secretary; HMS Cornwall; HMS Sheffield; HMS Brecon
- Conflicts: Gulf War
- Awards: Companion of the Order of the Bath; Commander of the Royal Victorian Order; Knight of the Order of St John

Rear Admiral Simon Paul Williams, CB, CVO, KStJ (born 13 July 1960), is a retired senior Royal Navy officer who served as Naval Secretary, Assistant Chief of Naval Staff (Personnel) and Flag Officer (Maritime Reserves) from March 2015 to June 2018.

Since 2025, Williams serves as Prior of St John in England.

== Early life and education ==
Born in 1960 at Bristol, Williams was educated at Kingsbridge School, the City University London (BSc) and the Britannia Royal Naval College.

== Naval career ==
Williams was commissioned into the Royal Navy in 1978. After taking charge of the minesweeper HMS Brecon, he was promoted Commanding Officer of the frigate HMS Sheffield in 2001 and of the frigate HMS Cornwall in 2005.

Williams became Director of Naval Personnel Strategy at the Ministry of Defence in 2008, Commodore of the Britannia Royal Naval College in March 2011 and then Defence Services Secretary as well as Assistant Chief of the Defence Staff (Personnel and Training) in October 2012. He went on to be Naval Secretary, Assistant Chief of Naval Staff (Personnel) and Flag Officer (Maritime Reserves) in March 2015.

== Honours and awards ==
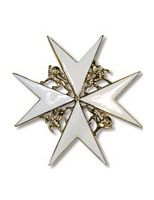
KStJ breast star

- Companion of the Order of the Bath (2017)
- Commander of the Royal Victorian Order (2015)
- Knight of the Order of St John (2025)
  - Officer of the Order of St John (2024)

Appointed Chancellor of the Priory of England and Islands of the Order of St John in 2023, Williams was promoted Prior of St John in 2025.

== Family ==
Williams is the son of Philip Williams and June née Winterton, a kinswoman of Baroness Winterton of Doncaster.

Military offices
Preceded by David Murray	Defence Services Secretary; 2012–2015	Succeeded by Richard Nugee
Preceded by Jonathan Woodcock	Naval Secretary; 2015–2018	Succeeded by Michael Bath
Court offices
Preceded by Stuart Shilson	Prior of the Order of Saint John; 2025–present	Succeeded by in office
