= Edward Nugee =

English barrister (1928–2014)

Edward Nugee QC TD
- Born: Edward George Nugee; 9 August 1928; Godalming, Surrey, England
- Died: 30 December 2014 (aged 86)
- Education: Radley College
- Alma mater: Worcester College, Oxford
- Occupation: Barrister
- Years active: 1955–2014
- Spouse: Rachel Makower (m. 1955)
- Children: John; Christopher; Andrew; Richard
- Military career
- Allegiance: United Kingdom
- Branch: British Army
- Service years: 1950–1964
- Rank: Captain
- Service number: 423642
- Units: Royal Artillery; Intelligence Corps
- Awards: Territorial Decoration

Edward George "Ted" Nugee QC TD (9 August 1928 – 30 December 2014) was an English barrister. Nugee was described in his London Times obituary as "one of the pre-eminent Chancery barristers of his generation". He was involved in number of significant cases on tax and pensions, as well as being a regularly published correspondent in letters to the editor of The Times.

== Early life, education and military service ==
Born in 1928 at Godalming, Surrey, he was the eldest son of Brigadier George Nugee CBE, DSO, MC, and his wife, Violet Mary née Richards.

Nugee attended Brambletye School in East Grinstead and Radley College in Oxfordshire, from where he won a scholarship to Worcester College, Oxford, to read Classics. Before going up to Oxford University he spent two years on National Service as a gunner in the Royal Artillery, and served in Singapore during the Malayan Emergency. Upon his return to Oxford, Nugee reportedly realised that he had not seen a Latin or Greek text for two years and so abandoned Classics in favour of Jurisprudence. He graduated with a double first, and in 1953 was awarded the Eldon Law Scholarship.

After National Service, Nugee joined the Territorial Army being commissioned into the Intelligence Corps in April 1952. Promoted to the rank of Captain in May 1955, Nugee was awarded the Territorial Decoration in July 1964, before retiring from the Intelligence Corps in November 1964.

== Law ==
He was called to the bar in 1955 at the Inner Temple and became a pupil at 2 New Square in Lincoln's Inn, but soon thereafter moved to chambers at 3 New Square, later known as Wilberforce Chambers. He remained there in practice for nearly 60 years until his death, principally in the areas of pensions and tax, and was head of chambers for over 30 years. He was Treasurer of the Inner Temple in 1996.

In 1962, Nugee was asked to join the legal team advising the Colonial Office on administrative issues in Uganda, then a British protectorate and soon to become independent. His role was to advise on the boundaries of traditional areas and tribal domains; he took great pleasure in researching the pre-colonial administration of the Baganda people, taking evidence from elders who could personally remember the period before the British arrived in 1898, and was instrumental in advising the Colonial Office to restore to the Baganda people authority over some of their traditional territory.

In 1967 Nugee was made a Junior Counsel for the Land Commission. From 1968 to 1977 he was Counsel for Litigation under the Commons Registration Act 1965. He was also Conveyancing Counsel to the Treasury, the Defence Department, the Ministry of Agriculture & Fisheries and the Forestry Commission. He was appointed Queen's Counsel in 1977.

In addition to his practice Nugee did a great deal of work for the Family Welfare Association, the Mothers' Union, the London Citizens' Advice Bureau, and for Poor Man’s Lawyer in Lewisham.

He also served on the Council of Legal Education from 1967 to 1990, and assisted the Law Commission.

Between 1982 and 1997 he often sat as a Deputy High Court Judge in the Chancery Division.

In 1984 he was appointed chairman of an inquiry set up by the minister of housing into the management problems of privately owned blocks of flats. This resulted in the Landlord and Tenant Act 1987.

In 2011 he was awarded a “Lifetime Achievement” Award for service to the legal profession by a publisher of a legal directory, Chambers and Partners.

== Personal life ==
In 1955, Nugee met and married Rachel Elizabeth Makower, who had worked as a code breaker at Bletchley Park during the Second World War. They had four sons, including Sir Christopher Nugee and Lt-Gen Richard Nugee.

With his wife, he attended St John-at-Hampstead Church, latterly becoming a member of its Parochial Church Council. Nugee served as a Church Commissioner between 1990 and 2001 and on the Legal Advisory Commission of the General Synod dealing with issues of ecclesiastical law. Nugee inherited the family patronages of the livings of East Farndon, Farlington as well as the joint parish of Wymering & Cosham, a responsibility he took seriously and discharged for the remainder of his life. Chairman of the Board of Governors of Brambletye from 1972 until 1977, he also served on Radley College Council for 20 years until 1997, and as a council member of the Huguenot Society of Great Britain and Ireland, through which he traced the Nugee family's history back to Huguenot refugees in the 17th century.
