= Simon Weston =

Welsh soldier and charity worker

Simon Weston CBE
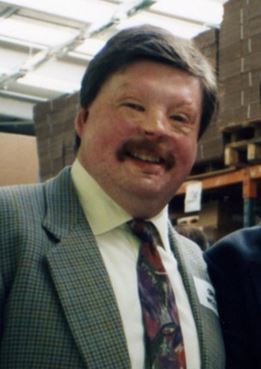
- Weston in 2008
- Born: 8 August 1961 (age 65); Caerphilly, Glamorgan, Wales
- Spouse: Lucy Titherington (m. 1990)
- Children: 3
- Military career
- Allegiance: United Kingdom
- Branch: British Army
- Service years: 1978–1982
- Unit: Welsh Guards
- Conflicts: Falklands War
- Awards: Commander of the Order of the British Empire
- Other work: Charity work, particularly for the disfigured and wounded in action

Simon Weston (born 8 August 1961) is a Welsh veteran of the British Army who is known for his charity work and recovery from severe burn injuries suffered during the Falklands War.

== Early life ==
Weston was born at Caerphilly District Miners Hospital in Caerphilly. He was brought up by his mother, Pauline and adoptive father, "Lofty". His biological father David Weston served in the Royal Air Force alongside his mother. Simon lived in Singapore and at RAF Hospital Nocton Hall in Lincolnshire before returning to Nelson at the age of around six or seven. He has one elder sister, Helen, and three stepbrothers. At the age of 14, Weston was given a police caution when he was caught as a passenger in a car stolen by his older friends.

He joined the Welsh Guards in 1978 at the age of 16 at the insistence of his mother, after he "got into bother". He served in Berlin, Northern Ireland and Kenya before being deployed to the Falkland Islands.

== Falklands War ==
On 8 June 1982, Weston was embarked with other members of his regiment in RFA Sir Galahad in Port Pleasant near Fitzroy, just off the Falkland Islands. Sir Galahad was bombed and set on fire by Argentine Skyhawk fighters during the Bluff Cove Air Attacks. The ship was carrying ammunition as well as phosphorus bombs and thousands of gallons of diesel and petrol. Out of his platoon of 30 men, 22 were killed. The Welsh Guards lost a total of 48 men killed and 97 wounded aboard the Sir Galahad.

Weston survived with 46% burns, following which his face was barely recognisable. He said:

My first encounter with a really low point was when they wheeled me into the transit hospital at RAF Lyneham and I passed my mother in the corridor and she said to my gran, "Oh mam, look at that poor boy" and I cried out "Mam, it's me!" As she recognised my voice her face turned to stone.

== Recovery ==
Weston endured years of reconstructive surgery, including over 96 major operations or surgical procedures. Skin from his shoulders was used to make eyelids, and skin grafts also repaired healing contraction to his nose. He suffered psychological trauma, drinking heavily and becoming suicidal, and admits his behaviour during this time was "terrible". He credits his mother with helping him to overcome this, in particular her act of reuniting him with his old regiment. The men of his regiment refused to mollycoddle him (especially Glen White, who ran the Welsh Guards rugby side), which forced him to "face up to the unavoidable and to be positive about everything including especially my future".

== Television and media ==
Weston has made regular contributions to radio programmes and appeared on television, especially within Wales. He has been the subject of several BBC documentaries and presented his own radio show Face for the Radio for BBC Radio Wales. He has been interviewed on many occasions for television news programmes and documentaries recounting his experiences, including appearances on 14 June 2007, the 25th anniversary of the Falklands War ending. He has also appeared on programmes such as This Is Your Life (appearing on 7 February 1990; aged only 28, Weston was one of the show's youngest-ever guests) and later Who Wants to Be a Millionaire? He was featured in a £7 million advertising campaign launched in 2000 aimed at boosting recruitment into the police force.

He has written best-selling autobiographies, as well as a series of novels. In 2003, he announced that he had been in talks over plans to make a film about his life.

== Charity work ==
In 1986, Weston undertook his first goodwill tour, to Australia, at the request of the Guards Association of Australasia. The resulting donations to children's burns units made him begin to feel useful again.

Weston became patron of a number of charities that support people living with disfigurements. He is the Lead Ambassador for medical research charity, The Scar Free Foundation, which funds research into scar free healing. He also set up a national youth charity, Weston Spirit, in 1988 with Paul Oginsky and Ben Harrison, shortly after moving to Liverpool. However, in 2008, the charity suffered from financial difficulties and had to be shut down.

Weston is also a patron of the LMS-Patriot Project. The Project is constructing a new replica LMS Patriot Class steam locomotive, number 5551 The Unknown Warrior. On 10 November 2018, in a ceremony at Crewe Heritage Centre he unveiled the locomotives new crest which would be carried above the locomotives nameplates (the previous one being the Royal British Legion crest which the RBL later asked to be removed from the engine).

== Political activism ==
Weston has campaigned in support of troops and veterans and against politicians' failure to support them adequately. He has spoken out against defence budget cuts and about British troops allegedly being supplied with inadequate equipment, and about the lack of support, health care and adequate compensation for veterans. On 12 March 2007, he appeared on ITV News, giving his opinion on the care of British soldiers in hospital. On 4 March 2008, he appeared alongside Conservative leader David Cameron as he announced the formation of a commission to investigate ways to help restore the "military covenant", which Cameron called "well and truly broken". It was intended that Weston would take a non-partisan, advisory role to the commission (headed by Frederick Forsyth), with his work having a particular focus on the treatment of veterans and compensation paid out to injured service personnel.

It is stated that Weston is a critic of the Iraq War, believing Tony Blair's arguments for the invasion were invalid. In February 2003, in the run-up to the war, he spoke out about "politicians with so many different agendas, spin and bluff and throwing smoke in the air and I have to say even lies ... so often that we are not sure what we are actually listening to now".

Weston also spoke to the ethical committee at London's Royal Free Hospital in 2006 to support the case for authorising full face transplants, even though he had previously been against the idea.

In 2008, Weston criticised the then French president, Nicolas Sarkozy, for omitting the contribution of Wales in a speech commemorating the First World War. Weston said "He should have got it right ... We in Wales have lost and sacrificed as much as anybody for different causes." Showing his support for the British monarchy, Weston added, "Not for a second would Charles have disrespected the event. He has always acted with a great deal of reverence for the occasion."

In February 2012, Weston was caught up in an angry exchange with actor Sean Penn, who said it was improper for Prince William to be deployed to the Falklands. Weston was reported as saying, "Sean Penn does not know what he is talking about and, frankly, he should shut up. His [Penn's] views are irrelevant and it only serves to fuel the fire of the Argentinians and get them more pumped up."

In 2012, Weston decided to stand for the post of elected Police and Crime Commissioner for the South Wales Police. As part of the nomination process, he had to disclose the police caution he had received as a child and whether this caution disbarred him from standing became a matter of public debate. He withdrew from the process, citing this controversy and the perceived politicisation of the post (some sources hold that a caution for a juvenile should not be grounds for disqualification). During a BBC radio interview on the subject of the disclosure of cautions to juveniles, Weston pointed out that he has never sought to hide the caution.

== Personal life ==
Weston is married to Lucy, with whom he has three children: James, Stuart and Caitlin. They met in Liverpool when she was working for his charity, Weston Spirit. They were engaged on 8 June 1989, exactly seven years after the attack on the Sir Galahad. They married on 12 May 1990 and now live in Cardiff.

Weston has met and become friends with First Lieutenant Carlos Cachon, the Argentine pilot who dropped the bomb which caused his injuries. He was criticised for this by families of those who fought in the Falklands War, which he dismissed by saying "I don't have a problem with other people criticising me for things I do, as long as people understand why I did them. Then I don't have a problem to walk away and say 'you're entitled to your opinions'."

== Honours and awards ==
The medals Weston received for his military service include the General Service Medal with "Northern Ireland" clasp and the South Atlantic Medal with rosette.

His courage and charity work have been recognised and honoured on a number of occasions. He was appointed Officer of the Order of the British Empire (OBE) in the 1992 Birthday Honours and Commander of the Order of the British Empire (CBE) in the 2016 New Year Honours for charitable services. In 2002, he was awarded the Freedom of the City of Liverpool. In 2004, he was named one of the top 100 Welsh heroes. In 2005, he was made an Honorary Fellow of Cardiff University. In 2006, Weston and dual code (Rugby league and Rugby union) international David Watkins were installed as patrons of the Wales Rugby League, in a ceremony held in the Welsh Assembly.

In 2008, he received an Honorary Doctorate from Heriot-Watt University.

In September 2009, he agreed to be President Elect of the Welsh Scout Council, and was formally introduced at the council's annual general meeting at Llandrindod Wells on 31 October.
