= Andrew Baker (judge) =

British judge (born 1965)

The Honourable Mr Justice Andrew Baker
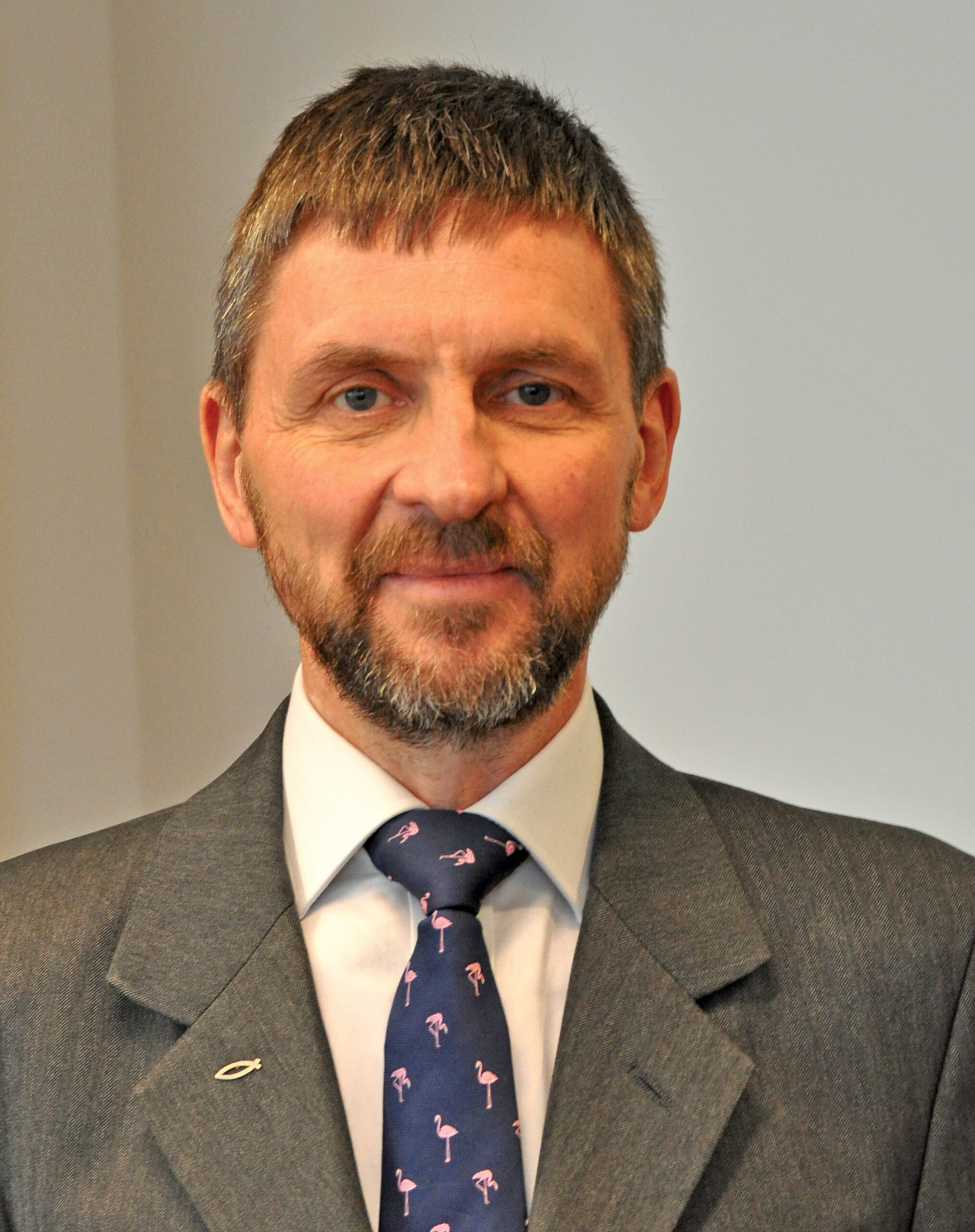
- Baker in 2022

Justice of the High Court
- Incumbent
- Assumed office 1 November 2016
- Monarchs: Elizabeth II; Charles III

Personal details
- Born: 21 December 1965 (age 60)
- Education: Merton College, Oxford

Sir Andrew William Baker (born 21 December 1965), styled The Hon. Mr Justice Andrew Baker, is a judge of the High Court of England and Wales. He is currently Judge in Charge of the Admiralty Court.

== Biography ==
He was educated at Lenzie Academy, read mathematics at Merton College, Oxford, and completed a postgraduate diploma in law at City, University of London.

He was called to the bar at Lincoln's Inn in 1988. He was made a judge of the High Court of Justice (King's Bench Division) in 2016 and invested a knight in the 2016 Special Honours. He is correctly described as Mr Justice Andrew Baker, distinguishing him from other judges, including Jeremy Baker, with the same surname.

In April 2021, he dismissed a billion-dollar lawsuit against British financier Sanjay Shah and several other people. The Danish Tax Agency raised the case in 2018.
