= Nick Borton =

British army officer (born 1969)

Lieutenant General Sir Nick Borton KCB DSO MBE
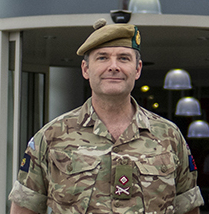
- Major General Borton in 2019
- Born: 1969 (age 56–57)
- Military career
- Allegiance: United Kingdom
- Branch: British Army
- Service years: 1988–2024
- Rank: Lieutenant General
- Unit: Royal Highland Fusiliers
- Commands: Allied Rapid Reaction Corps; 3rd (United Kingdom) Division; 16 Air Assault Brigade; Royal Highland Fusiliers, 2nd Battalion, The Royal Regiment of Scotland
- Conflicts: United Nations Protection Force; The Troubles; Iraq War; War in Afghanistan
- Awards: Knight Commander of the Order of the Bath; Distinguished Service Order; Member of the Order of the British Empire

Lieutenant General Sir Nicholas Robert Macrae Borton, KCB, DSO, MBE (born 1969), is a retired British Army officer, who served as commander of NATO's Allied Rapid Reaction Corps from 2021 to 2024.

== Early life and education ==
Borton was born in 1969 in London, England. His father and a grandfather had served in the Highland Light Infantry. He was educated at Canford School, an independent boarding school in Dorset, England. He went on to study history and English literature at the University of Stirling, graduating with a Bachelor of Arts (BA) degree in 1991. He would later study for a Master of Arts degree in defence management and technology at the Royal Military College of Science.

== Military career ==
Borton was commissioned into the Royal Highland Fusiliers on 4 September 1988. After serving as a Staff Officer at the headquarters of Multi-National Division (South-East) (Iraq), then Commanding Officer of the Royal Highland Fusiliers, 2nd Battalion, The Royal Regiment of Scotland in 2008, Borton was awarded the Distinguished Service Order (DSO) on 6 March 2009 for his military service in Afghanistan. He was appointed commander of 16 Air Assault Brigade in April 2013, and Director of Overseas Operations at the Ministry of Defence in September 2015.

Borton was appointed General Officer Commanding the 3rd (United Kingdom) Division in December 2016. and then became Chief of Staff (Operations), Permanent Joint Headquarters in February 2019. He was appointed commander of the Allied Rapid Reaction Corps in December 2021, and was promoted to lieutenant general on 16 December 2021. He handed over the responsibility of the corps to Sir Ralph Wooddisse in early 2024, and retired from the army on 15 June 2024.

Borton was Regimental Colonel of the Royal Regiment of Scotland until March 2024, and is Colonel Commandant of the Army Air Corps. He was appointed Knight Commander of the Order of the Bath (KCB) in the 2023 Birthday Honours.

== Publications ==
- Borton, N. R. M. (19 October 2007) [2002]. "The 14th Army in Burma: A Case Study in Delivering Fighting Power". Defence Studies. 2 (3): 27–52. doi:10.1080/14702430208405039.

Military offices
Preceded by Sir Patrick Sanders	General Officer Commanding the 3rd (United Kingdom) Division; 2016–2018	Succeeded by James Swift
Preceded by Sir Edward Smyth-Osbourne	Commander Allied Rapid Reaction Corps; 2021–2024	Succeeded by Sir Ralph Wooddisse
