= Chief of Defence People =

Senior appointment in the British Armed Forces

Car flag of the Chief of Defence Personnel

The Chief of Defence People was the senior military officer in the British Armed Forces responsible for the policies and processes concerning the management of British military personnel across the Royal Navy, British Army, Royal Air Force and Ministry of Defence civil service. It was created by re-designating the Deputy Chief of the Defence Staff (Personnel and Training) in 2013, the post was initially titled as the Chief of Defence Personnel. In April 2014, MOD civilian personnel policy was added to the post's responsibility. This post was disestablished under the Defence Reforms in 2025.

== Chiefs of Defence Personnel ==
- 2013–2016: Lieutenant-General Andrew Gregory

== Chiefs of Defence People ==
- 2016–2020: Lieutenant General Richard Nugee
- 2020–2023: Lieutenant General James Swift
- 2023–2025: Vice Admiral Philip Hally
