= Clinical Senate =

Non-statutory body of the English NHS

Clinical Senates are non-statutory bodies of the English NHS, established by the Health and Social Care Act 2012.

== Description ==
Clinical senates were established by the English NHSas multi-professional clinical leadership groups from April 2013 onward to "help clinical commissioning groups (CCGs), health and wellbeing boards (HWBs) and the NHS NHS Commissioning Board to make the best decisions about healthcare for the populations they represent by providing advice and leadership at a strategic level".

There are 8 Clinical Senates across England based upon the NHS England region's: East of England, East Midlands, West Midlands, Northern England, Yorkshire and Humber, London, North West, South East, South West,.
