= Sheila Leatherman =

Sheila Tayback Leatherman, Hon. CBE, Hon FRCP (born November 1951) is Professor in Global Health (2000 to present) at the University of North Carolina UNC Gillings School of Global Public Health whose professional experience stretches across the breadth of health care management, public health and health policy with expertise in quality of care, performance improvement in the health sector, and health systems reforms. She has worked with over 50 countries globally.

Currently, as a Lead Advisor to the World Health Organization (WHO), she develops the academic and technical foundations for WHO support of Member States in the development of national health care quality strategies to improve health service delivery and patient outcomes. Her current research focuses on improving health care in fragile, conflict-affected and vulnerable (FCV) countries and humanitarian settings.

She has received honors and awards for her contributions to improvements in quality of care globally. She was elected to the U.S. National Academy of Sciences in 2002 as a member of the National Academy of Medicine. In 2007 she was awarded the honor of Commander of the British Empire (CBE) by Queen Elizabeth II for her work in the National Health Service for over a decade and was appointed an Honorary Fellow of the Royal College of Physicians (FRCP) in the UK in 2008. In 2019, she received the Presidential Distinction Award of the International Society for Quality in recognition of her work in low- and medium-income countries.

Her public service includes the Global Polio Eradication Initiative Transition Monitoring Board, the Board of advisors of MSF-USA, the Board of Directors of QuestScope (Middle East NGO) and Board of Directors of FHI 360.

== Honors ==
Professor Leatherman was awarded an honorary CBE in 2007 for a decade of service in research on the NHS.

== Publications ==
She was commissioned by the Nuffield Trust to assess the UK Government's quality reforms for the NHS in 1997-98 and evaluated the mid-term impact of the ten year quality agenda in the NHS The Quest for Quality in the NHS (published in 2003) and Quest for Quality in the NHS: A Chartbook on Quality in the UK (published in 2005), and Refining the NHS Reforms (2008).

Among over 100 peer reviewed publications, are these recently published:

- Leatherman S, Berwick D "Accelerating Global Improvements in Health Care Quality" JAMA. 2020;324(24):2479-2480. doi:10.1001/jama.2020.17628
- Leatherman S, Syed S, Neilson M, "Quality of care in fragile, conflict-affected and vulnerable settings: taking action". World Health Organization. License: CC BY-NC-SA 3.0 IGO
- Kelley E, Klazinga N, Forde I, Veillard J, Leatherman S, et al. Delivering quality health services: a global imperative for universal health coverage ISBN 978-92-4-151390-6 WHO ISBN 978-92-64-30030-9 (PDF) OECD © World Health Organization, OECD, and International Bank for Reconstruction and Development/The World Bank, 2018 Authors;
- Leatherman S, Syeds S, Neilson M, Fresca R WHO Handbook for national quality policy and strategy; A practical approach for developing policy and strategy to improve quality of care © World Health Organization 2018 ISBN 978-92-4-156556-1
