= Stephen Morris (judge) =

British judge

The Honourable Mr Justice Morris
- Royal coat of arms of the United Kingdom

High Court Judge King's Bench Division
- Incumbent
- Assumed office 03 October 2016
- Monarch: Elizabeth II

Personal details
- Born: 18 July 1957 (age 69) United Kingdom
- Education: Christ's College, Cambridge

Sir Stephen Nathan Morris (born 18 May 1957) is a British High Court judge.

Morris was educated at Bradford Grammar School and completed a BA at Christ's College, Cambridge in 1979.

In 1981, he was called to the bar at Lincoln's Inn. He served as a recorder from 2000 to 2016 and a deputy High Court judge from 2004 to 2016 on the north-east circuit. He took silk in 2002. He practised from 20 Essex Street chambers and was a leading practitioner in competition law.

On 3 October 2016, he was appointed a judge of the High Court and assigned to the Queen's Bench Division. He took the customary knighthood in the same year. He serves until 31 December 2022 as an election rota judge.
