= Neil Garnham =

British judge

The Honourable Mr Justice Garnham
- Coat of arms of the United Kingdom

High Court Judge King's Bench Division
- Incumbent
- Assumed office 5 November 2015
- Monarch: Charles III

Personal details
- Born: 11 February 1959 (age 67) United Kingdom
- Education: Peterhouse, Cambridge

Sir Neil Stephen Garnham (born 11 February 1959) is a British High Court judge.

Garnham was educated at Ipswich School, then completed a BA at Peterhouse, Cambridge. He was called to the bar at Middle Temple in 1982. He practised from 1 Crown Office Row chambers from 1982, joining from 1 Temple Gardens.

He was junior counsel to the Crown from 1995 to 2001. In 2001, he was counsel for the inquiry into the murder of Victoria Climbié. In 2011 and 2012, he acted for the Metropolitan Police Service at the Leveson Inquiry. In 2013, he represented the Government in a High Court case concerning what classified materials could be disclosed in judicial proceedings around the death of Alexander Litvinenko.

He took silk in 2001 and was appointed a recorder in the same year; he served in this position until 2015. He was appointed a deputy High Court judge in 2008.

On 5 November 2015, he was appointed a judge of the High Court, serving in the Queen's Bench Division, and took the customary knighthood in the same year. He has been Presiding Judge of the Western Circuit since 2019.

He married Gillian Mary Shaw in 1991, with whom he has two sons.
