= Andrew J. Baker =

American astrophysicist

- Education: Harvard University (BA); California Institute of Technology
- Occupation: Astrophysicist

Andrew J. Baker is an American astrophysicist.

After completing a Bachelor of Arts degree in mathematics and physics at Harvard University, he completed a doctorate in astronomy at the California Institute of Technology. In 2006, Baker joined the faculty of Rutgers University. Baker was elected a fellow of the American Association for the Advancement of Science in 2014.
