= List of Royal Marines full generals =

This is a list of full generals in the Royal Marines. The rank of general (or full general to distinguish it from the lower general officer ranks) is the highest rank currently achievable by serving officers in the Royal Marines although no dedicated Royal Marines full general posts currently exist, unless they serve in tri-service positions. The Commandant General Royal Marines, a professional post created in 1943, is often – but not exclusively (not 1977 to 2022, see list) – held by a full general, including incumbents of a lower general officer rank promoted to general during their tenure in that post.

Promoted	Name	Born	Died	Notes
1838	James Meredyth		1841	
1854	Walter Tremenheere	1761	1855	placed on the Retired List 1855
1855	Edward Nicolls	1779	1865	promoted while on the Retired List
1855	George Jones		1857	
1855	George Beatty		1857	
1857	Thomas Parke	1780	1858	
1857	Sir Charles Menzies	1783	1866	
1858	John Rawlins Coryton	1791	1867	
1862	Sir Samuel Ellis	1787	1865	
1866	Henry Ivatt Delacombe	1790	1878	
1866	Fortescue Graham	1794	1880	
1867	John Tatton Brown	1795	1880	
1870	Sir Anthony Stransham	1805	1900	
1870	Alexander Anderson	1807	1877	
1870	Thomas Holloway		1875	
1875	John Gascoigne	1811	1893	
1875	Henry Carr Tate			
1877	Sir George Augustus Schomberg	1821	1907	Deputy Adjutant-General Royal Marines 1872–75
1877	Hayes Marriott			
1877	George Lambrick	1814	1903	
1897	Sir Howard Sutton Jones	1835	1912	placed on the Retired List 1900
	Frederick Gasper Le Grand	1837	1905	placed on the Retired List 1901
1900	Samuel James Graham			
1901	Ardley Henry Falwasser Barnes	1838	1910	placed on the Retired List 1902
1902	Edward Lee Rose	1842	1903	
1912	Sir William Thompson Adair	1850	1931	
1912	Henry Cecil Eagles			(1855–1927)?
1914	James Henry Bor	1857	1914	
1914	William Inglefield Eastman	1856	1941	
1928	Sir Lewis Halliday	1870	1966	Recipient of the Victoria Cross
1945	Sir Thomas Hunton	1885	1970	Commandant General Royal Marines 1943–46
1948	Sir Dallas Brooks	1896	1966	Commandant General Royal Marines 1946–49 (promoted while in the post), 19th Governor of Victoria 1949–63
1951	Sir Leslie Hollis	1897	1963	Commandant General Royal Marines 1949–52
	Sir John Westall	1901	1986	Commandant General Royal Marines 1952–55
	Sir Campbell Hardy	1906	1984	Commandant General Royal Marines 1955–59
1961	Sir Ian Riches	1908	1996	Commandant General Royal Marines 1959–62
1964	Sir Malcolm Cartwright-Taylor	1911	1969	Commandant General Royal Marines 1962–65
1967	Sir Norman Tailyour	1914	1979	Commandant General Royal Marines 1965–68
1970	Sir Peter Hellings	1916	1990	Commandant General Royal Marines 1968–71 (promoted while in the post)
1973	Sir Ian Gourlay	1920	2013	Commandant General Royal Marines 1971–75 (promoted while in the post)
1977	Sir Peter Whiteley	1920	2016	Commandant General Royal Marines 1975–77, Commander-in-Chief Allied Forces Northern Europe 1977–79
2016	Sir Gordon Messenger	1962		Vice-Chief of the Defence Staff 2016–19, Rear-Admiral of the United Kingdom since 2021, Constable of the Tower since 2022
2022	Sir Gwyn Jenkins			Commandant General Royal Marines since 2022, Vice-Chief of the Defence Staff 2022–24, First Sea Lord since 2025

== See also ==
- List of British Army full generals
- List of Royal Navy admirals
- List of Royal Air Force air chief marshals
