= Herbert Blumberg =

General Sir Herbert Blumberg KCB
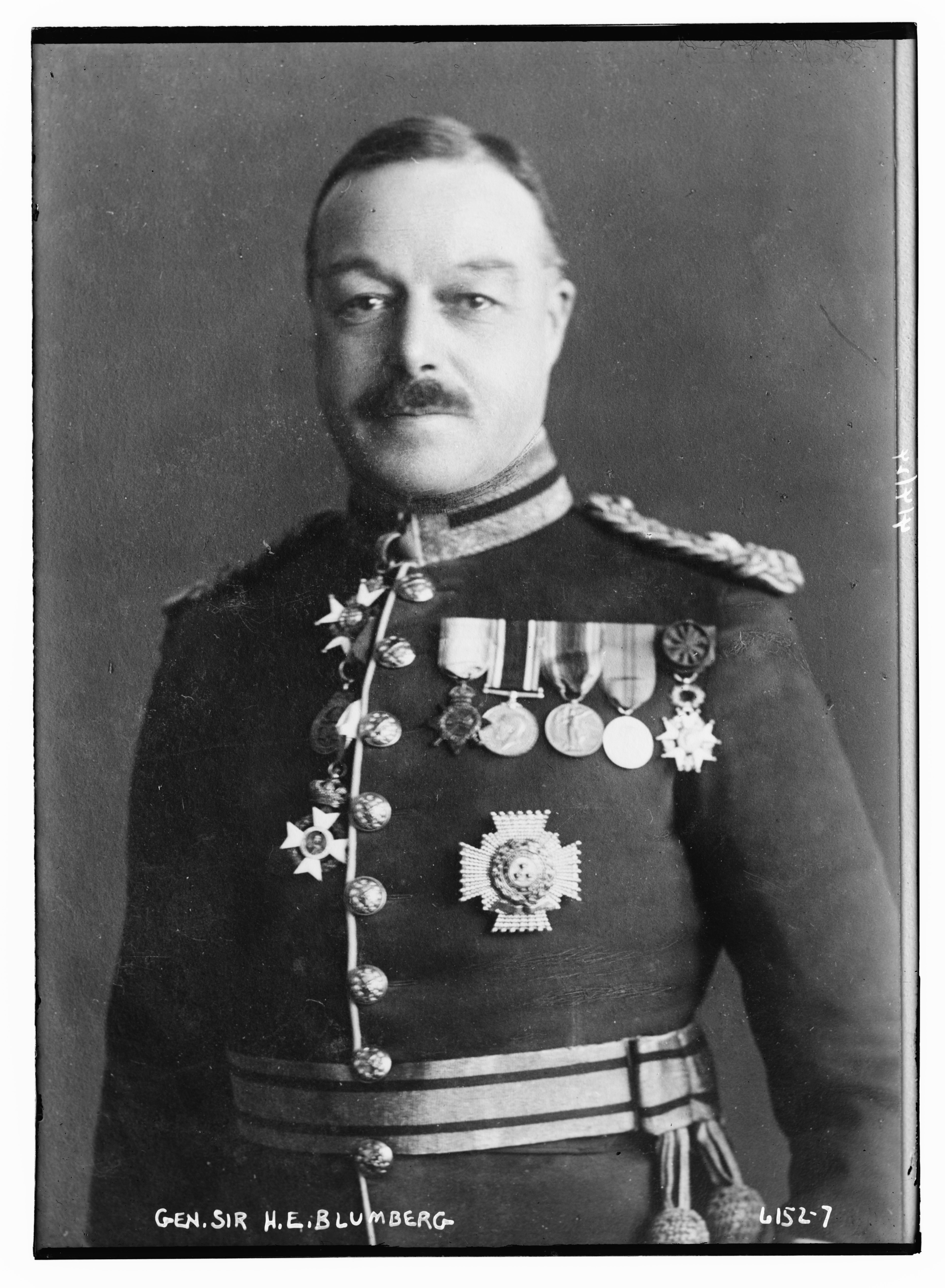
- Born: 20 March 1869
- Died: 16 August 1934 (aged 65)
- Military career
- Allegiance: United Kingdom
- Branch: Royal Marines
- Service years: 1888–1924
- Rank: General
- Commands: Adjutant-General Royal Marines
- Conflicts: First World War
- Awards: Knight Commander of the Order of the Bath (KCB)

General Sir Herbert Edward Blumberg, KCB (20 March 1869 – 16 August 1934) was a Royal Marines officer who served as Adjutant-General Royal Marines.

== Military career ==
Blumberg was commissioned into the Royal Marine Light Infantry on 1 February 1888.

He served as Deputy Assistant Adjutant-General at Headquarters, Royal Marine Forces from October 1911 and as Assistant Adjutant-General at Headquarters, Royal Marine Forces from June 1916 during the First World War. He was promoted to temporary brigadier general on 1 July 1918.

He went on to be Adjutant-General Royal Marines in December 1920 before retiring in March 1924.

== Works ==
- Blumberg, Herbert (1927). Britain's Sea Soldiers: A record of the Royal Marines during the War 1914-1919. Devonport, Devon: Swiss & Co.

Military offices
Preceded by Gunning Campbell	Adjutant-General Royal Marines; 1920–1924	Succeeded by Sir Alexander Hutchison
