= Richard Ford (Royal Marines officer) =

British military officer (1878–1949)

General Sir Richard Ford KCB CBE
- Born: Richard Vernon Tredinnick Ford; 18 February 1878; Portsmouth, Hampshire, England
- Died: 12 April 1949 (aged 71); Folkestone, Kent, England
- Military career
- Allegiance: United Kingdom
- Branch: Royal Marines
- Rank: General
- Commands: Adjutant-General Royal Marines
- Conflicts: First World War
- Awards: Knight Commander of the Order of the Bath; Commander of the Order of the British Empire

General Sir Richard Vernon Tredinnick Ford, KCB, CBE (18 February 1878 – 12 April 1949) was a Royal Marines officer who served as Adjutant-General Royal Marines.

== Military career ==
Born on 18 February 1878, Ford was commissioned into the Royal Marine Artillery in 1896, and promoted to captain on 1 January 1903.

During the First World War he commanded the Royal Navy Siege Guns at Dunkirk, as Second-in-Command of the Royal Marine Heavy Brigade, and then served as Deputy Assistant Adjutant-General at Headquarters, Royal Marine Forces. For these services he was made a Commander of the Order of the British Empire.

In the 1928 Birthday Honours, Ford, by then a colonel, was made a companion of the Order of the Bath (CB), and was an aide-de-camp to the King from 1929 to 1930. Appointed Adjutant-General Royal Marines in June 1930, then the highest appointment within the Royal Marines, he was elevated to Knight Commander of the Order of the Bath (KCB) in the 1933 New Year Honours. Having been promoted to full general on 1 October 1932, he retired in October 1933.

== Personal life ==
Ford was twice married. In 1903, he married Diana Pollard, daughter of Rear-Admiral George Northmore Arthur Pollard. After her death in 1911, he was married in 1913 to Mildred Powell Underwood, daughter of Capt. Powell Cecil Underwood, with whom he had two sons and a daughter.

He died in Folkestone on 12 April 1949, aged 71.

Military offices
Preceded by Sir Lewis Halliday	Adjutant-General Royal Marines; 1930–1933	Succeeded by Sir Richard Foster
