= Richard Foster (Royal Marines officer) =

Royal Marine General

General Sir Richard Foster KCB CMG DSO
- Born: Richard Foster Carter Foster; 27 January 1879
- Died: 3 April 1965 (aged 86)
- Military career
- Allegiance: United Kingdom
- Branch: Royal Marines
- Rank: General
- Commands: Adjutant-General Royal Marines; Colonel, East Surrey Regiment
- Conflicts: First World War
- Awards: Knight Commander of the Order of the Bath; Companion of the Order of St Michael and St George; Distinguished Service Order

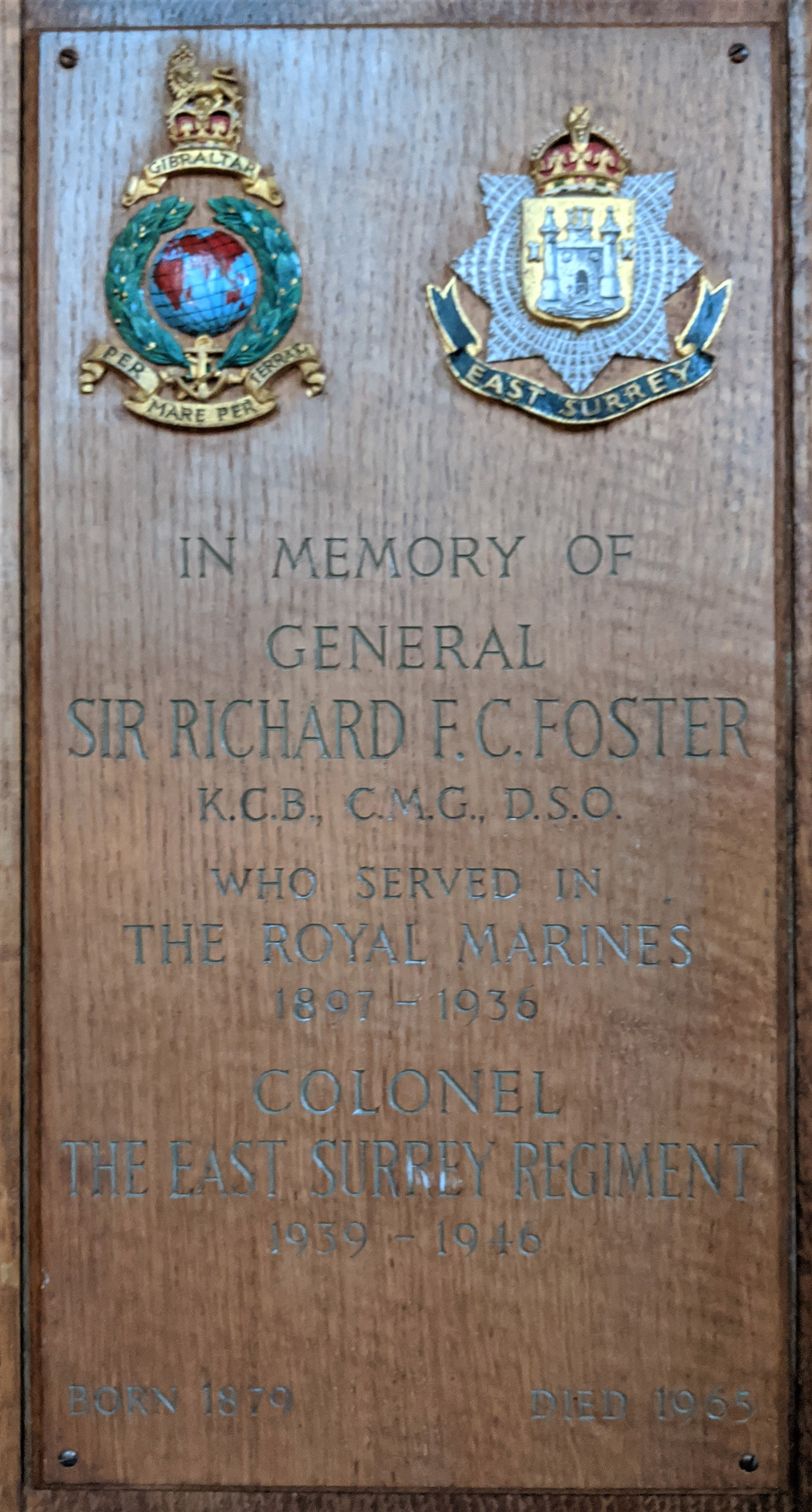
Memorial plaque to Foster in All Saints Church, Kingston upon Thames, Surrey

General Sir Richard Foster Carter Foster, KCB, CMG, DSO (27 January 1879 – 3 April 1965) was a Royal Marines officer who served as Adjutant-General Royal Marines and later as colonel of the East Surrey Regiment.

== Biography ==
Born on 27 January 1879, Foster grew up and was educated at Stubbington House School, a boys' preparatory school near Fareham in Hampshire, where his grandfather and father, and later his brother, served as headmaster. The school specialised in preparing pupils for armed forces officer entrance examinations, particularly for the Royal Navy.

Foster was commissioned into the Royal Marine Artillery in September 1897. In the next few years he held a number posts, including adjutant of the Royal Carmarthen Artillery (Militia) from 1905 to 1908. He attended the army Staff College, Camberley, from 1912 to 1913.

During the First World War Foster held a number of staff appointments, both at home and on the Western Front. He became a temporary lieutenant colonel in September 1915, serving as assistant adjutant and quartermaster general, 63rd (Royal Naval) Division until August 1918 and then assistant quartermaster general, 10th Army Corps until February 1919. For these services he received the Distinguished Service Order in 1918; was made a Companion of the Order of St Michael and St George in June 1919; an officer of the Belgian Order of Leopold with the Croix de Guerre in October 1919 and was four times mentioned in despatches. He then served as assistant quartermaster general of the British Army of the Rhine until April 1923.

Foster was assistant adjutant general of the Royal Marines from 11 December 1925 until 1930 and colonel commandant of the Royal Marines Chatham Division 1930–1932. Promoted major general on 1 October 1932, Foster was appointed Adjutant-General Royal Marines in October 1933, at the time the highest appointment within the Royal Marines, taking over from Richard Ford. While still adjutant-general, he was promoted to lieutenant general in 1934 and then on 1 August 1936 to general. He retired from the Royal Marines in October 1936,

He was made a companion of the Order of the Bath (CB) in January 1930, and elevated to Knight Commander of the Order in 1935.

Foster was colonel of the East Surrey Regiment from March 1939 to 1946. The 31st Foot, which became part of the East Surrey Regiment in 1881, had been first raised as a regiment of marines and Foster did much to develop the ties between the Royal Marines and the East Surreys. He was also honorary colonel commandant of the Chatham Division of the Royal Marines from 1941 to 1949.

Foster died on 3 April 1965 at the age of 86. There is a memorial plaque to him in the East Surrey Regiment chapel, All Saints Church, Kingston upon Thames, Surrey.

One of Foster's brothers, Lieutenant Archibald Courtenay Hayes Foster, was killed in action in British East Africa on 20 September 1914.

Military offices
Preceded by Sir Richard Ford	Adjutant-General Royal Marines; 1933–1936	Succeeded by Sir William Godfrey
Honorary titles
Preceded by John Longley	Colonel of the East Surrey Regiment; 1939–1946	Succeeded by Arthur Dowler
