= William Godfrey (Royal Marines officer) =

Adjutant-General Royal Marines

General Sir William Godfrey KCB CMG
- Born: 2 April 1880; Newry, County Down
- Died: 18 May 1952 (aged 72); Tavistock, Devon
- Military career
- Allegiance: United Kingdom
- Branch: Royal Marines
- Service years: 1898–1939
- Rank: General
- Commands: Adjutant-General Royal Marines; Portsmouth Division Royal Marines
- Conflicts: First World War
- Awards: Knight Commander of the Order of the Bath; Companion of the Order of St Michael and St George

General Sir William Wellington Godfrey, KCB, CMG (2 April 1880 – 18 May 1952) was a Royal Marines officer who served as Adjutant-General Royal Marines.

== Military career ==
Educated at Dulwich College, Godfrey was commissioned into the Royal Marine Artillery on 1 September 1898. Godfrey made a single appearance in first-class cricket for the Royal Navy against the British Army cricket team at Lord's in 1912, scoring 15 runs in the match. He served on the staff of Captain John de Robeck for the evacuation from Gallipoli in January 1916 during the First World War. He went on to be Assistant Adjutant-General Royal Marines in 1930, Commandant of the Portsmouth Division Royal Marines in 1930 and Adjutant-General Royal Marines in October 1936 before retiring in October 1939.

Military offices
Preceded by Sir Richard Foster	Adjutant-General Royal Marines; 1936–1939	Succeeded by Sir Alan Bourne
