= William Wright (Royal Marines officer) =

Royal Marines officer

General Sir William Wright KCB
- Born: 16 July 1846
- Died: 30 April 1910 (aged 63)
- Military career
- Allegiance: United Kingdom
- Branch: Royal Marines
- Service years: 1862–1907
- Rank: General
- Commands: Royal Marines
- Awards: Knight Commander of the Order of the Bath

General Sir William Purvis Wright, KCB (16 July 1846 – 30 April 1910) was a Royal Marines officer who served as Deputy Adjutant-General Royal Marines.

== Military career ==
Wright was commissioned into the Royal Marine Light Infantry on 31 December 1862. He served in the sloop HMS Narcissus in a detached squadron between September 1874 and May 1877 and subsequently wrote a book about his experiences at sea. He became Assistant Adjutant-General Royal Marines on 10 May 1897, and was promoted to the rank of major-general on 14 March 1900. Two years later he was appointed Deputy Adjutant-General Royal Marines (the professional head of the Royal Marines) in June 1902, before retiring in June 1907. As Deputy Adjutant-General he was categorized supernumerary from early October 1902, to allow for other officers to be promoted in the ordinary ranks.

Military offices
Preceded by John Morris	Deputy Adjutant-General Royal Marines; 1902–1907	Succeeded by Sir William Adair
