= Henry Tuson =

British military officer (1836–1916)

General Sir Henry Tuson KCB
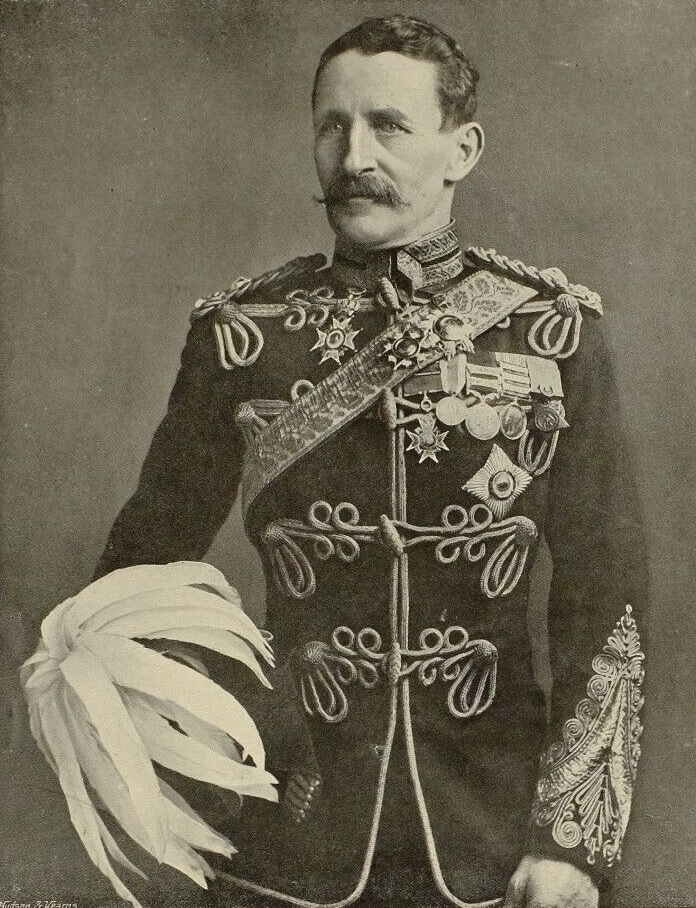
- Born: 30 April 1836
- Died: 21 December 1916 (aged 80)
- Military career
- Allegiance: United Kingdom
- Branch: Royal Marines
- Service years: 1854–1900
- Rank: General
- Commands: Royal Marines
- Conflicts: Second Opium War; Anglo-Egyptian War; Mahdist War
- Awards: Knight Commander of the Order of the Bath

General Sir Henry Brasnell Tuson KCB (30 April 1836 – 21 December 1916) was a Royal Marines officer who served as Deputy Adjutant-General Royal Marines.

== Military career ==
Educated at Christ's Hospital, Tuson was commissioned into the Royal Marine Artillery on 20 April 1854. After serving in China during the Second Opium War, he commanded the Royal Marine Artillery at the Battle of Tel el-Kebir in September 1882 during the Anglo-Egyptian War and then commanded again at the First and Second Battles of El Teb in February 1884 during the Mahdist War for which he was awarded the Order of Osmanieh, second class, on 5 October 1885. He was appointed colonel second commandant of the Royal Marine Artillery on 5 October 1886 and Deputy Adjutant-General Royal Marines (the professional head of the Royal Marines) in August 1893 before retiring in March 1900.

Military offices
| Preceded by Sir Howard Jones | Deputy Adjutant-General Royal Marines; 1893–1900 | Succeeded by John Morris |
