= George Langley (Royal Marines officer) =

General Sir George Langley KCB
- Born: 8 November 1810; Bristol, England
- Died: 28 December 1896 (aged 86); Southsea, Hampshire, England
- Military career
- Allegiance: United Kingdom
- Branch: Royal Marines
- Rank: General
- Commands: Deputy Adjutant-General Royal Marines
- Conflicts: First Carlist War
- Awards: Knight Commander of the Order of the Bath

General Sir George Colt Langley, KCB (8 November 1810 – 28 December 1896) was a Royal Marines officer who served as Deputy Adjutant-General Royal Marines.

== Military career ==
Langley was born in Bristol, the eighth of 12 children born to John Langley and Annabella Claringbold.

Educated at Adams' Grammar School, Langley was commissioned into the Royal Marine Light Infantry. He commanded a detachment of marines off the coast of Spain during the First Carlist War. He became Assistant Adjutant-General at Headquarters Royal Marine Forces in December 1854 and Deputy Adjutant-General Royal Marines (the professional head of the Royal Marines) in January 1862 before retiring in July 1867.

== Personal life ==
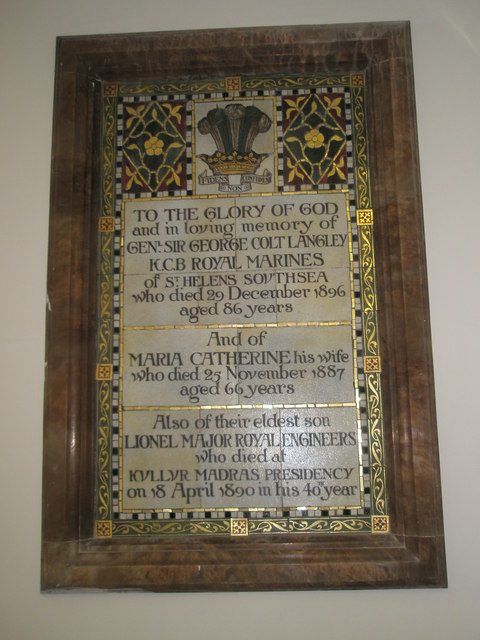
Memorial in St Jude, Southsea, Hampshire

His wife Maria Catherine Langley died in 1887 at the age of 66, their eldest son Lionel died in India in 1890 at the age of 40.

Military offices
Preceded by Sir Samuel Wesley	Deputy Adjutant-General Royal Marines; 1862–1867	Succeeded by Sir Samuel Lowder
