= Alan Bourne =

Senior officer in the Royal Marines (1882–1967)

General Sir Alan Bourne KCB DSO MVO
- Bourne in 1945
- Born: 25 July 1882
- Died: 24 June 1967 (aged 84)
- Military career
- Allegiance: United Kingdom
- Branch: Royal Marines
- Service years: 1899–1943
- Rank: General
- Commands: Adjutant-General Royal Marines; Director of Combined Operations
- Conflicts: First World War; Second World War
- Awards: Knight Commander of the Order of the Bath; Distinguished Service Order; Member of the Royal Victorian Order; Mentioned in Despatches (2); Officer of the Order of Saints Maurice and Lazarus (Italy); Silver Medal of Military Valor (Italy)

General Sir Alan George Barwys Bourne, KCB, DSO, MVO (25 July 1882 – 24 June 1967) was a senior officer in the Royal Marines who had a military career spanning well over 40 years, which included service in the two world wars.

== Early life and family ==
Alan George Barwys Bourne was born on 25 July 1882, the son of Rev. Charles William Bourne (1846–1927), a teacher and clergyman. In 1875, Bourne's father had married Ada, daughter of J. McMinn. A graduate of St John's College, Cambridge, the elder Bourne served as Head Master of Bedford County School (1875–81), Inverness College (1881–89) and King's College School in Wimbledon (1889–1906). He became a Fellow of King's College, London, in 1897, and, after being ordained a priest in 1899, served in a number of ecclesiastical posts. (Note: Charles William Bourne was Curate of All Saints', Wimbledon (1898–1904), Chaplain to the Arnold Morley Convalescent Hospital, Wimbledon (1904–06), Rector of Frating with Thorington, Essex (1906–13), Rector of Staplehurst, Kent (1913–20), and Rural Dean of West Charing (1919–20).)

In 1911, Bourne married Lilian Mary Poole (died 1958), daughter of Colonel Poole Gabbett, an officer in the Royal Army Medical Corps, and his wife Edith Mary (died 1927), daughter of Major General Stewart Richardson, who commanded the 2nd Battalion of the Duke of Cornwall's Light Infantry; they had one daughter: Elizabeth Muriel Barwys (died 2011), who married George Reginald Knox Ord, an officer in The South Wales Borderers and son of G. Knox Ord, in 1940; she married secondly in 1950, Lieutenant Colonel Norman Charles Ries, of the Royal Marines.

== Military career ==
Bourne was commissioned into the Royal Marine Artillery as a second lieutenant on 1 September 1899. Promotions to lieutenant and captain followed on 1 July 1900 and 1 September 1910 respectively; he served on the battleship HMS Majestic from 1903, then HMS Renown between 1905 and 1906, when he was transferred to the Royal Naval College, Osborne. In 1910, he was aboard HMS Balmoral Castle during the Duke of Connaught's visit to South Africa After graduating from the British Army Staff College at Camberley in 1914, Bourne was transferred to HMS Queen and then HMS Tiger in the Grand Fleet; he served on them during the First World War until 1917. Promoted to the rank of major in the Royal Marines on 6 June 1917, he was posted to France and Belgium on 23 July 1917, where he served throughout the remainder of the war. That September, he was appointed a General staff Officer (2nd grade) in France, and held the post until June 1918, when he was promoted to the 1st Division with the rank of temporary lieutenant colonel. During the war, he was mentioned in despatches twice, appointed a companion of the Distinguished Service Order and received two foreign awards: the Order of Saints Maurice and Lazarus (5th class) and the Italian Silver Medal for Military Valour.

Bourne was transferred to the British Army of the Rhine as a General Staff Officer in March 1919, where he served until December of that year. His next posting came on New Years Day 1921, when he was appointed a brigade major with the RMA (till October 1923); he was then an instructor at the Royal Marine Depot, Deal, before graduating from the Imperial Defence College in 1931. A promotion to lieutenant colonel on 16 June 1929 was followed by brevet colonel on New Year's Eve 1932, with seniority from 31 December the previous year. The following September, he was appointed colonel 2nd commandant, having served as Assistant Adjutant General in the Royal Marines since March 1933. He was appointed colonel commandant on 5 October 1935 with the rank of temporary brigadier, before serving as an aide-de-camp to the King between March 1937 and September 1938. On 1 October 1938, he was promoted to the rank of major-general. The following year, he was promoted to lieutenant general and then in 1942 he became a general; as well as serving as Director of Combined Operations in 1940, he was Adjutant-General Royal Marines between 1939 and 1943, when he retired.

At the time of his retirement, Bourne was the last officer in the Royal Marines to hold a commission from Queen Victoria. He was appointed a Member of the Royal Victorian Order in 1909, a Companion of the Order of the Bath in 1937 and a Knight Commander of the Order of the Bath in 1941. He died on 24 June 1967.

== Likenesses ==
- Sir Alan George Barwys Bourne by Walter Stoneman, April 1945. Bromide print, 5 1/4 in. x 3 3/4 in. (132 mm x 95 mm). Commissioned, 1945. National Portrait Gallery, London: Photographs Collection (NPG x165385).

Military offices
Preceded by Sir William Godfrey	Adjutant-General Royal Marines; 1939–1943	Succeeded by Sir Thomas Hunton (as Commandant-General Royal Marines)
