= Alexander Hutchison (Royal Marines officer) =

British Royal Marines officer

General Sir Alexander Hutchison KCB CMG DSO
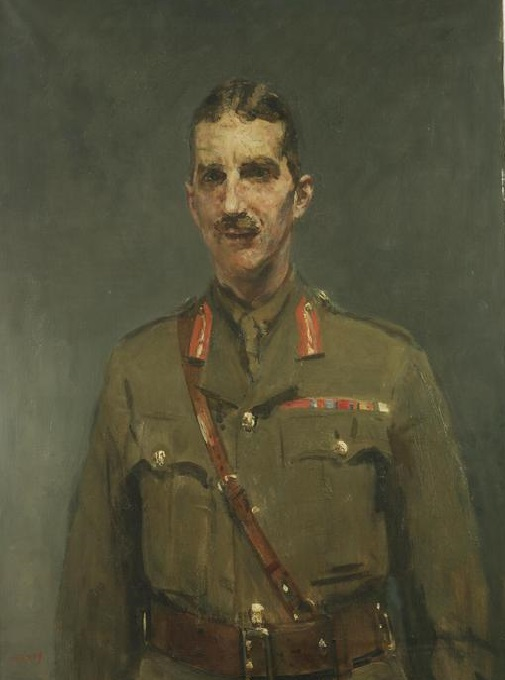
- Born: 2 August 1871; Colombo, Ceylon
- Died: 1930
- Military career
- Allegiance: United Kingdom
- Branch: Royal Marines
- Service years: 1890–1927
- Rank: General
- Commands: Adjutant-General Royal Marines
- Conflicts: Second Boer War; First World War
- Awards: Knight Commander of the Order of the Bath; Companion of the Order of St Michael and St George; Distinguished Service Order

General Sir Alexander Richard Hamilton Hutchison, KCB, CMG, DSO (2 August 1871 – 1930) was a Royal Marines officer who served as Adjutant-General Royal Marines.

== Background and family ==
Hutchison was the second son of Colonel Frederick Joe Hutchison, 84th Regiment with his second wife Elizabeth Schlesinger. He was born in Colombo, Ceylon, where his father was stationed at the time of his birth in 1871. He married at Holy Trinity Church, Gosport, on 7 January 1903, Georgina Courtenay (Daisy) Haswell, from Gosport, eldest daughter of W. H. Haswell, Fleet Paymaster in the Royal Navy.

== Military career ==
Hutchison was commissioned into the Royal Marine Light Infantry on 28 March 1890. Promoted to captain on 6 December 1897, he fought in the Second Boer War.

He served as Deputy Assistant Adjutant-General at Headquarters Royal Marine Forces in 1915 and then saw action in the Gallipoli campaign later that year. He was promoted to the temporary rank of brigadier general in June 1917 and took command of a brigade, before becoming Assistant Adjutant-General Royal Marines in July 1918 during the latter stages of the First World War.

Hutchison went on to be Adjutant-General Royal Marines from March 1924 before retiring in December 1927.

Military offices
Preceded by Sir Herbert Blumberg	Adjutant-General Royal Marines; 1924–1927	Succeeded by Sir Lewis Halliday
