= William Nicholls (Royal Marines officer) =

General Sir William Nicholls KCB
- Born: William Charles Nicholls; 25 February 1854; Greenwich, London
- Died: 1 December 1935 (aged 81); East Dean, Wiltshire, England
- Military career
- Allegiance: United Kingdom
- Branch: Royal Marines
- Service years: 1872–1916
- Rank: General
- Commands: Adjutant-General Royal Marines
- Conflicts: Anglo-Zulu War; First World War
- Awards: Knight Commander of the Order of the Bath

General Sir William Charles Nicholls, KCB (25 February 1854 – 1 December 1935) was a Royal Marines officer who served as Adjutant-General Royal Marines.

== Military career ==
Educated at Cheltenham College, Nicholls was commissioned into the Royal Marine Artillery on 15 July 1872. He saw action in South Africa in 1879 during the Anglo-Zulu War. He became Deputy Adjutant-General at Headquarters, Royal Marine Forces in June 1911. At that time the Deputy Adjutant-General was the professional head of the Royal Marines. His post was redesignated Adjutant-General Royal Marines in early 1914 shortly before the Gallipoli landings, in which the Royal Marine Forces took a prominent role, in June 1915 during the First World War. He retired in June 1916.

Military offices
Preceded by Sir William Adair	Deputy Adjutant-General Royal Marines; 1911–1914	Post renamed
New title	Adjutant-General Royal Marines; 1914–1916	Succeeded by Sir David Mercer
