= Commandant General Royal Marines =

Professional head of the Royal Marines

- Flag of the Commandant General

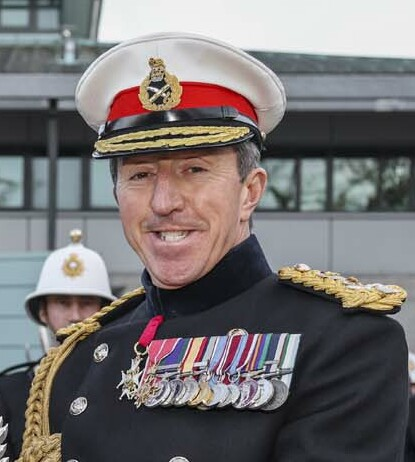
- Incumbent; General Sir Gwyn Jenkins since 25 November 2022
- Ministry of Defence
- Style: General
- Abbreviation: CGRM
- Member of: Admiralty Board; Navy Command
- Reports to: Fleet Commander
- Nominator: Secretary of State for Defence
- Appointer: The Monarch; On the advice of the Prime Minister, subject to formal approval by the King-in-Council
- Term length: 1-4 years
- Formation: 1825
- First holder: Major-General Sir James Campbell
- Deputy: Deputy Commandant General Royal Marines
- Website: About Commandant General Royal Marines

Commandant General Royal Marines is the professional head of the Royal Marines. The title has existed since 1943. The role is held by a General who is assisted by a Deputy Commandant General, with the rank of brigadier. This position is not to be confused with Captain General Royal Marines, the ceremonial head. The Commandant General Royal Marines is the counterpart to the Commandant of the United States Marine Corps.

== History ==
In 1760 three naval captains were appointed colonels of marines. However, these were naval officers and it meant that the furthest a marine officer could advance was to lieutenant colonel. It was not until 1771 that commandants of the three divisions (Portsmouth, Plymouth and Chatham) were appointed. The first single professional head of the Royal Marine Forces was the Deputy Adjutant-General, a post which existed from 1825 until 1914 when the post was re-designated the Adjutant-General: the post holder usually held the rank of full general. Since 1943 the professional head of the Royal Marines has been the Commandant-General who held the rank of full general until 1977, the rank of lieutenant general until 1996, the rank of major general until April 2021, the rank of lieutenant general until November 2022, and the rank of full general since 2022. Lieutenant General Robert Magowan was the first person to assume the role twice, serving between 2016 and 2017 and again from 2021 to 2022.

On 25 November 2022 the Royal Marines announced that General Gwyn Jenkins, then Vice-Chief of the Defence Staff, would be concurrently appointed the new Commandant General Royal Marines, making him the first full general to occupy the role since 1977.

From 1825 until 1964 his headquarters office which changed location several times was known as the Royal Marine Office.

== Role ==
The appointment had been held concurrently with that of Commander United Kingdom Amphibious Forces (COMUKAMPHIBFOR) since the creation of the Fleet Battle Staff in 2001. COMUKAMPHIBFOR was one of two deployable two-star maritime operational commanders (the other being Commander UK Maritime Forces (COMUKMARFOR), now Commander United Kingdom Strike Force, with particular responsibility for amphibious and littoral warfare. Unlike COMUKMARFOR, COMUKAMPHIBFOR is primarily configured to command as a combined joint task force and designed to support a single two star commander. In April 2018, it was announced that the two separate deployable two-star maritime operational commanders (COMUKMARFOR and COMUKAMPHIBFOR) would be merged into a single, larger, maritime battle staff.

In April 2021, the role passed to a more senior officer in a dual-hatted capacity, and the commandant general's role, as well as being the professional head of the Royal Marines, was identified as championing emerging concepts in amphibious warfare and maintaining critical ties with the US Marine Corps.

== General Officers Commanding ==
General Officers Commanding have included:

=== Deputy Adjutant General Royal Marines ===
- Major-General Sir James Campbell 1825–1831
- Major-General Sir John Savage 1831–1836
- Lieutenant-General Sir John Owen 1836–1854
- Lieutenant-General Sir Robert Wesley 1854–1862
- General Sir George Langley 1862–1867
- General Samuel Lowder 1867–1872
- General Sir George Schomberg 1872–1875
- Lieutenant General George Rodney 1875–1878
- Major-General Sir Charles Adair 1878–1883
- General Sir John Williams 1883–1888
- General Sir Howard Jones 1888–1893
- General Sir Henry Tuson 1893–1900
- Lieutenant-General John Morris 1900–1902
- Lieutenant-General Sir William Wright 1902–1907
- General Sir William Adair 1907–1911
- General Sir William Nicholls 1911–1914

=== Adjutant General Royal Marines ===
- General Sir William Nicholls 1914–1916
- Major-General Sir David Mercer 1916–1920
- Major-General Gunning Campbell July 1920 – November 1920
- General Sir Herbert Blumberg 1920–1924
- General Sir Alexander Hutchison 1924–1927
- General Sir Lewis Halliday 1927–1930
- General Sir Richard Ford 1930–1933
- General Sir Richard Foster 1933–1936
- General Sir William Godfrey 1936–1939
- General Sir Alan Bourne 1939–1943

=== Commandant General Royal Marines ===
No.	Portrait	Name (Birth–Death)	Term of office			Ref.
No.	Portrait	Name (Birth–Death)	Took office	Left office	Time in office	Ref.
1		General; Sir Thomas Hunton (1885–1970)	January 1943	1946	2–3 years	–
2		General; Sir Dallas Brooks (1896–1966)	1946	May 1949	2–3 years	–
3		General; Sir Leslie Hollis (1897–1963)	1949	1952	2–3 years	–
4		General; Sir John Westall (1901–1986)	1952	1955	2–3 years	–
5		General; Sir Campbell Hardy (1906–1984)	1955	1959	3–4 years	–
6		General; Sir Ian Riches (1908–1996)	1959	1962	2–3 years	–
7		General; Sir Malcolm Cartwright-Taylor (1911–1969)	1962	1965	2–3 years	–
8		General; Sir Norman Tailyour (1914–1979)	1965	1968	2–3 years	–
9		General; Sir Peter Hellings (1916–1990)	1968	1971	2–3 years	–
10		General; Sir Ian Gourlay (1920–2013)	1971	9 June 1975	6–7 years	–
11		General; Sir Peter Whiteley (1920–2016)	1975	1977	1–2 years	–
12		Lieutenant General; Sir John Richards (1927–2004)	1977	1981	3–4 years	–
13		Lieutenant General; Sir Steuart Pringle (1928–2013)	1981	1984	2–3 years	–
14		Lieutenant General; Sir Michael Wilkins (1933–1994)	1984	1987	2–3 years	–
15		Lieutenant General; Sir Martin Garrod (1935–2009)	1987	1990	2–3 years	–
16		Lieutenant General; Sir Henry Beverley (born 1935)	1990	1994	3–4 years	–
17		Lieutenant General; Sir Robin Ross (1939–2025)	1994	1996	1–2 years	–
18		Major General; David Pennefather (born 1945)	1996	1998	1–2 years	–
19		Major General; Robert Fulton (born 1948)	1998	2001	2–3 years	–
20		Major General; Robert Fry (born 1951)	2001	2002	0–1 years	–
21		Major General; Anthony Milton (born 1949)	May 2002	February 2004	1 year, 9 months	–
22		Major General; David Wilson (born 1949)	February 2004	August 2004	6 months	–
23		Major General; James Dutton (born 1954)	August 2004	June 2006	1 year, 10 months	–
24		Major General; Garry Robison (born 1958)	June 2006	June 2009	3 years	–
25		Major General; Andrew Salmon (born 1959)	26 June 2009	February 2010	7 months	–
26		Major General; Francis Howes (born 1960)	February 2010	December 2011	1 year, 10 months	–
27		Major General; Edward Davis (born 1963)	December 2011	13 June 2014	2 years, 6 months	
28		Major General; Martin Smith (born 1962)	13 June 2014	4 June 2016	1 year, 11 months	
29		Major General; Robert Magowan (born 1967)	4 June 2016	19 January 2018	1 year, 7 months	
30		Major General; Charles Stickland (born 1968)	19 January 2018	14 June 2019	1 year, 4 months	
31		Major General; Matthew Holmes (1967–2021)	14 June 2019	30 April 2021	1 year, 10 months	
32		Lieutenant General; Robert Magowan (born 1967)	30 April 2021	25 November 2022	1 year, 6 months	
33		General; Sir Gwyn Jenkins	25 November 2022	Incumbent	3 years, 9 months	

== List of Deputy Commandants General ==
The following have served as Deputy Commandant General:

- 2011–2013: Brigadier Bill Dunham
- 2014–2017: Brigadier Richard Spencer
- 2017–2020: Brigadier Haydn White
- 2020–2022: Brigadier Anthony R. Turner
- 2022-2025: Brigadier Neil Sutherland MBE
- 2025-Present: Major General Paul Maynard OBE
