= History of the Marines =

The history of the Marines may refer to:

- the history of the Royal Marines, since 1664
- the history of the United States Marine Corps, since 1775
