= List of British full generals =

For lists of British full generals, see:

- List of British Army full generals
- List of Royal Marines full generals
