= Lewis Halliday =

Recipient of the Victoria Cross

General Sir Lewis Halliday VC KCB DL
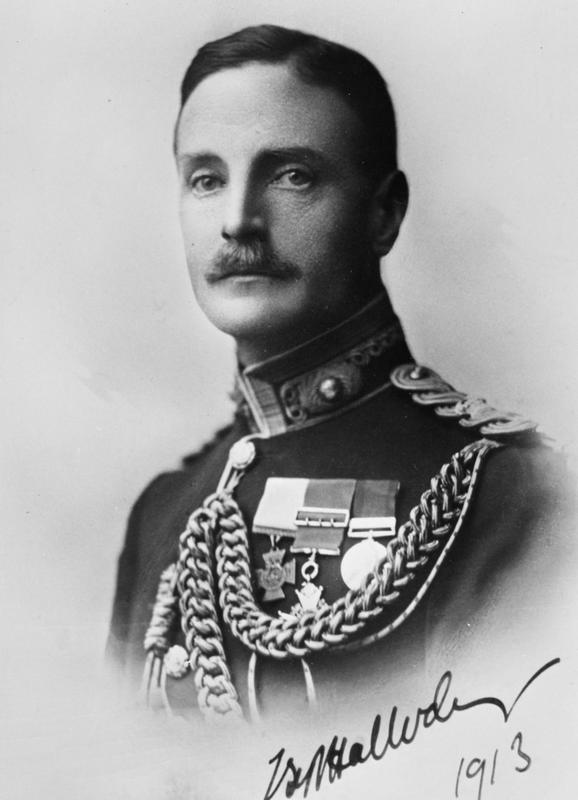
- Sir Lewis Halliday, dated 1913.
- Born: 14 May 1870; Medstead, Hampshire, England
- Died: 9 March 1966 (aged 95); Dorking, Surrey, England
- Military career
- Allegiance: United Kingdom
- Branch: Royal Marines
- Service years: 1889–1930
- Rank: General
- Units: HMS Galatea; HMS Empress of India
- Commands: Adjutant-General Royal Marines
- Conflicts: Boxer Rebellion; First World War
- Awards: Victoria Cross; Knight Commander of the Order of the Bath

General Sir Lewis Stratford Tollemache Halliday, VC, KCB, DL (14 May 1870 – 9 March 1966) was an English Royal Marine officer and a recipient of the Victoria Cross, the highest award for gallantry in the face of the enemy that can be awarded to British and Commonwealth forces.

== Early life ==
Halliday was born in Medstead, Hampshire on 14 May 1870. He was commissioned into the Royal Marines in 1889.

== Victoria Cross ==
Halliday was 30 years old, and a captain in the Royal Marine Light Infantry, during the Boxer Rebellion in China when the following deed took place for which he was awarded the VC.

On 24 June 1900 at Peking, China, an attack was made on the British Legation by the Boxers who set fire to the stables and occupied some of the other buildings. It being imperative to drive the enemy out, a hole was knocked in the Legation wall and 20 men of the RMLI went in. Captain Halliday, leading a party of six men, was involved in desperate fighting and was severely wounded but despite his injuries, he killed four of the enemy. Finally, unable to carry on any further, he ordered his men to go on without him, after which he returned to the legation alone, telling his men 'carry on and not mind him', so as not to diminish the number of men engaged in the sortie. He walked 100 yards unaided to the hospital although his shoulder was half blown out and his left lung punctured.

His citation reads:

Captain (now Brevet Major) Lewis Stratford Tollemache Halliday, Royal Marine Light Infantry

On the 24th June, 1900, the enemy, consisting of Boxers and Imperial troops, made a fierce attack on the west wall of the British Legation, setting fire to the West Gate of the south stable quarters, and taking cover in the buildings which adjoined the wall. The fire, which spread to part of the stables, and through which and the smoke a galling fire was kept up by the Imperial troops, was with difficulty extinguished, and as the presence of the enemy in the adjoining buildings was a grave danger to the Legation, a sortie was organised to drive them out. A hole was made in the Legation Wall, and Captain Halliday, in command of twenty Marines, led the way into the buildings and almost immediately engaged a party of the enemy. Before he could use his revolver, however, he was shot through the left shoulder, at point blank range, the bullet fracturing the shoulder and carrying away part of the lung. Notwithstanding the extremely severe nature of his wound, Captain Halliday killed three of his assailants, and telling his men to "carry on and not mind him," walked back unaided to the hospital, refusing escort and aid so as not to diminish the number of men engaged in the sortie.

— London Gazette, 1 January 1901.

He was promoted to brevet major for his part in the legation's defence, and returned to the United Kingdom to receive the VC from King Edward VII during an investiture at Marlborough House on 25 July 1901.

== Later service ==
Having recovered from his wound he returned to duty at the end of 1901. He commanded the Marine detachment aboard HMS Galatea, and then commanded the Marines aboard HMS Empress of India, the flagship of the home fleet, from late 1902. In 1907 having completed the Staff College, Camberley, he was appointed staff officer to the Portsmouth Division of his corps. He then commanded a company of Gentleman Officer Cadets at the Royal Military College, Sandhurst for four years during which time he was promoted to major. Among his cadets was the future Field Marshal Earl Alexander of Tunis.

In November 1914 he was promoted to temporary lieutenant colonel and succeeded Brevet Lieutenant Colonel Hamilton Reed as a GSO1. In early 1915 he was promoted to brevet lieutenant colonel and on 14 July of that year he was made lieutenant colonel. In November 1915 he joined GHQ, Home Forces as General Staff Officer.

He was promoted colonel second commandant on 1 October 1920 and colonel commandant on 1 January 1923. Halliday was promoted to major general on 11 December 1925, to lieutenant general on 11 June 1927 and to general on 1 October 1928. He served as ADC to King George V in 1924 and 1925, and he held the post of Adjutant-General Royal Marines from December 1927 until his voluntary retirement in June 1930. He was invested as a Companion of the Order of the Bath on 3 June 1913, he was elevated as a Knight Commander of the Order of the Bath on 1 January 1930.

== The medal ==
His Victoria Cross was displayed at the Royal Marines Museum in Southsea, England.

Military offices
Preceded by Sir Alexander Hutchison	Adjutant-General Royal Marines; 1927–1930	Succeeded by Sir Richard Ford
Court offices
Preceded by Sir Reginald Brade	Gentleman Usher to the Sword of State; 1933–1946	Succeeded by Sir Arthur Barratt
