= John Ignatius Morris =

Lieutenant-General John Ignatius Morris
- Born: 29 March 1842
- Died: 1 October 1902 (aged 60); Kensington, London
- Military career
- Allegiance: United Kingdom
- Branch: Royal Marines
- Service years: 1859–1902
- Rank: Lieutenant-General
- Commands: Deputy Adjutant-General Royal Marines
- Conflicts: Nile Expedition; Suakin Expedition

Lieutenant-General John Ignatius Morris (29 March 1842 – 1 October 1902) was a Royal Marines officer who served as Deputy Adjutant-General Royal Marines.

== Military career ==
Morris was the son of Reverend George Sculthorpe Morris, of Bretforton, Worcestershire. He was commissioned into the Royal Marine Light Infantry on 12 May 1859. He sailed in the first-rate HMS Queen off the coast of Naples in the aftermath of the Second Italian War of Independence in 1860 and then sailed off the coast of Syria during the Mount Lebanon Civil War later that year. In the early 1860s he landed several times with armed parties to protect British interests in the Eastern Mediterranean, including Lebanon and Greece.

Morris served in the Nile Expedition in 1884, and was with the Royal Marine battalion at the Suakin Expedition in 1885. From March 1885 until the end of the expedition he was Deputy Assistant Adjutant-General of the Suakin Field force and Assistant Provost Marshal and Press Censor. When the expedition was abolished he was for a time Commandant of Suakin Town.

After his return to the United Kingdom, Morris was called to the Bar at the Inner Temple in 1888.

Morris became colonel commandant of the Royal Marine Depot, Deal in 1897 and Deputy Adjutant-General Royal Marines (the professional head of the Royal Marines) in March 1900, before retiring in June 1902 due to ill health. He committed suicide in Kensington on 1 October 1902.

Military offices
Preceded by Sir Henry Tuson	Deputy Adjutant-General Royal Marines; 1900–1902	Succeeded by Sir William Wright
