= David Mercer (Royal Marines officer) =

Major-General Sir David Mercer KCB
- Sir David Mercer, 1918
- Born: 1 July 1864; Islington, Middlesex
- Died: 1 July 1920 (aged 56); London, England
- Military career
- Allegiance: United Kingdom
- Branch: Royal Marines
- Service years: 1883–1920
- Rank: Major-General
- Commands: Adjutant-General Royal Marines (1916–20); 1st Royal Naval Brigade (1914–16)
- Conflicts: First World War
- Awards: Knight Commander of the Order of the Bath; Mentioned in Despatches (2)

Major-General Sir David Mercer, KCB (1 July 1864 – 1 July 1920) was a Royal Marines officer who served as Adjutant-General Royal Marines.

== Military career ==
Mercer was commissioned into the Royal Marine Light Infantry as a lieutenant on 1 February 1883, promoted to captain on 20 January 1894, and to major on 27 May 1901. He was appointed deputy assistant adjutant-general to the Royal Marine Forces on 13 March 1903.

He became commander of the 1st (Royal Naval) Brigade in 1914 and saw action during the Siege of Antwerp. Following the subsequent retreat, Mercer led the brigade into the Netherlands to avoid capture by the Germans. In 1915, still at the head of the brigade, he took part in the Gallipoli landings in June 1915. The plan had been for Mercer to become military governor of Imbros but, after fierce fighting, he was evacuated from Gallipoli in December 1915.

He went on to be Assistant Adjutant-General in September 1911 and Adjutant-General Royal Marines in June 1916.

== Personal life ==
Mercer married Katherine F. Laurence, who survived him. He died on his 56th birthday of heart failure following an operation. He was buried in Hamilton Road Cemetery, Deal.

== Sources ==
- Sellers, Leonard (1993). The Hood Battalion. Pen & Sword. ISBN 978-1473819412.

Military offices
Preceded by Sir William Nicholls	Adjutant-General Royal Marines; 1916–1920	Succeeded by Gunning Campbell
