= Gunning Campbell =

Royal Marines general

Major-General Gunning Campbell CB
- Born: 6 January 1863; East Indies
- Died: 29 November 1920 (aged 57)
- Military career
- Allegiance: United Kingdom
- Branch: Royal Marines
- Service years: 1880–1920
- Rank: Major-General
- Commands: Adjutant-General Royal Marines
- Conflicts: Mahdist War; First World War
- Awards: Companion of the Order of the Bath

Major-General Gunning Morehead Campbell, CB (6 January 1863 – 29 November 1920) was a Royal Marines officer who served as Adjutant-General Royal Marines.

== Military career ==
Educated at Wellington College and the Royal Naval College, Greenwich, Campbell was commissioned into the Royal Marine Artillery on 1 September 1880. He took part in the Nile Expedition in 1884 and served as Inspector of Recruiting during the First World War. He went on to be Adjutant-General Royal Marines in July 1920 but died in office in November 1920. He was buried in Portsmouth (Highland Road) Cemetery.

Military offices
Preceded by Sir David Mercer	Adjutant-General Royal Marines; July–November 1920	Succeeded by Herbert Blumberg
