= George Lambrick =

General George Lambrick
- Born: June , 1814
- Died: 30 January 1903 (aged 88); Cheddar, Somerset
- Military career
- Allegiance: United Kingdom
- Branch: Royal Marines
- Service years: 1834–1879
- Rank: General
- Conflicts: First Carlist War

General George Lambrick (June 1814 – 30 January 1903) was a Royal Marines officer in the middle 19th century.

== Military career ==
Lambrick was commissioned into the Royal Marine Light Infantry on 14 March 1834, and was part of the Royal Marine Battalion serving under General George de Lacy Evans on the North coast of Spain from 1836 to 1840, during the First Carlist War. In this war he was present for nine general engagements, including the capture of Hernani and the attack on Fontarabia, where he was wounded. For his services in Spain he was mentioned in despatches, received the 1st class of the Spanish Order of San Fernando, and was promoted to lieutenant on 2 March 1840.

As lieutenant, he was from 1844 to 1849 second in command of the military settlement of Victoria at Port Essington in Australia′s Northern Territory, during which he was promoted to captain on 1 October 1848. From April 1855 to June 1857 he was posted to Ascension Island. He was promoted to major on 19 June 1860 and subsequently to lieutenant-colonel on 13 September 1860. In 1861–62 he was employed on special service in Mexico as second in command of the Royal Marine Battalion, and on 28 November 1864 he was promoted to colonel and appointed aide-de-camp to Queen Victoria. He was promoted to major-general on 6 March 1868, lieutenant-general on 1 October 1877, and full general on 25 December 1877, before he retired on 4 June 1879.

He died at Sunnymead, Cheddar, Somerset on 30 January 1903.

Lambrick married first Emma Jane Dillon (1822–1846), who died with their two infant daughters in Australia, leaving one daughter Emma Lambrick to reach adulthood. After a second marriage to Susan Pascoe Dillon (who died in 1852), he last married in 1860 Matilda Ann Elizabeth Menzies, daughter of fellow Royal Marine officer Sir Charles Menzies. They had two sons, and she died in 1898.
