= William Adair =

Royal Marines general

General Sir William Adair KCB
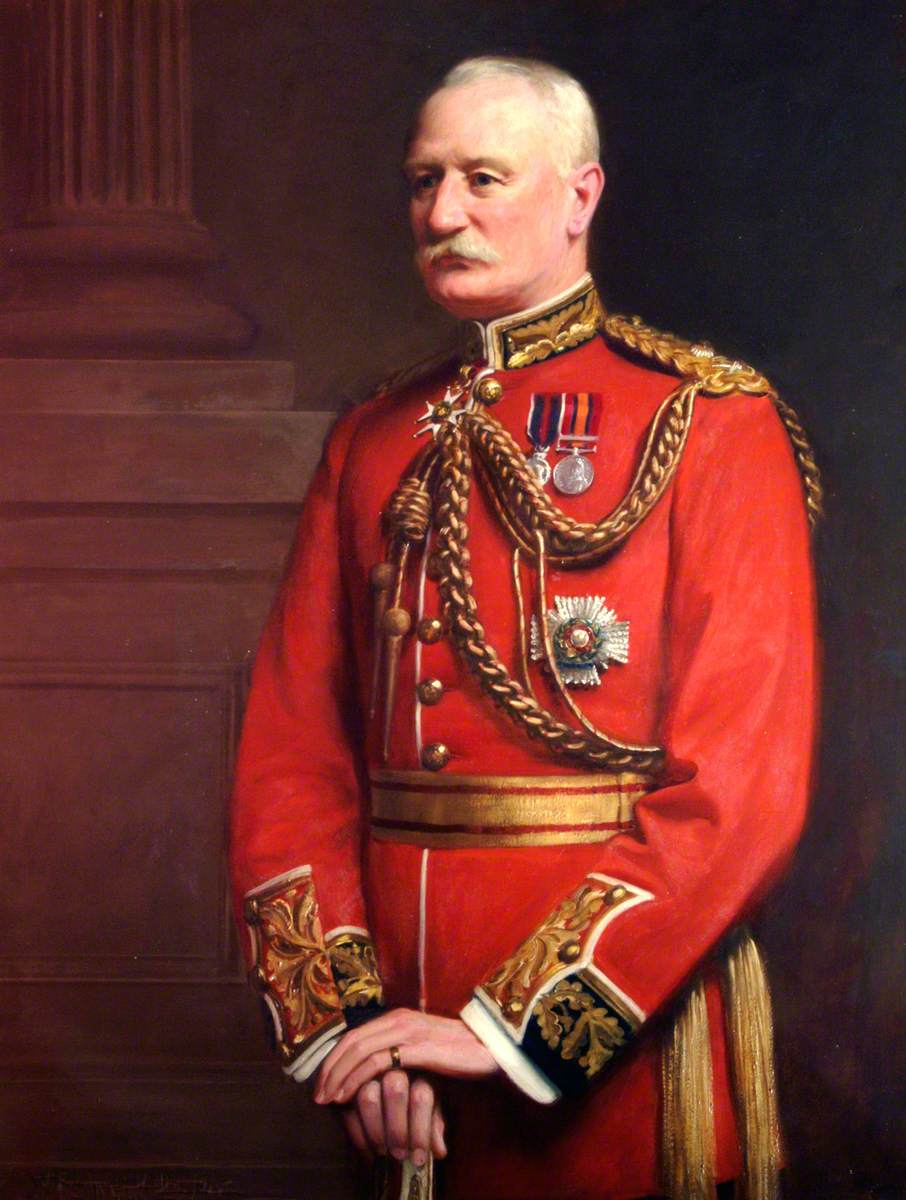
- Adair c.1910
- Born: 21 June 1850; Gosport, Hampshire
- Died: 29 December 1931 (aged 81); Kensington, London
- Relatives: General Sir Charles Adair (father); Admiral Charles Henry Adair (brother)
- Military career
- Allegiance: United Kingdom
- Branch: Royal Marines
- Service years: 1867–c. 1911
- Rank: General
- Conflicts: Second Boer War
- Awards: Knight Commander of the Order of the Bath

General Sir William Thompson Adair KCB (21 June 1850 – 29 December 1931) was a Royal Marines officer and Ulster Unionist.

== Biography ==
Adair was born into a distinguished military family, the son of Sir Charles Adair and Isabella Aslett, daughter of Col. Thompson Aslett of the Royal Marines. His three brothers were Sir Charles Henry Adair, Rear-Admiral T. B. S. Adair, and Brig.-Gen. Hugh Robert Adair.

Educated at Cheltenham College, he entered the Royal Marine Light Infantry as a lieutenant on 6 December 1867, and was promoted to captain on 1 July 1881. He received the brevet rank of major on 6 December 1888, the substantive rank of major on 3 May 1889, the brevet rank of lieutenant colonel on 6 December 1895, and the substantive rank of lieutenant colonel on 7 February 1896. In early February 1900 he embarked the SS Canada leaving Southampton for South Africa, where he was to serve in the Second Boer War. He received the brevet rank of colonel on 7 February 1900, and was appointed Assistant Adjutant General on 1 November 1900. Following his return to the United Kingdom, he was promoted colonel second commandant of the Royal Marine Light Infantry on 30 January 1902. He became Deputy Adjutant-General Royal Marines (the professional head of the Royal Marines) June 1907 before retiring in June 1911.

Adair played a prominent role in the Ulster Unionist Party and was commander of the Antrim Ulster Volunteer Force. In 1914, he took charge of the landing and dispersal of guns during the Larne gun-running.

== Personal life ==
In 1880, he married Rose Naylor. She died in 1903. In 1905, at age 60, he married English-Argentine Angela Eliza Plowes, age 55. Her father, Frederick Plowes, was a first cousin of Ann Walker, wife of diarist Anne Lister. He died in 1931 in Kensington, and his widow died two years later.

== Sources ==
- D.J. Hickey & J.E. Doherty. A Dictionary of Irish History. Gill & MacMillan. Ireland 1980. p3 ISBN 0-7171-1567-4

Military offices
Preceded by Sir William Wright	Deputy Adjutant-General Royal Marines; 1907–1911	Succeeded by Sir William Nicholls
