= Howard Jones (Royal Marines officer) =

General Sir Howard Jones KCB
- Born: 10 February 1835
- Died: 8 December 1912 (aged 77)
- Military career
- Allegiance: United Kingdom
- Branch: Royal Marines
- Service years: 1853–1893
- Rank: General
- Commands: Deputy Adjutant-General Royal Marines
- Conflicts: Crimean War; Anglo-Egyptian War
- Awards: Knight Commander of the Order of the Bath

General Sir Howard Sutton Jones KCB (10 February 1835 – 8 December 1912) was a Royal Marines officer who served as Deputy Adjutant-General Royal Marines.

== Military career ==
Jones was commissioned into the Royal Marine Light Infantry on 3 August 1853. After serving in the Crimean War, he served on the Pacific Station dealing with boundary issues, before moving to the Fraser River in British Columbia where he faced with rioting miners. He then commanded a battalion in Ireland dealing with protestors from the Irish National Land League before serving as a staff officer at the actions at Kassassin and Tel-el-Mahuta and at the Battle of Tel el-Kebir in September 1882 during the Anglo-Egyptian War. He became colonel second commandant of the Royal Marine Light Infantry on 14 April 1883, colonel commandant of the Royal Marine Light Infantry on 7 November 1885, and Deputy Adjutant-General Royal Marines (the professional head of the Royal Marines) in August 1888 before retiring in August 1893.

Military offices
Preceded by Sir John Williams	Deputy Adjutant-General Royal Marines; 1888–1893	Succeeded by Sir Henry Tuson
