= John Williams (Royal Marines officer) =

General Sir John Williams KCB
- Born: 29 August 1823; Walmer, Kent, England
- Died: 21 July 1911 (aged 87); Havant, Hampshire, England
- Military career
- Allegiance: United Kingdom
- Branch: Royal Marines
- Service years: 1842–1888
- Rank: General
- Commands: Royal Marines
- Awards: Knight Commander of the Order of the Bath

General Sir John William Collman Williams KCB (29 August 1823 – 21 July 1911) was a Royal Marines officer who served as deputy adjutant-general Royal Marines.

== Military career ==
The son of Dr. John Williams of the Royal Navy, Williams was commissioned into the Royal Marines on 7 July 1842. He became assistant adjutant of Royal Marine Forces in November 1867, second commandant of the Royal Marine Artillery in April 1870 and commandant of the Royal Marine Artillery in October 1872. He went on to be deputy adjutant-general Royal Marines (the professional head of the Royal Marines) in September 1883 before retiring in August 1888.

He died in Hampshire on 21 July 1911.

Military offices
Preceded by Sir Charles Adair	Deputy Adjutant-General Royal Marines; 1883–1888	Succeeded by Sir Howard Jones
