= Robert Wesley =

British Army general (1791–1877)

Lieutenant-General Sir Robert Wesley KCB
- Born: c. 1791; Lismote Castle, County Limerick, Kingdom of Ireland
- Died: 5 January 1877; Woolwich, London
- Military career
- Allegiance: United Kingdom
- Branch: Royal Marines
- Rank: Lieutenant-General
- Commands: Royal Marines
- Conflicts: First Carlist War; Crimean War
- Awards: Knight Commander of the Order of the Bath

Lieutenant-General Sir Samuel Robert Wesley KCB (c. 1791 – 5 January 1877) was an Anglo-Irish Royal Marines officer who served as Deputy Adjutant-General Royal Marines.

== Early life ==
Wesley was the son Robert Wesley and Ellen Butt of Lismoat or Lismote Castle, County Limerick, Kingdom of Ireland, where he was born around 1791.

== Military career ==
Wesley was commissioned into the Royal Marine Artillery. He saw action in Spain during the First Carlist War before becoming Assistant Adjutant-General at Headquarters Royal Marine Forces. He became Deputy Adjutant-General Royal Marines (the professional head of the Royal Marines) in December 1854 and directed the involvement of the Royal Marines during the Crimean War before retiring in January 1862.

Military offices
Preceded by Sir John Owen	Deputy Adjutant-General Royal Marines; 1854–1862	Succeeded by Sir George Langley
