= Tony Milton =

British Royal Marines general (born 1949)

Major General Tony Milton CB OBE
- Born: 19 August 1949 (age 77)
- Military career
- Allegiance: United Kingdom
- Branch: Royal Marines
- Service years: 1967–2004
- Rank: Major General
- Commands: Commandant General Royal Marines; 3 Commando Brigade; 40 Commando
- Conflicts: Operation Banner; Iraq War
- Awards: Companion of the Order of the Bath; Officer of the Order of the British Empire

Major General Anthony Arthur Milton, CB, OBE (born 19 August 1949) is a retired senior Royal Marines officer who served as Commandant General Royal Marines and Commander United Kingdom Amphibious Forces from 2002 to 2004.

== Military career ==
Milton joined the Royal Marines in 1967 and subsequently became an equerry to the Duke of Edinburgh, then Captain General Royal Marines. He became commanding officer of 40 Commando in 1992, in which role he was deployed to Northern Ireland. He was appointed Officer of the Order of the British Empire (OBE) "in recognition of gallant and distinguished service in Northern Ireland during the period 1st April to 30th September 1994".

Following promotion to brigadier in 1996, Milton was appointed commander of 3 Commando Brigade in 1995 and, in 1999, director general for joint doctrine and concepts, a post established following the Strategic Defence Review. He went on to be Commandant-General Royal Marines in May 2002 and took over as British maritime commander for Operation Telic – the invasion of Iraq – in April 2003, before retiring in February 2004.

He was appointed a Companion of the Order of the Bath (CB) in the 2002 Birthday Honours.

Military offices
Preceded by Robert Fry	Commandant General Royal Marines; 2002–2004	Succeeded by David Wilson
