= Bill Dunham =

Brigadier Bill Dunham CBE
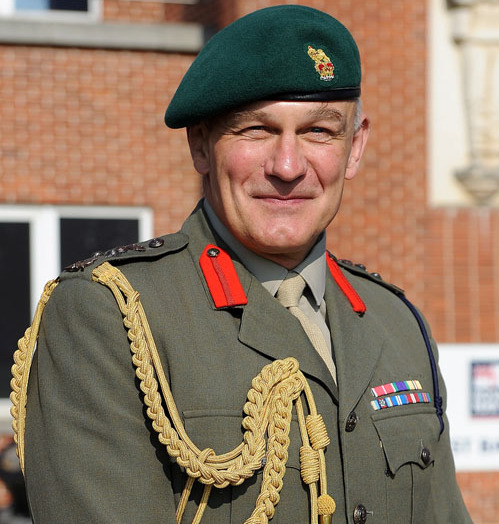
- Dunham in 2012
- Born: 22 January 1961 (age 65); Boston, Lincolnshire, England
- Military career
- Allegiance: United Kingdom
- Branch: Royal Marines
- Service years: 1979–2013
- Rank: Brigadier
- Commands: Commando Training Centre Royal Marines
- Conflicts: Iraq War; War in Afghanistan
- Awards: Commander of the Order of the British Empire

Brigadier Mark William Dunham, CBE (born 1961) is a retired Royal Marines officer who served as the Deputy Commandant General Royal Marines.
