= David Wilson (Royal Marines officer) =

Retired senior Royal Marines officer

Major General David Wilson CB CBE
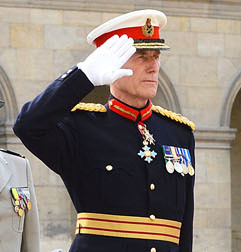
- Major General Wilson in 2015
- Born: 1949 (age 76–77)
- Military career
- Allegiance: United Kingdom
- Branch: Royal Marines
- Service years: 1969–2004
- Rank: Major general
- Commands: Commandant General Royal Marines; 3 Commando Brigade; 45 Commando; Special Boat Service
- Conflicts: Operation Banner; Kosovo War; Iraq War
- Awards: Companion of the Order of the Bath; Commander of the Order of the British Empire; Mentioned in dispatches

Major General David Wilson, CB, CBE (born 1949) is a retired senior Royal Marines officer who briefly served as Commandant General Royal Marines from February to August 2004.

== Military career ==
Wilson joined the Royal Marines in 1969 and went on to serve in Northern Ireland in 1987. He was mentioned in despatches later that year "in recognition of distinguished service" during the deployment. He commanded the Special Boat Service, as well as being Commanding Officer of 45 Commando from 1993 and commander of 3 Commando Brigade from 1998. From December 1999 he was Chief of Staff at NATO Joint Headquarters North. He was later deployed to Kosovo, where he became co-chairman of the Kosovo Security Committee. He was the Senior British Representative to United States Central Command in Tampa, Florida, from October 2002 to October 2003 (in which role he was involved in planning for the Iraq War) and became Commandant General Royal Marines in February 2004, before retiring later that year.

== Later life ==
In retirement, Wilson became Director of a United Nations programme engaged in disarming warlords and disbanding illegal armed groups in Afghanistan.

Military offices
Preceded by Anthony Milton	Commandant General Royal Marines; February – August 2004	Succeeded by James Dutton
