= Malcolm Cartwright-Taylor =

General Sir Malcolm Cartwright-Taylor KCB
- Cartwright-Taylor in 1960
- Born: 29 October 1911; Mansfield, Nottinghamshire
- Died: 5 November 1969; Kingston upon Hull, Yorkshire
- Military career
- Allegiance: United Kingdom
- Branch: Royal Marines
- Service years: 1930–1965
- Rank: General
- Commands: Commandant General Royal Marines
- Conflicts: Second World War; Indonesia–Malaysia confrontation
- Awards: Knight Commander of the Order of the Bath

General Sir Malcolm Cartwright Cartwright-Taylor, KCB (29 October 1911 – 5 November 1969) was a British Royal Marines officer who served as Commandant General Royal Marines from 1962 to 1965.

== Military career ==
Educated at Rugby School, Cartwright-Taylor was commissioned into the Royal Marines in 1930 and served in the Second World War in the battleship HMS Renown, at the Royal Marines Depot at Exton and at Headquarters, 117th Infantry Brigade. He was appointed Fleet Royal Marines Officer for the South Atlantic Fleet in 1950, Major General Royal Marines at Plymouth in 1959 and Commandant General Royal Marines in 1962. In that role he deployed 2,000 Royal Marines to Malaysia during the Indonesia–Malaysia confrontation before retiring in 1965.

In retirement he became a member of the Membership Arbitration Panel of the Association of British Travel Agents.

Military offices
Preceded by Sir Ian Riches	Commandant General Royal Marines; 1962–1965	Succeeded by Sir Norman Tailyour
