= John Owen (Royal Marines officer) =

Royal Marines officer

Lieutenant-General Sir John Owen KCB KH
- Born: c. 1777
- Died: 1857
- Military career
- Allegiance: United Kingdom
- Branch: Royal Marines
- Rank: Lieutenant-General
- Commands: Deputy Adjutant-General Royal Marines
- Conflicts: First Carlist War
- Awards: Knight Commander of the Order of the Bath; Knight of the Royal Guelphic Order

Lieutenant-General Sir John Owen, KCB, KH (c. 1777–1857) was a Royal Marines officer who served as Deputy Adjutant-General Royal Marines.

== Military career ==
Owen was commissioned into the Royal Marines. He commanded a marine battalion which repulsed an enemy force four times its size near San Sebastián in Spain in March 1836 during the First Carlist War. He became Deputy Adjutant-General Royal Marines (the professional head of the Royal Marines) in November 1836, before retiring in December 1854.

Military offices
Preceded by Sir John Savage	Deputy Adjutant-General Royal Marines; 1836–1854	Succeeded by Sir Robert Wesley
