= James Campbell (Royal Marines officer) =

Major-General Sir James Campbell KCH
- Born: 1761
- Died: 23 January 1840 (aged 78–79); Rothesay, Bute
- Military career
- Allegiance: United Kingdom
- Branch: Royal Marines
- Rank: Major-General
- Commands: Royal Marines
- Awards: Knight Commander of the Royal Guelphic Order

Major-General Sir James Campbell KCH (1761 – 23 January 1840) was a Royal Marines officer who served as Deputy Adjutant-General Royal Marines.

== Military career ==
Campbell was commissioned into the Royal Marines in 1776. He became a major and field officer at the Chatham Division in April 1802 and went on to be lieutenant colonel at the Portsmouth Division in November 1808. Promoted to major-general on 27 May 1825, he became Deputy Adjutant-General Royal Marines (the professional head of the Royal Marines) in August 1825 before retiring in March 1831.

== Sources ==
- Moore, John (1989). The First Fleet Marines. University of Queensland Press. ISBN 0702220655.

Military offices
Preceded by New Post	Deputy Adjutant-General Royal Marines; 1825–1831	Succeeded by Sir John Savage
