= Ian Riches =

General Sir Ian Riches KCB DSO
- Born: 27 September 1908
- Died: 23 December 1996 (aged 88)
- Military career
- Allegiance: United Kingdom
- Branch: Royal Marines
- Service years: 1927–1962
- Rank: General
- Commands: Commandant General Royal Marines; Infantry Training Centre Royal Marines; 3 Commando Brigade; 42 Commando
- Conflicts: Second World War
- Awards: Knight Commander of the Order of the Bath; Companion of the Distinguished Service Order

General Sir Ian Hurry Riches, KCB, DSO (27 September 1908 – 23 December 1996) was a Royal Marines officer who served as Commandant General Royal Marines from 1959 to 1962.

== Military career ==
Educated at University College School, Riches joined the Royal Marines in 1927. He served in the Second World War and was appointed a Companion of the Distinguished Service Order for his service during the Italian Campaign. He became commanding officer of 42 Commando in 1948, commander of 3 Commando Brigade in 1954, and commander of the Infantry Training Centre Royal Marines in 1955. He went on to be General Officer Commanding the Portsmouth Group of the Royal Marines in 1957 and Commandant General Royal Marines in 1959 before retiring in 1962. He was appointed a Knight Commander of the Order of the Bath in the 1960 Birthday Honours.

In retirement Riches became a Regional Director of Civil Defence.

Military offices
Preceded by Sir Campbell Hardy	Commandant General Royal Marines; 1959–1962	Succeeded by Sir Malcolm Cartwright-Taylor
