= John Boscawen Savage =

British marine officer (1760–1843)

Major-General Sir John Boscawen Savage KCB KCH
- Born: 23 February 1760; Hereford, Herefordshire
- Died: 8 March 1843 (aged 83); Woolwich, London
- Military career
- Allegiance: United Kingdom
- Branch: Royal Marines
- Rank: Major-General
- Commands: Royal Marines
- Conflicts: Anglo-Spanish War; French Revolutionary Wars
- Awards: Knight Commander of the Order of the Bath; Knight Commander of the Royal Guelphic Order

Major-General Sir John Boscawen Savage KCB, KCH (23 February 1760 – 8 March 1843) was a Royal Marines officer who served as Deputy Adjutant-General Royal Marines.

== Military career ==
Savage was commissioned into the Royal Marines in January 1777. He first saw action at the Great Siege of Gibraltar in 1779 but fought again at the action of 8 January 1780 off Cape Finisterre and at the Battle of Cape St. Vincent later in the month during the Anglo-Spanish War. He saw combat again at the Battle of Cape St Vincent in February 1797, at the Battle of the Nile in August 1798 and at the Battle of Copenhagen in April 1801 during the French Revolutionary Wars.

He became colonel commandant of the Chatham division in June 1825 and Deputy Adjutant-General Royal Marines (the professional head of the Royal Marines) in March 1831 remaining in that post until shortly before he was promoted to major-general in January 1837.

He was appointed a Knight Commander of the Order of the Bath on 25 October 1839.

Military offices
Preceded by Sir James Campbell	Deputy Adjutant-General Royal Marines; 1831–1836	Succeeded by Sir John Owen
