= Thomas Hunton =

General Sir Thomas Hunton KCB OBE MVO
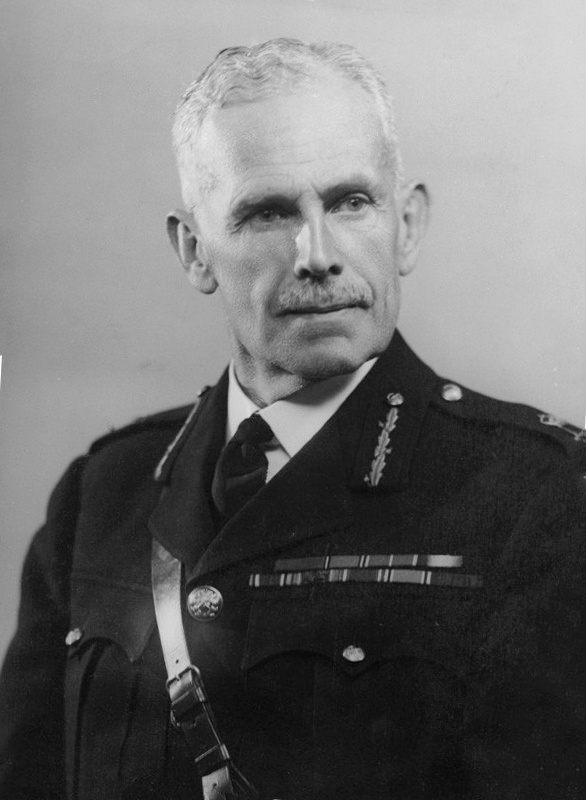
- General Sir Thomas Hunton in 1943
- Born: 30 October 1885; Bristol, England
- Died: 21 April 1970 (aged 84); Lympstone, Devon, England
- Military career
- Allegiance: United Kingdom
- Branch: Royal Marines
- Service years: 1903–1946
- Rank: General
- Commands: Commandant General Royal Marines (1943–46; Portsmouth Division, Royal Marines (1938–41)
- Conflicts: First World War; Second World War
- Awards: Knight Commander of the Order of the Bath; Officer of the Order of the British Empire; Member of the Royal Victorian Order; Mentioned in Despatches (2); Legion of Honour (France); Knight of the Order of the Star of Romania

General Sir Thomas Lionel Hunton, KCB, OBE, MVO (30 October 1885 – 21 April 1970) was a Royal Marines officer who served as the inaugural Commandant General Royal Marines from 1943 to 1946.

== Early life ==
Hunton was born on 30 October 1885 in Bristol, Gloucestershire, the son on Theodore and Emma Maria Hunton.

== Military career ==
Hunton joined Royal Marines in 1903 and served in the First World War before becoming Deputy Assistant Adjutant General of the Royal Marines in 1930 and Assistant Adjutant General of the Royal Marines in 1935. He served in the Second World War as Commander of the Portsmouth Division of the Royal Marines from 1938 and then as Adjutant General Royal Marines (and Commander of the Royal Marine Division) from 1941: it was under his guidance that the Royal Marines Division was broken up between July and September 1943 to provide six new Commandos. He was the first Commandant General Royal Marines from January 1943 until he retired in 1946.

== Family life ==
Hunton married Margaret Mary France Steele on 8 September 1919 in Clifton, Bristol; they had a son and a daughter. He died on 21 April 1970 at Lympstone in Devon.

Military offices
Preceded by Sir Alan Bourne (as Adjutant-General Royal Marines)	Commandant General Royal Marines; 1943–1946	Succeeded by Sir Dallas Brooks
