= Robin Ross =

Robin Ross may refer to:

- Robin Ross (Royal Marines officer) (1939–2025)
- Robin Ross (American football) (born 1954), American football coach
