= History of the Royal Marines =

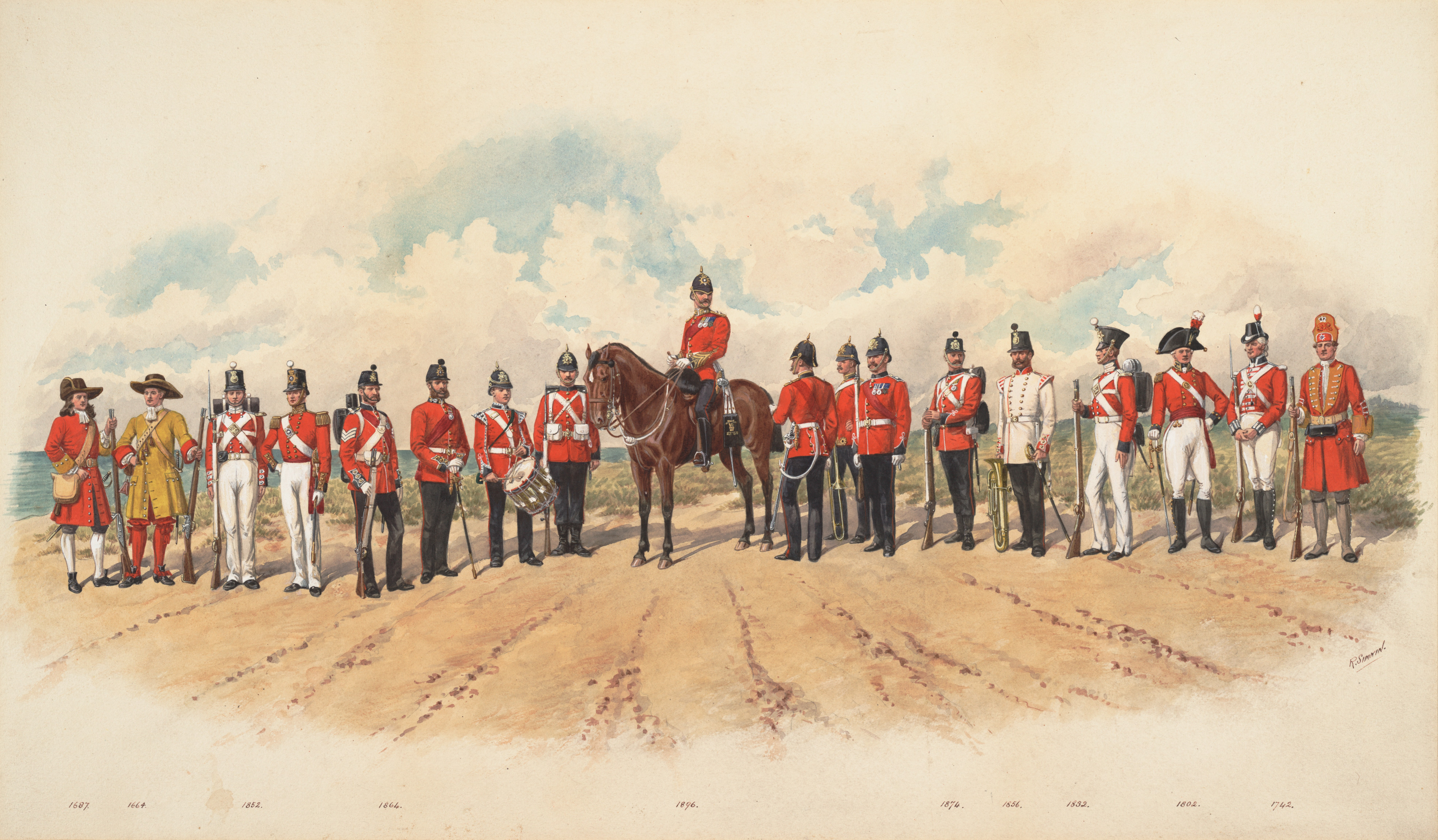
Royal Marine uniforms from 1664 to 1896

The history of the Royal Marines began on 28 October 1664 when the Duke of York and Albany's Maritime Regiment of Foot, a marine regiment of the English Army, was raised in preparation for the Second Anglo-Dutch War. English and later British marine regiments served in the Third Anglo-Dutch War, Nine Years' War, War of the Spanish Succession and War of the Austrian Succession. On 5 April 1755, an Order of Council established His Majesty's Marine Forces, comprising 50 companies of 5,000 men spread across three divisions and under the British Admiralty's control.

On 29 April 1802 His Majesty's Marine Forces were renamed the Royal Marines and in 1804 the Royal Marine Artillery (RMA) was raised to man the artillery onboard bomb vessels of the Royal Navy. As RMA coats were blue like those worn by the British Army's Royal Artillery, the Royal Marine Artillery became known as "Blue Marines" while regular Royal Marines became known as "Red Marines" due to their scarlet coats. During the Napoleonic Wars the Royal Marines participated in virtually all naval battles fought by the British navy along with several amphibious landings. British marines had a dual function aboard Royal Navy ships; routinely, they ensured the security of the ship's officers and supported their maintenance of discipline among the ship's crew, and in battle they engaged enemy crews by firing from positions on their own ship or engaging in boarding actions.

During the First World War, in addition to their usual stations aboard ship, Royal Marines were part of the Royal Naval Division which landed in Belgium in 1914 to help defend Antwerp and later took part in the Gallipoli campaign in 1915. The Royal Marines also took part in the Zeebrugge Raid in 1918. During the Second World War the Royal Marine Division's infantry battalions were re-organised as Commando units, joining the British Army's Commandos. The Division command structure became a Special Service Brigade command. The support troops became landing craft crew and saw extensive action on D-Day on 6 June 1944.

The Falklands War provided the backdrop to the next action of the Royal Marines when Argentina invaded the islands in April 1982. A British task force was immediately dispatched to recapture them, and given that an amphibious assault would be necessary, the Royal Marines were heavily involved. The troops were landed at San Carlos Water at the western end of East Falkland, and proceeded to "yomp" across the entire island to the capital, Stanley, which fell on 14 June 1982. The Royal Marines have subsequently served in the Yugoslav Wars, Sierra Leone Civil War, War in Afghanistan and Iraq War.

== Origin ==
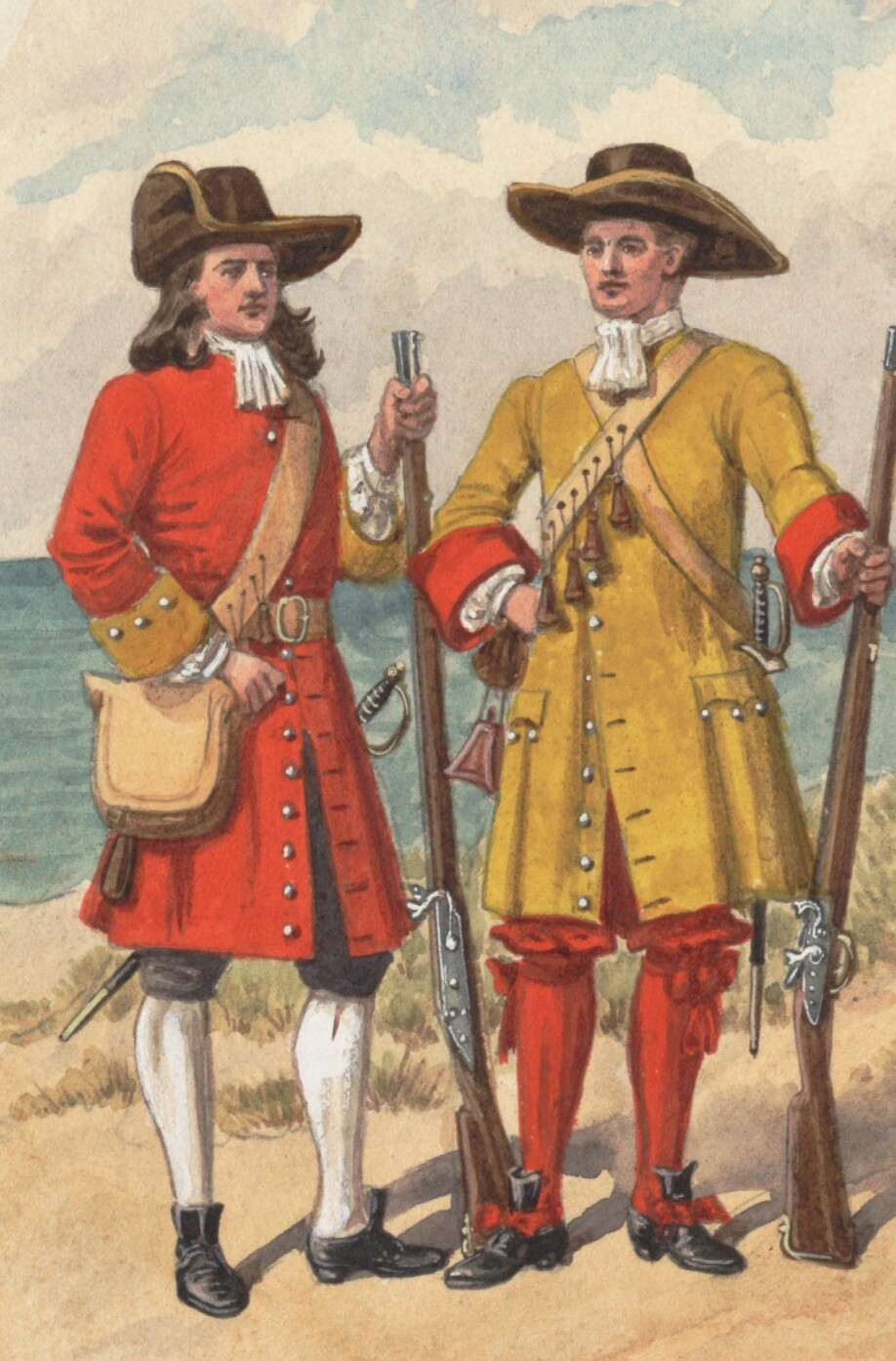
Two 17th-century English marines

The first official marine unit raised in England was formed on 28 October 1664 was the Duke of York and Albany's Maritime Regiment of Foot, a regiment of foot of the English Army. Named after Prince James, the-then Duke of York and Duke of Albany and future king of England, the regiment was soon nicknamed the Lord Admiral's Regiment or simply as the Admiral's Regiment due to James' status as the Lord High Admiral of England. Recruited from the London Trained Bands and comprising 1,200 officers and other ranks divided into six 200-men companies, the regiment was raised in preparation for the upcoming Second Anglo-Dutch War.

This made the English army the fifth oldest European armed force to raise a dedicated marine unit after the Spanish Marine Infantry (1537), the Venetian navy's Fanti da Mar (1550), the Portuguese Marine Corps (1610) and France's troupes de marine (1622). The Duke of York and Albany's Maritime Regiment of Foot's first commanding officers were Colonel Sir William Killigrew and Lieutenant-colonel Sir Charles Lyttleton. Killigrew had previously commanded an English regiment in Dutch service, and many of the newly raised regiment's initial complement of officers had served under Killigrew in that unit as well.

In 1665, Sir George Downing raised the Holland Regiment from troops of the Dutch States Army's Scots Brigade who had refused to swear loyalty to the Dutch Republic. The regiment was renamed the 4th (The Holland Maritime) Regiment in the same year and designated as a marine regiment. An Order of Council issued by the Privy Council of England on 11 July 1665 ordered both marine regiments to be paid for by the Navy Board's Treasurer of the Navy. A company of foot guards served as marines to augment the Admiral's Regiment during the Battle of Solebay in 1672; the Admiral's Regiment was disbanded in 1689 after James was deposed in the Glorious Revolution of 1688. Two new marine regiments, the Earl of Pembroke's Regiment and Earl of Torrington's Regiment, were raised in 1690. Both regiments participated in an amphibious landing at Cork on 21 September 1690 during the Williamite War in Ireland under John Churchill.

In 1698, the English Army's marines were reformed: the two existing regiments were merged into a single one under the command of Thomas Brudenell, while the regular regiments of William Seymour, Edward Dutton Colt and Harry Mordaunt were converted into marines. These regiments were disbanded in 1699. In 1702, six marine regiments and six sea service regiments of foot were raised following the outbreak of the War of the Spanish Succession. When on land, the marines were commanded by Seymour. Their most significant achievement was participating in the capture of Gibraltar in 1704 and resisting the subsequent twelfth siege of Gibraltar alongside Dutch marines from 1704 to 1705. Following the 1713 Peace of Utrecht, three of these regiments were redesignated as line infantry, becoming the 30th, 31st and 32nd Regiments of Foot.

== Eighteenth century ==
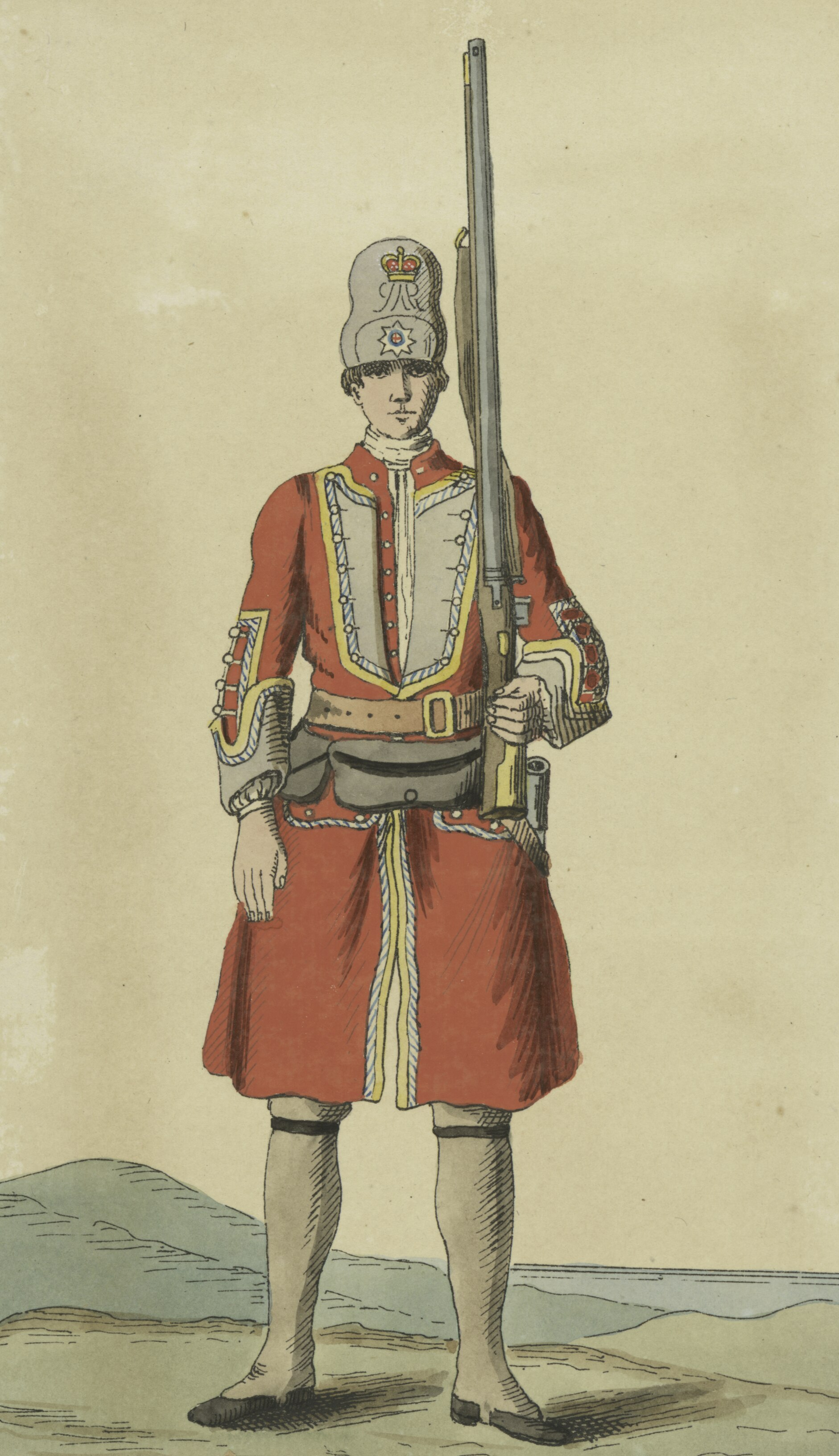
A private of the 4th Regiment of Marines in c. 1742

The British Army raised six marine regiments in November 1739 to serve in the War of Jenkins' Ear, with four more being raised later. One marine regiment, known as Gooch's American Regiment, was raised in the Thirteen Colonies and along several other marine regiments at the Battle of Cartagena de Indias and other engagements of the war. Among its officers was Lawrence Washington, the half-brother of George Washington. In 1747 the British Army's remaining marine regiments were transferred to the Admiralty and disbanded in 1748. Many of the disbanded troops moved to Nova Scotia and helped found Halifax in 1749.

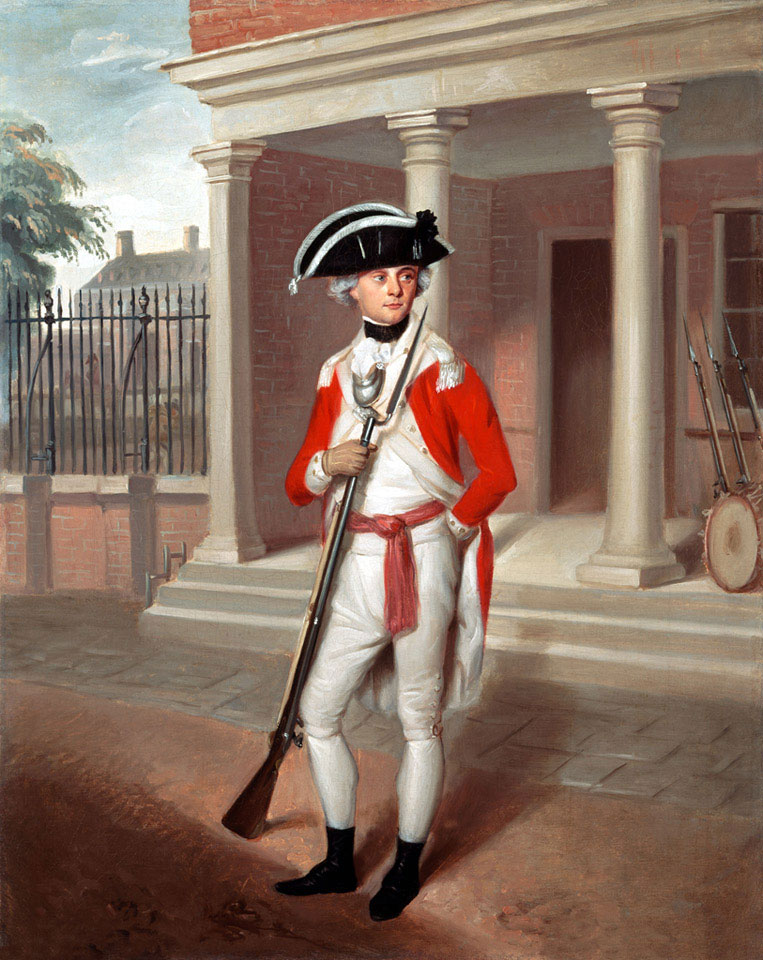
c. 1780 portrait of a marine lieutenant

On 5 April 1755 an Order in Council established His Majesty's Marine Forces, comprising 50 companies of 5,000 men spread across in three divisions, the Portsmouth, Chatham and Plymouth divisions (so named as for the location of the divisional headquarters). The new force was placed under the British Admiralty's control. Initially, all seniormost commanders of His Majesty's Marine Forces (corresponding to the ranks of colonel and general in the British Army) were naval officers as the Royal Navy viewed such ranks as being largely honorary in nature. As such, the most senior rank a British marine officer could hold was lieutenant colonel and it was not until 1771 that the first marine was promoted to colonel; this situation persisted well into the 19th century. During the rest of the 18th century, British marines served in numerous amphibious landings across over the world, the most famous being the capture of Belle Île on the coast of Brittany in 1761. They also served in the American War of Independence. A force of marines under Major John Pitcairn captured the American redoubt at the Battle of Bunker Hill, though Pitcairn and numerous marines were killed or injured. Marines also often took to the ship's boats to repel attackers in small boats when British warships were becalmed on close blockade. James Cook took with him four marines when he was killed in Hawaii on 14 February 1779.

=== New South Wales ===
From May 1787, a detachment of four companies of marines, under Major Robert Ross, accompanied the First Fleet to protect a new colony at Botany Bay (New South Wales). Due to an administrative error the Fleet left Portsmouth without its main supply of ammunition, cartridge paper and tools to repair their flintlocks. The omission was noted early during the voyage and, in July 1787, a request was sent back to the British Home Office from Santa Cruz that the missing supplies be sent out in William Bligh's ship HMS Bounty. Ten thousand rounds of ammunition were also obtained when the Fleet called into Rio de Janeiro en route to Botany Bay. However, despite the Home Office receiving the request, the full resupply was never sent and consequently, after 12 months, the marines ended up in difficult circumstances.

The First Fleet detachment had a strength of 212 including 160 privates. This relatively small force was arranged on the advice of Joseph Banks who advised the British government that local Aborigines were few and retiring. On arrival in New South Wales in January 1788 the Governor of the new colony, naval Captain Arthur Phillip, found that the natives were vastly more numerous than expected and also that they soon started resisting the settlers. Within 12 months, natives killed 5 or 6 First Fleeters and wounded others. Finally, in October 1788, the marines were tasked to expand the initial settlement at Sydney Cove to commence farming more fertile land at Parramatta.

One author has claimed that the Marines deliberately spread smallpox among Australia's indigenous population in order to reduce its military effectiveness, but this is not corroborated by contemporaneous records of the settlement and most researchers attribute the indigenous smallpox outbreak to other causes.

== Nineteenth century ==
On 29 April 1802, His Majesty's Marine Forces were retitled the Royal Marines by George III, largely at the instigation of Admiral of the White John Jervis, 1st Earl of St Vincent. St Vincent requested George III to bestow the "Royal" prefix to the force to reward it for its service during the French Revolutionary Wars.

The Royal Marine Artillery (RMA) was formed as an establishment within the Royal Marines in 1804 to man the artillery in bomb vessels. This had been done by the Royal Regiment of Artillery, but a lawsuit by a Royal Artillery officer resulted in a court decision that army officers were not subject to naval orders. As their coats were the blue of the Royal Regiment of Artillery, this group was nicknamed the "Blue Marines" and the infantry element, who wore the scarlet coats of the British infantry, became known as the "Red Marines", often given the derogatory nickname "Lobsters" by sailors.

=== French Revolutionary and Napoleonic Wars ===
Royal Marines on HMS Victory at the Battle of Trafalgar

During the French Revolutionary and Napoleonic Wars the Royal Marines participated in every notable naval battle on board the Royal Navy's ships and also took part in multiple amphibious actions. Marines had a dual function aboard ships of the Royal Navy in this period; routinely, they ensured the security of the ship's officers and supported their maintenance of discipline in the ship's crew, and in battle, they engaged the enemy's crews, whether firing from positions on their own ship, or fighting in boarding actions.

The number of marines on board Royal Naval ships depended on the size of the ship and was generally kept at a ratio of one marine Private per ship gun, plus officers. For example: by 1810 a 100 gun First Rate Ship of the Line contained 156 marine Privates out of a total of 170 embarked marines, while a 38 gun Frigate had 41 Privates out of a total of 49 embarked marines. At the start of the conflict, there were insufficient numbers of marines, so army personnel were used for 4 years to address this shortfall. (Note: In 1793, there were 9,815 men, which had increased to 30,000 by 1802.) Field estimates the strength of the Royal Marines at about 30,000 in 1805, of whom a tenth would have been present at the Battle of Trafalgar. Between 1804 and 1814, the total marine establishment number was 31,000 men. (Note: Out of the whole number of 35,000 marines, 25,000 were generally on board ships, where, from the very nature of the service, they must necessarily be under the command of the captain of the ship. It would be recollected, however, that no officer higher than a captain of marines could be called upon to serve on board a ship.) One result of the Royal Navy's dominance of the seas in Europe, and the blockading of the French Navy's ports, was that manpower constraints became less of an issue at the end of the Napoleonic Wars. From 1812, such maritime supremacy meant the Mediterranean and Channel Fleets were assigned additional marines by Lord Melville, for use 'in destroying signal communications and other petty harassing modes of warfare'. Of note are the attacks on Cassis on 18 August 1813 and Port Nouvelle on 9 November 1813 led by Lieutenant Hunt. The attack on the signal station at Viareggio near Lucca on 11 December 1813 led to the capture and destruction of the old fort at Motrone, capable of containing nearly 1000 men.

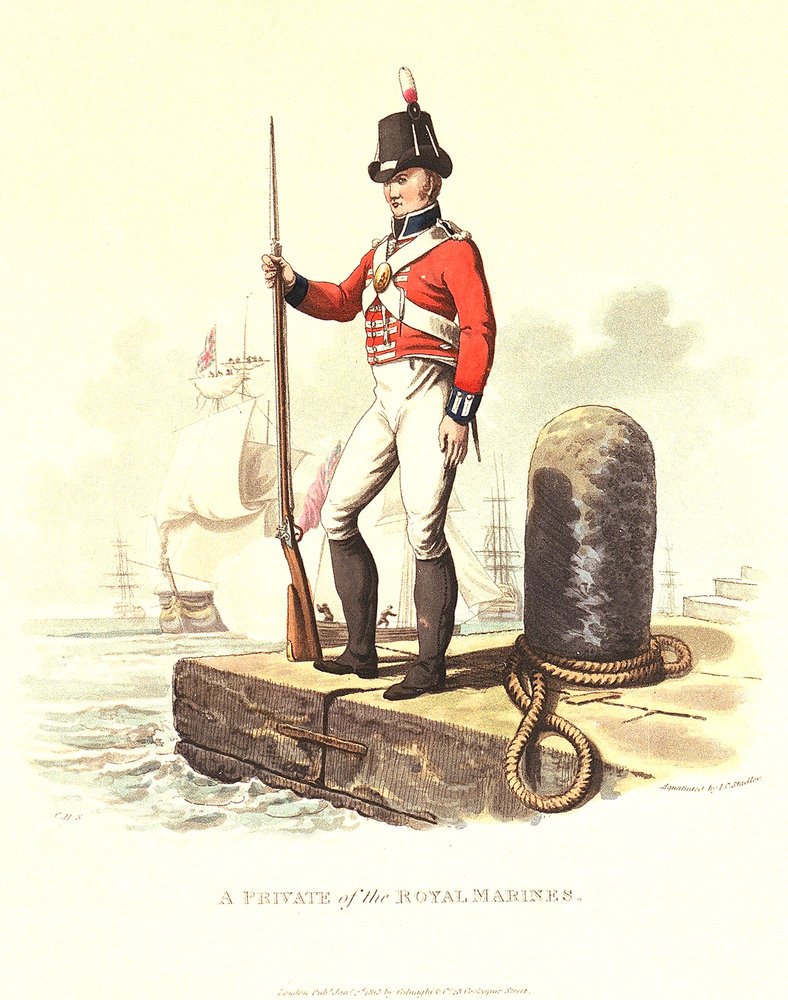
1815 engraving of a Royal Marine private

In the Caribbean theatre volunteers from freed French slaves on Marie-Galante were used to form the 1st Corps of Colonial Marines. These men bolstered the ranks, helping the British to hold the island until reinforcements arrived. This practice was repeated during the War of 1812, where escaped American slaves were formed into the 2nd Corps of Colonial Marines. These men were commanded by Royal Marines officers and fought alongside their regular Royal Marines counterparts at the Battle of Bladensburg in August 1814. During the battle a detachment of Royal Marine Artillery commanded by Lieutenant John Lawrence deployed Congreve rockets resulting in the rout of the US militiamen. The Royal Marines battalion and the 21st Regiment of Foot also took part in the Burning of Washington later that day.

Also present on shore during the Chesapeake campaign was a composite battalion of Marines, formed from ships' Marine detachments, frequently led by Captain John Robyns. A smaller composite battalion of about 100 men (23 officers, two of whom (John Wilson 1787–1850 and John Alexander Phillips 1790–1865) were Trafalgar veterans, and 80 other ranks) also took part in the Battle of New Orleans, under the command of Brevet Major Thomas Adair, in January 1815. The only British success at New Orleans was an attack on the west bank of the Mississippi River by a 700-man force, consisting of the 100 Royal Marines, 100 sailors under Captain Rowland Money, and 3 companies of the 85th Foot.

Throughout the war Royal Marines units raided up and down the east coast of America including up the Penobscot River and in the Chesapeake Bay. They later helped capture Fort Bowyer in Mobile Bay in what was the last action of the war.

With the onset of peace, the Royal Marines were reduced to a peacetime establishment set at one hundred and twenty companies (four of artillery) of 6,000 men.

=== Crimean War and beyond ===
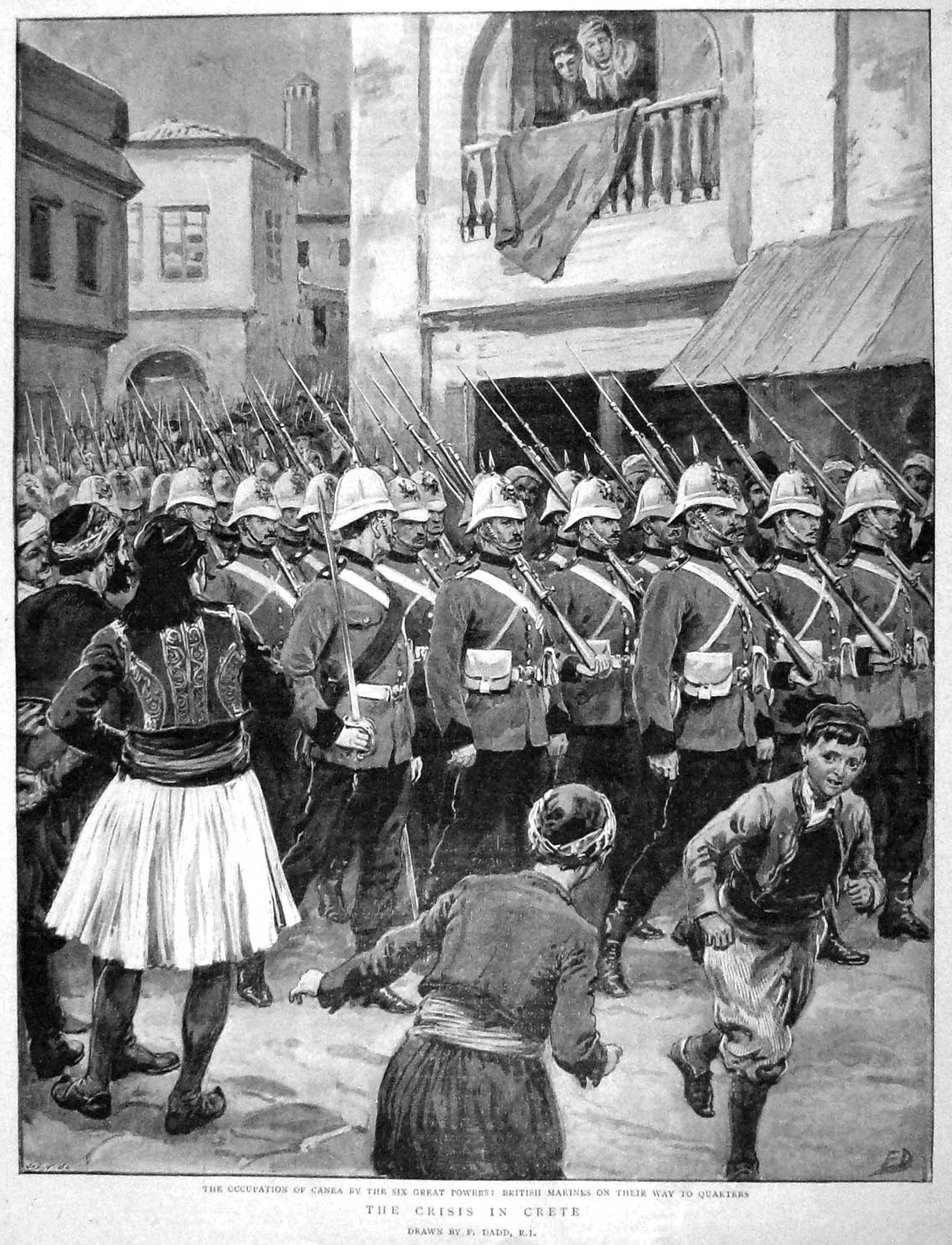
Royal Marines parade in the streets of Chania in Crete following the occupation of the island by the Great Powers (Britain, France, Italy, Germany, Austria-Hungary, and Russia) in spring 1897

In 1855, the marine Infantry forces were renamed the Royal Marines Light Infantry (RMLI) and in 1862 the name was slightly altered to Royal Marine Light Infantry. The Royal Navy only saw limited active service at sea after 1850 (until 1914) and became interested in developing the concept of landings by Naval Brigades. In these Naval Brigades, the function of the Royal Marines was to land first and act as skirmishers ahead of sailors trained as conventional infantry and artillery. This skirmishing was the traditional function of light infantry.

During the Crimean War in 1854 and 1855, three Royal Marines earned the Victoria Cross, two in the Crimea and one in the Baltic.

For most of their history, British Marines had been organised as fusiliers. In the rest of the 19th Century the Royal Marines served in many landings especially in the First and Second Opium Wars (1839–1842 and 1856–1860) against the Chinese. These were all successful except for the landing at the Mouth of the Peiho in 1859, where Admiral Sir James Hope ordered a landing across extensive mud flats.

== Early 20th century ==
The Royal Marines also played a prominent role in the Boxer Rebellion in China (1900), where a Royal Marine earned a further Corps Victoria Cross.

Pursuing a career in the Marines had been considered social suicide through much of the 18th and 19th centuries since Marine officers had a lower standing than their counterparts in the Royal Navy. An effort was made in 1907 through the common entry or "Selborne scheme" to reduce the professional differences between RN and RM officers through a system of common entry that provided for an initial period of service where both groups performed the same roles and underwent the same training.

For the first part of the 20th century, the Royal Marines' role was the traditional one of providing shipboard infantry for security, boarding parties and small-scale landings. The Marines' other traditional position on a Royal Navy ship was manning 'X' and 'Y' (the aftermost) gun turrets on a battleship or cruiser.

== First World War ==
During the First World War, in addition to their usual stations aboard ship, Royal Marines were part of the Royal Naval Division which landed in Belgium in 1914 to help defend Antwerp and later took part in the amphibious landing at Gallipoli in 1915. It also served on the Western Front. The division's first two commanders were Royal Marine Artillery Generals. Other Royal Marines acted as landing parties in the naval campaign against the Turkish fortifications in the Dardanelles before the Gallipoli landing. They were sent ashore to assess damage to Turkish fortifications after bombardment by British and French ships and, if necessary, to complete their destruction. The Royal Marines were the last to leave Gallipoli, replacing both British and French troops in a neatly planned and executed withdrawal from the beaches.

The Royal Marines also took part in the Zeebrugge Raid in 1918. Five Royal Marines earned the Victoria Cross in the First World War, two at Zeebrugge, one at Gallipoli, one at Jutland and one on the Western Front.

== Between the World Wars ==
After the war Royal Marines took part in the allied intervention in Russia. In 1919, the 6th Battalion RMLI mutinied and was disbanded at Murmansk. The Royal Marine Artillery (RMA) and Royal Marine Light Infantry (RMLI) were amalgamated on 22 June 1923. Post-war demobilisation had seen the Royal Marines reduced from 55,000 (1918) to 15,000 in 1922 and there was Treasury pressure for a further reduction to 6,000 or even the entire disbandment of the Corps. As a compromise an establishment of 9,500 was settled upon but this meant that two separate branches could no longer be maintained. The abandonment of the Marines' artillery role meant that the Corps would subsequently have to rely on Royal Artillery support when ashore, that the title of Royal Marines would apply to the entire Corps and that only a few specialists would now receive gunnery training. As a form of consolation the dark blue and red uniform of the Royal Marine Artillery now became the full dress of the entire Corps. Royal Marine officers and SNCOs however continue to wear the historic scarlet in mess dress to the present day. The ranks of Private, used by the RMLI, and Gunner, used by the RMA, were abolished and replaced by the rank of Marine.

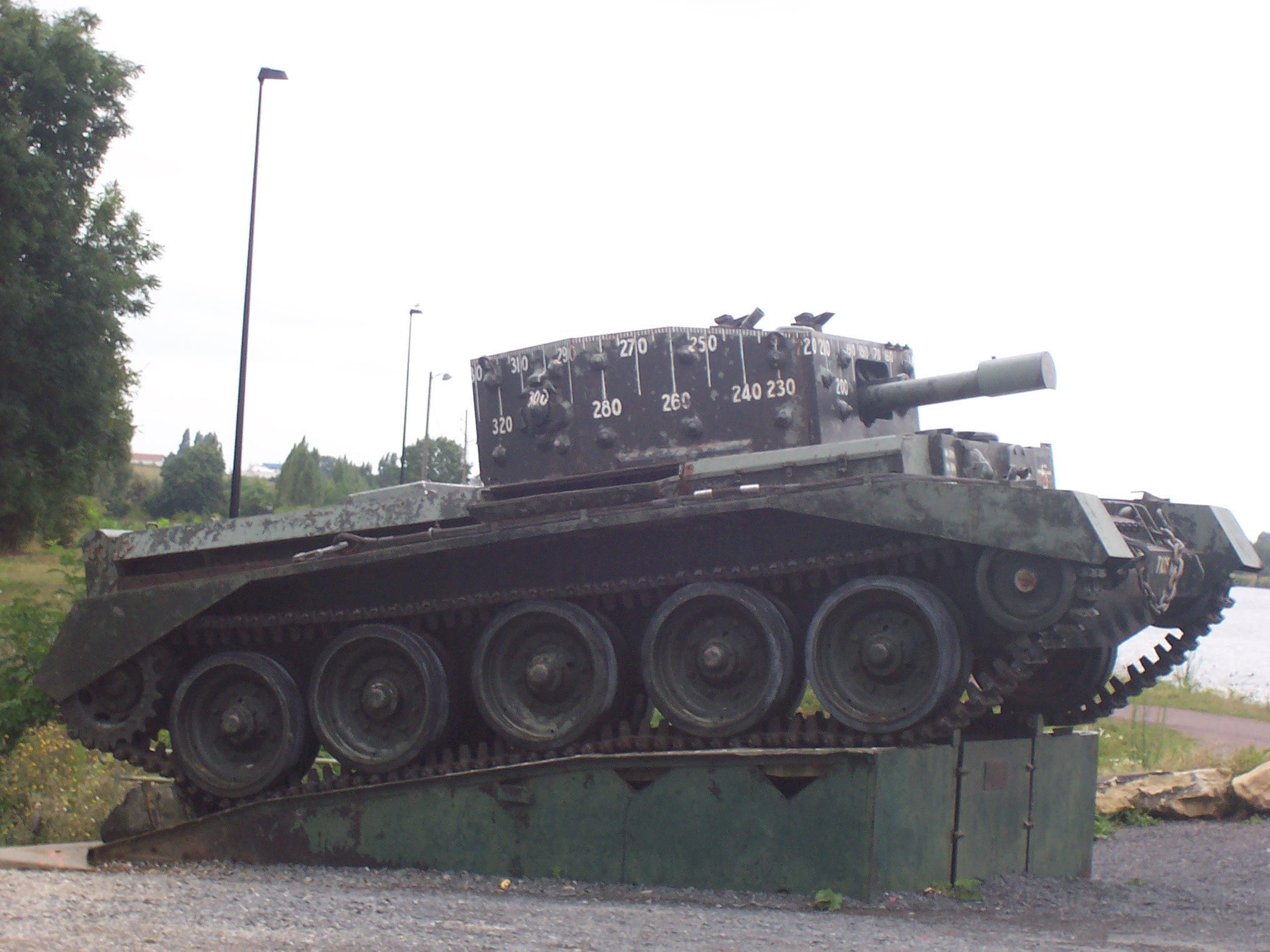
A Centaur IV tank belonging to the Royal Marines Armoured Support Group, which supported the D-Day landings at "La brèche d'Hermanville" on 6 June 1944.

== Second World War ==
During the Second World War, a small party of Royal Marines were first ashore at Namsos in April 1940, seizing the approaches to the Norwegian town preparatory to a landing by the British Army two days later. The Royal Marines formed the Royal Marines Division as an amphibiously trained division, parts of which served at Dakar and in the capture of Madagascar. After the assault on the French naval base at Antsirane in Madagascar was held up, fifty Sea Service Royal Marines from HMS Ramilles commanded by Captain Martin Price were landed on the quay of the base by the British destroyer HMS Anthony after it ran the gauntlet of French shore batteries defending Diego Suarez Bay. They then captured two of the batteries, which led to a quick surrender by the French.

In addition the Royal Marines formed Mobile Naval Base Defence Organisations (MNBDOs) similar to the United States Marine Corps Defense Battalions. One of these took part in the defence of Crete. Royal Marines also served in Malaya and in Singapore, where due to losses they were joined with remnants of the 2nd Battalion, Argyll and Sutherland Highlanders to form the "Plymouth Argylls".

The first Royal Marines commando unit was formed at Deal in Kent on 14 February 1942 and designated 'The Royal Marine Commando', shortly afterwards it was renamed A Commando and took part in the Dieppe Raid. One month after Dieppe, most of the 11th Royal Marine Battalion was killed or captured in an ill staged amphibious landing at Tobruk in Operation Agreement, again the Marines were involved with the Argyll and Sutherland Highlanders, this time the 1st Battalion. In 1942 the Infantry Battalions of the Royal Marine Division were re-organised as Commandos, joining the British Army Commandos. The Division command structure became a Special Service Brigade command. The support troops became landing craft crew and saw extensive action on D-Day in June 1944.

A total of four Special Service Brigades (later Commando brigade) were raised during the war, and Royal Marines were represented in all of them. A total of nine RM Commandos were raised during the war, numbered from 40 to 48. These were distributed as follows:

- 1 Commando Brigade
  - 45 (RM) Commando
- 2 Commando Brigade
  - 40 (RM) Commando
  - 43 (RM) Commando
- 3 Commando Brigade
  - 42 (RM) Commando
  - 44 (RM) Commando
- 4 Commando Brigade (entirely Royal Marine after March 1944)
  - 41 (RM) Commando
  - 46 (RM) Commando
  - 47 (RM) Commando
  - 48 (RM) Commando

1 Commando Brigade took part in first in the Tunisia Campaign and then assaults on Sicily and Normandy, campaigns in the Rhineland and crossing the Rhine. 2 Commando Brigade was involved in the Salerno landings, Anzio, Comacchio, and operations in the Argenta Gap. 3 Commando Brigade served in Sicily and Burma. 4 Commando Brigade served in the Battle of Normandy and in the Battle of the Scheldt on the island of Walcheren during the clearing of Antwerp.

In January 1945, two further RM brigades were formed, 116th Brigade and 117th Brigade. Both were conventional infantry, rather than in the commando role. 116th Brigade saw some action in the Netherlands, but 117th Brigade was hardly used operationally.

A number of Royal Marines served as pilots during the Second World War. It was a Royal Marines officer who led the attack by a formation of Blackburn Skuas that sank the Königsberg. Eighteen Royal Marines commanded Fleet Air Arm squadrons during the course of the war, and with the formation of the British Pacific Fleet were well-represented in the final drive on Japan. Captains and majors generally commanded squadrons, whilst in one case Lt. Colonel R.C. Hay on HMS Indefatigable was Air Group Co-ordinator from HMS Victorious of the entire British Pacific Fleet.

Crews for the UK's landing craft were initially drawn from the Royal Navy, after 1 April 1943 this responsibility was transferred to the Royal Marines. RM officers did a preliminary 9 week course 6 at HMS Eastney and 3 weeks in craft at HMS Northney (Hayling Island). From there they were appointed to HMS Helder or HMS Effingham for 6 week courses in training with their crews.

They also provided the crews for the UK's minor landing craft, and the Royal Marines Armoured Support Group manned Centaur IV tanks on D Day; one of these is still on display at Pegasus Bridge.

Only one Marine (Corporal Thomas Peck Hunter of 43 Commando) was awarded the Victoria Cross in the Second World War for action at Lake Comacchio in Italy. Hunter was the most recent RM commando to be awarded the medal.

The Royal Marines Boom Patrol Detachment under Blondie Haslar carried out Operation Frankton and provided the basis for the post-war continuation of the SBS.

== After 1945 ==
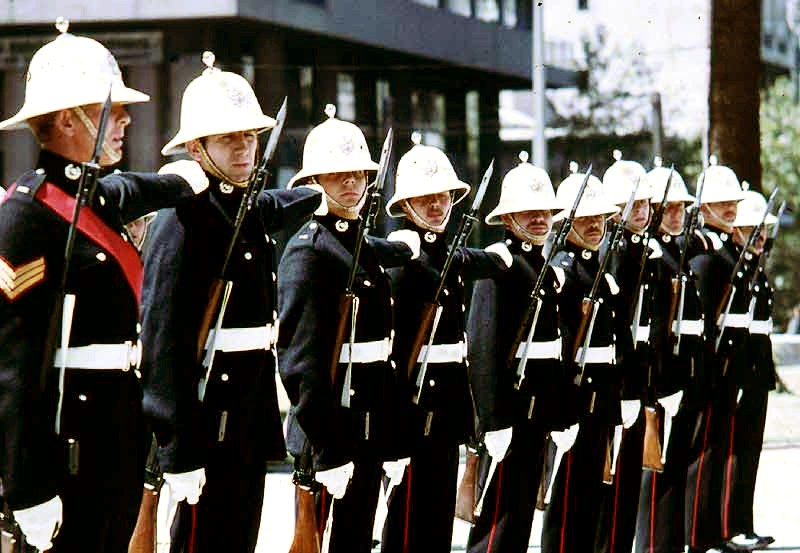
Royal Marines in 1972

In 1946 the Army Commandos were disbanded, leaving the Royal Marines to continue the commando role (with supporting army elements).

Royal Marines were involved in the Korean War. 41 (Independent) Commando was reformed in 1950, and was originally envisaged as a raiding force for use against North Korea. It performed this role in partnership with the United States Navy until after the landing of United States Army X Corps at Wonsan. It then joined the US's 1st Marine Division at Koto-Ri. As Task Force Drysdale with Lt. Col. D.B. Drysdale RM in command, 41 Commando, a USMC company, a US Army company and part of the divisional train fought their way from Koto-Ri to Hagaru after the Chinese had blocked the road to the North. It then took part in the famous withdrawal from Chosin Reservoir. After that, a small amount of raiding followed, before the Marines were withdrawn from the conflict in 1951. It received the Presidential Citation after the USMC got the regulations modified to allow foreign units to receive the award.

After playing a part in the long-running Malayan Emergency, the next action came in 1956, during the Suez Crisis. Headquarters 3 Commando Brigade, and Nos 40, 42 and 45 Commandos took part in the operation. It marked the first time that a helicopter assault was used operationally to land troops in an amphibious attack. British and French forces defeated the Egyptians, but after pressure from the United States, and French domestic pressure, they backed down.

In September 1955 45 Commando was deployed to Cyprus to undertake anti-terrorist operations against the EOKA guerrillas during the independence war against the British. The EOKA were a small, but powerful organisation of Greek Cypriots, who had great local support from the Greek community. The unit, based in Malta at the time travelled to the Kyrenia mountain area of the island and in December 1955 launched Operation Foxhunter, an operation to destroy EOKA's main base.

Further action in the Far East was seen during the Indonesia–Malaysia confrontation. Nos 40 and 42 Commando went to Borneo at various times to help keep Indonesian forces from worsening situations in the neighbouring region, in what was an already heated part of the world, with conflicts in Cambodia, Laos and Vietnam. During the campaign there was a company-strength amphibious assault by Lima Company of 42 Commando at the town of Limbang to rescue hostages. The Limbang raid saw three of the 150 marines involved decorated, L company 42 commando are still referred to today as Limbang Company in memory of this archetypal commando raid.

In January 1964, part of the Tanzanian Army mutinied. Within 24 hours elements of 41 Commando had left Bickleigh Camp, Plymouth, Devon, and were travelling by air to Nairobi, Kenya, continuing by road into Tanzania. At the same time, Commandos aboard HMS Bulwark sailed to East Africa and anchored off-shore from Dar es Salaam, Tanzania. The revolt was put down and the next six months were spent in touring Tanzanian military out-posts disarming military personnel.

From 1969 onwards, Royal Marine units regularly deployed to Northern Ireland during The Troubles, during the course of which 13 were killed in action. A further eleven died in the Deal barracks bombing of the Royal Marines School of Music in 1989.

Between 1974 and 1984, the Royal Marines undertook three United Nations tours of duty in Cyprus. The first was in November 1974, when 41 Commando took over the Limassol District from the 2nd Battalion of the Guards Brigade, following the Turkish invasion, and became the first commando to wear the light blue berets of the UN when they began the Corps' first six-month tour with the UN forces in Cyprus (UNIFCYP).

The Falklands War provided the backdrop to the next action of the Royal Marines. Argentina invaded the islands in April 1982. A British task force was immediately despatched to recapture them, and given that an amphibious assault would be necessary, the Royal Marines were heavily involved. 3 Commando Brigade was brought to full combat strength, with not only 40, 42 and 45 Commandos, but also the 2nd and 3rd Battalions of the Parachute Regiment attached. The troops were landed at San Carlos Water at the western end of East Falkland, and proceeded to "yomp" across the entire island to the capital, Stanley, which fell on 14 June 1982 to 2nd Battalion The Parachute Regiment. A Royal Marines divisional headquarters was deployed, under Major-General Jeremy Moore, who was commander of British land forces during the war.

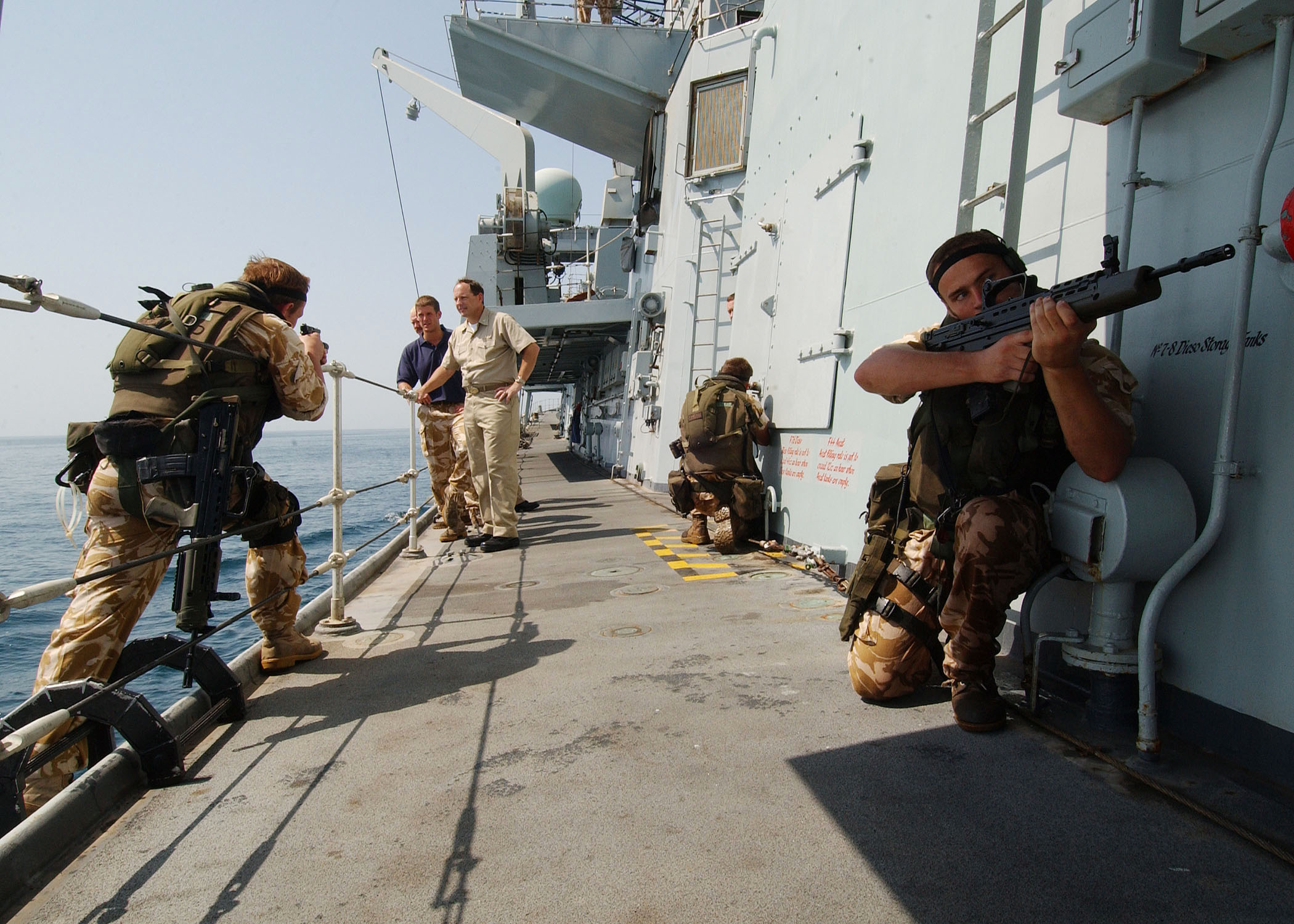
Boarding procedures demonstrated by Royal Marines on the frigate HMS Somerset in the Persian Gulf, in 2004

The main element of 3 Commando Brigade was not deployed in the 1991 Gulf War. However, 24 men from K Company, 42 Commando Royal Marines were deployed as six-man teams aboard two Royal Navy destroyers and frigates. They were used as ship boarding parties and took part in numerous boardings of suspect shipping. There were also further elements deployed to provide protection of shipping whilst in ports throughout the Gulf. The main element of 3 Commando Brigade was deployed to northern Iraq in the aftermath to provide aid to the Iraqi Kurds as part of Operation Safe Haven.

In 1992 recruiting into the RM Band Service was opened to females.

From 2000 onwards, the Royal Marines began converting from their traditional light infantry role with the introduction of the Commando 21 concept, an emphasis on force protection leading to the introduction of the Viking, the first armoured vehicle to be operated by the Royal Marines for half a century.

In November 2001, after the seizure of Bagram Air Base by the Special Boat Service, Charlie Company of 40 Commando became the first British regular forces into Afghanistan, using Bagram Air base to support British and US Special Forces Operations.

2002 saw the deployment of 45 Commando Royal Marines to Afghanistan, where contact with enemy forces was expected to be heavy. However little action was seen, with no Al-Qaeda or Taliban forces being found or engaged.

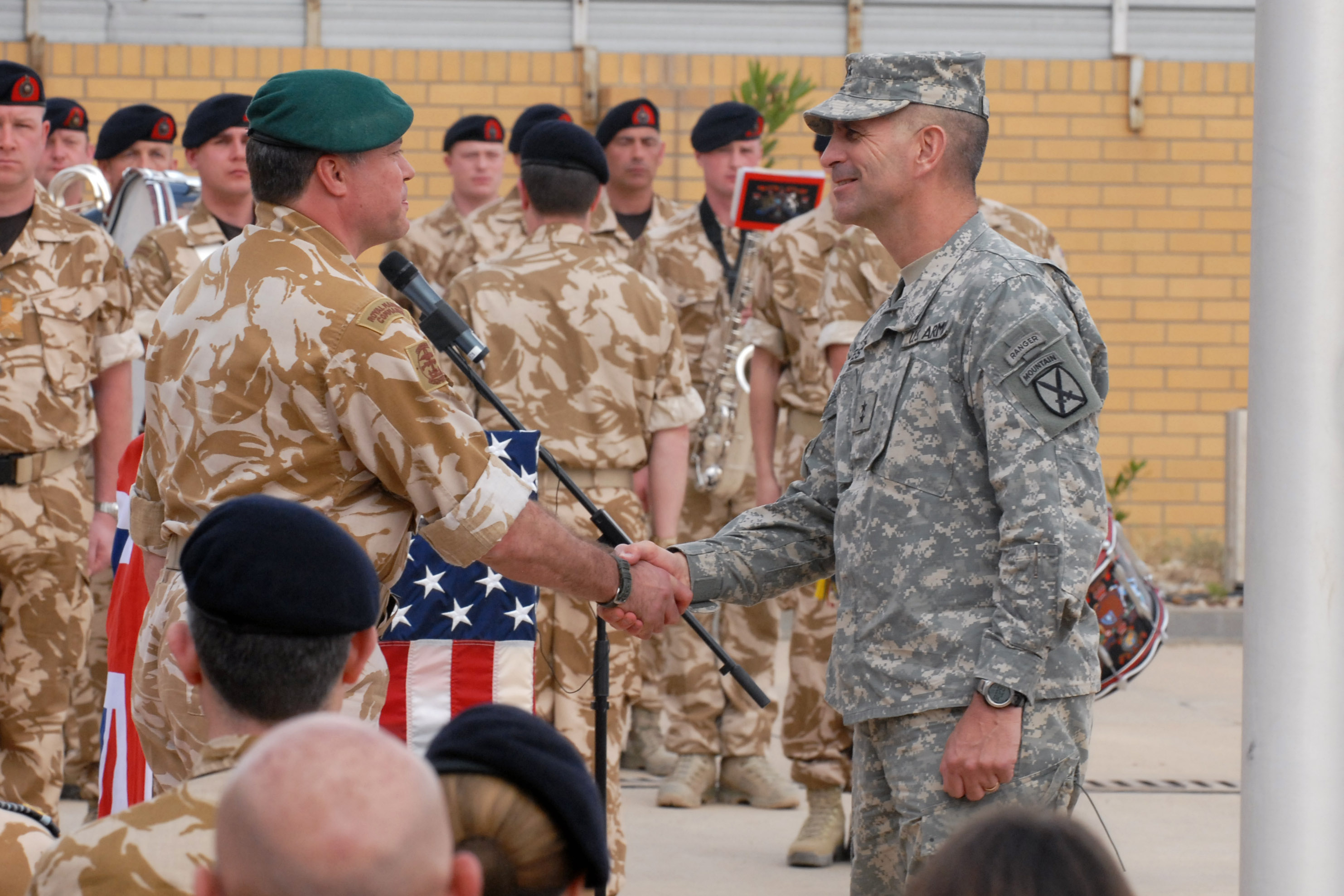
Royal Marines Maj. Gen. Andy Salmon, Multi-National Division-Southeast commander, and US Army Maj. Gen. Michael Oates in Basra, Iraq in 2009. RMBS personnel are behind.

3 Commando Brigade deployed on Operation TELIC, the British involvement in the Iraq war, in early 2003 with the USMC's 15th Marine Expeditionary Unit under its command. The Brigade conducted an amphibious assault on the Al-Faw Peninsula in Iraq in support of US Navy SEALs. The 15th Marine Expeditionary Unit and 42 Commando securing the port of Umm Qasr and 40 Commando conducting a helicopter assault in order to secure the oil installations to assure continued operability of Iraq's export capability. The attack proceeded well, with light casualties. 3 Commando Brigade served as part of the US 1st Marine Division and received the US Presidential Unit Citation, in fact the 2nd time in 50 years the Royal Marines received this.

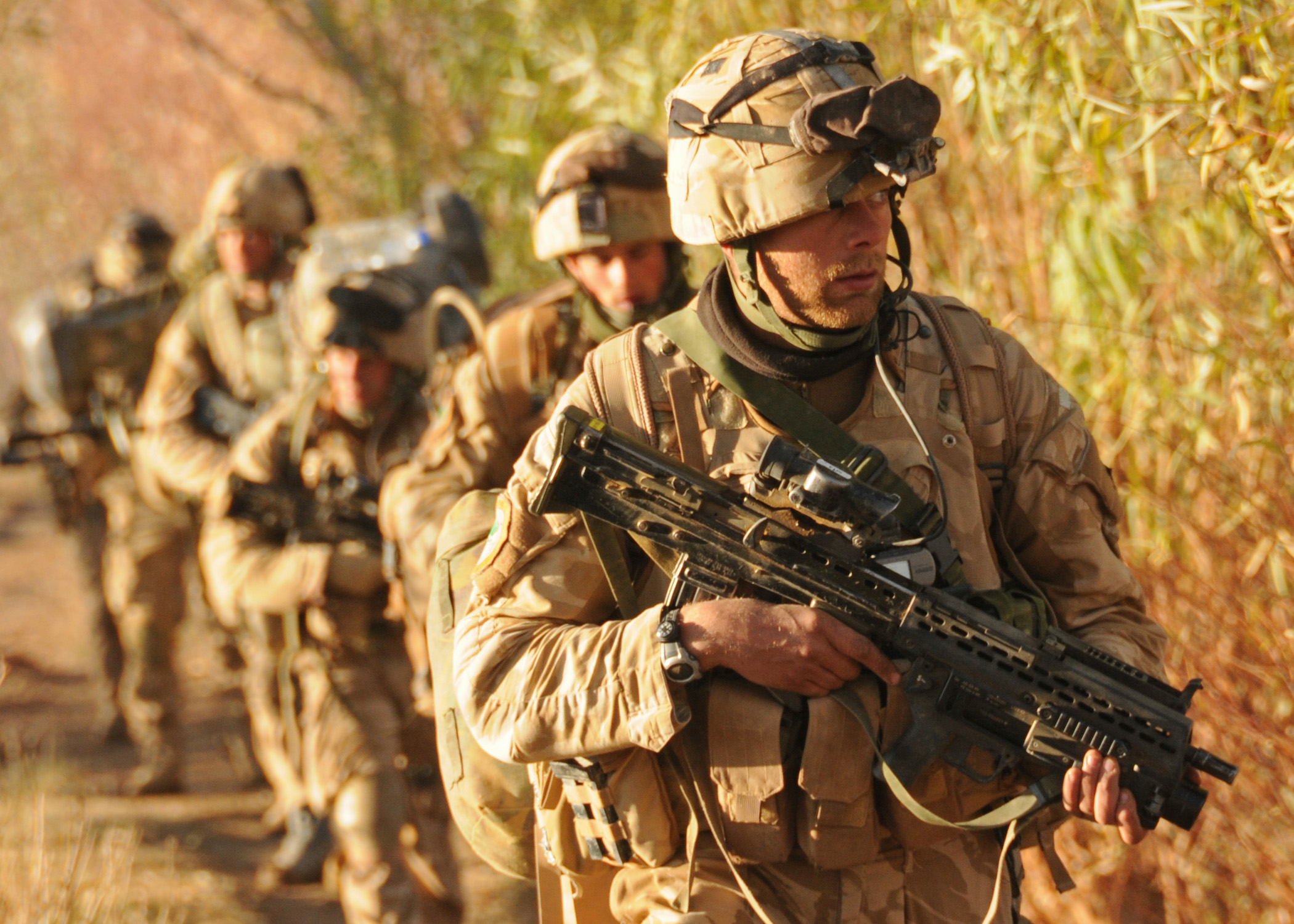
Royal Marines in Afghanistan in January 2009

In 2004, Iranian armed forces took Royal Navy personnel prisoner, including six Royal Marines, on the Shatt al-Arab (Arvand Rud in Persian) river, between Iran and Iraq. They were released three days later following diplomatic discussions between the UK and Iran.

In November 2006, 3 Commando Brigade relieved 16 Air Assault Brigade of the British Army in Helmand Province, Afghanistan, as part of Operation Herrick.

In 2007, Iranian armed forces also took prisoner Royal Navy personnel, including seven Royal Marines, when a boarding party from HMS Cornwall was seized in the waters between Iran and Iraq, in the Persian Gulf.

In 2008, Lance-Corporal Matthew Croucher of 40 Commando was awarded the George Cross (GC) after throwing himself on a grenade to save the lives of the other marines in his patrol, in Afghanistan. Remarkably, he managed to keep his rucksack between himself and the grenade, and that, together with his body armour, meant he suffered only very minor injuries.

In 2018, women became eligible to apply for all roles in the British forces, including the Royal Marines beyond the Band Service where they have served since 1992.

In 2024, 3 Commando Brigade was rebranded as the United Kingdom Commando Force (UKCF).

== Shore bases ==
When first permanently established (1755), the Marines were formed into three Divisions based in the three principal Royal Navy Dockyards: Portsmouth, Chatham and Plymouth.

=== 18th century ===
The Royal Marines was the first complete British corps to be provided with its own barracks – one for each Division:

- The Royal Marine Barracks, Portsmouth were established in 1768 but the premises did not prove altogether satisfactory, and in 1848 the Portsmouth Division was relocated to Forton Barracks in nearby Gosport.
- The Royal Marine Barracks, Chatham was opened in 1779 and remained in use until 1950 (when Chatham ceased to operate as a naval base).
- The Royal Marine Barracks, Plymouth were established in 1756 and, as Stonehouse Barracks still form the headquarters of 3 Commando Brigade.

=== 19th and 20th centuries ===
In 1805 a fourth division was established, based at Woolwich (site of another Royal Dockyard). The Royal Marine Barracks, Woolwich and Infirmary were built there (in Frances Street) between 1842 and 1848; both were progressive designs for their time. After the closure of the dockyard, the division was disbanded (1869). The buildings were handed over to the army and were renamed Cambridge Barracks: they were largely demolished in 1975 but the gatehouse remains.

In 1861 the Royal Marine Depot, Deal was established alongside the important naval anchorage known as the Downs. It was initially served by Marines from the Chatham, Portsmouth and Woolwich Divisions. The Depot remained in service until 1991 although the Royal Marines School of Music remained on site until 1996.

The Royal Marine Artillery was initially based at Chatham, but in 1824 was moved to its own dedicated barracks, Gunwharf Barracks, in Portsmouth. In 1858 the Royal Marine Artillery moved from there to Fort Cumberland (which continued to be used for gunnery training into the 20th century). The establishment of the Royal Marine Artillery as a separate unit in 1859 led to Eastney Barracks being built to accommodate them; the barracks were opened at Eastney in 1867.

Following the amalgamation of the RM Artillery and Light Infantry in 1923, Forton Barracks was closed and Eastney became the Corps' main base in Portsmouth. Eastney Barracks remained the Corps Headquarters until 1995, when it was sold and converted to private housing.

== See also ==
- 4th Special Service Brigade
- Corps of Colonial Marines
- History of the Royal Navy
- Royal Marines Band Service
- Royal Marines Museum
- Uniforms of the Royal Marines

== Sources ==
- Akins, Thomas Beamish (1895). History of Halifax. Brookhouse Press. ISBN 978-1298600462.
- Ballantyne, Iain (2004). Strike From the Sea. Pen & Sword. ISBN 978-1844150595.
- Brooks, Richard (2002). The Royal Marines : 1664 to the present. London: Constable. ISBN 978-0-09-480390-9.
- Brooks, Richard; Little, Matthew (2008). Tracing Your Royal Marine Ancestors: A Guide for Family Historians. Pen & Sword, Barnsley. ISBN 978-1844158690.
- Chappell, Mike (2004). Wellington's Peninsula Regiments (2): The Light Infantry. Oxford: Osprey Publishing. ISBN 978-1-84176-403-0.
- Chartrand, Rene (2002). Colonial American Troops, 1610–1774. Vol. 1. Osprey Publishing. ISBN 978-1841763248.
- Edye, Lourenço (1893). The Historical Records of the Royal Marines. Vol. v. 1. London: Harrison & Sons.
- Francis, David (1975). The First Peninsular War: 1702–1713. Ernest Benn. ISBN 978-0510002053.
- French, David (2015). Fighting EOKA: The British Counter-Insurgency Campaign on Cyprus, 1955-1959. Oxford University Press. ISBN 978-0198729341.
- Gleig, George Robert (1827). The campaigns of the British army at Washington and New Orleans in the years 1814-1815. John Murray, London.
- Heidler, David; Heidler, Jeanne (2004). Encyclopedia of the War of 1812. Naval Institute Press. ISBN 978-1591143628.
- Henn, Francis (2004). Business of Some Heat: The United Nations Force in Cyprus 1972-74. Pen & Sword. ISBN 978-1844150816.
- Lenihan, Padraig (2008). Consolidating Conquest, Ireland 1603–1727. Pearson Education. ISBN 978-0582772175.
- Moore, John (1989). The First Fleet Marines. University of Queensland Press. ISBN 978-0702220654.
- Mountbatten, Lord Louis (1943). Combined Operations: The Official Story of the Commandos. New York, The Macmillan Company.
- Neillands, Robin (2004). By Sea and Land: The Story of the Royal Marine Commandos. Barnsley: Pen & Sword Classics. ISBN 1-84415-043-7.
- Nicolas, Paul (1845). Historical record of the Royal marine forces. Thomas and Boone, London.
- Pappalardo, Bruno (2019). How to Survive in the Georgian Navy: A Sailor's Guide. London: Osprey Publishing. ISBN 978-1-47-283086-9.
- Taylor, Matthew (2026). Black Redcoats: The Corps of Colonial Marines (second ed.). Barnsley, Yorkshire: Pen and Sword Books. ISBN 978-1-39-903402-9.
