= General (United Kingdom) =

Highest military rank of the British Army

- Army No. 2 and Royal Marines No. 1B service uniform insignia

- Motor car star plate
- Country: United Kingdom
- Service branch: British Army; Royal Marines
- Abbreviation: Gen
- Rank group: General officers
- Rank: Four-star rank
- NATO rank code: OF-9
- Next higher rank: Field marshal (British Army); none (Royal Marines)
- Next lower rank: Lieutenant general
- Equivalent ranks: Admiral (RN); Air chief marshal (RAF)

General (or full general to distinguish it from the lower general officer ranks) is the highest rank achievable by serving officers of the British Army and the Royal Marines.

It ranks above lieutenant-general and, in the Army, is subordinate to the rank of field marshal, which is now awarded as an honorary rank only. In the Royal Marines, the rank can be held by officers in tri-service posts, for example, Generals Sir Gordon Messenger and Sir Gwyn Jenkins, former Vice-Chiefs of the Defence Staff.

The rank of general is equivalent to a full admiral in the Royal Navy or an air chief marshal in the Royal Air Force. It has a NATO-code of OF-9, and is a four-star rank.

Officers holding the ranks of general, lieutenant-general and major-general are 'general officers' and may be addressed as 'general'.

== Insignia ==
A general officer's insignia is a crossed sword and baton. This appeared on its own for the now obsolete rank of brigadier-general. A major-general has a pip over this emblem; a lieutenant-general a crown instead of a pip; and a full general both a pip and a crown. The insignia for the highest rank, that of Field Marshal, consists of crossed batons within a wreath and surmounted by a crown.

== See also ==
- British and U.S. military ranks compared
- British Army Other Ranks rank insignia
- British Army officer rank insignia
- List of British Army full generals
- List of Royal Marines full generals
- List of British generals and brigadiers
