= Hamilton Road Cemetery, Deal =

Cemetery in South East England

Coordinates: 51.213°N 1.391°E

Hamilton Road Cemetery
- Commonwealth War Graves Commission
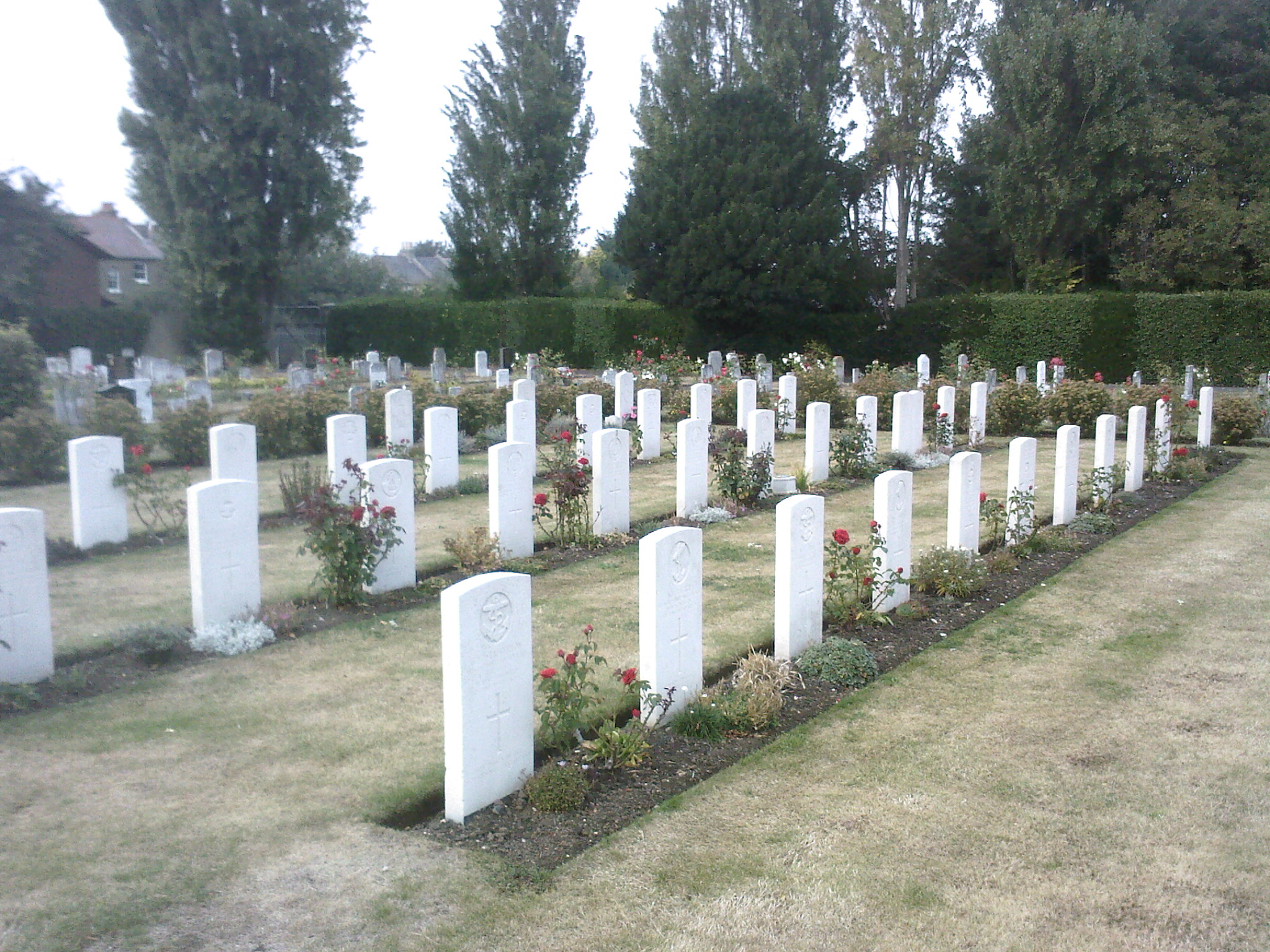
- Used for those deceased between 1914–1920 and 1939–45, also 1989.
- Established: 1856 (consecrated)
- Location: near Deal, Kent, England
- Total burials: 247 War Graves (66 of which are WW2 civilian deaths)

Hamilton Road Cemetery is a combined municipal and military burial ground situated in the coastal town of Deal, Kent, in South East England. Opened in May 1856, it was created to provide a new burial ground for Deal at a time when its general population was expanding and when previous, often ad hoc facilities for dealing with deaths in the area no longer sufficed.

The cemetery's civilian burials are managed by Dover Council, and its military burials by the Commonwealth War Graves Commission. It contains a Cross of Sacrifice of some significance and the burials of military service personnel from Great Britain, Belgium, Canada, and, very unusually, Nazi Germany, many of whom took part in some of the most famous incidents in World War I and World War II, including: the Gallipoli Campaign, the Battle of the Somme, the 1918 Zeebrugge Raid, the Battle of Dunkirk, the Battle of the Denmark Strait and sinking of HMS Hood, the Battle of Britain, and the more modern tragedy of the Deal barracks bombing in September 1989.

It also contains 66 local civilian war dead from World War II killed by German bombing and shelling between 1940 and 1945, 127 military burials from World War I (including three unidentified Naval ratings), and 54 from World War II.

There is a small mortuary chapel associated with the cemetery, but no dedicated church as such.

== 1914–1920 ==
=== Notable Army and Royal Marine interments from 1914–1920 ===
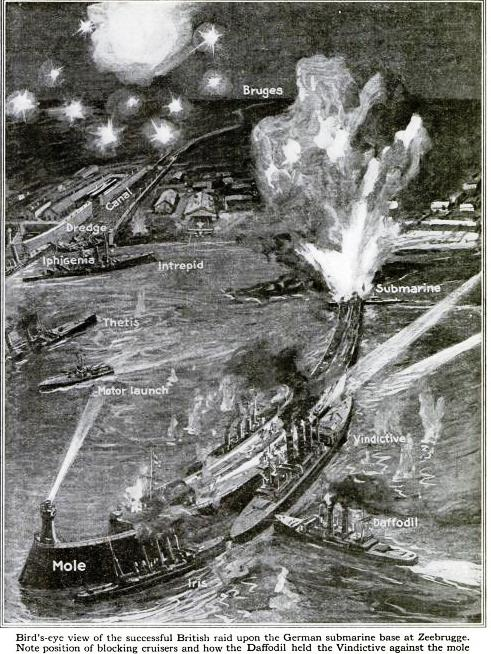
Graphic depiction of the Zeebrugge Raid in World War I

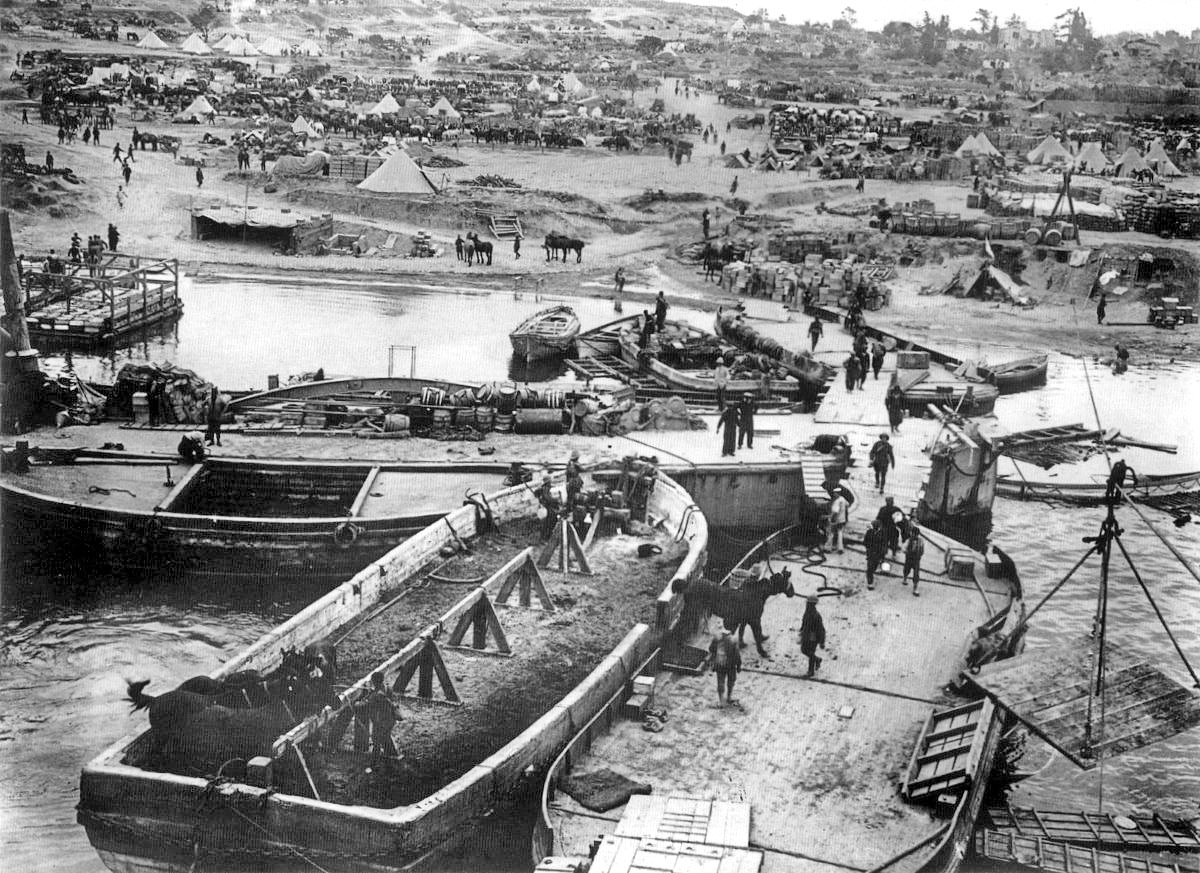
Cape Helles, Gallipoli, 6 May 1915

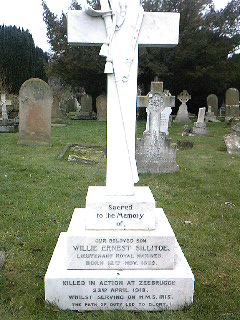
The Grave of Lieutenant "Willie" Ernest Sillitoe, Killed in Action aboard HMS Iris, 23 April 1918, in the Zeebrugge Raid.

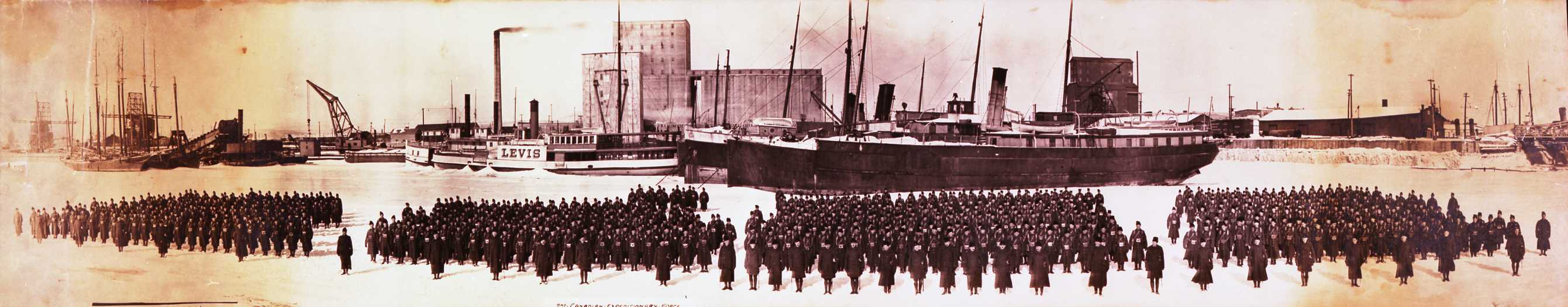
The 23rd Infantry Battalion, Second Canadian Expeditionary Force, Quebec City, Canada.

The first military burials date from 1914, and the majority of the cemetery's military interments belong to the Great War rather than to World War II. There are also some Royal Marines Light Infantry burials dating to 1919 and 1920, additionally, and quite a number of graves of Canadian nationals. Notable graves include:

1. The graves of two of the Royal Marines killed in the 1918 Zeebrugge Raid on 23 April of that year: Private John Bostock, CH/19897, and Lieutenant William Edward Sillitoe. Both were from the Royal Marine Light Infantry 4th Battalion.
2. The grave of Private Arthur Maltby, listed as service number 126276, The Royal Montreal Regiment. He died on 27 April 1918. His parents are listed as being Arthur and Elizabeth Maltby, of 256, Huron Street, Stratford, Ontario, Canada, though he is listed as being born in Nottingham, in England. He enlisted in Stratford, Ontario, Canada, on 9 September 1915, aged 20 years and nine months.
3. The grave of Private William Hawley, from the 24th Battalion (Victoria Rifles), from the Canadian Expeditionary Force, regimental number 919811, who died aged 20 on 10 October 1918, just one month before the end of the Great War. Private Hawley was the son of Peter and Mary Hawley, of 114A, Forfar St, Montreal, Quebec he was also not born in Canada, but in County Kerry in Ireland.
4. The grave of Royal Marines Major-general Sir David Mercer, KCB, and holder of the rank of Commandeur of the French Légion d'honneur. Twice mentioned in dispatches, he served in France, Flanders, and in the Gallipoli Campaign. He was associated with the Band of the Royal Marine Light Infantry (Chatham Division), who by his permission played in a World War I memorial concert at St Paul's Cathedral on 19 November 1918.

=== Notable naval interments 1914–1920 ===
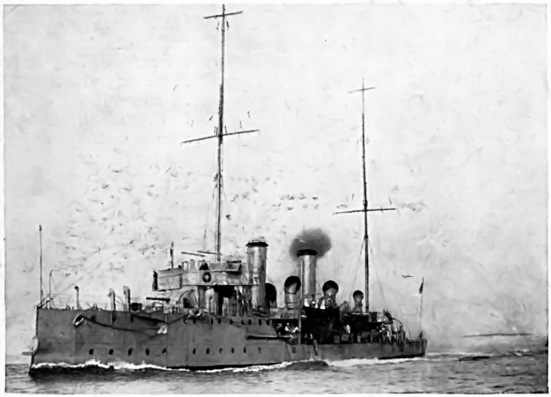
HMS Niger, 1892–1914

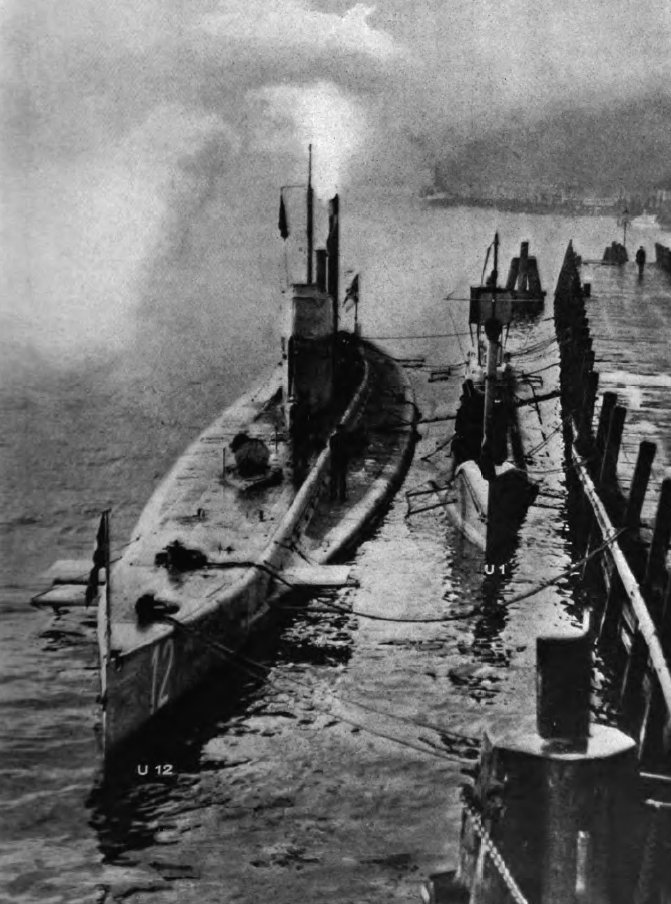
German Submarine U-12

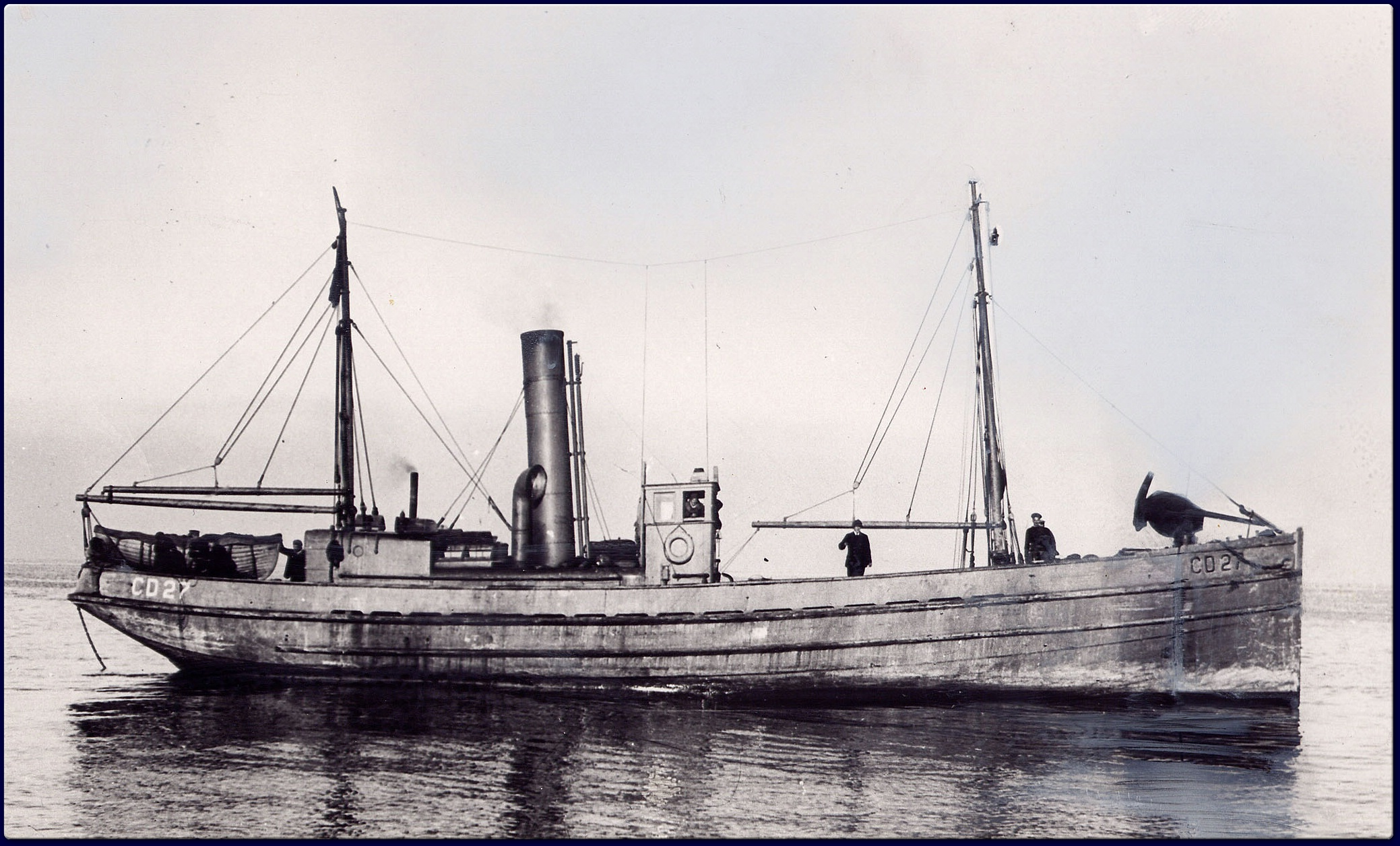
A Canadian Armed Drifter

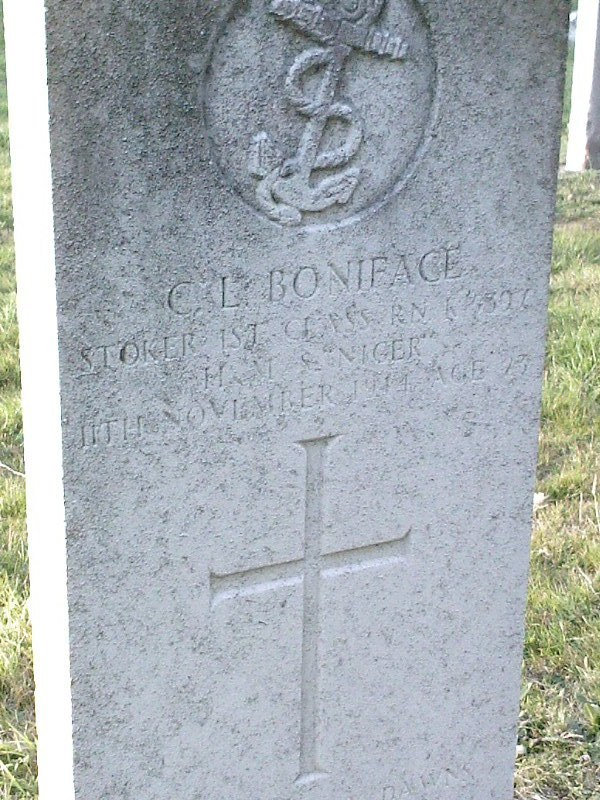
The grave of Stoker 1st Class Boniface from HMS Niger.
1. The grave of C. L. Boniface, Stoker 1st Class, Service Number K/5397/PO. The minesweeper he served on, HMS Niger was torpedoed and sunk off Deal on 11 November 1914, possibly by the German submarine U-12. Stoker Boniface was 23 years old at the time of his death, and was the son of George and Elizabeth Boniface of 1, Manor Cottages, Felpham, Bognor Regis.
2. The grave of Victor Joseph Benoit, son of Joseph Benoit, of Cape St. George, Newfoundland, from the Dominion of Newfoundland, a Royal Naval Reserve Ordinary Seaman who served on the HM Armed Naval drifter Frons Olivae, which hit a Naval mine off Ramsgate on 12 October 1915 in an explosion which sunk the ship and killed most of the Anglo-Canadian crew, including Able Seaman George Files, Engineman Albert Brown, Seaman James Walker Hynes, Lieutenant Thomas Evan Rogers, and coal trimmer Francis (Frank) Robert Newark. Other casualties included Seaman George H. Le Drew from the Newfoundland Royal Naval Reserve, Engineman Charles Leggett from the Royal Naval Reserve, the Skipper; George S. Meale, Seaman Stephen Sparkes from the Newfoundland Royal Naval Reserve, and Deck Hand William M. Wooldridge, also from the Newfoundland Royal Naval Reserve.
3. The grave of Ordinary Seaman Joseph Arsenault, Royal Naval Canadian Volunteer Reserve, Regimental Number VR/3512, from the shore base of HMS Pembroke, who died on 16 June 1917 of unknown causes.

== 1921–1939: The Deal Cross of Sacrifice ==
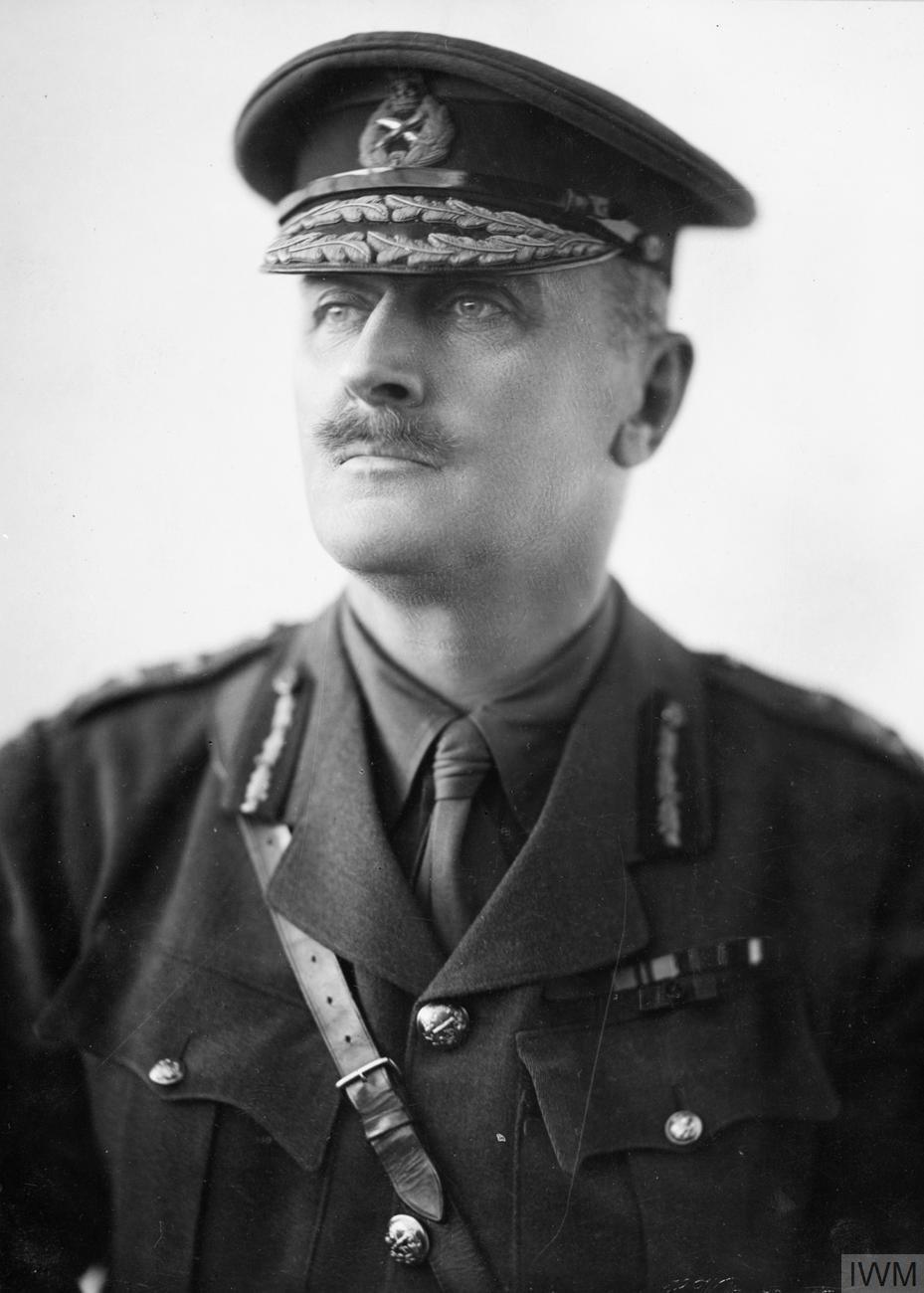
Field Marshal Allenby

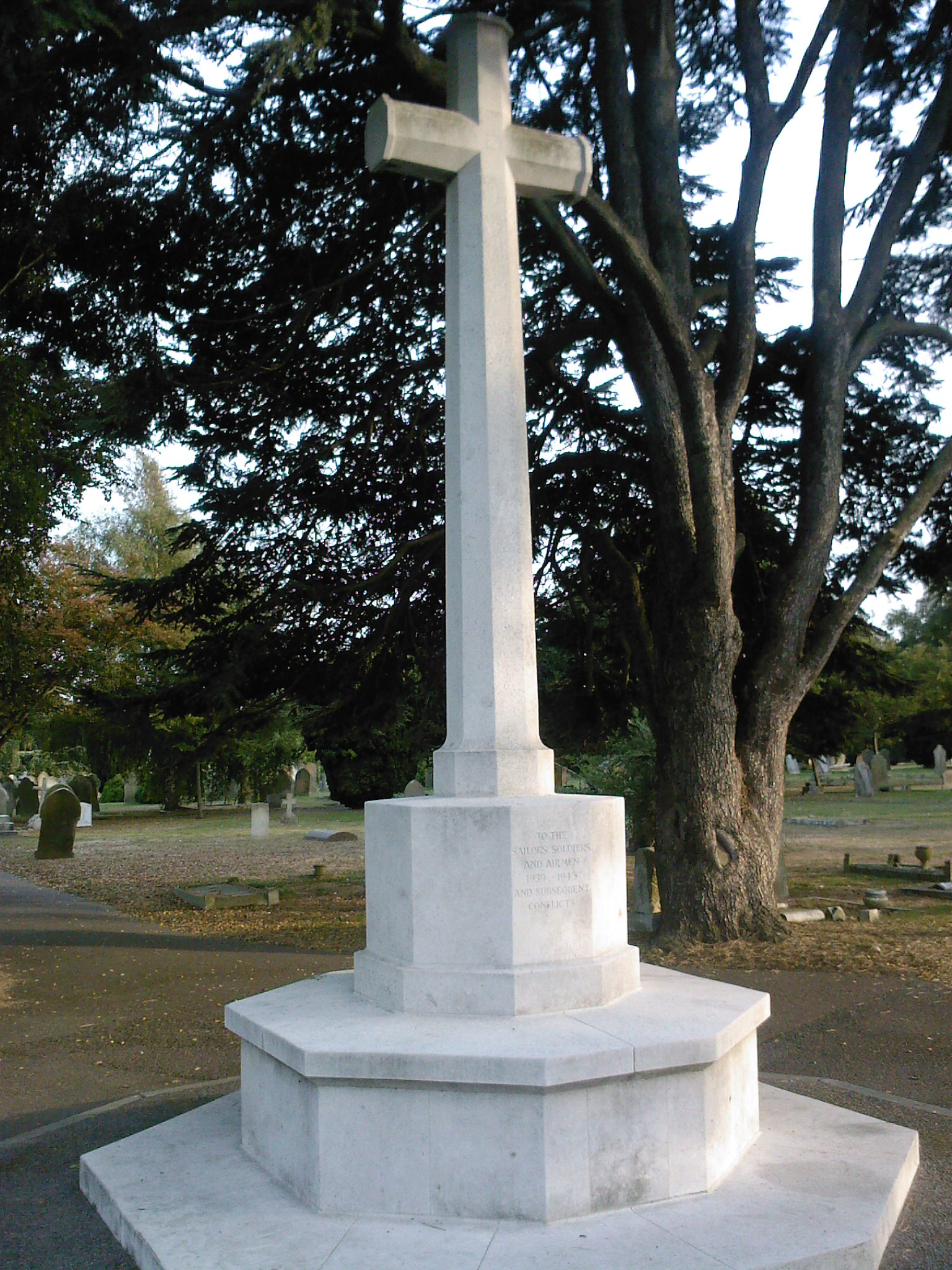
The Deal Cross of Sacrifice

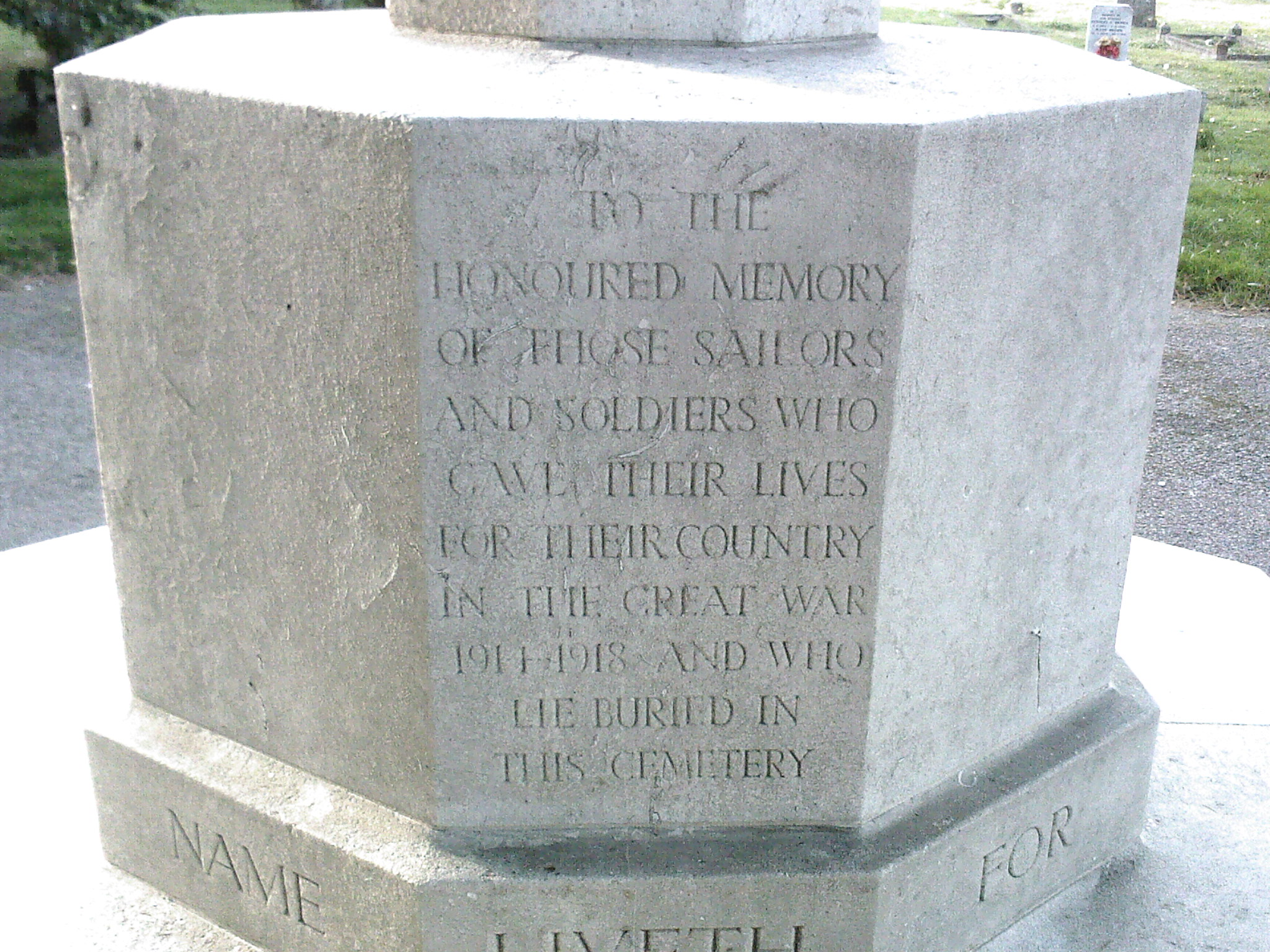
The Deal Cross of Sacrifice Inscription

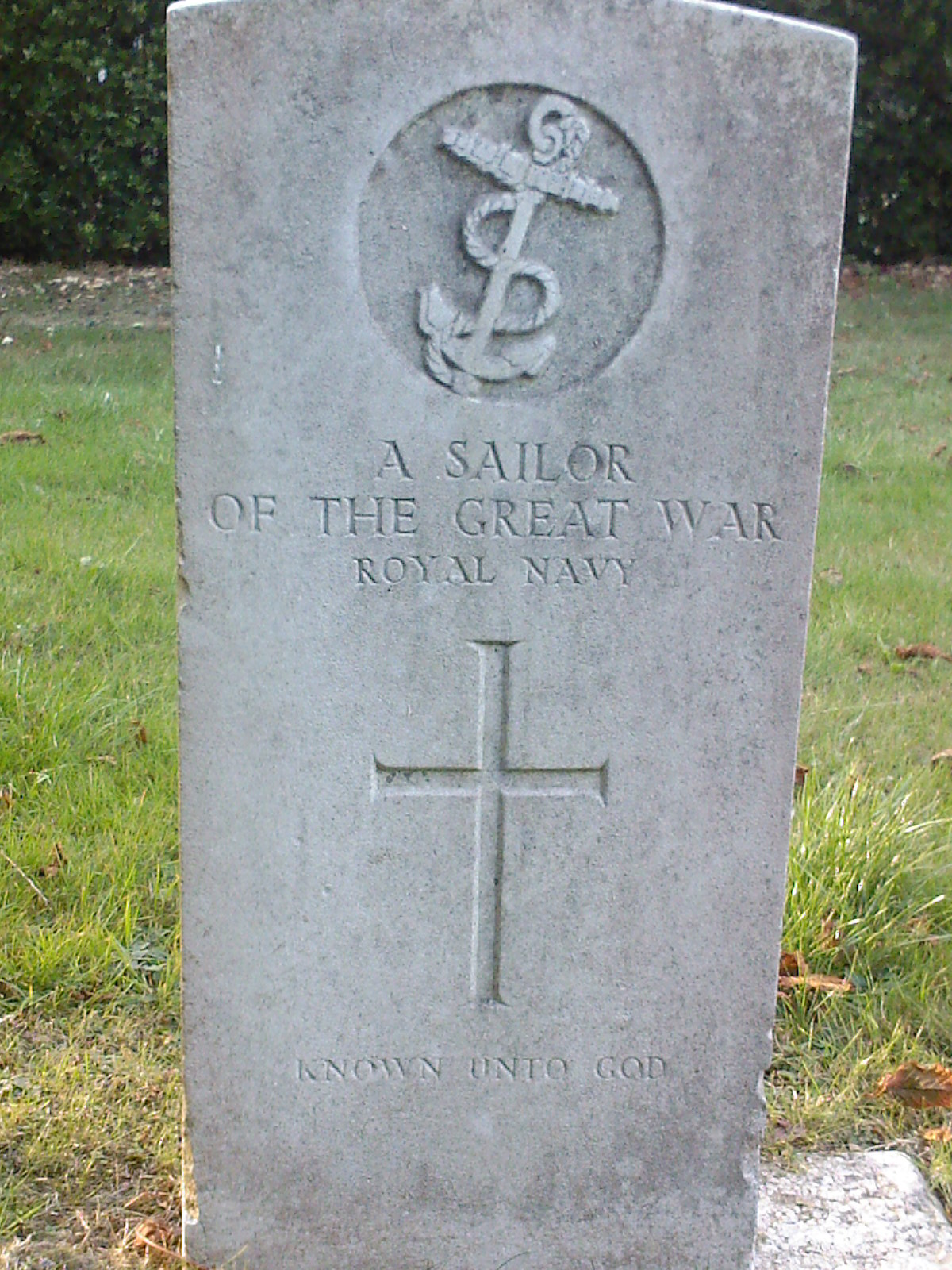
Gravestone of an Unknown Sailor of the Great War

In November 1925, a war memorial called The Deal Cross of Sacrifice was unveiled by Field Marshal Edmund Allenby, 1st Viscount Allenby, one of the Great War's most prestigious and controversial British commanders, who was also Captain of Deal Castle at that time.

The ceremony was very well-attended, and included two lieutenant generals, a colonel who was also the holder of the Victoria Cross, a major, Deal's mayor, the town serjeant bearing the ceremonial mace, councillors, aldermen, priests from three different churches and denominations, Walmer's Council, representatives from the International Committee of the Red Cross, St. John Ambulance, the British Legion, a large number of war veterans from the Volunteers Old Comrades' Association, and a Guard of Honour from the Royal Marines, who also provided a party of buglers.

The ceremony, as reported in the Saturday 14 November 1925 edition of The Deal, Walmer, and Sandwich Mercury newspaper, included the full text of his speech, reproduced here below:

This cross of sacrifice which I have been privileged to unveil today is a visible symbol of what is invisible, of that which we carry in our hearts – the memory of, and the gratitude to, those who suffered, fought, and died for us – fought and endured, and that [what] is even more admirable than fighting and endurance. No one except those that fought alongside those who memories are perpetuated here can have the least idea of what their endurance was, the awful suffering that our men went through, in cold, in heat, in drought, in wet and mud, in desert, in every sort of climate, every sort of horrible experience. No one could have carried through with it unless it was well known that they were remembered, that they were in the hearts of their countrymen and of their friends at home, and that did carry them through.

Now, they have their reward.

It struck me this morning, when the storm calmed down, the wind and the rain dropped so that we now have a calm day, that it is typical of what those men went through. they passed through storm into calm – "The worst turns to best, the bleak months end, the elements rage, and vaunting breezes that rave shall dwindle, shall change, shall become first peace out of pain, then light."

[Allenby was quoting Robert Browning's poem "Prospice", here...]

And those who have died for us have now entered into the light of heaven, and even as they stepped into heaven, the light shone, the full glory of heaven shone into their unblinking eyes, and they passed into the presence of God – Gentlemen: unafraid, conscious of their work finished, conscious that they had earned the reward which is now theirs. They are now in the light, and through the doors of heaven there is a gleam that comes through to us. We know that the light is there: we know that we have their example before us, and that gleam that we can see through the doors of heaven is a beacon light that will guide our steps for ever along the road of high endeavour."

== 1940–1945 ==
=== Notable naval interments from WW2 and the Battle of Dunkirk (1940) ===
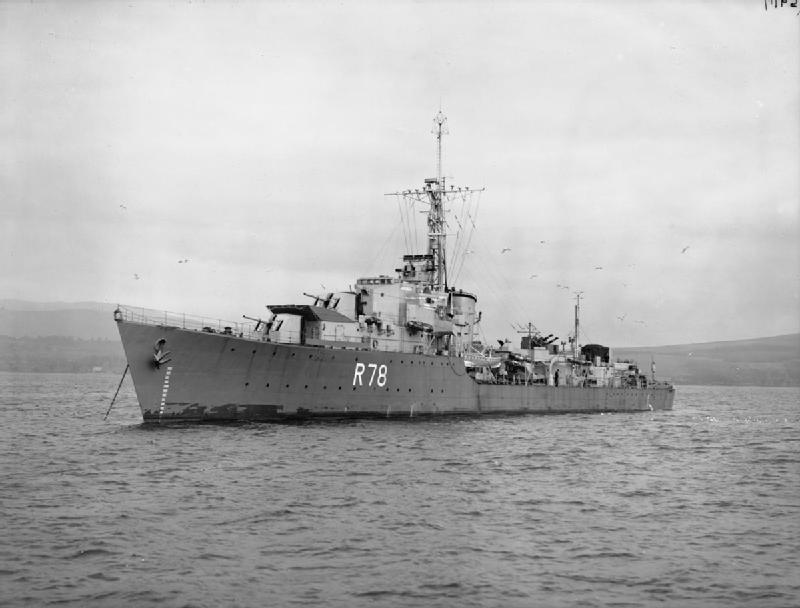
W-class British destroyer HMS Wessex

British evacuation from the beaches of Dunkirk

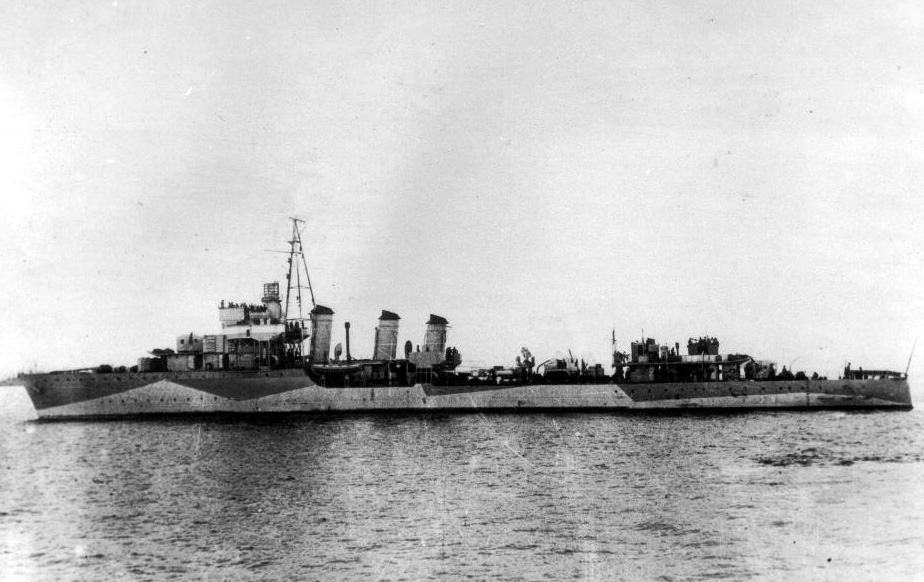
Polish Navy Wicher-class destroyer ORP Burza

There had been no military burials for a generation by the outbreak of World War II, and the need to bury new casualties from the British Expeditionary Force and from action in the English Channel meant the establishment of a new dedicated section in the far northern corner of the cemetery grounds. Notable burials include:

1. Chief Petty Officer William Eden, service number P/K 5943, from the naval shore base of HMS Fervent (which encompassed part of Ramsgate Harbour), who died on 27 September 1939, age and cause of death unknown.
2. Stoker 1st Class William Caisley from the W-class destroyer HMS Wessex. His ship had left Dover on 24 May 1940 with three other warships, the V-class HMS Vimiera, the W-class HMS Wolfhound and the Polish Navy Wicher-class destroyer ORP Burza. The ships had orders to attack German troop formations heading towards Calais, but the Wessex was in her turn attacked by Stuka dive bombers, resulting in the ship sinking and survivors being rescued by the Vimiera, which was in turn heavily damaged and forced to withdraw. Stoker Caisley died the next day, presumably of wounds.
3. Able Seaman William Edward Gibbs, who served on board the Royal Navy W-class destroyer HMS Windsor. His ship was part of the 9th Destroyer Flotilla based at Dover, and was taking part in the developing Dunkirk evacuation, the Windsor undertaking patrol and escort duties for some of the ships evacuating allied soldiers from the beaches. On 28 May 1940, his ship came under a coordinated and sustained aerial attack which resulted in the death of himself and 29 of his crew-mates. Despite this, the Windsor, still suffering significant battle damage, returned to Dunkirk and had rescued nearly four thousand troops from the beaches by the culmination of Operation Dynamo.
4. Leading Seaman Stanley George Bone, from the G-class destroyer HMS Greyhound, who died on 31 May 1940. His ship was carrying over 500 troops from the beaches of Dunkirk when it was attacked, resulting in several deaths, his included. The destroyer was badly damaged and had to be taken in tow by the Polish Grom-class destroyer ORP Błyskawica and tugs, and returned to England.

=== Notable Allied interments from the Battle of Britain (1940) ===
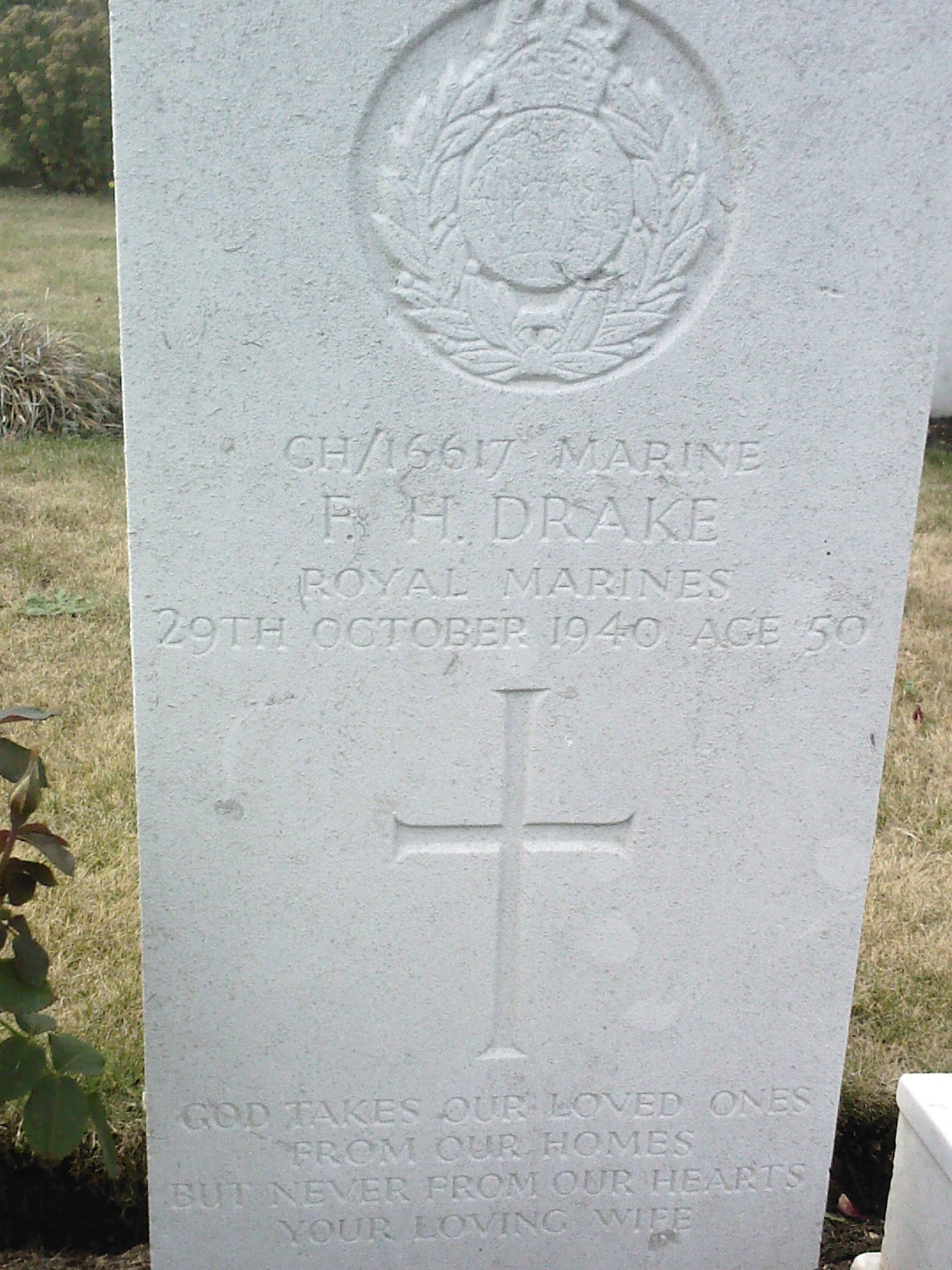
Grave of Marine Frederick Henry Drake

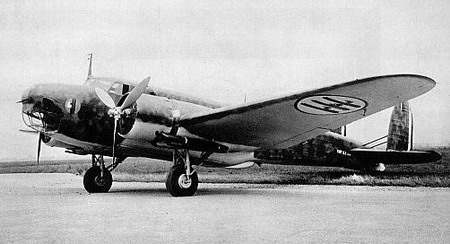
Italian Fiat BR.20 Medium Bomber from the Corpo Aereo Italiano

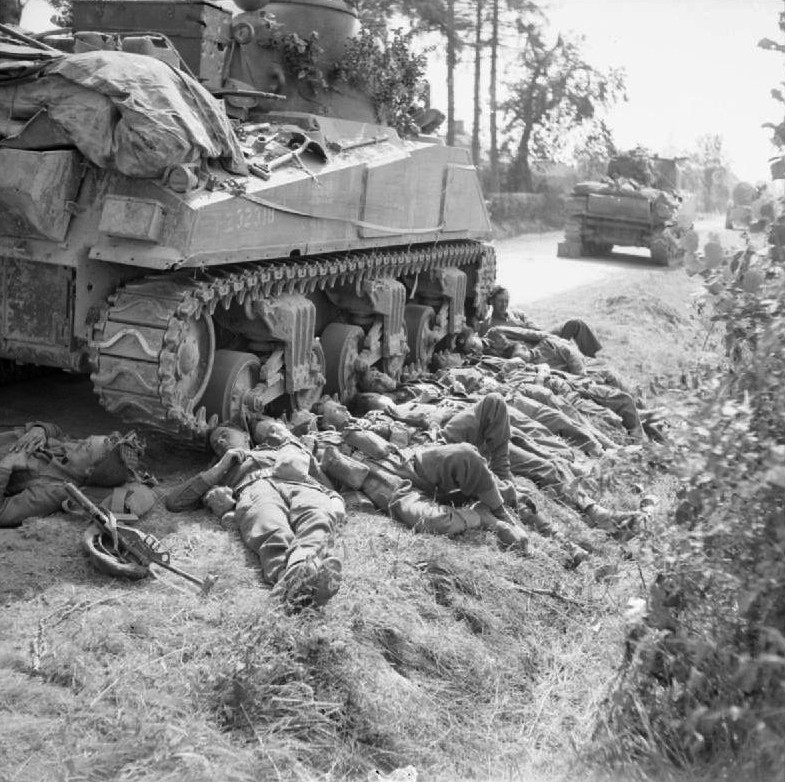
Men of the King's Shropshire Light Infantry.

Wing Roundel on fascist-era Regia Aeronautica's aircraft

On 29 October 1940, the Royal Marines Barracks in Deal was attacked from the air.

Army Stations 29 October 1940, Deal: At 1640 hours, three HE bombs were dropped in the barracks, the casualties being 1 Officer and 7 other ranks killed, 6 Officers and 6 other ranks wounded.

Historian David Collyer claims that the bombers were actually not from the Luftwaffe;

The bombs fell in Cornwall Road, Cemetery Road, and near the railway bridge in Telegraph Road. My uncle Leslie can remember seeing an Italian aircraft flying by after dropping a bomb in front of the Officers' Mess at the RM depot

This would indicate that the attackers were from the Italian Corpo Aereo Italiano equipped with Fiat BR.20 bombers: 29 October 1940 saw a major operation by the Italian Air Corps against Ramsgate, some eleven miles from Deal, and the bombers, painted a green and bright blue and flying in perfect wingtip formation, were accompanied by a Messerschmitt Bf 109 fighter escort.

Six of the eight casualties were buried side by side, symbolically, in the Hamilton Road Cemetery, in the new Plot C area of the cemetery which already had a number of recent interments by the end of 1940. The casualties were:

1. Second Lieutenant Robert Prynne Nelson, B.A. (Cambridge), aged 28, from the Royal Marines Siege Regiment. He was the son of Robert and Mary Susanna Nelson, of Harpenden, Hertfordshire. Nelson had been a first-class cricketer who played for Middlesex and Northamptonshire in the seasons 1931 to 1939. He is buried in Plot C. Block 8. Grave 4750. His gravestone bears the inscription:
  A Lover of cricket/He maintained in his life/The spirit of the game
  Lieutenant Nelson was remembered fondly:
  I do remember the few friends who were killed. Stephenson was a bright head boy of St John's Leatherhead, the son of Mr Brearly who lived opposite us and the other was Robert Nelson who lived in Harpenden and was captain of Northampton Cricket and he used to give me batting practice. He was a Royal Marine, stationed at Deal where I was and he was struck by a piece of shrapnel. I sketched his gravestone to send home to his parents. I remember him along with the others every November 11.
2. Marine George Frederick Lewis, a veteran soldier of World War I, aged 48, service number CH/16313. No family details are given. He is buried in Plot C. Block 8. Grave 4751.
3. Marine David Girling, aged 48, service number PLY/15078, Son of David and Caroline Girling; husband of Ethel Alice Girling, of Ewhurst, Surrey. He is buried in Plot C. Block 8. Grave 4752.
4. Marine Frederick Henry Drake, aged 50, service number CH/16617, son of Son of Thomas and Elizabeth Drake; husband of Christina Ann Drake, of Walmer, Deal. He is buried in Plot C. Block 8. Grave 4753. His gravestone bears an inscription:
  God takes our loved ones/From our homes/But never from our hearts/Your loving wife
5. Bugler Henry James Clemenson, aged 26, service number PO/X 625, son of George Charles and Caroline Margaret Clemenson, of Gosport, Hampshire. He is buried in Plot C. Block 8. Grave 4754.
6. Private Frederick John Clifford Drewery, age unknown, service number 4038695, from the King's Shropshire Light Infantry (7th Battalion). No family details are given. He is buried in Plot C. Block 8. Grave 4755.

It is to be noticed that Private Drewery was a long way from his unit when he died and there is currently no information on why he was at the Barracks that day. However, his burial plot position indicated that he was a probably a casualty of the events that day.

Right next to these casualties of an Italian air raid, three German Luftwaffe air crew from a Dornier bomber are interred.

=== Notable Axis interments from the Battle of Britain (1940) ===
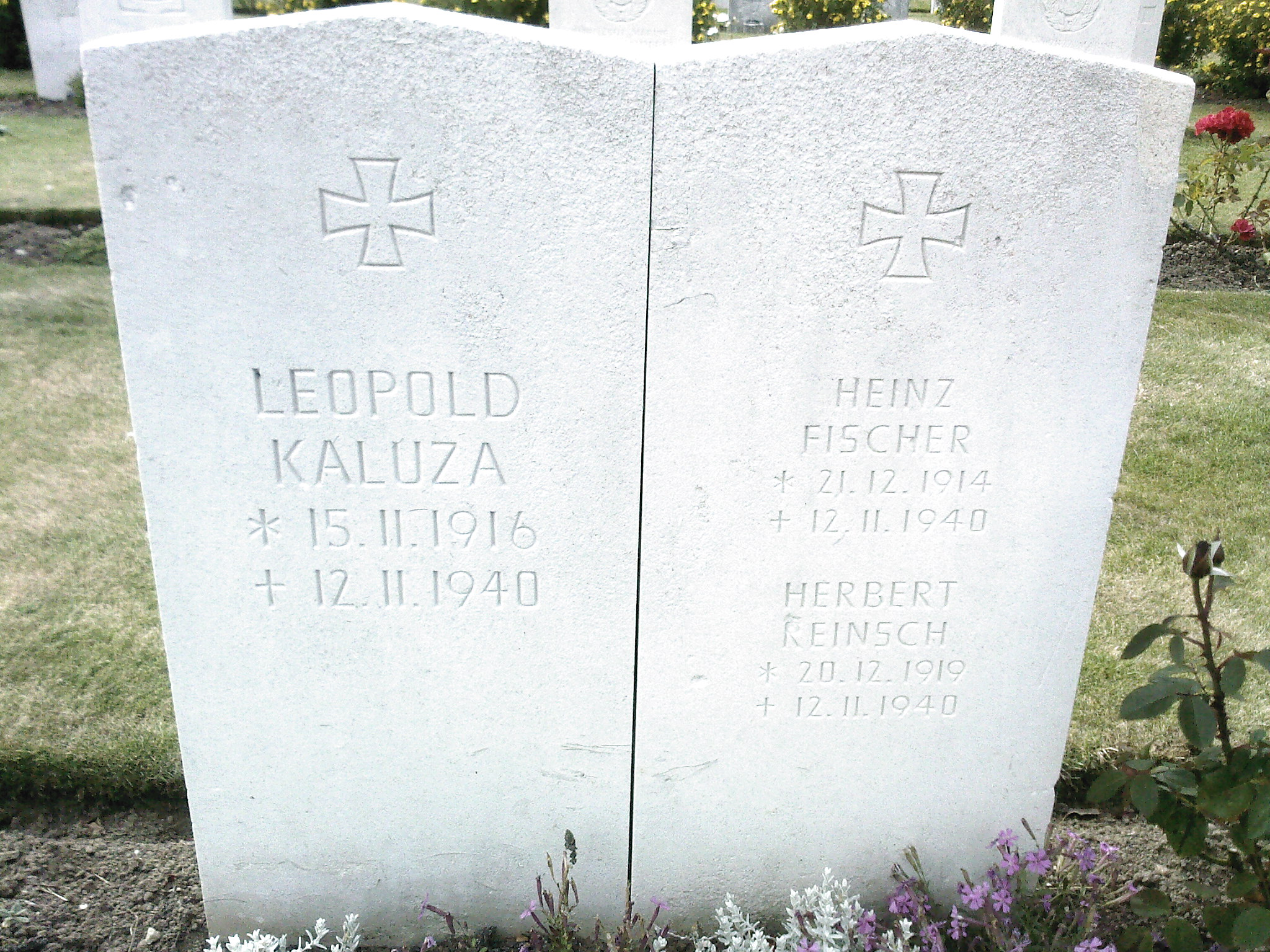
A photo of the graves of Leopold Kaluza, Herbert Reinsch, and Heinz Fischer

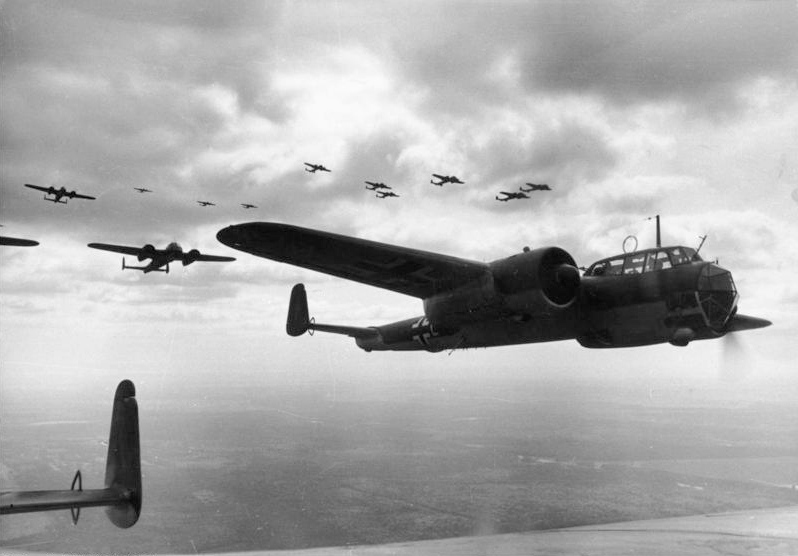
A flight of Dornier D0 17s

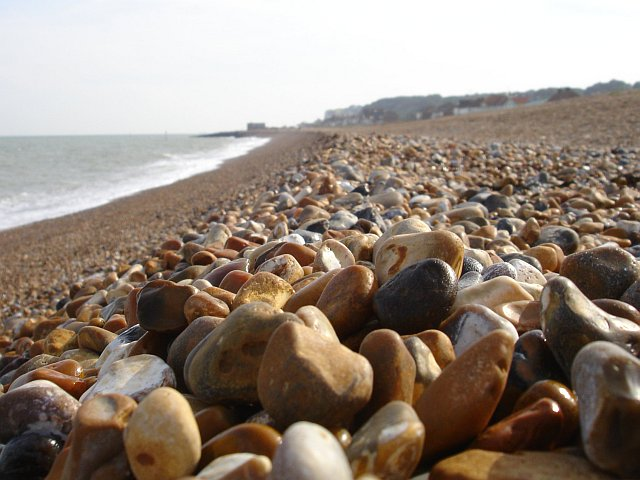
Kingsdown beach, where the remains of the crew were washed up. By Penny Mayes.

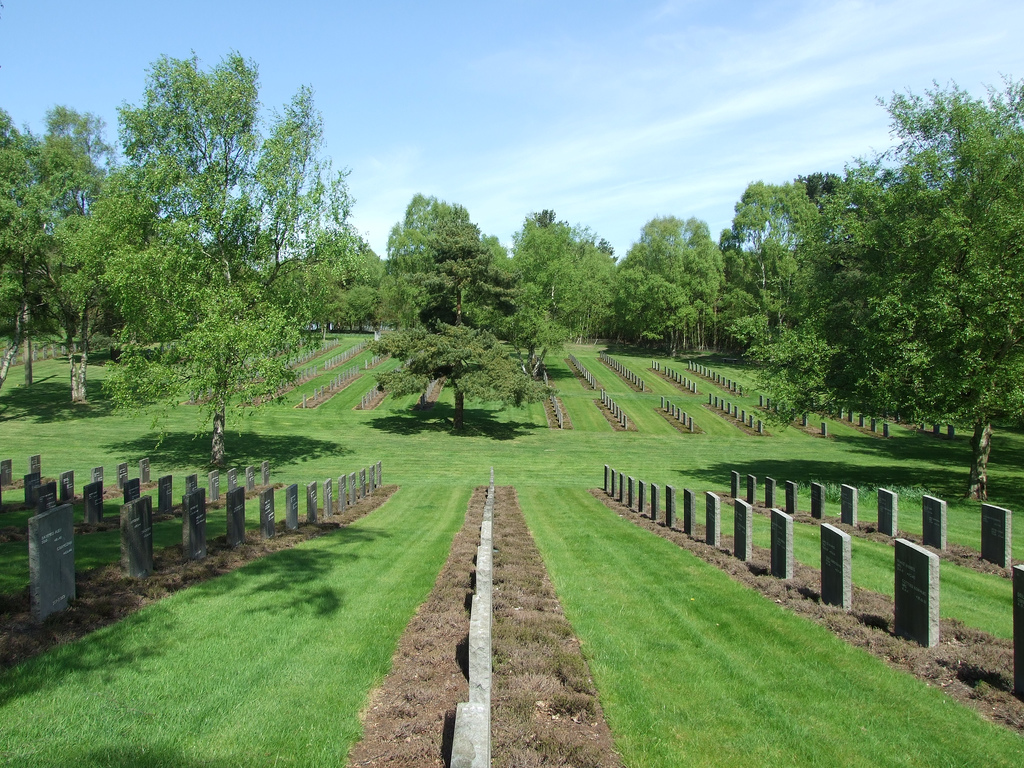
Cannock Chase German War Cemetery

In Plot C, Block 8 are the graves of three of a four-man Luftwaffe bomber crew whose aircraft, a Dornier Do 17, 3495 U5+DM from Kampfgeschwader 4, a type of plane sometimes referred to as the Fliegender Bleistift (German: "flying pencil"), had crashed into the sea at 20:40 hours on 9 November 1940, of unknown causes, off the coast of Kingsdown, Kent. Historian David Collyer states that their bodies were washed up on the beach nearby, although the circumstances of their burial indicate that only body parts were found for two of the crew, a third was found more or less intact, and the fourth's remains were, he claims, never recovered.

The crew were as follows:

a) Unteroffizier Leopold Kaluza, aged 23, from Klausberg (originally in Austria, now in Italy, in the South Tyrol area). (Service Number 58213/87)

b) Heinz Fischer, aged 25, from Dresden (Service Number 58213/42, no rank information available)

c) Unteroffizier Herbert Reinsch, aged 20, also from Dresden (Service Number 58213/28). Unlike all the other military graves in this cemetery, Heinz Fischer and Herbert Reinsch appear to be buried together in a single grave, and a separate headstone has been erected for Leopold Kaluza, which was erected right next to Fischer's and Reinsch's (see photograph, above). The December 2009 Newsletter from the Commonwealth War Graves Commission explains;

Adjoining headstones are also used when the remains of those buried are intermingled. Although individual sets of remains are known, the circumstances of death made it impossible to separate individuals. One of the most common uses of this form of commemoration are the graves of Second World War air crew.

d) Leutnant Günther Mollenhauer, aged 21, from the city of Sprottau in what was then the German Province of Silesia, and is now called Szprotawa, in Poland. His service number was -53576/636-1./Erg.K.Gr.2, and he was born on 17 October 1919.

Leutnant Mollenhauer, who, because of his rank was probably the pilot, was believed missing in action by some historians. However, the records of the Volksbund Deutsche Kriegsgräberfürsorge e. V. (VDK), Dover District Council, and the Deutsche Dienststelle (WASt) indicate that his body was found on the foreshore of the old Parish of Sholden, on the dunes between Sandown Castle, Kent and the Royal Cinque Ports Golf Club on 15 November 1940, three days after his comrades had been buried in the Hamilton Road Cemetery, and six days after the crash. Leutnant Mollenhauer was buried in Aylesham cemetery on 18 November, at grave reference "P.A.7.". Leutnant Mollenhauer, along with several other Germans who were buried in the Aylesham cemetery, was disinterred on 29 October 1962, and was re-buried in Cannock Chase German Military Cemetery. His grave is in Block: 1, Row 9, Grave 326.

The date of death of all four of the crew is wrongly listed on their graves as being the 12 and 15 November respectively. This is because the date used is the day they were found washed up on the beach.

Although the burials of three of the four crew-members in the cemetery are listed on the Commonwealth War Graves home page for Deal Cemetery, there are no individual cemetery reports for them as there are for the other foreign interments in the cemetery. The crew of 3495 U5+DM, having already been buried in an administered plot, were not moved, and form part of a very small group of Axis casualties that are still to be found in their original World War II era plots in the United Kingdom and Channel Islands. They are more unusual still, as the VDK specifically states that many of the burials in Cannock Chase consist of casualties from fallen combat aircraft and/or were washed ashore elsewhere, making this unmoved burial an even rarer event.

CWGC records indicate that there are less than one hundred remaining German interments in Kent, almost all of whom are buried near World War II RAF Bases; These include eighteen casualties at Margate cemetery which was close to RAF Manston, seventeen at Maidstone Cemetery which was located near RAF Detling & RAF West Malling, and fifty-nine at Hawkinge Cemetery, very close to RAF Hawkinge. Casualty details of German interments are not given in CWGC cemetery reports, however, and the online resources available on the VDK website concentrate around Cannock Chase and St. Peter Port, Guernsey, meaning that German casualty details are generally only obtainable through a direct request to the CWGC or its German counterpart, or by visiting and locating the interments directly.

Their bomber was never recovered, and still lies in the English channel as an unmarked war grave. However, the East Kent Mercury newspaper (1 April 2010) has printed a story stating that part of a World War II German bomber – apparently a tail fin and rudder – has been washed up on the beach at Kingsdown after a storm, and that local divers have also previously found a propeller and part of what they believed to be part of the undercarriage. The plane, states the paper, is "believed to be that of a Dornier Do 17..." The discovery has been officially reported to the Receiver of Wreck.

The paper reports that the group of local history enthusiasts who initially identified the plane plan further exploratory diving in the summer of 2010, so see whether the plane can be definitively identified. However, the Protection of Military Remains Act 1986 means that any such investigation will have to be on a "look but don't touch" basis as interference with the wreck is specifically forbidden by the Act. There is also the added complication that if it is likely that human remains will be found, no license to excavate will be issued by the Ministry of Defence. However, the removal of uncertainty about Leutnant Mollenhauer now makes it more likely that the Joint Casualty and Compassionate Centre (which is part of the Service Personnel and Veterans Agency) will, if asked, grant a license for an archaeological investigation, and the Receiver of Wreck has informed the Embassy of Germany in London of the discovery of wreckage from what may have been Leutnant Mollenhauer's Dornier.

BBC South East has also run a story on this, featuring a report by Peter Whittlesea, which links the remains specifically to 3495 U5+DM, though this has yet to be proven. The TV report is erroneous, listing the date of the crash as the 12th, and claiming that the body of the pilot was washed up and buried at the cemetery, whereas in fact Leutnant Mollenhauer was interred elsewhere. However, the report was broadcast before the Leutnant's fate was investigated and made apparent.

The report does however show a fascinating interview with an eye-witness, a Mr. Peter Kirling, who saw a German bomber crash in the area at the time.

It [the bomber] came across the Kingsdown Golf Links and disappeared over the edge of the cliff, and I ran to the edge of the cliff to see if I could see any more of it, but it had disappeared and I just assumed that it had fallen into the sea.

The TV report also shows footage of an aircraft's tail section, which at the time was being reserved from degradation by being kept submerged in a children's paddling pool of a local public house.

A second bomber, Dornier Do 17Z Werke nr. 1160, call sign 5K+AR, was discovered partially buried and largely intact in the nearby Goodwin Sands on 3 September 2010, and was raised successfully by a salvage company on 10 June 2013. One of the two crew killed is also buried, like Leutnant Mollenhauer, at Cannock Chase.

=== Other notable military and uniformed services casualties from WW2 ===
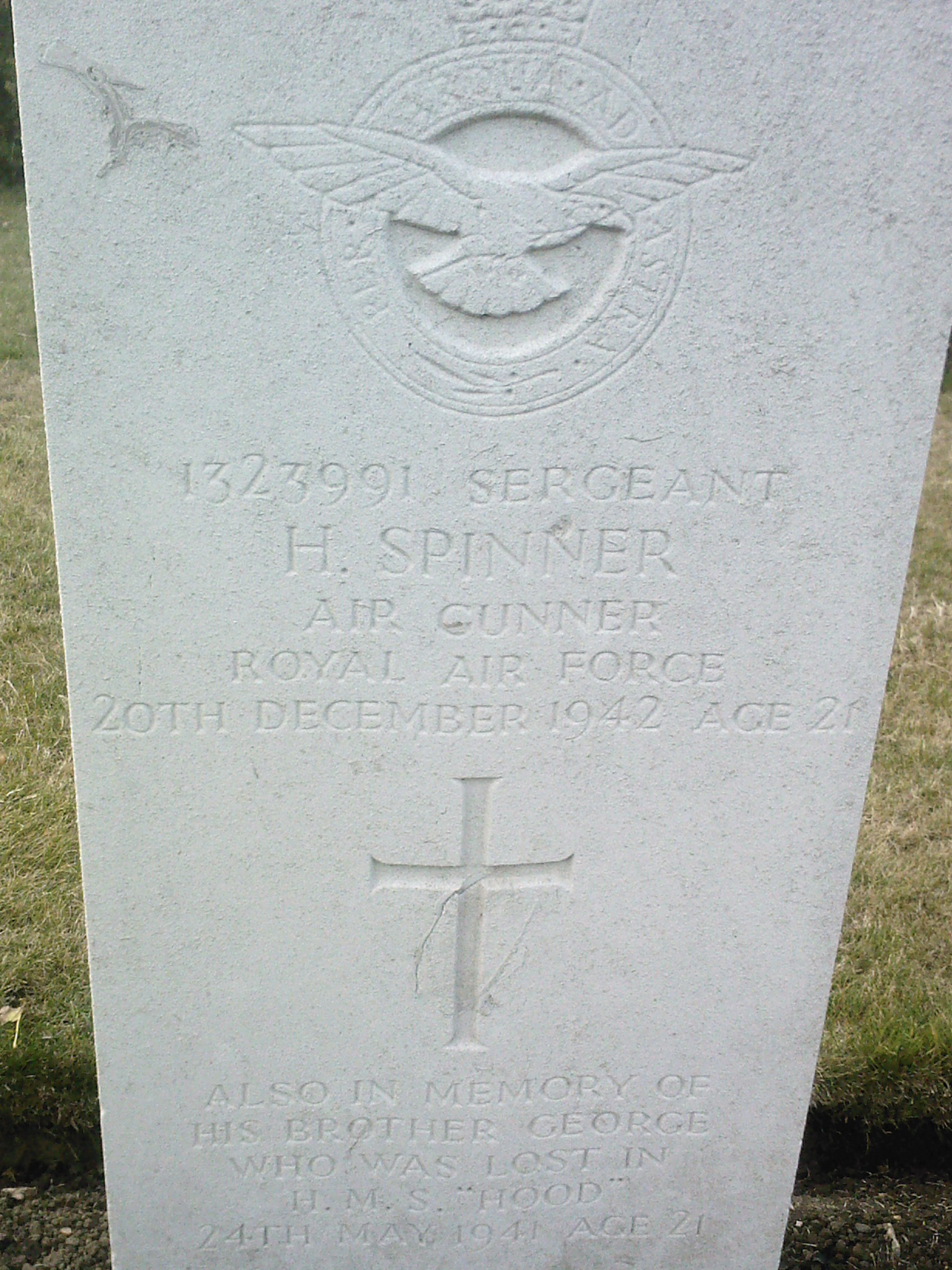
Headstone of Sergeant Spinner and his brother George, lost on HMS Hood.

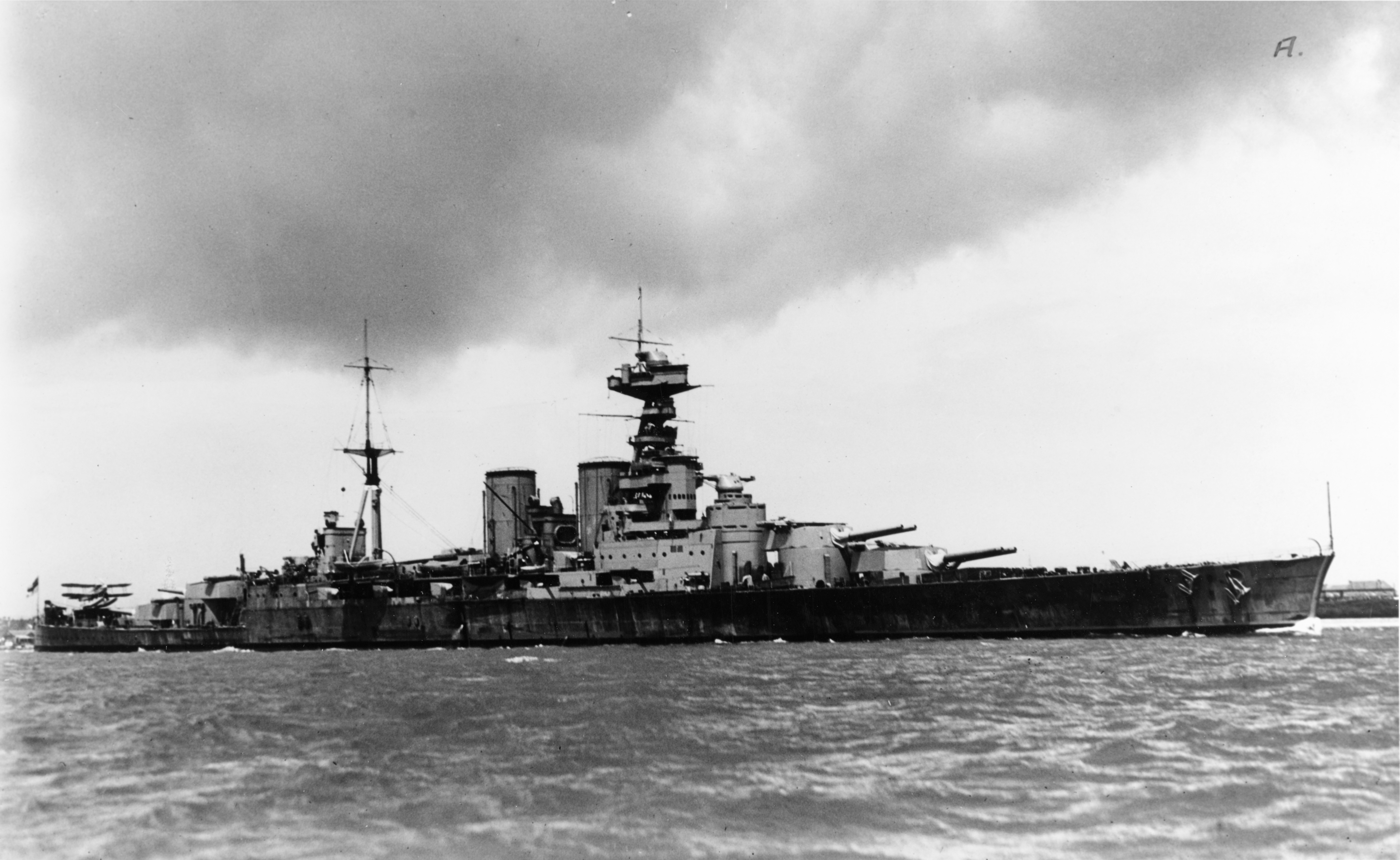
Battlecruiser HMS Hood

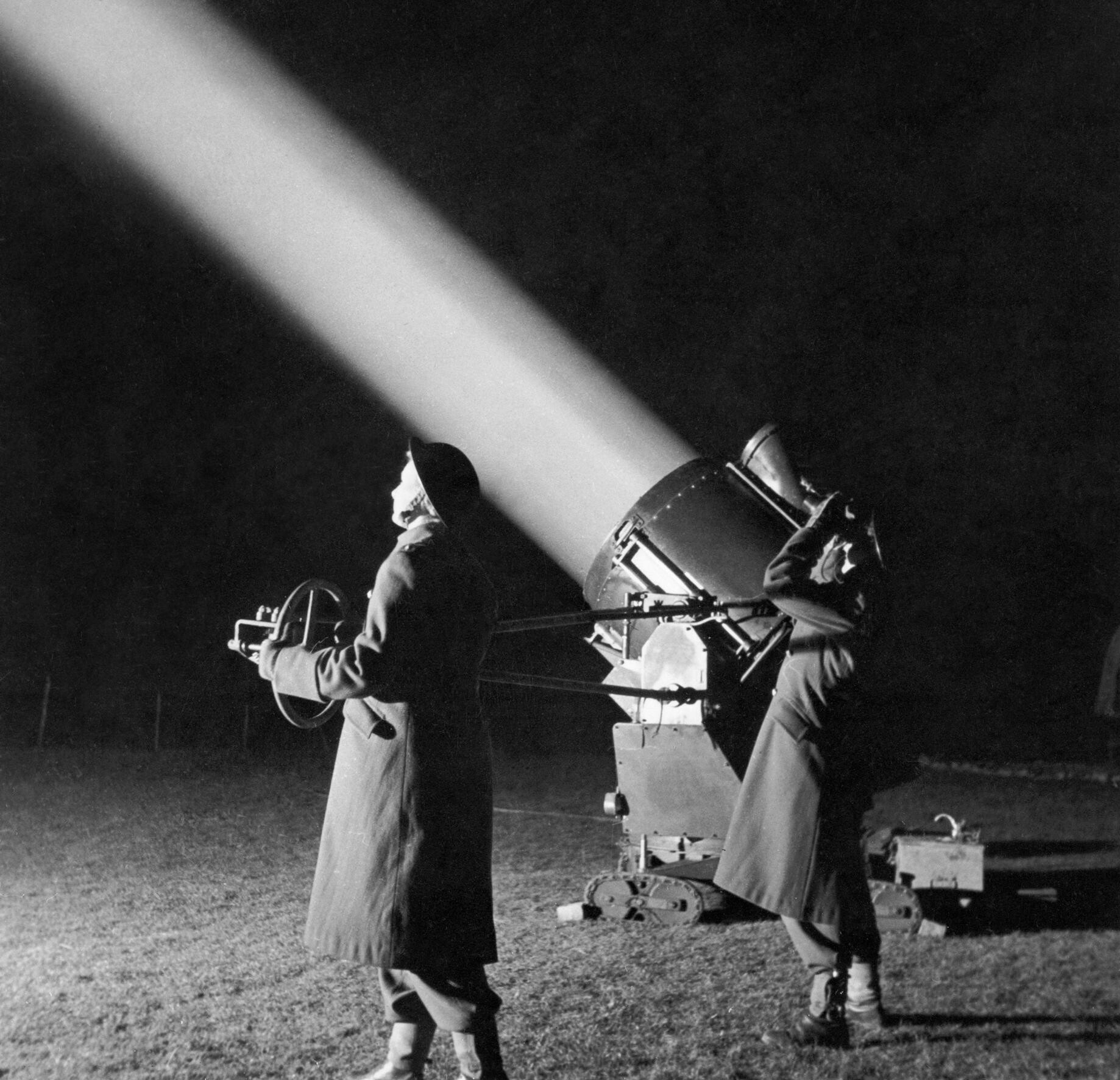
ATS Searchlight Unit

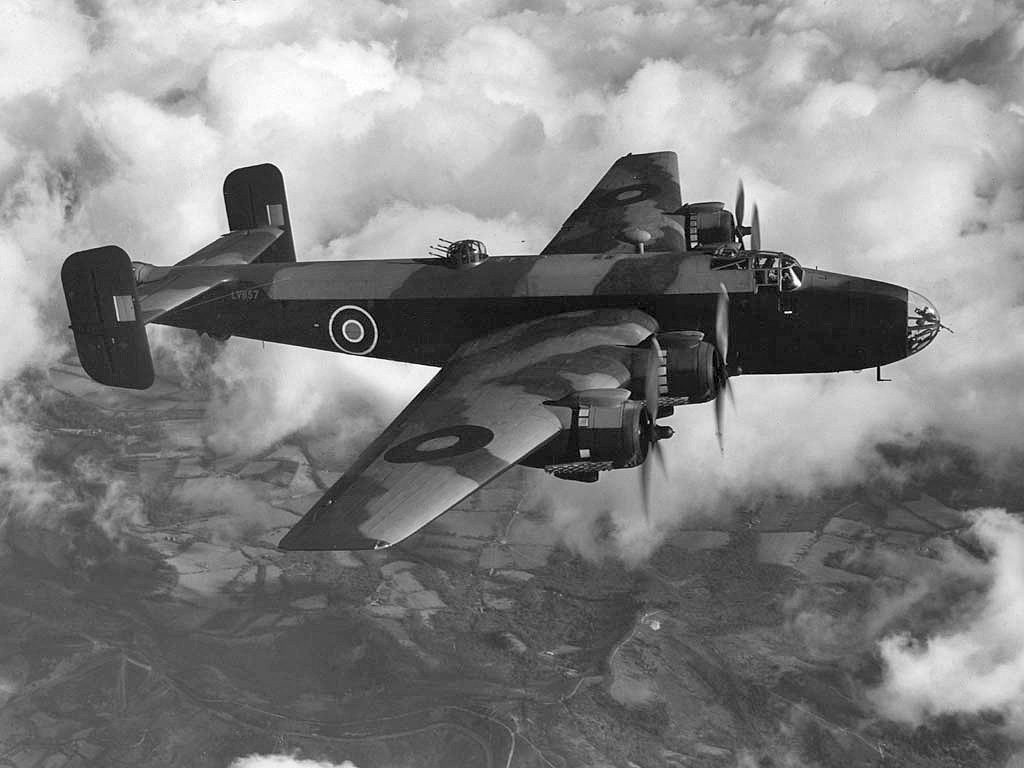
Halifax Bomber as used by 77 Squadron
1. The Grave of Corporal Robert James Firth Buysman from 501 Field Coy. Corps of Royal Engineers, service number 2077231, Son of Cornelius James Alexander Kelder Buysman and Kathleen Ellen Buysman, of Dulwich, London, who died aged just 21 on 29 July 1940. According to historian David Collyer, he died when he stepped on a land mine at Kingsdown.
2. The Grave of Percy Charles Deniss, a serving member of the Air Raid Precautions organisation (usually abbreviated to the ARP) Rescue service. Husband of Mignon Constance Denniss, of 157 Mill Road, Deal, he died at Park Lane in Deal on 31 August 1940. He was killed in a bombing raid at 13:00 that afternoon that saw six high explosive bombs kill six people, seriously injure another, and slightly injure a civilian. The raid destroyed two houses, seriously damaging over 50 other houses. Another ARP warden, a Mr. Shotbolt, had a lucky escape which saw him with holes in his equipment (including a bicycle and a gas mask) as a souvenir.
3. The Grave of Air gunner Henry Spinner, a Royal Air Force Volunteer Reserve Sergeant, from No. 77 Squadron RAF, who died on 20 December 1942. No. 77 Squadron RAF were at that time training to use the Handley Page Halifax bombers, based at RAF Elvington in Yorkshire and were not declared operational until the end of January 1943, so Air Gunner Spinner may have died in an air accident.
  His brother, George David Spinner, is also commemorated on the headstone, having died in the destruction of the Admiral-class battlecruiser, HMS Hood on 24 May 1941. A photograph of him is available on the HMS Hood Association Website.
  Both men were only 21 when they died.
4. The Grave of Private Ivy Berwick from the Auxiliary Territorial Service, daughter of Thomas Hayton Berwick and Ann Berwick, of Deal, who died aged 25 on 30 April 1942. Little else is known about her, but she appears to be the only female military casualty buried in the cemetery.
5. The grave of James Thomas Bonner, a serving member of the Home Guard, of 22 Beaconsfield Road in Deal, son of George Frederick Bonner and Elizabeth Edith Bonner, who died at the Southern Railway Goods Yard (now Deal Railway Station) on 8 May 1942. The bombing raid at 13:17 that day that also killed two children (see below) and buried several others at a nearby Roman Catholic Convent School. The raid seriously injured ten others, whilst 15 received minor injuries. It also blew the top floor off the Labour Exchange and the librarian working in the library opposite had a fortuitous escape according to an eye-witness report.
6. Police Constable Cecil George Constable, Son of Richard and Emily Constable, who died at 91 Canada Road (opposite the Royal Marines Barracks that was probably the intended target) on 18 May 1942, aged 41, in a hit and run raid at 6:20 am that morning. One old lady who was in bed at that time had a lucky escape when one Bomb failed to explode on contact and went straight through her bedroom walls, apparently coming to a halt on the steps in front of the Gas Company office.
7. The grave of Fireman Terence Albert Ilett, a National Fire Service volunteer who was awarded the Certificate for Gallantry. Son of Albert William and Mary Matilda Ilett, of 8 Flamstead Road, Charlton, London, he died at Dover Road, Walmer on 26 September 1944, aged just 19.

=== 1940 to 1945: Civilian War Graves ===
Map showing German invasion plans

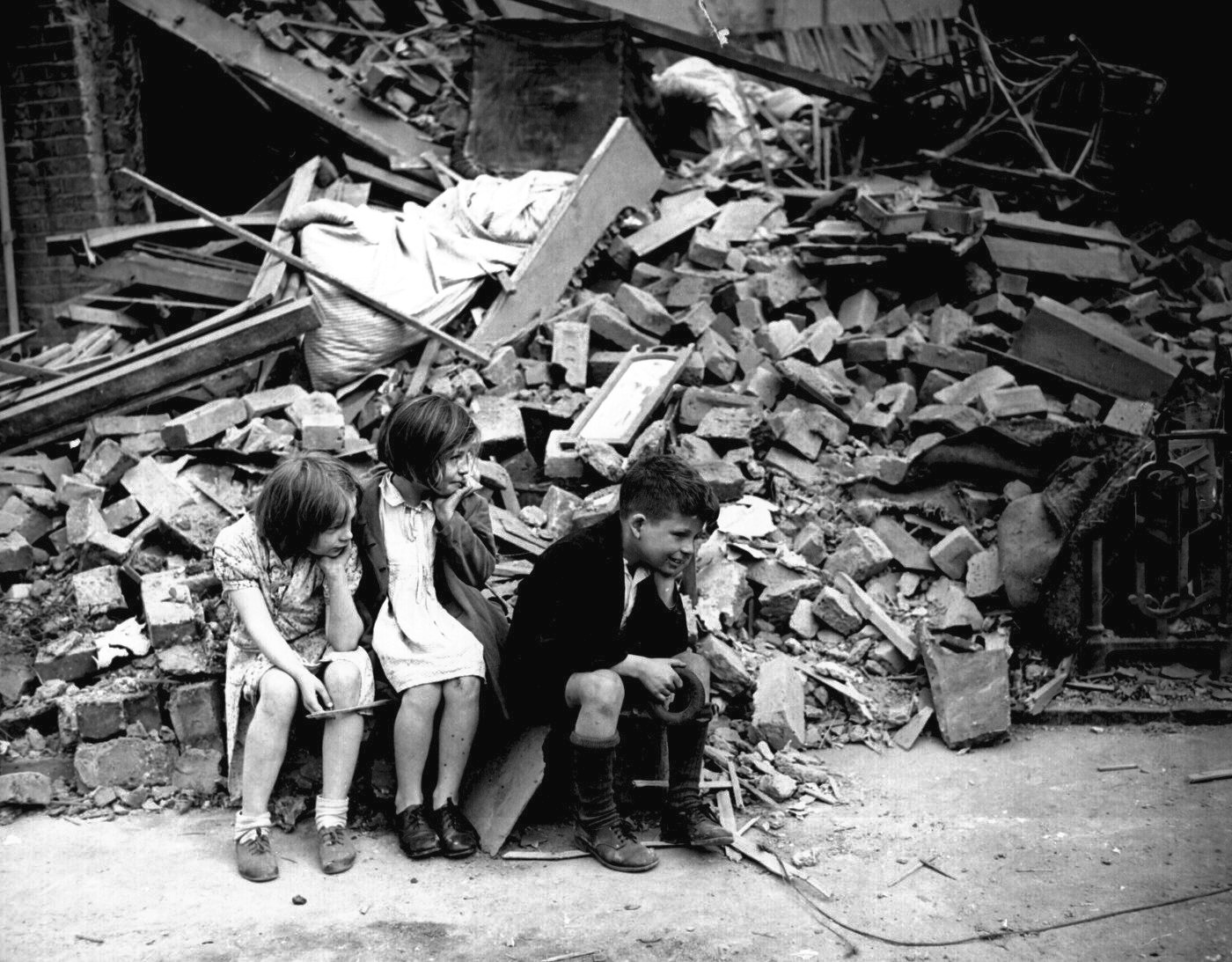
The aftermath of an air raid during the Blitz

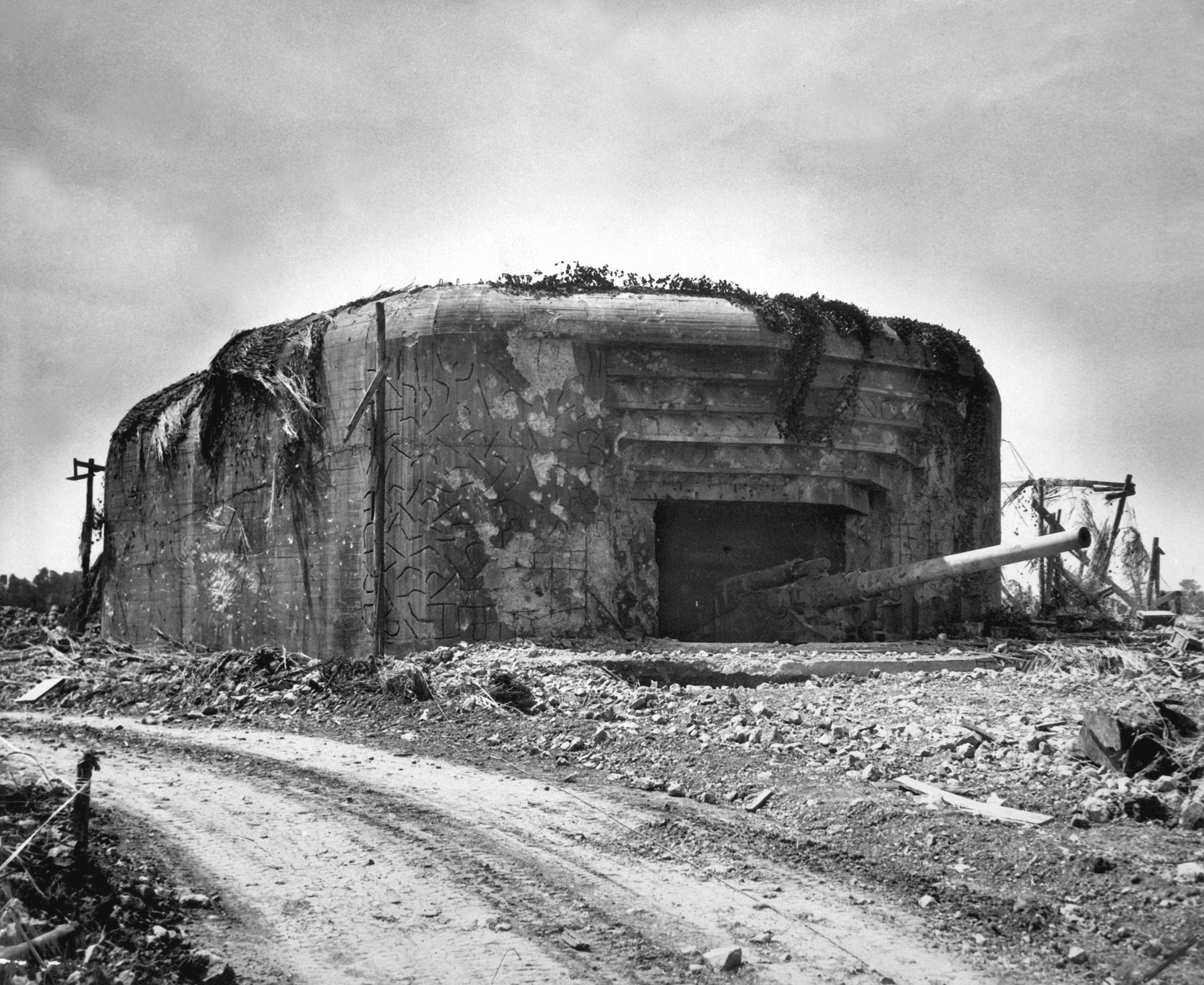
The German Crisbecq Battery

Deal became the target of German bombing raids and shelling from German coastal guns in occupied France from 1940 onwards as part of Operation Sea Lion, and its wide, gently sloping beaches were in the area of the proposed beach-head for the German 16th Army.

Raids and shelling targeted infrastructure such as the railways, military targets such as the Royal Marines Barracks, as well as attempting to break down civilian morale. Deal was also in the area where the Battle of Britain was being fought in the air, and civilian casualties were inevitable. Blast injury often meant that victims who survived the initial bombing died soon after from internal injuries with no external sign of trauma or injury. Those who survived both sometime suffered long-term problems caused by blast induced neurotrauma or barotrauma.

There were a number of major air raids or shelling attacks which caused clusters of fatalities on and around particular dates, and there were many more killed in these raids than are buried in the Hamilton Road cemetery, as some were buried in one of Deal or Walmer's other church graveyards. Husbands and wives died together, often their children too, and occasionally entire families who had the misfortune to be at home together when the bombs started to fall.

The inscriptions on the gravestones of civilian War Dead buried in the cemetery provide many unexpected insights into the lives of the people of Deal in the Second World War, the society they lived in, as well as their deaths.

==== 4 October 1940: Luftwaffe Air Raid on Deal ====
This bombing raid at 13:20 on a cold Friday afternoon resulted in severe damage to Union Road, Middle Street, destroyed the Governor's Quarters in Deal Castle, and caused the deaths of eight civilians including three children, the youngest of which was two years old.

An eyewitness account from a lady called Mary Osbourn recounts what happened when she, who was in the greengrocer's buying vegetables at the time, saw the bombers overhead:

I went straight across the road and up by Simmonds Jewellers and when I reached the corner of Middle Street, I decided to turn left through Boatman's Alley. I had just got to the top, and had turned the corner when the bombs fell on Middle Street. There was a terrible noise as they came raining down, with bricks flying everywhere, and I was blown off my feet. Mr. 'Flint' Roberts came running along and he stopped and asked if I was all right. I wasn't hurt, as the blast had gone over my head, but I was worried at losing the lettuce and tomatoes and had lost my coat. Mr. Roberts helped me to my feet and he then glanced down the little alleyway where one of the bombs had fallen. I wanted to have a look too, but he would not let me...

Seven of the eight casualties were buried in Hamilton Road cemetery.

1. Reginald George James Denton, aged just thirteen, who died at home at 21 Union Street along with his mother, May Lilian Denton, aged 32. Her husband and Reginald's father, R.G Denton, is not listed, probably because he was not at home when the attack took place. It is not known if any other members of the family survived.
2. Terrence Alfred Marsh, aged just six, who died at his home at 29 Union Street. He was the son of Son of Alfred and F. Marsh, who survived their son's death.
3. The Gisby Family, who lived at number 47 Middle Street but were killed at number 36. The husband, William George Gisby, Private of the Buffs (Royal East Kent Regiment), 2nd Battalion, died alongside his wife, Lucy Gisby (née Harris) and their two-year-old son William Gisby.
4. Julia Harris, aged 18, who lived, and died at home at 36 Middle Street. She was the daughter of P. and L. Harris.
  One contributor has provided the author with further information on the background of the Gisby and Harris family. The contributor states that Julia Harris' parents were Patrick and Lucy L. Harris, and that Lucy Gisby was actually Julia's older sister. This can be substantiated by cross-referencing the CWGC casualty details which lists P. and L. Harris as parents for both women.
  As the contributor states, this meant that in one attack, Mr and Mrs. P. and L. Harris lost their daughters Lucy and Julia, their grandson William, and their son-in-law, William Gisby. It is now clear that it was Private William Gisby that historian David Collyer is referring to when he states that the son-in-law's body was not found until Spring 1941, upon the roof of the (three-storey) Clarendon Hotel in Deal, according to the ARP. This, surprisingly, was not unremarkable, as the force of a Luftwaffe bomb exploding created a shock wave which travelled at supersonic speed, and there were many recorded incidents of civilian casualties in World War II being found in similar circumstances.
5. Harriett Bowles, aged 82, who lived, and died at home at 20 Union Street. She was the widow of Mr. J Bowles. She lived next door to Mrs. Denton and son Reginald, who were also killed. The CWGC site lists her date of death as the 7th, not the 6th as with the rest of the casualties, indicating perhaps that she was buried in the rubble of her house and not discovered until the next day. 20 Union Street – renamed Union Road – was never rebuilt.

It is difficult to imagine the sheer scale of this family tragedy, but the destruction that day can now been seen in present-day Deal. Middle Street, now part of the town's historic conservation area, only partially exists today. From the junction of King Street running northwards, it is mostly intact, and the last properties on Middle Street are numbered 61 and 52. The commercial properties next to these that border Middle Street and King Street however are given King Street addresses. Middle Street begins again to the south, bordered by the old Royal Cinema, but stops abruptly and a large central car park begins in an area which probably had in the region of a hundred individual dwellings prior to the War. Union Road was similarly truncated and, like Middle Street, is now partly a car park. The Middle Street Library, and the site of the Union Road Saturday Market are also built on that site.

==== 6 May 1942: Luftwaffe hit-and-run bombing raid on Deal Gas Works ====
April to June 1942 saw the Baedeker Blitz, a campaign by the Luftwaffe to retaliate for the RAF bombing of Lübeck in March of that year. Although it was Canterbury that was specifically targeted at the end of May and early June 1942, Deal was to see four air raids that caused significant loss of life during the Spring, Summer, and Autumn of this year.

On 6 May 1942, bombs were dropped from what one eyewitness, Peggy Oatridge, called Messerschmitt fighter-bombers, on Alfred Square, Park Lane, and Mill Road. It appears that at least one pilot missed his intended target, the Gas Works, and instead the bomb ricocheted off the side of a building, skidded across the road, and then detonated in front of a small parade of shops and a house on the corner of Alfred Square.

Seven people were killed, and they were all buried in the Hamilton Road cemetery. They were:

1. Hilda Joyce Finn. Aged 25, she was at home at 16 Alfred Square, when the bombs started falling. She was apparently rescued from the rubble by the ARP, but later died of her wounds at the local Victoria War Memorial Hospital in Deal. She was the daughter of Mr. and Mrs. Frederick George Finn.
2. John Arthur Frederick Finn. Aged just 8, he died at home at 16 Alfred Square in the same explosion that claimed the life of his older sister Hilda later that same day.
3. Mother and Daughter Nellie Middleton, aged 48, and Patricia Mary Middleton, aged 15, who both died at home at 17, Alfred Square. Nellie Middleton was the wife of Able Seaman James Middleton, Royal Navy.
4. There were further casualties at Park Lane, about 300 metres south of Alfred Square, where brother and sister James Christopher Milham, aged 64, and May Lillian Mary Milham, aged 60, both died at their home.
5. Sarah May Roots, aged 42, also died in the raid. She died at her home ("Holmleigh") in Park Lane in Deal, and was the daughter of A. C. Lewin, of Cloudesdale Road, Tooting, London and the wife of Stanley George Roots, who apparently survived.

==== 8 May 1942: First Attack on the Southern Railway's Goods Yard ====
Two days later, on 8 May, two children died in an air raid which killed a member of the Home Guard (see James Thomas Bonner, above). The children were at St Ethelbert's Convent School in Park Street, which was near the railway station, and were:

1. Michael Ryan, aged 11.
2. James Francis Rogan, aged 12.

A contemporary of theirs, Thelma Brown, remembers what happened:

On 8 May 1942 I was travelling by bus with my two oldest sisters to St. Ethelbert's Convent in Deal, the school was approximately three quarters of a mile from home. I was just six years old at the time and I remember the bus being stopped and we all had to go to the nearest air/raid shelter until the all-clear sounded. When it was considered safe we boarded the bus again and carried on to school — as we approached the school we were stopped again as a bomb had dropped on the playground — my eldest brother was already at school as he had gone by bicycle and we had no way of knowing if he was safe at that time, he was lucky has he had gone to the shelter but his cycle was badly damaged. Unfortunately two boys had gone back to collect their marbles from the playground and were killed (Michael Ryan and James Rogan) and seven others were seriously injured.

A different source cites the school as being called St Ethelburga's instead, and on balance of probability in terms of the number of references, this appears to be correct.

==== 11 August 1942: Second Luftwaffe attack raid on the Southern Railway's goods yard ====
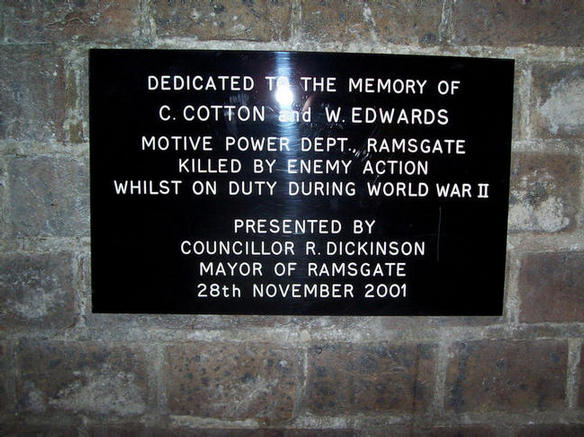

August continued to be probably the deadliest month of the War for Deal, as the Luftwaffe kept up their Hit and Run tactics. The evening of the 11th saw a particularly devastating raid, carried out by Luftwaffe fighter-bombers which happened "without warning" according to the ARP Records, at seven minutes past six in the evening. The attack focussed on civilian and military infrastructure targets; Deal's Gas Works (the target of the previous unsuccessful raid on 6 August), the Southern Railway goods yard (attacked three days earlier), the local bus garage belonging to the East Kent Road Car Company, and some eighteen houses in College Road and Albert Road near the targets were destroyed, with another 300 being seriously damaged.

The casualties were as follows:

1. Edward John Toomey, who died aged just 16, on Tuesday 11 August 1942, at Albert Road which bisects the main railway line.
  Toomey was a "Police Messenger", analogous to that of Fire Guard Messengers, who were used by the A.R.P. at a time when radio or telephone methods of communication were uncertain or disrupted. Police Messengers were a uniformed service made up in many cases of children up to the age of 18, who were used to relay information between policeman, special constables, and to act as runners "in case of air raids, invasions, or emergencies," in the words of one ex-messenger, William Rorison Gray.
  Edward Toomey is also listed as having been a member of the newly established Air Training Corps. The organisation was designed at that time to prepare cadets for entry into the RAF, and for those adolescents old enough to join, duties could include loading ammunition, filling sandbags, even in some cases handling aircraft. ATC Cadets were often sent to "Camp", which usually meant one or two weeks' service at an operation RAF base where they sometimes helped serving personnel with their work.
2. Edith Grace Burley (née Higgins), aged 51. She died at home at 64 College Road, and was the daughter of Edward and Emily Higgins, of 13 College Road, She was survived by her husband, Walter John Burley, but it is not known whether they had any children.
3. Edith's brother, Percy Higgens, aged 46, who also lived at 64 College Road. He is listed as having died at College Road, though the exact location is not given.
  According to contemporary reports, a bomb fell next to Swaffield's Laundry, completely destroying number 66 and 68 College Road, and severely damaging number 64, where Mr. Higgins lived. A photograph showing College Road after this attack shows an ARP Rescue Squad climbing over a large pile of bricks that once were two semi-detached houses, vainly looking for survivors. It is very likely therefore that Both Edith and Percy were at home when it happened.
4. Emma Cavell, aged 77, who lived at 178, the High Street in Deal. She was the daughter of the late Edward Brooksby Cavell, and died at Albert Road. Normally, the casualty details specifies a house number if the death took place at an identifiable address, so it is possible that Emma Cavell was unfortunate enough to be walking along Albert Road at the time.
5. Charles James Cotton, aged 59, husband of Matilda Cotton, of 1 Bush Avenue, Ramsgate. Mr Cotton appears to have been visiting Deal that day and was unfortunate enough to be in the Albert Road or College Road area at the time. The circumstances of his death, as well as those of Emma Cavell, indicates that either the raid was a surprise and the air raid sirens did not go off in time to allow them to get to a public shelter, or they did not sound at all. Like Hilda Finn, he was probably rescued by the ARP who took him by ambulance to the Victoria War Memorial hospital in Deal, where he later died.
  An anonymous contributor has recently indicated to this article's author that Charles Cotton was the contributor's great grandfather, was a steam locomotive driver, and was indeed "killed in a bombing raid while he was driving the Engine." At Ramsgate Railway station, there is a plaque, laid in 2001, which commemorates a C. Cotton and a W. Edwards as being "killed by enemy action", but it does not say where this happened, or the first names. However, it seems to be evidence of the above.
  Further documentary confirmation is probably required, but this evidence would however explain Mr Cotton's presence in Deal, and further suggest that one of the bombs that hit Albert Road (which bisects the railway line through Deal) could have killed Mr Cotton.
6. Florence Goodban, aged 29, who lived at 88 College Road, and died at College Road, though the records do not say exactly where. She was the daughter of Mrs. V. Atkinson, and Florence was married to Mr. Edward Charles Goodban.
7. Charlotte Pittock, aged 35, whose father is listed as living at 1, Finsbury Road, Ramsgate. Which road lies just off the modern A255 in Ramsgate, and most of the houses there appear to date from the 19th and early 20th century.
  Her father lived less than a mile from Charles Cotton (see above), though there is no direct evidence that the two families knew each other. However, circumstantially, it is quite a coincidence that this is the only recorded occasion in World War II Deal where two visitors from the same town died in the same air raid, in the same area of the town, and had male and female versions of the same name ("Charles" and "Charlotte").
  She was the daughter of Charles Cullen, and married to George Pittock, and lived at "The Oaks", College Road, in Deal. Again, the exact place of death is not listed, but the records state she died in the same road she lived in with her husband.
8. Florence Lucy Clara Redsull, aged 64, who lived at 66 College Road, and was married to Mr. Robert Redsull. Again, she is listed as having died at College Road, probably at home as her house was totally destroyed by the bomb.

==== 22 October 1942: Luftwaffe hit-and-run raid on Deal High Street ====
At 9 am on the morning of 22 October, the Luftwaffe hit non-strategic targets in a civilian area of Deal, specifically the High Street and College Road (for the second time in less than a week) causing great loss of life, as many people were out shopping. Fifteen people died that morning including eight children. One family even lost a mother and both of her very young children in what was one of the most horrific attacks in Deal's history.

Thirteen of them were subsequently buried in the Hamilton Road Cemetery.

The casualties were:

1. Edna Antcliff, aged 16. She was the daughter of Mrs. E. Marples (formerly Antcliff) and of the late Herbert Antcliff and lived at 79 Cavell Square, Mill Hill. She died in the High Street. Given this is over a mile away, it is likely Edna was out shopping when the attack happened.
2. William Albert Bransby, aged 59. of 92A High Street. Died in High Street.
3. Amy Agnes Bransby age unknown. (otherwise BRANSBY). of 92A High Street. Widow of Edwin W. Smith. Died in High Street. She is likely a relation of William Bransby, but nothing more is known apart from the fact they lived at the same address.
4. William Henry Brown aged 49. Husband of Ada Mary Brown, of 4 Westfield Cottages, Cannon Road. He died at the High Street, though his wife either survived or was elsewhere at the time of the attack.
5. Elsie Alice Burgess aged 26, and lived at 22, College Road, where she died. Daughter of Thomas R. and Bertha J. Cannon, of 10 Prince's Street (which is just off the High street at its northern end); wife of Richard Benjamin Burgess. Her husband apparently survived.
6. Kay Barbara Burgess aged 15 months; of 22 College Road. Daughter of Richard Benjamin Burgess, and of Elsie Alice Burgess. She died at home along with her mother.
7. Ean Richard Burgess aged 3, of 22 College Road, Deal, Kent. Son of Richard Benjamin Burgess, and of Elsie Alice Burgess (above). Injured 22 October 1942, at 22 College Road; died at Hurstwood Park War Emergency Hospital, Haywards Heath, some one hundred miles away from Deal, on 25 October. Tragically, Mr. Richard Burgess had now lost both of his young children as well as his wife.
  This hospital crops up several times in CWGC archives in the casualty detail of civilians and serving members of the armed forces. In each case, they had been injured elsewhere, and moved, often some considerable distance, to this unit. One reference states that it was a specialist neurosurgical unit.
8. Jane Elizabeth Burke aged 80, of 28 College Road, where she died. Daughter of the late William and Jane Wiltshire, of Portsmouth; widow of James Burke.
9. Raymond John Giles aged 14. Son of Arthur and Kate Gertrude Giles, of 7 Northway, Betteshanger Colliery. Died at High Street. David Collyer lists him as Raymond Files instead.
  Raymond was last thought to be seen in the basement of Gordon Blain's Greengrocer's shop in the High Street. The shop, and three others, were reduced to rubble, and many others were very badly damaged.
  His next door neighbour, Mary Osbourn, who nearly died in a 1940 attack on Middle Street (see above), and may well have been in the same greengrocers two years previously, recounted that Raymond's father asked his neighbours in Betteshanger for help to find his son. They, en masse, came into Deal, standing in the back of an old lorry, and dug away at the rubble of the shop until two o'Clock in the morning. Eyewitness accounts do not make it clear whether his body was ever found or not.
10. Kenneth Percival Moodie aged 13. Son of Frederick Percy Moodie, of 5 Forlands Estate, Telegraph Road. He died at the High Street, a mile or so away from his home.
11. Thelma Gwendoline Nicholls aged 14, who lived at 10 Frederick Road, Mill Hill. Daughter of the late Robert Thomas Nicholls, she died in the High Street.
12. Joyce Edith Hughes aged 14. Daughter of Leading Seaman Edward William Hughes, R.N., and May Elizabeth Hughes, of 127 Edward Terrace, Mill Hill. She died in the High Street.
13. Patricia Rebecca Rigden aged 15. Daughter of Mr. and Mrs. Ernest Edward Rigden, of 19 Mayers Road, Walmer. She also died in the High Street.
14. Ethel Jessie Mary Snelling aged 49. Daughter of J. W. Salmon, of Laburnham Cottage, Weeley Heath, Clacton-on-Sea; wife of John Edward Snelling, of Sunnycot, Godwyn Road in Deal. She died at 26 College Road.
15. Lucy Spinner aged 66. She was the daughter of David Markham, of Newport Pagnell, Buckinghamshire; wife of Charles Tigwell Spinner, of Walmer Place Lodge, Walmer. She died in the High Street.
  There is an unusual ending to this tragic day. One of the bombs that hit the High Street shattered the large stained glass window at the eastern end of the chancel of St. George the Martyr Church in Deal, which had been installed in 1867 by Dr. G.R. Carter. All that was left after the bombing was a single shard of glass that was incorporated into the new window. It bore a single word: "Hope".

==== 5 November 1942: Cannon Street ====
Situated so close to Deal's main railway line, Cannon Street was once again on the receiving end of imprecise Luftwaffe ordnance. One bomb demolished three houses next to each other and there were yet more casualties; three dead, one person seriously injured, and six people were slightly injured according to the ARP in raid that happened in the morning. The three dead buried here were:

1. Alfred Thomas Smith, aged 71, of 4 Cannon Street, Deal. He was the husband of Edith Ellen Smith, he died at home with his wife, Edith (see below).
2. Edith Ellen Smith, aged 64, she died at home along with her husband, Alfred.
3. Sarah Ann May Anderton, aged 22, of 2 Cannon Street. She was the daughter of David and Mary Oatridge, and the wife of Harry Anderton. She died at home, though her husband is not listed, either because he survived, or because he was not at home at the time.

==== 20 January 1944: The Roberts Street shelter attack ====
One of the worst attacks on civilians happened on 20 January 1944, when a civilian shelter and its immediate vicinity was hit by German shellfire from France, killing twelve, including a number of women and children.

The shell attack, which started at 5:00 am, hit the civilian street shelter which was being used by only women and children (apparently to allow the men to smoke in a separate shelter next door) in Robert Street in Deal at 5:30 am. An eye-witness at the time claimed that the blast of the explosion killed everyone in the first shelter without leaving a mark on their bodies, though the men, some of whom were their husbands, fathers, brothers and sons in the adjoining shelter escaped, apparently without a scratch. The event was not mentioned at all in the local newspaper, perhaps because of wartime restrictions on reporting, or perhaps because of the desire not to give the enemy any useful propaganda, or perhaps simply because the authorities did not wish to let the German gunners know where their shells had landed so that this information could be used to improve their fire-control. The truth will probably never be known.

The casualties included:

1. The Grave of Mrs. Zipporah Smith, who died, aged 30, at her home address on 20 January 1944. She is listed as being an A.R.P. Ambulance Attendant, and lived, and died, at 7A Robert Street in north Deal. Daughter of Mrs. S. McLeod (formerly Thirkettle), of 36 Barclay Street, Monkwearmouth, Sunderland, and of the late Thomas John Thirkettle.
  As an Ambulance Attendant, Mrs. Smith would have worked occasionally gruelling shifts, sometimes concurrently, and deal with a range of duties from evacuating the elderly and infirm from sites where an unexploded bomb was, transporting casualties to nearby Deal hospital, and dealing with injuries ranging from the minor scratch through to life-threatening injuries, sometimes in the most appalling circumstances imaginable
  Edith Myra Taylor, one ex-ARP Ambulance worker from Kent, remembered what it was like:
  One lunchtime Elsie and I were eating our sandwiches at a small infant's desk. There had been no air raid siren but we could hear a plane and thought it one of ours — suddenly we heard the loud swish of bombs falling and our building shook. The grills in the ceiling discharged a load of soot, covering our food and us. We saw that a bomb had fallen on Milburn Road opposite the depot so off we went. The road was full of potholes, flints and lumps of concrete; water was escaping everywhere from the mains, as well as gas, so people were warned not to smoke. A house had received a direct hit; neighbours thought both husband and wife were at work, but someone then said they thought she had gone indoors and was wearing a purple coat. After some time searching through the extensive rubble our rescue squad found the purple coat and hung it on the fence next to me. An unexploded bomb went off down the road and an air raid shelter came flying over the roof of the house. Eventually, with the help of her husband and a passing naval officer her body was located under the kitchen table.
  I waited while her remains were extracted and wrapped in two army blankets. We were not supposed to take bodies but to leave them for the mortuary ambulance; as this was occupied down in Medway Road with several casualties, I had to remove her. I remember looking back through the ambulance and seeing long brown wavy hair hanging over the edge of the stretcher. When I got to the mortuary, actually a row of garages at the back of the school in Green Street, I followed Roy Spenceley the mortician to regain my blankets, which we had strict instructions not to part with, as these were in short supply.
  I shall never forget the sight that met my eyes... As everything was stuck to the blankets, we could not retrieve them and had to make our excuses back at the depot. For a long time afterwards I have remembered how sick I felt and how I couldn't stop retching.
  Zipporah Smith was eventually a victim herself of one of the most bloody attacks in Deal in the entire war. Her husband, Ernest Smith, is not listed, either because he survived, or because he was not there at the time of the attack.
2. Mr. John Reed aged 31, of 9 Robert Street. Son of G. Reed, of 1 Bungalow, Deerson Farm, Preston, Canterbury. Mr Reed died at 9 Robert Street, which was later demolished.
3. Mr. William Richard Mockett aged 66, who lived and died at 1A Robert Street, Deal.
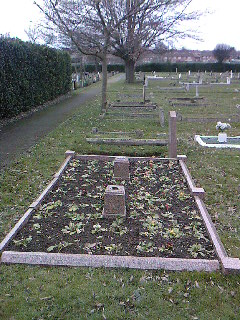
  The grave of Emma, Edith, and Margaretta Newing
4. Three members of the same family, who all lived at Faber Villa in Robert Street. They were Mrs. Emma Francis Newing (née Rice), who had married into the Newing family. Her sisters-in-law both died, their names being Edith Hilda Newing, and her older sister Margaretta Annie Newing. They were buried side by side in a large plot, which, unlike many of its contemporaries, remains very well-maintained. The inscription on their grave mentions each by name as well – very unusually – as a description of the circumstances in which they died.
  An entry in the personal section of the local newspaper, The Deal, Walmer and Sandwich Mercury, appeared several weeks afterwards, apparently placed by the remaining members of the Newing family, thanking everyone for their expressions of sympathy and support, without mentioning the circumstances in which Emma, Edith, and Margaretta died. Such was wartime.
  Faber Villa was damaged but repaired and still stands today, though the property next door was demolished, as were many others in the street which were never rebuilt. This, perhaps, stands as a metaphor for the lives affected by this incident.
5. A 28-year-old mother and her two young daughters. Gladys Clarice May Dunn died, as well as her 10-month-old infant, Joyce Phyllis Dunn, and her six-year-old sister, Barbara Lilian Joan Dunn as well. The family lived nearby in 25 Princes Street which extends directly into Robert Street. She was survived by her husband, Edward J. Dunn, though it is unclear what happened to him or if the couple had any other children, and the entry in the "deaths" section of the local newspaper the week afterwards does not specify.
6. Eliza Friend, 48, of 8 Robert Street, wife of Albert Edward Friend She is specifically listed as having died in the Robert Street Shelter, and was remembered in the Personal section of the local newspaper the week afterwards.

== 1946–1988: Zeebrugge remembered ==
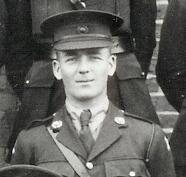
Lieutenant William E. Sillitoe.

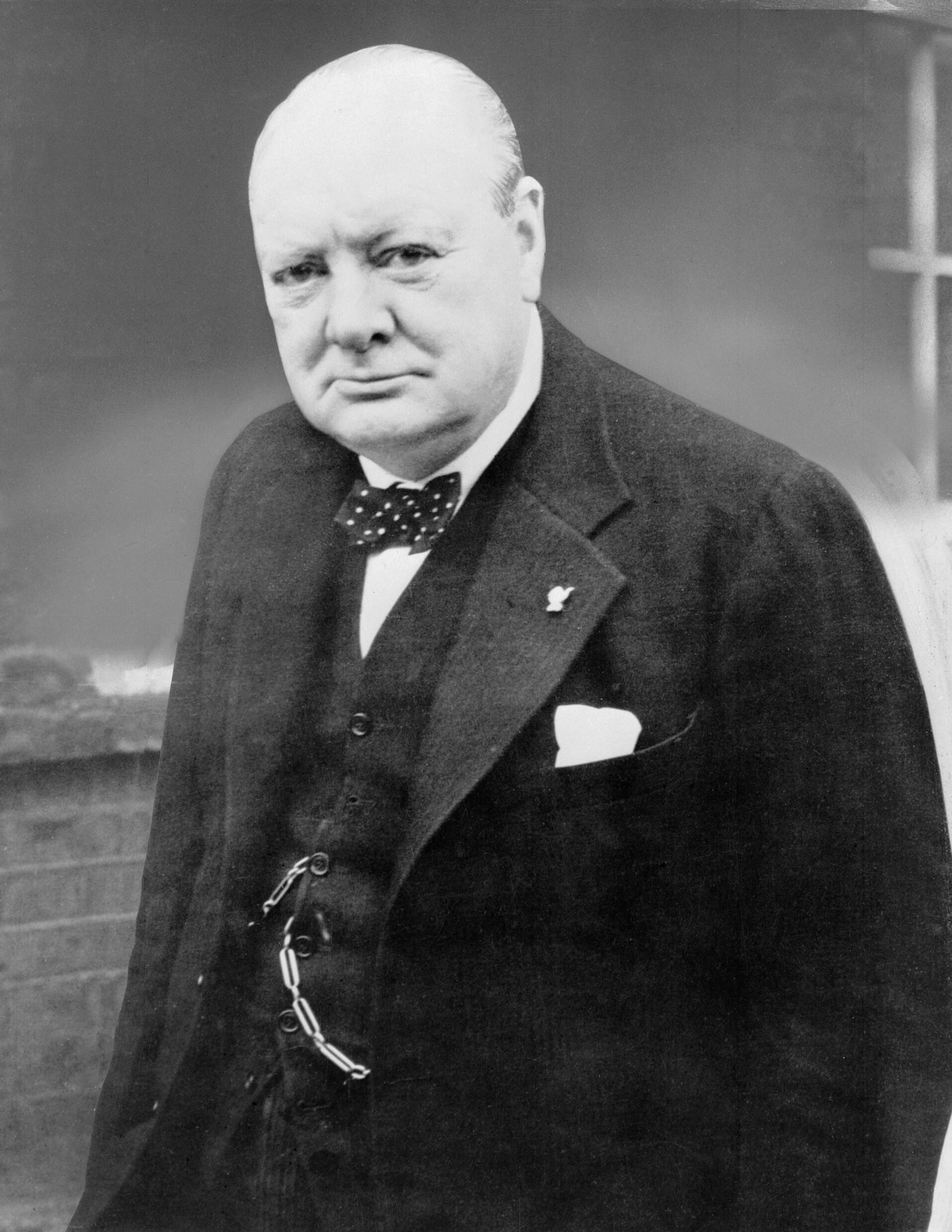
Sir Winston Churchill

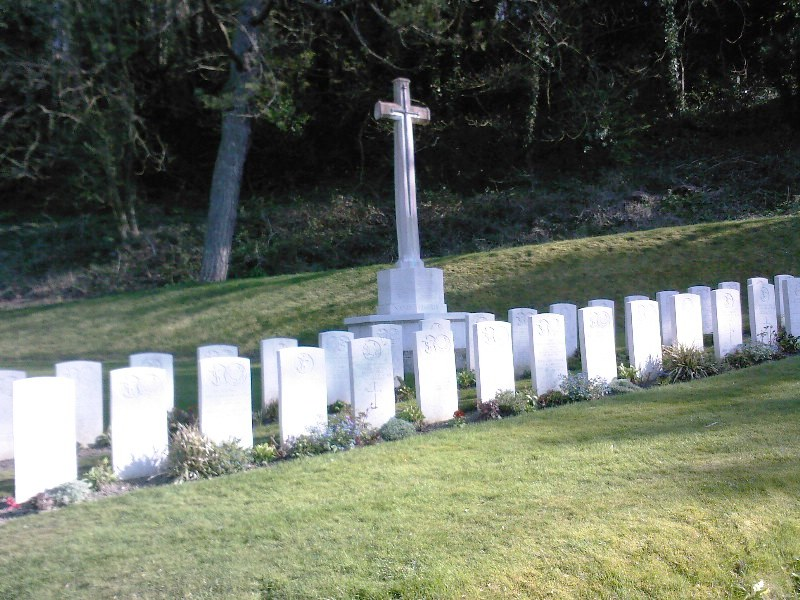
Zeebrugge Plot at St James Cemetery in Dover.

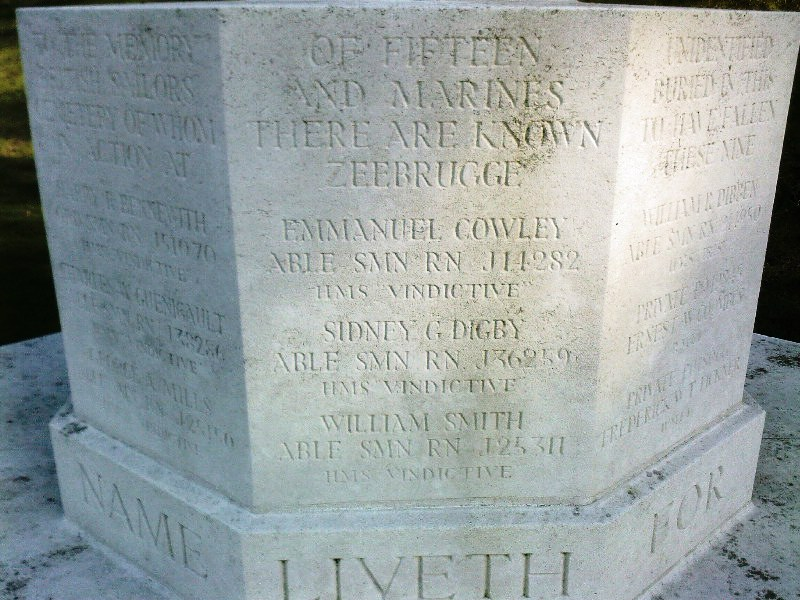
Zeebrugge Cross of Sacrifice, St James Cemetery in Dover.

On St. George's Day, 1964, nine of the 46 survivors then remaining of the 1918 Zeebrugge Raid (from the 1,700 who originally took part) commemorated their lost in a service presided over by the Commandant-General of the Royal Marines, General Sir Malcolm Cartwright-Taylor, KCB, and the Mayor of Deal, Alderman Norman Cavell, JP. It was attended by local dignitaries, representatives from the armed forces, and a personal message from Sir Winston Churchill, himself a freeman of the town of Deal, was read out to those assembled.

It is most fitting that the remarkable and valiant action at Zeebrugge should be commemorated here in Deal, in concert with the tribute to the famous Royal Marines. I send all those at the ceremony, and in particular the survivors, relatives and friends of those who took part in the Zeebrugge raid, my greetings and warm good wishes.

The extensive newspaper coverage of the event notes that the main ceremony took place at the Depot in the main barracks in Deal, and that on 24 April, a visit was arranged to St James's Cemetery in Dover where many casualties from the raid were buried some forty-six years previously, and where there is a special "Zeebrugge" Plot with its own Cross of Sacrifice.

There was no mention of the Hamilton Road cemetery or any visits having taken place to the graves of Lieutenant Sillitoe or Private Bostock (the two casualties of the Zeebrugge Raid buried in the cemetery) in the newspaper reports of the time. Their youngest comrades in arms would have, by this time, been pensioners, and there is only a slight chance that they would have been known or remembered personally by the few remaining ex-Royal Marines Light Infantry of the 4th Battalion who were still alive in 1964.

== 1989: The Deal Barracks Bombing ==
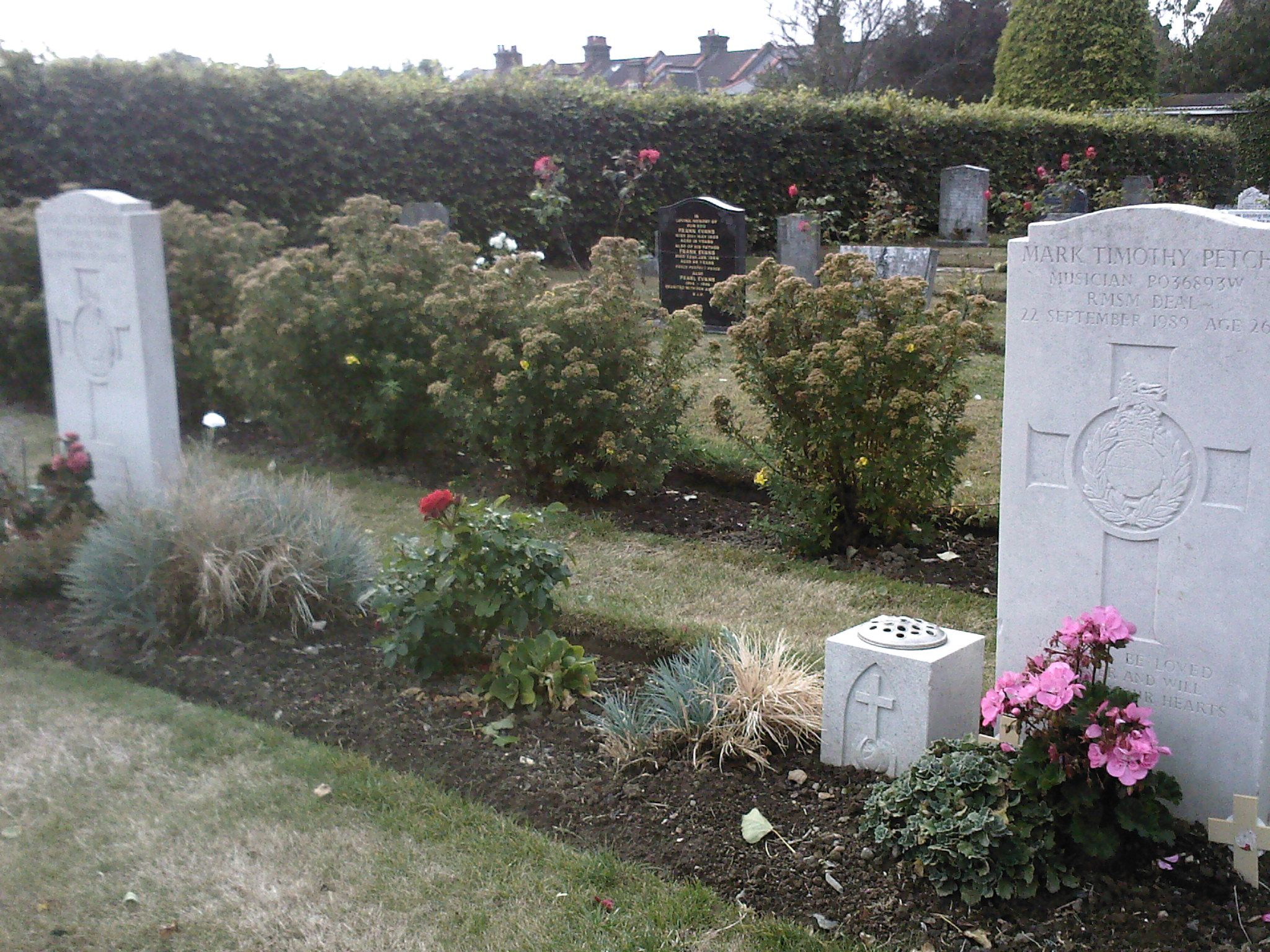
Graves of Royal Marines Bandsmen killed by the IRA in 1989

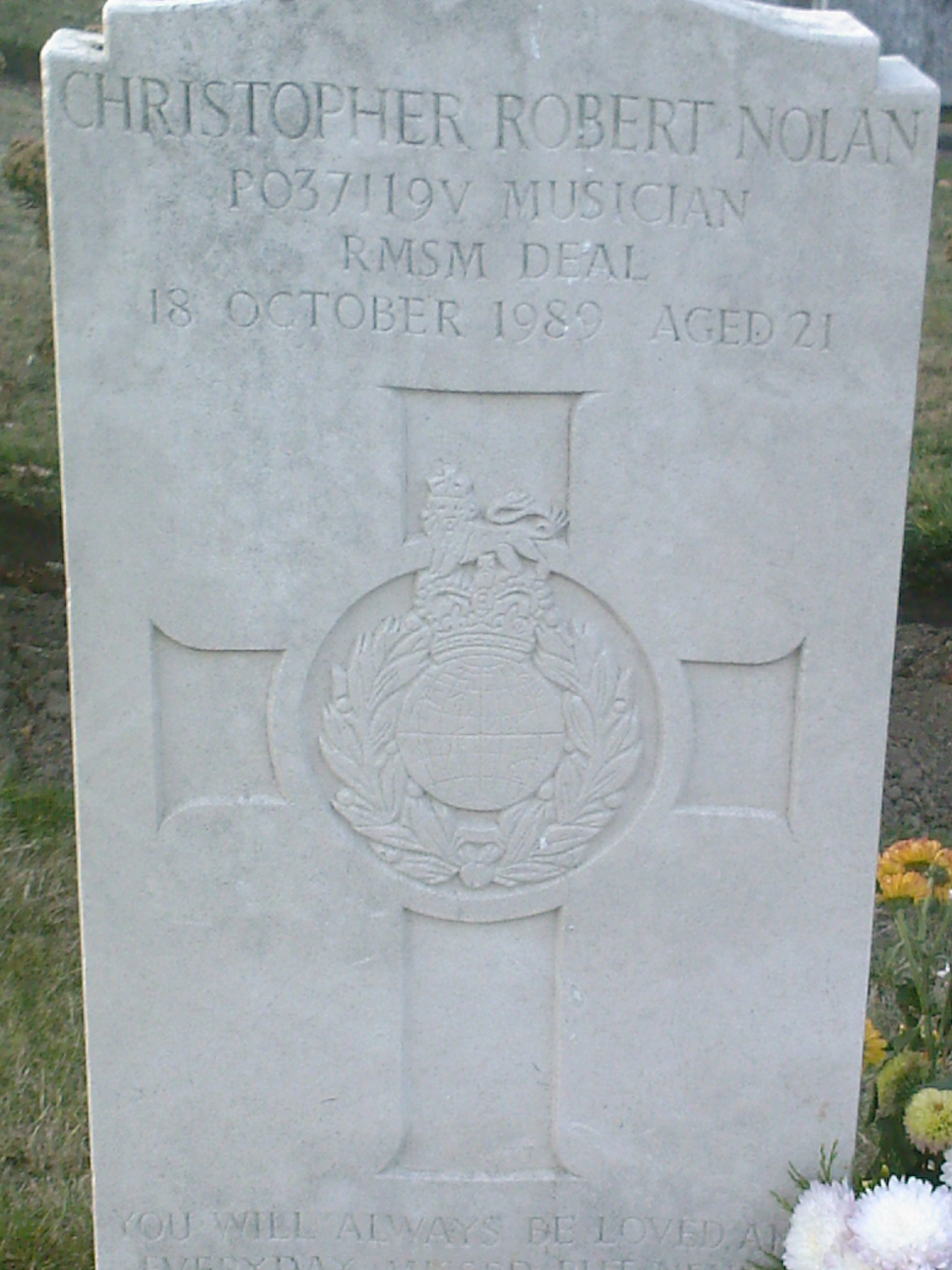
The Gravestone of Christopher Robert Nolan

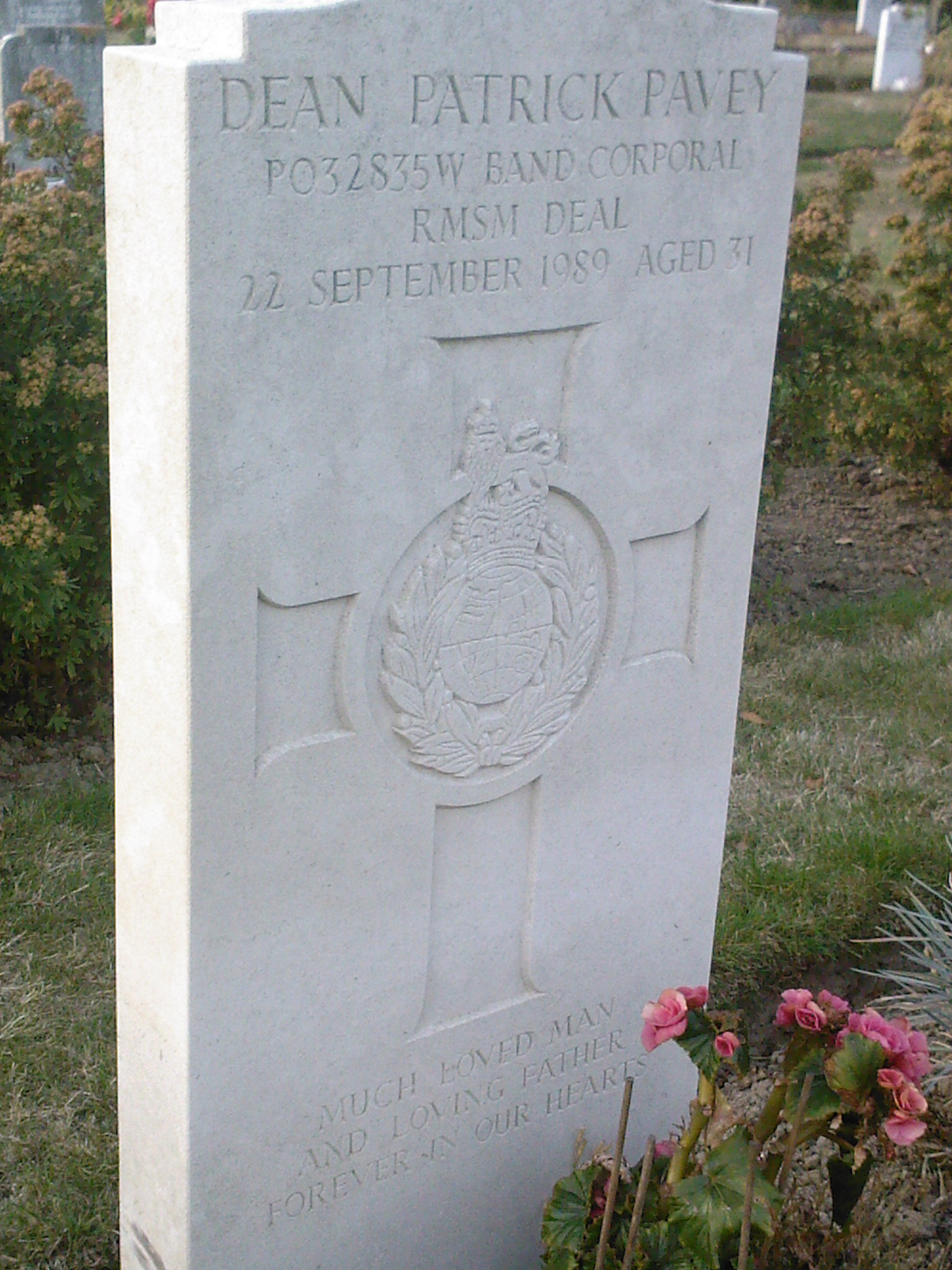
The Gravestone of Dean Patrick Pavey

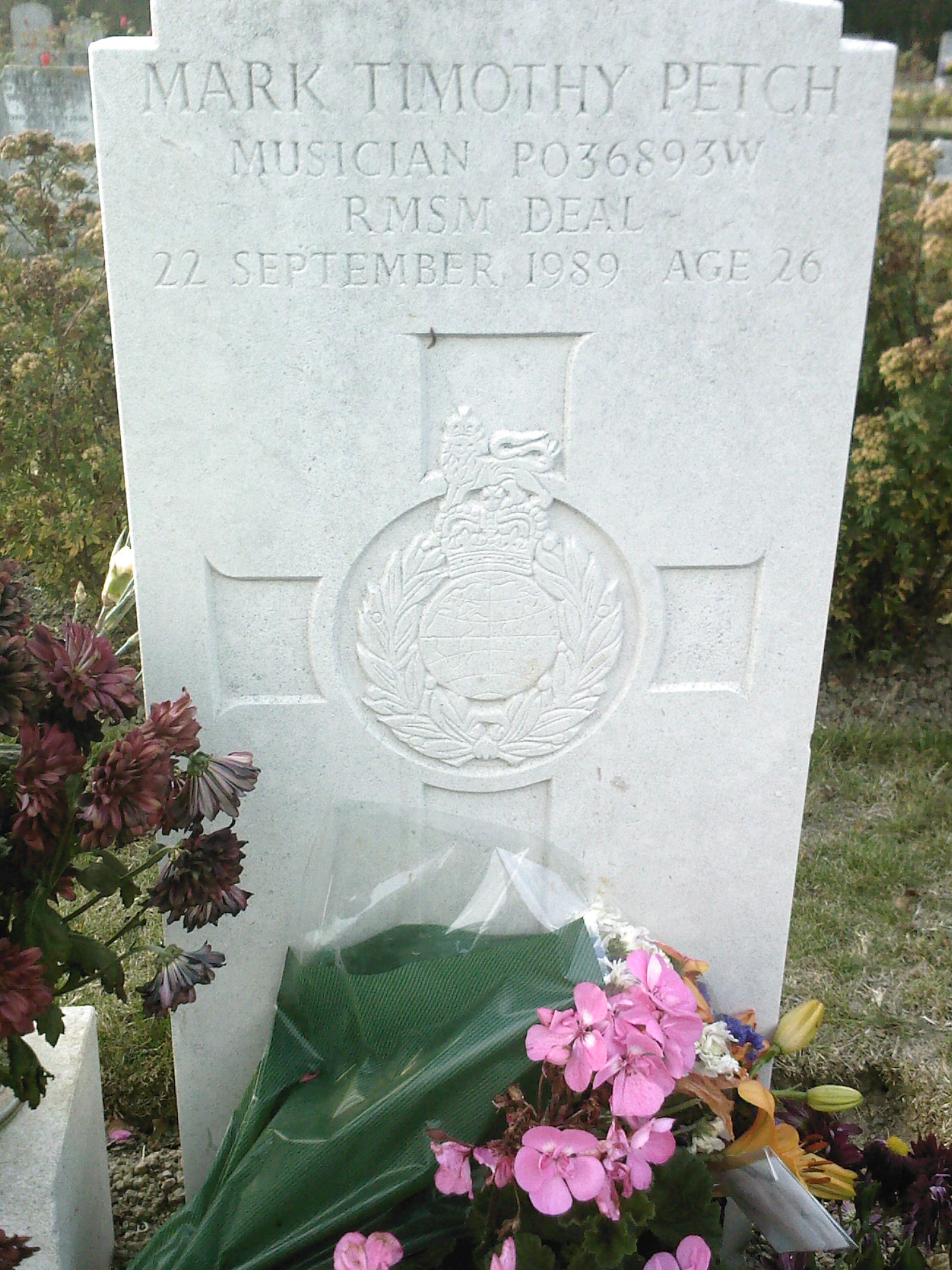
The Gravestone of Mark Timothy Petch

There were no new military interments in the Hamilton Road cemetery after the end of World War II, and it returned to its original role as a municipal facility. The Commonwealth War Graves Commission continued to maintain the military plots of friend and foe alike; the grass was neatly cut, the Portland stone scrubbed clean. Local papers now chronicled troublesome teenagers causing a nuisance late at night.

This all changed in 1989, in the Deal barracks bombing. Three of the eleven Bandsmen killed by the Provisional Irish Republican Army were subsequently buried in the Hamilton Road cemetery, the first military burials in some forty-two years. They were:

1. Musician Christopher Robert Nolan, service number PO37119V, aged just 21.
2. Band Corporal Dean Patrick Pavey, service number PO32835W, aged 31.
3. Musician Mark Timothy Petch, service number PO36893W, aged 26.

Both Band Corporal Pavey and Musician Petch died in the explosion, whereas Robert Nolan died on his wounds some twenty-six days later on 18 October 1989. Their graves are located are in the area of the cemetery managed by the Commonwealth War Graves Commission in the same section as the majority of the cemetery's World War II casualties, in a place of honour. As late as twenty-one years after the event, flowers were still to be found on their graves.

== Hamilton Road Cemetery today ==
For the last twenty-one years, there have been no new military interments, and today the cemetery is still in use. The older public graves, especially those from the 19th century are in an increasingly poor state of repair; many gravestones are wrapped in hazard tape, others tilt at alarming angles, some headstones and crosses lie snapped at their base, and others have been pushed over and lie on the earth for safety reasons.

One sturdier gravestone even sees use as a workbench for contractors cutting tree branches.

Most of the civilian war graves from 1940 to 1945 are in poor repair with a few exceptions, and the inscriptions on these are becoming almost impossible to read. There seems little chance that this will change anytime soon.
