= Robert Nelson (cricketer, born 1912) =

English cricketer

Personal information
- Full name: Robert Prynne Nelson
- Born: 7 August 1912; Fulham, London, England
- Died: 29 October 1940 (aged 28); Deal, Kent, England
- Batting: Left-handed
- Bowling: Slow left-arm orthodox
- Role: All-rounder

Domestic team information
- Years: Team
- 1931–1934: Hertfordshire
- 1932–1933: Middlesex
- 1934–1936: Cambridge University
- 1937–1939: Northamptonshire

Career statistics
Competition	First-class
Matches	77
Runs scored	3,394
Batting average	27.37
100s/50s	2/24
Top score	123*
Balls bowled	5,367
Wickets	62
Bowling average	35.61
5 wickets in innings	0
10 wickets in match	0
Best bowling	3/7
Catches/stumpings	34/–
- Source: CricketArchive, 6 August 2025

Robert Prynne Nelson (7 August 1912 – 29 October 1940) was an English cricketer active from 1931 to 1939 who played for Middlesex and Northamptonshire. He was Northants club captain in the 1938 and 1939 seasons. He appeared in 77 first-class matches as a left-handed batsman who bowled left-arm orthodox spin. He scored 3,394 runs with a highest score of 123 not out, one of two centuries, and took 62 wickets with a best performance of three for 7.

Nelson was born at Fulham, London, son of Robert and Mary Susanna Nelson who later moved to Harpenden, Hertfordshire, and graduated as B.A. from Cambridge University, where he played for its cricket club from 1934 to 1936.

During the Second World War, Nelson was a Second Lieutenant in the Royal Marines. He died when the barracks at Deal, where he was serving, were hit by a bomb dropped from an Italian Fiat BR.20 bomber, part of a squadron sent to attack military installations around the Kent coast. He was 28. His gravestone in the military section of Deal Cemetery records that he was "a lover of cricket [and] he maintained in his life the spirit of the game".
