= HMS Niger =

Seven ships of the Royal Navy have borne the name HMS Niger after the Niger River, whilst another was planned.

- HMS Niger (1759) was a 32-gun fifth rate launched in 1759, reduced to sixth rate, converted to a prison ship in 1810, and renamed Negro in 1813. She was sold in 1814.
- HMS Niger (1813) was a 38-gun fifth rate, launched in 1813 and broken up in 1820.
- HMS Niger (1846) was a wood screw sloop launched in 1846 and sold in 1869.
- HMS Niger (1880) was a composite paddle vessel launched in 1880, renamed Cockatrice in 1881, Moorhen in 1896, and sold in 1899.
- HMS Niger (1892) was a torpedo gunboat launched in 1892, converted to a minesweeper in 1909, and sunk in 1914 by the German submarine U-12 near Deal.
- HMS Niger (J73) was a Halcyon-class minesweeper launched in 1936 and sunk by a mine near Iceland in 1942.
- HMS Niger was to have been an Algerine-class minesweeper. She was laid down in 1944, but was cancelled two months later.
- HMS Niger (J442) was an Algerine-class minesweeper, launched in 1945, and scrapped in 1966.
