= Schomberg (surname) =

Schomberg is a surname, and may refer to:

- A. Thomas Schomberg, American sculptor
- Alexander Schomberg (1720–1804), Royal Navy captain, son of Meyer
- Alexander Schomberg (poet) (1756–1792), English poet and writer on jurisprudence.
- Alexander Wilmot Schomberg (1774–1850), Royal Navy captain, son of Alexander
- Arturo Alfonso Schomburg (1874–1938), Puerto Rican historian of the Harlem Renaissance
- Charles Schomberg, 2nd Duke of Schomberg (1645–1693), general in the Prussian, Dutch and British Army
- Charles de Schomberg (1601–1656), son of Henri, also Marshal of France
- Charles Schomberg, Marquess of Harwich (1683–1713), British soldier
- Charles Frederick Schomberg (1815–1874), Royal Navy admiral, son of Alexander Wilmot
- Charles Marsh Schomberg (1779–1835), Royal Navy captain, colonial governor, son of Alexander
- Colin Schomberg, Australian rugby league footballer
- Frederick Schomberg, 1st Duke of Schomberg (1615–1690/6–1690), marshal of France and a general in the English and Portuguese Army
- Gaspard de Schomberg (c. 1540–1599), French soldier and courtier
- George Augustus Schomberg (1821–1907), British Royal Marines officer
- Georges de Schomberg (c.1560–1578), French soldier and courtier
- Henri de Schomberg (1575–1632), Marshal of France during the reign of Louis XIII
- Hermann Schomberg (1907–1975), German film and television actor
- Isaac Schomberg (1753–1813), controversial officer of the British Royal Navy
- Isaac Schomberg (physician) (1714–1780), German physician
- Meinhardt Schomberg, 3rd Duke of Schomberg (1641–1719), general in the service of Prince William of Orange (later King William III of England)
- Meyer Löw Schomberg (1690–1761), German-Jewish physician who moved to London
- Otto Schomberg (1864–1927), American baseball player
- Ralph Schomberg (1714–1792), British doctor 18th century doctor, son of Meyer
- Reginald Schomberg (1880–1958), British army officer and explorer
