= Alexander Schomberg (disambiguation) =

Alexander Schomberg (1720–1804) was a Royal Navy officer who served in the French and Indian War.

Alexander Schomberg may also refer to:

- Alexander Wilmot Schomberg (1774–1850), officer of the British Royal Navy
- Alexander Schomberg (poet) (1756–1792), English poet and writer on jurisprudence
