= Isaac Schomberg =

Isaac Schomberg may refer to:

- Isaac Schomberg (physician) (1714–1780), German physician
- Isaac Schomberg (Royal Navy officer) (1753–1813), officer of the British Royal Navy
