= William Sherlock =

William Sherlock may refer to:

- William Sherlock (theologian) (c. 1639/1641–1707), English church leader and theologian
- William Sherlock (cricketer) (1881–1937), Demerara born cricketer
- William Sherlock (painter), Irish artist
- William Pengree Sherlock, British artist
