= Isaac Schomberg (Royal Navy officer) =

Officer of the British Royal Navy

Captain Isaac Schomberg
- Born: 27 March 1753; Great Yarmouth
- Died: 21 January 1813 (aged 59); Cadogan Place, Chelsea
- Spouse: Amelia Brodrick (m. 1793)
- Military career
- Allegiance: United Kingdom
- Branch: Royal Navy
- Service years: 1770–1813
- Rank: Captain
- Commands: HMS Labrador; HMS Hinchinbrook; HMS Crown; HMS Atalanta; HMS Vanguard; HMS Culloden; HMS Magnanime; Harwich Sea Fencibles; Hastings Sea Fencibles; Commissioner of the Navy
- Conflicts: American Revolutionary War; Relief of Gibraltar; Battle of Saint Kitts; Battle of the Saintes; French Revolutionary Wars; Glorious First of June; Napoleonic Wars
- Other work: Naval historian

Captain Isaac Schomberg (27 March 1753 – 21 January 1813) was a highly controversial officer of the British Royal Navy whose constant disputes with senior officers resulted in courts-martial, lawsuits and the eventual stagnation of his career. However, despite his contentious nature, Schomberg was a brave officer who gained distinction in several actions during the American Revolutionary and French Revolutionary Wars. He finished his career as a commissioner of the Navy and devoted most of the last fifteen years of his life to writing an influential history of naval operations in and around Britain.

Schomberg was born in London to Ralph Schomberg, son of Meyer Löw Schomberg both prominent physicians of German Jewish descent, although his father had converted to the Anglican faith in his youth. His mother was Elizabeth Crowcher, daughter of a wealthy merchant from Wapping. One of ten children with seven uncles, Schomberg's family were very prominent in middle-class eighteenth century London and Isaac (not to be confused with his uncle Isaac Schomberg, a prominent doctor) grew up in a literary environment, his father a common contributor to medical and literary journals.

== American Revolutionary War ==
In 1770, Schomberg became the second of his large family to join the Royal Navy, taking commission as a midshipman. He was initially attached to the royal yacht Royal Charlotte but within six months had secured a position on his uncle Alexander Schomberg's ship HMS Prudent. In 1771 he was again transferred, to HMS Trident, commanded by Sir Peter Denis. For the next three years Schomberg served on Trident in the Mediterranean, with two brief detachments to other ships. At the outbreak of the American Revolutionary War, Schomberg moved to HMS Romney on the Newfoundland station.

Aboard Romney, Schomberg came to the attention of a succession of senior officers, including George Elphinstone, Robert Duff and John Montagu. This patronage enabled his advancement to lieutenant and command of the schooner HMS Labrador and brig HMS Hinchinbroke. In 1778, Schomberg returned to Europe aboard HMS Europe. In 1779, Schomberg took position on the ship of the line HMS Canada, whose captain commended him on his excellent seamanship. In 1781, Canada was at the relief of the Great Siege of Gibraltar and later in the same year captured the Spanish frigate Santa Leocadia. By the end of the year, Schomberg was in the West Indies and saw action in Canada at the Battle of St Kitts and the Battle of the Saintes, where he distinguished himself.

== Dispute with Prince William ==
Returning to Europe at the peace aboard HMS Barfleur, Schomberg was unemployed until 1786 on half-pay. Returning to the sea, Schomberg was appointed mentor to the notoriously prickly Prince William Henry, then serving as captain of HMS Pegasus. Schomberg was far older and more experienced than his commander and also possessed an aggressive temperament, the two rapidly becoming embroiled in a series of bitter and long-lasting disputes. Eventually, in 1787 whilst stationed in the West Indies, Nelson solved the problem by removing Schomberg from Pegasus under arrest for a charge trumped-up by William. Within days, the charges were quietly dropped and Schomberg returned to Britain. Three months later Sir Samuel Hood appointed Schomberg to his flagship Barfleur. Hood had served with both Schomberg and Prince William before and was well aware of the circumstances of the argument, appointing Schomberg in the hopes of ending the dispute. This hope was dashed when William responded with a torrent of extremely offensive letters to Schomberg, Hood and anyone else who would listen.

In 1788 Schomberg was appointed to HMS Crown under an old friend, William Cornwallis. For the next two years Schomberg served as acting captain of Crown and then commander of HMS Atalanta in the Indian Ocean, a period in which he was described as "happy beyond expression". Controversy was not far behind however, and in 1790 Schomberg sent two offensive letters to the colonial government in Madras complaining that his ship had not been given the correct salute when it entered the port. These letters were passed on to Sir Richard Strachan and Cornwallis who were so shocked at Schomberg's effrontery that he was dismissed his ship and sent back to England. Cornwallis did however recommend that no further action be taken against him, commenting that the dispute with Prince William had embittered his former friend. Before news of this controversy reached England, Schomberg had been promoted to post captain.

== French Revolutionary Wars ==
In 1793, shortly after the outbreak of the French Revolutionary Wars, Schomberg married Amelia Brodrick, a parson's daughter from Stradbally, Ireland. The couple would have several children including four surviving sons. Later in the year, Schomberg was made captain of HMS Vanguard and early in 1794 moved to HMS Culloden with the Channel Fleet under Lord Howe. With this fleet, Culloden was engaged at the Glorious First of June, but Schomberg was heavily criticised for not entering the action until late in the day when most of the fighting was over. He was not awarded the medal given to most of the captains at the battle and, like many officers passed over for recognition in the action, suffered a permanent stain on his record. In 1795, Schomberg was appointed to the large frigate HMS Magnanime and served off Ireland until 1796 escorting convoys. This was his last sea-going command, his controversial behaviour making him politically undesirable and poor health making him less able serve effectively.

== Historian ==
Retiring to Seend in Wiltshire in 1796, Schomberg returned to a lifelong project, a historical work in five volumes named A Naval Chronology, or, An Historical Summary of Naval and Maritime Events from the Time of the Romans to the Treaty of Peace, 1802. This seminal work contained, in addition to a prose history, several detailed and extensive appendices. In 1801, he took command of the local Sea Fencibles, a coastal militia force, and in 1808 was responsible for their disbandment, reasoning that the country was no longer in danger from French invasion. For this, he was made a commissioner of the Navy, and he remained in that position until his death in 1813 at his home in Cadogan Place, Chelsea, London. He was buried in the family crypt at St George in the East, Stepney.
