= David Hannay =

David Hannay may refer to:

- David Hannay (historian) (1853–1934), English naval historian
- David Hannay, Baron Hannay of Chiswick (born 1935), British diplomat
- David Hannay (producer) (1939–2014), Australian film producer
