= General Schomberg =

General Schomberg may refer to:

- George Augustus Schomberg (1821–1907), Royal Marines general
- Charles Schomberg, 2nd Duke of Schomberg (1645–1693), general in the Prussian, Dutch and British Armies
- Frederick Schomberg, 1st Duke of Schomberg (1615–1690), English and Portuguese Army general
- Meinhardt Schomberg, 3rd Duke of Schomberg (1641–1719), general in the service of Willem, Prince of Orange
