= Henry Headley =

English poet and critic

Henry Headley (1765–1788) was an English poet and critic.

== Life ==
Baptised at Irstead, Norfolk, 27 April 1765, he was only son of Henry Headley, rector of that parish to 1768, and then vicar of North Walsham to his death on 6 October 1785, at the age of 57; his mother, Mary Anne Barchard, married (on 21 September 1789), after her first husband's death, Anthony Taylor of Gorleston, Great Yarmouth, and died 13 October 1818, at age 85. His sister Elizabeth married Woodbine Parish (1768–1848), and was mother of Sir Woodbine Parish.

Headley was one of Samuel Parr's pupils at Colchester grammar school, and idle; he went with Parr to Norwich, given another chance. On 14 January 1782 he was admitted a commoner of Trinity College, Oxford, under the tuition of the Rev. Charles Jesse, and was shortly elected scholar. William Lisle Bowles, the poet, and William Benwell, a man of literary taste, were also scholars, and became his friends. Thomas Warton was then a fellow of the college, and a significant influence on Headley.

After a secretive marriage, Headley returned to Oxford to take his degree of B.A., 16 May 1786, with his wife. His next residence was at Norwich, where he worked on the old English poets, but he had been delicate from his youth, and fell victim to consumption. He went alone to Lisbon in May 1788 in the hope of improving his health. With a letter of recommendation from William Windham he was admitted into the house of Lewis de Visme at Cintra, but his strength declined. In August he decided to return to Norwich, and after two months of suffering died on 15 November 1788.

Headley was buried at North Walsham on 20 November near his parents and two sisters. An elegant inscription, composed, at the widow's request, by William Benwell, for a monument to his memory, was made public by Henry Kett in 1790. His widow married again.

== Works ==
=== Select Beauties ===
Headley's major work, which made his reputation, was Select Beauties of Ancient English Poetry. With Remarks (1787, 2 vols.); a second edition, with a biographical sketch by his friend the Rev. Henry Kett, appeared in 1810. It was dedicated to his friend William Windham, and was a popular success.

The Critical Remarks of the late Henry Headley, which were added to an edition of Phineas Fletcher's Purple Island in 1816, were extracts from the Select Beauties. A writer in Blackwood's Magazine in 1835 drew attention to wholesale plagiarism from Headley's notes and criticisms in Robert Anderson's Collection of the Poets.

A poem to Headley's memory by William Lisle Bowles was in the Gentleman's Magazine in 1788. It was included in Bowles's Sonnets and other Poems, was prefixed, with the lines by Henry Kett, to a reissue of Select Beauties.

=== Other works ===
Headley published anonymously in 1785 a volume of Fugitive Pieces, all of which were written at the age of 19, and most of which had previously appeared in print. They were reissued with additions in 1786 as Poems and other Pieces by Henry Headley, and the book was inscribed to Dr. P—r (Samuel Parr). These poems were subsequently included in Richard Alfred Davenport's British Poets, vol. lxxiii., and in Thomas Park's Poets, vol. xli.

To the Olla Podrida of Thomas Monro, a close friend at school and college, Headley contributed a number on the horrors depicted by the authors of modern tragedies' and he is said to have been one of the writers in The Lounger's Miscellany, or the Lucubrations of Abel Slug, Esq., which ran to twenty numbers in 1788 and 1789. As "C. T. O." he published articles in the Gentleman's Magazine. William Beloe published other works in the Sexagenarian.

== Family ==
During his vacation visits from Oxford to his friends in Norfolk, Headley fell in love, with a woman referred to in his poems as Myra. Friends disapproved, and she was prevailed upon to marry a rival. The death of his father freed him from constraints, and he left Oxford in 1785, without taking leave. He was then, apparently, privately married to another woman, and went to Matlock.

== Notes ==
Attribution

This article incorporates text from a publication now in the public domain: Stephen, Leslie; Lee, Sidney, eds. (1891). "Headley, Henry". Dictionary of National Biography. Vol. 25. London: Smith, Elder & Co.
