= Charles Schomberg =

Charles Schomberg may refer to:

- Charles Frederick Schomberg (1815–1874), admiral in the British Royal Navy
- Charles Marsh Schomberg (1779–1835), naval officer and colonial governor
- Charles Schomberg, 2nd Duke of Schomberg (1645–1693), general in the Prussian, Dutch and British Army
- Charles Schomberg, Marquess of Harwich (1683–1713), British soldier
- Charles de Schomberg (1601–1656), Duke of Halluin and Marshal of France
