= Henry Kett =

English clergyman, academic and writer (1761–1825)

Henry Kett (12 February 1761 – 30 June 1825) was an English clergyman, academic and writer.

== Life ==
Son of Benjamin and Mary Kett, he was born in the parish of St. Peter's Mancroft, Norwich, 12 February 1761. His father was a cordwainer and freeman of Norwich, and he himself was admitted to the freedom of the city on 28 August 1784. He was educated at Norwich School by the Rev. William Lemon, and matriculated as commoner inf. ord. of Trinity College, Oxford, on 18 March 1777, graduating B.A. 1780, M.A. 1783, B.D. 1793. He was elected Blount exhibitioner 26 May 1777, scholar 15 June 1778, and fellow 5 June 1784, retaining his fellowship until 1824. His name occurs as the tutor of various undergraduates from 1784 to 1809, but the period during which he acted as college tutor probably ranged from 1799 to 1808.

In 1789, Kett visited France and saw the early days of the French Revolution. He was Bampton lecturer in 1790, and in the same year played the major part in raising a subscription for John Uri, when he was discharged by the delegates of the Clarendon Press from his position as cataloguer of the Oriental manuscripts in the Bodleian Library. He was select preacher 1801–2, and classical examiner during 1803–4. On 31 October 1793 he unsuccessfully contested the Professorship of Poetry at Oxford against James Hurdis. In 1802 he canvassed again for the same post, but refrained from going to the poll. On the first occasion he published, as his credentials for the professorship, a volume of Juvenile Poems, most of which had appeared in the Gentleman's Magazine, but he afterwards endeavoured to suppress it.

His person lent itself to caricature, and in June 1807 he was depicted by Robert Dighton in 'A View from Trinity' as a tall man, with his hands behind his back. In his younger days Kett was grave, but he afterwards became a beau, learnt dancing, and sought a reputation for gallantry. He rejected many college livings, and twice missed the college headship. Through Joseph Chapman, President of his college, he held the incumbency of Elsfield, near Oxford, from 22 May 1785 to 28 June 1804; from July 1812 to 1820 he was vicar of Sutton Benger, Wiltshire, and in 1814 he was nominated by Bishop George Tomline as perpetual curate of Hykeham in Lincolnshire. He was also king's preacher at Whitehall; but these appointments did not compel him to leave Oxford, and he resided in college until his marriage at Charlton Kings, Gloucestershire, in December 1823, to Miss White.

Kett was vain and subject to fits of depression. He was found drowned at Stanwell, Middlesex, on 30 June 1825. His widow married at St. James's, Piccadilly, on 28 November 1828, the Rev. Thomas Nicholl. Kett gave to his college, in addition to large subscriptions to various buildings and some plate, portraits of William Pope, earl of Downe, and the first earl of Chatham. The bulk of his fortune, about £25,000, was left after his widow's death to three public charities, one being the Radcliffe Infirmary at Oxford.

== Appearance ==
Kett's appearance was the frequent subject of Oxford humour. His unusually long face and large nose inspired Tom Warton's epigram on his Juvenile Poems: "Our Kett not a poet / Why how can you say so? / For if he's no Ovid / I'm sure he's a Naso." The length of his face also led the university wits to nickname him "Horse" Kett. In 1809, Edward Copleston attacked Kett's Logic Made Easy in The Examiner Examined, placing on the title-page as a motto a passage from Virgil's Aeneid: "Aut haec in nostros fabricata est machina muros, / Aut aliquis latet error; equo ne credite, Teucri" ("Either this machine has been built against our walls, or some deceit lies hidden; do not trust the horse, Trojans"). The personal allusion was considered particularly impertinent, and Copleston incurred censure for it.

The nickname continued to inspire practical jokes. One account records that, when Kett's back was turned during a lecture, students would fill his snuff box with oats. His letter box was similarly used: on one occasion, when Dr Kidd heard a rattle in it and asked what was inside, Kett reportedly replied, "Only a note (an oat)." His supposed resemblance to a horse also prompted the students to send him to the celebrated animal painter George Stubbs when he wished to have his portrait painted; Stubbs, expecting a commission for a filly or colt, was surprised to discover that Kett wanted his portrait in full canonicals.

== Works ==
Kett was the author of:

- Bampton Sermons, 1791, consisting of A Representation of the Conduct and Opinions of the Primitive Christians, with Remarks on Gibbon and Priestley; 2nd edit., with corrections and additions, 1792. It has been suggested that Samuel Parr assisted him in this work.
- Juvenile Poems, 1793.
- History the Interpreter of Prophecy, 1799, 3 vols.; and numerous editions in later years. It was dedicated to George Pretyman Tomline, to whom Kett on his death left the copyright.
- Elements of General Knowledge, 1802, 2 vols., based on a course of lectures which he had read to his pupils during the previous twelve years. The appendix of fifty-two pages contained a list of books, in the classical part of which Richard Porson was consulted. There were numerous editions of this work, the eighth appearing in 1815. Some of its blunders were pointed out by John Davison in A Short Account of certain Notable Discoveries contained in a Recent Work, pt. i. 1803 [by Phileleutheros Orielensis], pt. ii. 1804. It was defended, probably by Kett himself in the disguise of 'S. Nobody, of King's College, Oxford,' in The Biter Bit, or Discoveries Discovered in a Pamphlet of certain Notable Discoveries, 1804; and by Frederick Nolan of Exeter College, in A Letter to Phileleutheros Orielensis, 1804, upholding the view that Kett's errors were due to carelessness rather than ignorance.
- Emily, a moral Tale, 2nd edit. 1809.
- A Tour to the Lakes of Cumberland and Westmoreland in August 1798, published in William Fordyce Mavor's British Tourists' Companion, v. 117–57.
- Logic made Easy, or a short View of the Aristotelic System of Reasoning, 1809. An attack on it was made in The Examiner Examined, or Logic Vindicated. By a Graduate [i.e. Edward Copleston], 1809, and it was later suppressed by Kett.
- The Flowers of Wit, or a Choice Collection of Bon Mots, 1814, 2 vols.

Kett contributed five papers to the Olla Podrida of Thomas Monro. His life of William Benwell was appended to a volume of Poems, Odes, Prologues, and Epilogues spoken at Reading School, 1804, pp. 205–23; and his memoir of Henry Headley, with some verses on Headley's death, was inserted in the Select Beauties of Ancient English Poetry (1810 edit., pp. xx–ii). To Frederic Shoberl's translation of François-René de Chateaubriand's Beauties of Christianity he supplied a preface and notes. His translations of John Jortin's poems were reprinted in Jortin's miscellaneous works; numerous pieces by him appeared in the Gentleman's Magazine, and several letters to and from him are in John Johnstone's Samuel Parr, and in Thomas Frognall Dibdin's Reminiscences. He left many manuscripts, including an edition of the Greek proverb collection by Eilhardus Lubinus, with English translation and notes.
