= Ship Creek (New Zealand) =

River in New Zealand

Coordinates: 43°45′19″S 169°08′55″E

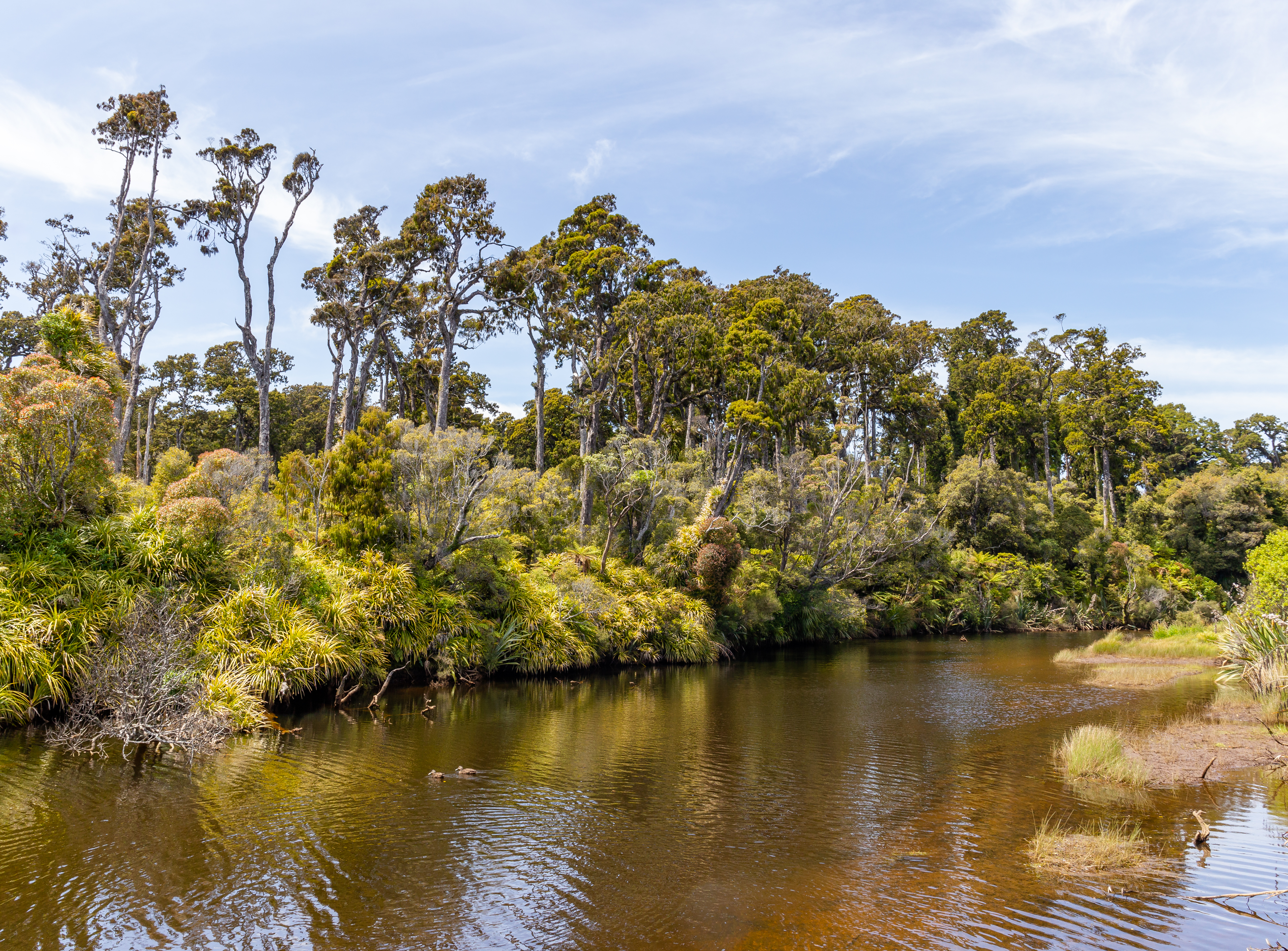
- Ship Creek from swamp forest walk
- Native name: Tauparikākā (Māori)

Location
- Country: New Zealand

Physical characteristics
- Mouth
  - location: Tasman Sea
- Length: 11 km (6.8 mi)

Ship Creek (Māori: Tauparikākā) is a small river that flows into an area of coastal swamp forest on the West Coast of New Zealand's South Island. Ship Creek is approximately 11 km (6.8 mi) long and flows northwest from catchment areas on the slopes of Bald Hill, reaching the Tasman Sea around 20 km (12 mi) north-east of Haast. Near the mouth of Ship Creek, there are short walks around dune lakes and ancient kahikatea swamp forest.

== Toponymy ==
The original Māori name for the creek and the local area is Tauparikākā, which, according to local Māori, references "parrots all walking in a row".

The name Ship Creek derives from the discovery of part of the hull of a wrecked ship at this location in the 1870s. A piece of the wreck was sent to Wellington for examination. Details of the construction indicated the possibility that the timbers came from the wreck of the SS Schomberg, a clipper ship on her maiden voyage from Liverpool to Melbourne that struck an uncharted reef and was wrecked on the Shipwreck Coast on 27 December 1855. A piece of the wreck was then sent to Melbourne, and this provided further support for the identification of the timbers as coming from the wreck of the Schomberg. The parts of the hull found at Ship Creek had drifted 2,000 km (1,200 mi) across the Tasman Sea from the coast of Victoria, to come ashore on the beach north of Haast. Over time, the build up of sand led to the wreckage being inland from the high tide mark on the shores of Ship Creek, and became covered in scrub.

== Geography ==
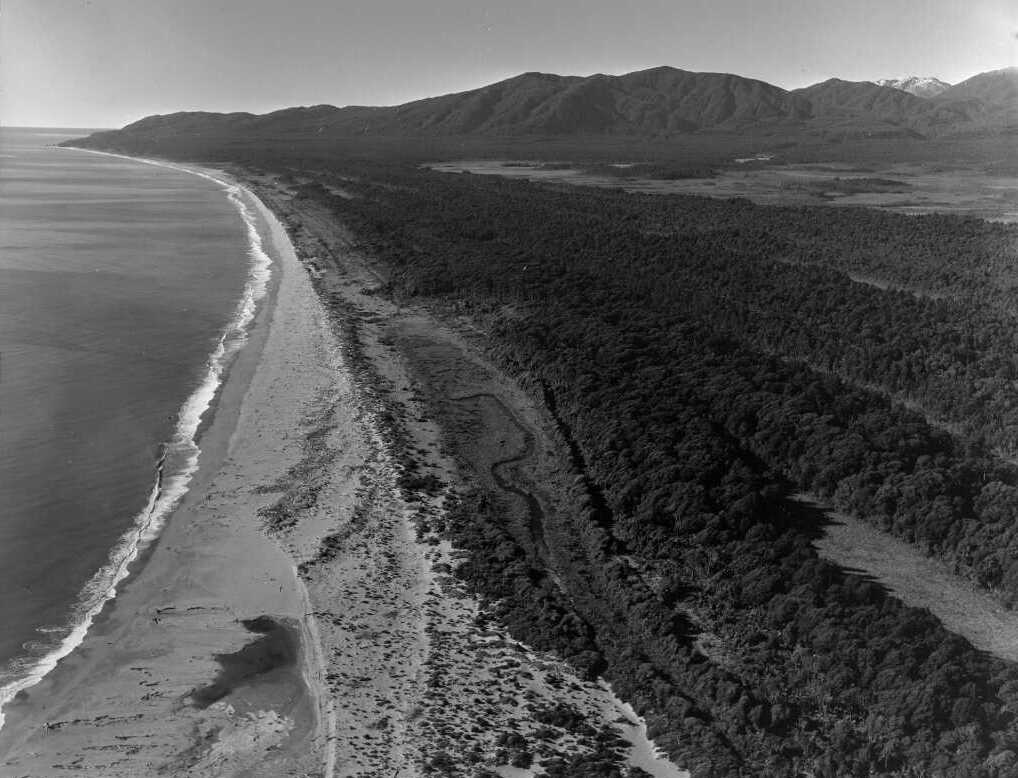
Haast coastline - showing parallel lines of dunes and swales

Ship Creek is at the northern end of the Haast plain that extends 50 km (31 mi) to Jackson Bay / Okahu. The plain has an unusual landform, with long parallel lines of low hills with narrow swales in between. In some places, the plain is 10 km (6.2 mi) wide, with six rows of dunes and swales. The landform results from the combined effects of sediment carried to the coast by six large rivers, longshore drift and periodic seismic uplifts. The rivers discharging into the Tasman sea in this region of coastline drain from large catchment areas in the Southern Alps, where there is high rainfall and the mountains have high rates of erosion. The suspended sediment yield of the Arawhata River has been reported as 7.18 Mt/yr, and the Haast River as 5.93 Mt/yr. The total estimated suspended sediment yield from rivers in South Westland is over 50 Mt/yr. Longshore drift leads to much of this sediment being deposited along the Haast coastline, forming dunes. The Alpine Fault runs along the inland edge of the plain, and the entire area is subject to tectonic uplift during major seismic events. Following a major uplift, existing dunes are no longer exposed to the action of the sea, and new dunes begin to form. This creates a longitudinal pattern of dunes with low-lying wetlands in between. The coastal plain is approximately 6,000 years old. The dunes close to the current shoreline have little vegetation, but the older dunes further inland are forested with tall podocarps. The swales contain wetland lakes, pakihi and kahikatea swamp forest.

== Ship Creek walks ==
There is a car park adjacent to State Highway 6 that provides access to two short walks.

=== Dune lake walk ===
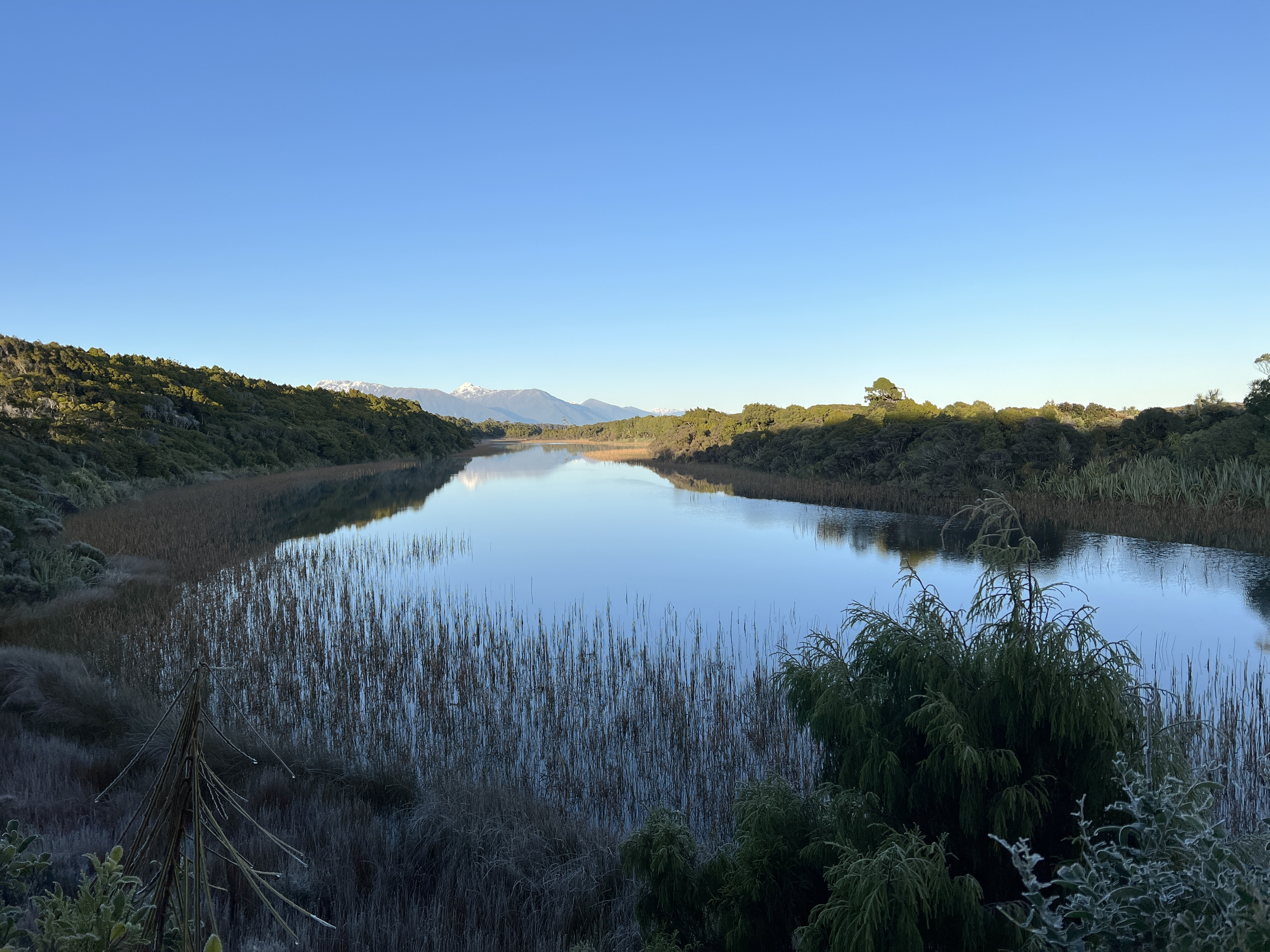
Dune lake from walkway at Ship Creek

This 1 km-long (0.62 mi) loop walk begins at an information centre beneath a shelter. A boardwalk follows along the current active sand dunes, passing through the most recent swale between dunes, and an older dune that is now forested. The forest in this area has been stunted by the action of the wind. The views from the beach to the south-west extend to Jackson Head.

Notable vegetation in the dunes includes the sedge pingao which binds sand. Flax grows at the outer limit of the areas of low scrub and forest. As the path moves inland onto longer established dunes, the plants that can be seen include toetoe, mingimingi, Coprosma rhamnoides, cabbage tree, māhoe, and Hall's tōtara. Ferns include hound's tongue fern and kiokio. Older and more stable dunes support taller forest where there is kāmahi, karamū, southern rātā, kiekie, tree fuchsia and mountain three-finger.

An observation platform provides views over Lake Mataketake in the swale between the lines of dunes. The return path passes through more mature forest on older dunes. A second observation platform allows a different view over the dune lake. There is dense forest on the rest of return path, with thick ground cover and plants at many levels, including climbing vines (scarlet rātā, kiekie) and many epiphytes, including ferns and orchids.

=== Kahikatea swamp forest walk ===
This is an 800 m-long (0.50 mi) loop track on a boardwalk, following Ship Creek to an area of dense coastal swamp forest with a large number of kahikatea (Dacrycarpus dacrydioides), New Zealand’s tallest tree.

== Tauparikākā Marine Reserve ==
The Tauparikākā Marine Reserve is a small protected area, established in 2014, located immediately offshore of the mouth of Ship Creek. The reserve extends 630 m (2,070 ft) along the shoreline, including the creek mouth, and 200 m (0.11 nmi) out from the shore.

== See also ==
- List of rivers of New Zealand
