= Embassy of Iraq, London =

Embassy in London

Coordinates: 51.499515°N 0.180143°W

Embassy of Republic Iraq in London
- Location: South Kensington, London
- Address: 21 Queen's Gate, London, SW7 5JE
- Ambassador: Mohammad Jafar al-Sadr
- Website: https://mofa.gov.iq/london/en/authorization/

The Embassy of Iraq in London, (officially the Embassy of The Republic Of Iraq ) (Arabic: سفرية جمهورية العراق في لندن) is the diplomatic mission of Iraq in the United Kingdom. It was opened at its current site in 2012, having been closed since 2003 with the start of the Iraq War.

== Other offices ==
Iraq also maintains a Consular Section at 3 Elvaston Place, South Kensington, a Military Attaché Office at 48 Gunnersbury Avenue, Gunnersbury, a Cultural Attaché's Office at 14–15 Child's Place, Earl's Court and a Commercial Attaché Office at 20 Queen's Gate, London, adjacent to the main embassy building. The Commercial Attaché Office was previously located at 7–10 Leadenhall Street, London, the freehold of which is still held by the Iraqi Ministry of Foreign Affairs, although the property has remained vacant since the relocation.

The Kurdistan Regional Government also maintains an office at 2 Hobart Place, Belgravia.

== History ==
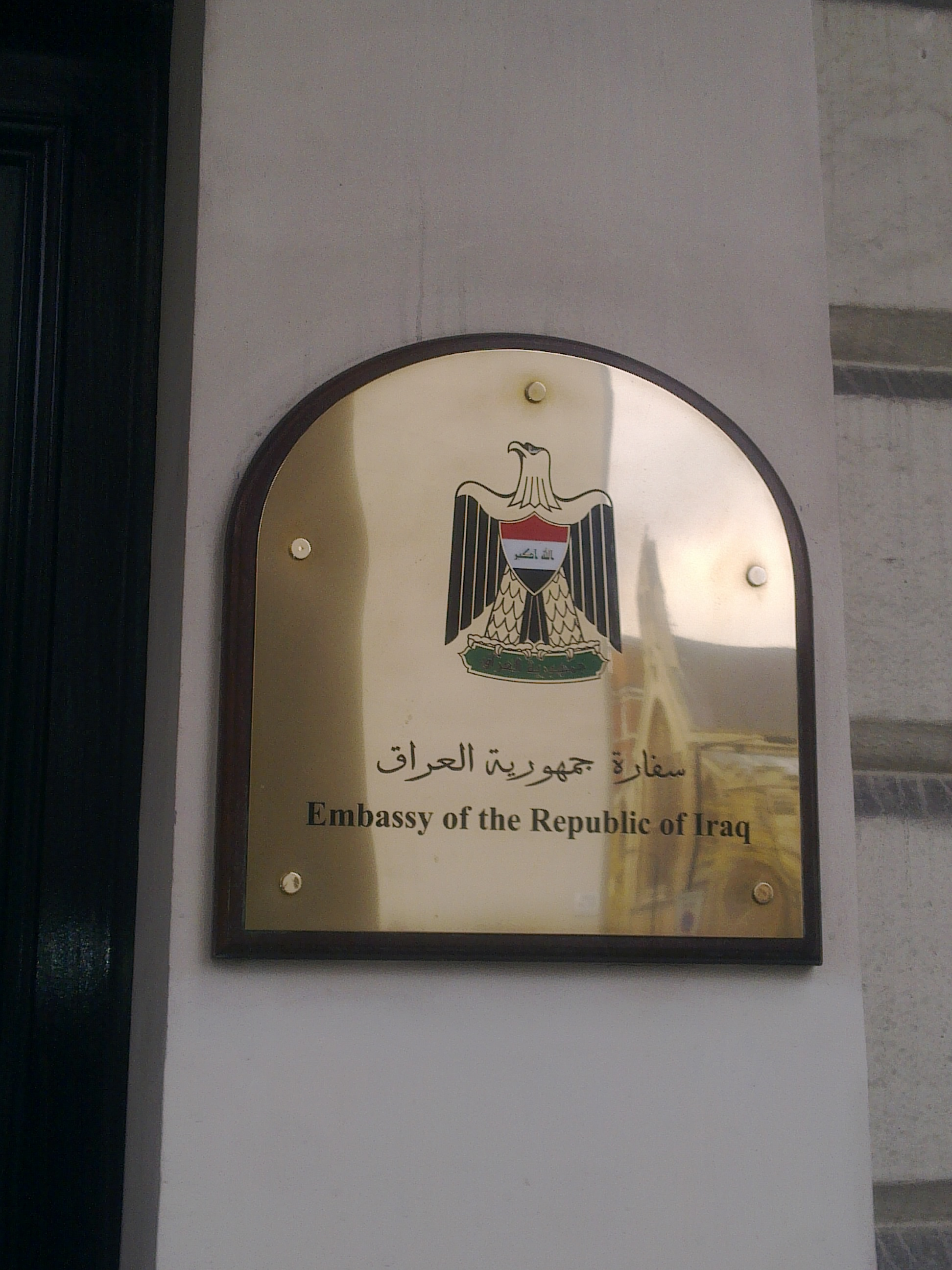
Plaque outside the embassy in Arabic and English depicting the Coat of arms of Iraq

Whilst preparing for the re-opening of the embassy in 2005, Iraqi diplomats found numerous guns, ammunition and surveillance equipment hidden in the embassy. It is assumed that these were left over from Iraqi agents during the Saddam Hussein-era. Iraqi agents had been implicated in several attempted assassinations in the capital during the 1970s–1980s, including the assassination of former Iraqi Prime Minister Abd ar-Razzaq an-Naif in 1978.
