= Tauparikākā Marine Reserve =

Marine reserve in New Zealand territorial waters

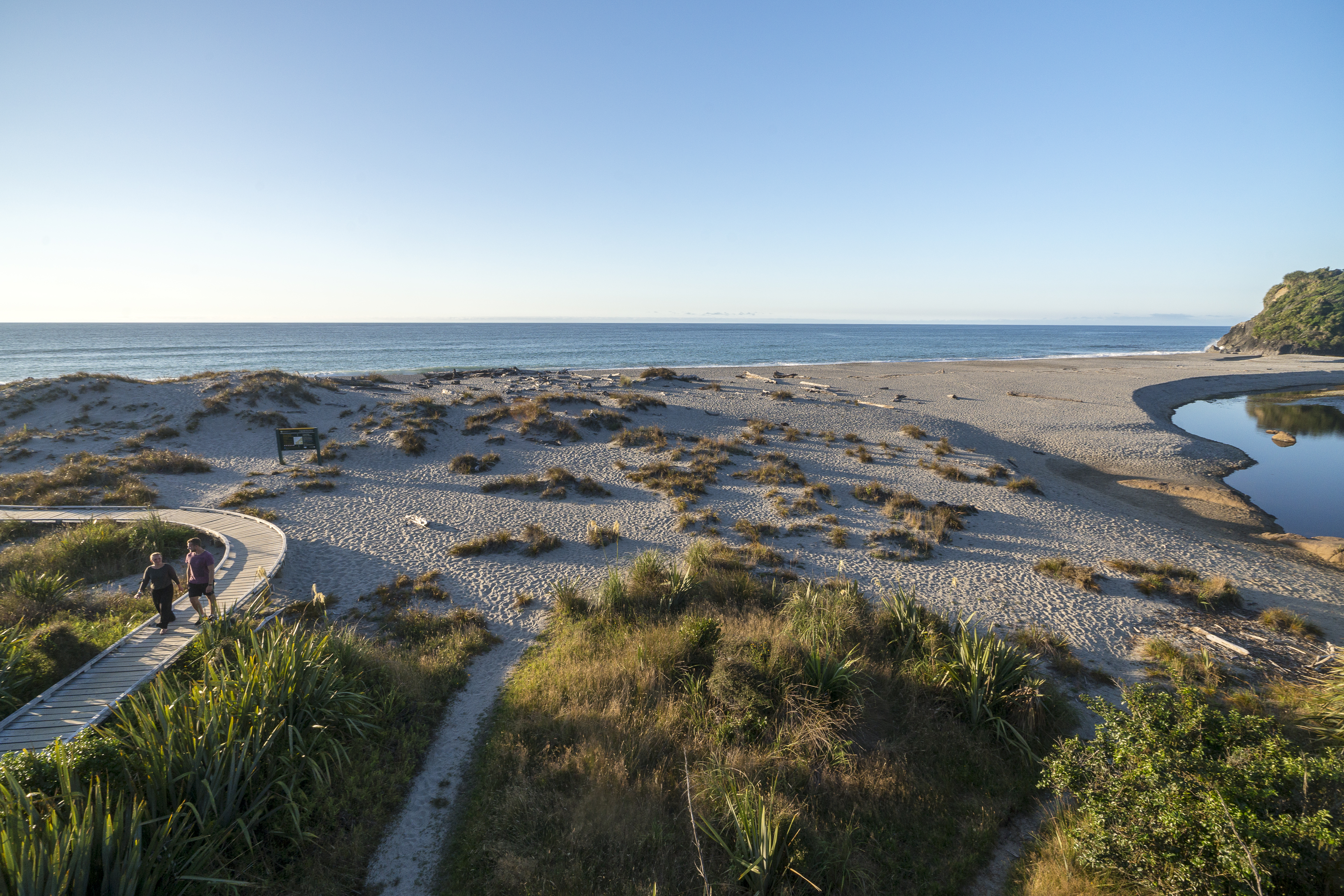
- Tauparikākā Marine Reserve from Ship Creek

- Location within South Island
- Location: Westland District, West Coast, New Zealand
- Coordinates: 43.7576552°S 169.1491093°E
- Area: 16 hectares (40 acres)
- Established: 2014
- Governing body: Department of Conservation

Tauparikākā Marine Reserve is a marine reserve located offshore about 20 kilometres (12 mi) north of Haast on the West Coast of New Zealand's South Island. It covers the area immediately offshore from Ship Creek, which is also known as Tauparikākā in Māori.

The marine reserve was established in 2014 and is administered by the Department of Conservation. It is New Zealand's smallest marine reserve, covering an area of just 16 hectares (40 acres).

== Geography ==
The reserve extends about 630 metres (2,070 ft) along the coastline from the Ship Creek Beach Walk north of Haast, and approximately 200 metres (660 ft) out from the shoreline. It adjoins the coastlines of Te Wahipounamu and Tauparikākā Mātaitai Reserve, and includes the Ship Creek tidal river mouth, lagoon and beach foreshore.

Tauparikākā includes natural examples of different habitat types: sandy beaches, the stream mouth of Ship Creek, and the shore habitats reaching out to a depth of about 5 metres (16 ft). Tutumairekurai (Hector’s dolphins) swim the shallow waves and seabirds like fairy prions and muttonbirds. The reserve area lies within the narrow inner shelf zone, inshore of deeply incised submarine canyons.

On shore from the reserve, there is an ancient kahikatea swamp forest and a dune lake, resembling how the West Coast landscape may have looked before human settlement.

== History ==
While the area is known as Tauparikākā in Māori, it gained the European name Ship Creek after fragments of the ship Schomberg were found at the creek between 1871 and 1875.

The marine reserve was established on 7 September 2014. It was created for educational rather than conservationist reasons, as a way for people to have easy viewing access to Hector’s dolphins.

== Recreation ==
The marine reserve is accessible via a carpark and walkway on State Highway 6 north of Haast. According to the Department of Conservation, the marine reserve includes a range of habitats in a small area, including one of the best places to see Hector's dolphins without a boat. It recommends insect repellent and advises against swimming.

Tauparikākā and Ship Creek is the starting point for walks around the nearby dune lake and swamp forest.

A range of activities are banned in the marine reserve, including fishing, taking or killing marine life, and moving or removing any marine life or materials. People must not feed fish as it disturbs their natural behaviour, and they must take care when anchoring to avoid damaging the sea floor.

Quad bikes and horses are allowed within the reserve, provided there is minimal disturbance to the site. Small stones, shells, driftwood, sand and gravel can be collected by hand. Pounamu (greenstone) can also be collected by Ngāi Tahu.

== See also ==
- Marine reserves of New Zealand
