= Mohammad Jafar al-Sadr =

Iraqi politician

- محمد جعفر الصدر

Permanent Representative of Iraq to the International Maritime Organization
- Incumbent
- Assumed office 15 February 2020
- Prime Minister: Adil Abdul-Mahdi; Mustafa al-Kadhimi; Mohammed Shia' Al Sudani

Ambassador of Iraq to the United Kingdom
- Incumbent
- Assumed office 4 October 2019
- Prime Minister: Adil Abdul-Mahdi; Mustafa al-Kadhimi; Mohammed Shia al-Sudani
- Preceded by: Salih al-Tamimi

Personal details
- Born: Mohammad Jafar Mohammad Baqir al-Sadr; September 7, 1970 (age 56) Najaf, Iraq
- Party: Non-partisan
- Education: Lebanese University
- Profession: Politician; Diplomat

Mohammad Jafar al-Sadr (Note: sometimes called Jafar al-Sadr) (born 1970 in Najaf, Iraq), is an Iraqi politician and diplomat currently serving as Iraq’s Permanent Representative to the International Maritime Organization and the Iraqi Ambassador to the United Kingdom. He is an independent politician.

== Early life ==
Al-Sadr is the only son and one of six children of Muhammad Baqir al-Sadr, an Iraqi Shia cleric who was imprisoned, tortured and then executed by the government of Saddam Hussein in 1980, after he published a defense of the Iranian Revolution. Muhammad Baqir al-Sadr is said to have been the ideological father of the Islamic Dawa Party.

Mohammad Jafar al-Sadr is the brother-in-law of Muqtada al-Sadr, who married his sister. He also has family ties to Mohammad Khatami, the former reformists President of Iran.

After the death of his father when he was eight, he moved to al-Kadhimiya in Baghdad where he went to school and studied law at Baghdad University. He then moved to Najaf, where he studied under his relative Grand Ayatollah Mohammed Sadeq al-Sadr. He moved to Qom, in Iran, in 1998 where he studied under Ayatollah Kazem al-Haeri; In 1998 he was arrested and his office closed down. He was put under house arrest and jailed for six months (sources differ on this). He moved to Beirut in 2006 where he obtained a degree in Sociology and Anthropology. He has two son and four daughters.

== Political life ==
He returned to Iraq after the invasion of Iraq and toppling of Saddam Hussein - sources differ as to whether this was in 2003 or 2009. He was elected in 2010 as a member of the Council of Representatives within Baghdad Province for the State of Law Coalition of Prime Minister Nouri al-Maliki. He said he refused to join the Islamic Dawa Party founded by his father because he disagreed with the Islamist ideology but liked Maliki's platform of non-sectarianism and the rule of law. He said that years of studying Islam had convinced him that religion and politics don't mix and that he disagreed with his brother-in-law Muqtader al-Sadr on the use of violence to achieve political goals. He declared that he doesn't believe in a religious or a secular state, but in a "civil state, which is the formula closest to the British and German model of dealing between state and beliefs". He said the invasion of Iraq was wrong even though Iraq was suffering from "an abhorrent dictatorship"; Iraqi people "needed help and understanding from the freedom-loving and anti-injustice peoples in the world and did not need an invasion and occupation".

He received 28,779 personal votes in the election, the second largest number of votes on this list after the Prime Minister. Following the election, he was touted as a potential prime minister. Whilst negotiations were on-going on the formation of a new government, the Sadrists conducted a "referendum" among Sadrist supporters on who should become the Prime Minister; Jaafar came second, receiving support from 23% of the 1.2 million people who voted.

He resigned from parliament in February 2011, to protest at the deterioration in services and the system of "patronage and cronyism".

Al-Sadr was again cited as a potential Prime Minister following the 2018 election, where the list headed by his brother-in-law, Muqtada al-Sadr, was the surprise winner with 54 seats. Veteran Shiite Arab politician Adil Abdul-Mahdi was eventually elected Prime Minister. He was appointed the Iraqi ambassador to the United Kingdom in 2019.

Following the 2021 election, he was again nominated to the Prime Ministership by the "Save the Homeland Alliance", which brought together three of the four largest parties - the Sadrist Movement, the Kurdistan Democratic Party the Sunni Arab majority Progress Party.
