= Samuel Lowder =

Royal Marines officer

General Samuel Lowder CB
- Born: 1813; Swindon, Wiltshire, England
- Died: 4 June 1891 (aged 79); Forest Hill, London, England
- Military career
- Allegiance: United Kingdom
- Branch: Royal Marines
- Rank: General
- Commands: Deputy Adjutant-General Royal Marines
- Conflicts: Crimean War; Second French intervention in Mexico
- Awards: Companion of the Order of the Bath

General Samuel Netterville Lowder, CB (1813 – 4 June 1891) was a Royal Marines officer who served as Deputy Adjutant-General Royal Marines.

== Military career ==
Lowder was commissioned into the Royal Marine Light Infantry. He commanded a unit of marines which secured the island of Kotka on the coast of Finland during the Crimean War and then commanded a battalion of marines providing support to French forces during the French intervention in Mexico in 1863. He became colonel second commandant of the Royal Marine Light Infantry in November 1864, colonel commandant of the Royal Marine Light Infantry in September 1866 and Deputy Adjutant-General Royal Marines (the professional head of the Royal Marines) in July 1867 before retiring in July 1872.

Military offices
Preceded by George Langley	Deputy Adjutant-General Royal Marines; 1867–1872	Succeeded by Sir George Schomberg
