= David Hannay (historian) =

English naval historian (1853–1934)

David McDowall Hannay (25 December 1853 – 29 May 1934) was an English naval historian.

Hannay was born in London. His father, James Hannay, had been in the Royal Navy, but later became a journalist and novelist. David Hannay was educated at Westminster School, and then joined his father, who was British consul in Barcelona, as vice-consul.

Over a period of years he wrote on naval topics in many journals and magazines. His first book was a monograph on Admiral Robert Blake, and he contributed several other works to various series of naval biographies. In addition, his interest in Spain led to a study of its literature and he became a recognized authority on Spanish affairs.

Hannay was an original member of the Navy Records Society on its formation in 1893, and due to his research efforts, and his lectures at the Royal Naval College, Greenwich, he became recognized as a leading scholar and historian on naval affairs. He contributed many articles to the 1911 Encyclopædia Britannica and a few to the Dictionary of National Biography. Through his influence as a journalist he helped form public and naval opinion on the need for an adequate naval fleet prior to World War I. He contributed articles to the Pall Mall Gazette, the Saturday Review of Politics, Literature, Science, and Art, and the St James's Gazette.

He was buried at Kensal Green Cemetery.

== Publications ==
- Admiral Blake (1886)
- Life of Tobias George Smollett (1887)
- Life of Frederick Marryat (1889)
- Rodney (1891) (George Bridges Rodney)
- Don Emilio Castelar (1896)
- The Later Renaissance (1898), from the series Periods of European Literature edited by George Saintsbury
- A Short History of the Royal Navy in 2 vols (vol. 1 (1898), vol. 2 (1907))
- Ships and Men (1910)
- The Sea Trader, His Friends and Enemies (1912)
- Naval Courts Martial (1914)
- Diaz (1917) (about Mexican President Porfirio Díaz)
- Spain (1917)
