= Thomas Monro (writer) =

English cleric and writer

Thomas Monro (1764–1815) was an English cleric and writer.

== Life ==
Son of the Rev. Thomas Monro of Wargrave, Berkshire, and nephew of Alexander Monro primus, he was born 9 October 1764, and was educated at Colchester free school and Norwich Grammar School under Samuel Parr. On 11 July 1782 he matriculated at St Mary Hall, Oxford, and in 1783 he was elected to a demyship at Magdalen College, which he resigned on his marriage, 7 June 1797. He graduated B.A. in 1787, and M.A. in 1791.

Monro was curate of Selborne, Hampshire, from 1798 until 1800, when he was presented by Lord Maynard to the rectory of Little Easton, Essex, where he died on 25 September 1815.

== Works ==
Monro's works were:

- Olla Podrida, a Periodical Work, comprising forty-eight weekly numbers, Oxford, 1787; 2nd edit. London, 1788; reprinted in Robert Lynam's edition of the British Essayists, vol. xxviii. (London, 1827). Monro set it up and ran it with the help of Oxford men: George Horne, Henry Headley, Henry Kett, Charles Gower, Philip Bracebridge Homer, and Alexander Crowcher Schomberg in particular.
- Essays on various Subjects, London, 1790.
- Alciphron's Epistles; in which are described the Domestic Manners, the Courtesans, and Parasites of Greece. Now first translated from the Greek, London, 1791, by Monro and William Beloe.
- Modern Britons, and Spring in London, London, 1792.
- Philoctetes in Lemnos. A Drama in three acts. To which is prefixed A Greenroom Scene, exhibiting a Sketch of the present Theatrical Taste: inscribed with due Deference to the Managers of Covent Garden and Drury Lane Theatres by their humble servant, Oxoniensis, London, 1795.

== Notes ==
Attribution

This article incorporates text from a publication now in the public domain: Lee, Sidney, ed. (1894). "Monro, Thomas (1764-1815)". Dictionary of National Biography. Vol. 38. London: Smith, Elder & Co.
