= John Davison (priest) =

English clergyman and academic

John Davison (1777–1834) was an English clergyman and academic, known as a theological writer.

== Life ==
He was born at Morpeth, where his father was a schoolmaster, but brought up in Durham. He was educated at Durham cathedral school, and in 1794 entered Christ Church, Oxford. There he obtained a Craven scholarship in 1796, and was elected Fellow of Oriel College in 1800. In 1810 he became one of the tutors of Oriel.

In 1817 Davison was presented by Lord Liverpool to the vicarage of Sutterton, near Boston, Lincolnshire. Subsequent preferment was to the rectory of Washington, Durham, in 1818, and in 1826 to that of Upton-upon-Severn. For a few years he held the prebend of Sneating in St Paul's Cathedral, and in 1826, on the recommendation of Lord Liverpool, he was made a prebendary of Worcester Cathedral.

Davison died 6 May 1834 at Cheltenham, where he had gone for his health. He was buried in the chancel of Worcester Cathedral.

== Views ==
In relation to the Oriel Noetics, Davison wrote in support of Edward Copleston's campaign for reform of Oxford teaching, but stood on the conservative side of the group. With Edward Hawkins he was chary of the liberal stance of some Noetics, in particular Richard Whately and Thomas Arnold; but (unlike Hawkins) he was sympathetic to the early moves of John Keble and the Tractarians of the "Oxford Movement". Along with Copleston he contributed to the "liberal Tory" strand of the debate on the poor laws. Davidson, with Coplestone and Whately, formed a group in the Noetics of political economists in the sense of Robert Malthus.

== Works ==
In theology Davison was a conservative. Finding radical and views on political questions in his parish, he opposed them in a tract, Dialogue between a Christian and a Reformer.

Davison's major work was his Warburtonian lectures on prophecy, published as Discourses on Prophecy, in which are considered its Structure, Use, and Inspiration. It stressed to the moral element, and the progressive character of prophetic revelations. An Inquiry into the Origin and Intent of Primitive Sacrifice, and the Scripture Evidence respecting it; with observations on the opinions of Spencer, Bishop Warburton, Archbishop Magee, and other writers on the same subject. And some reflections on the Unitarian Controversy (1825) had this commentary from the writer of the preface to Davison's Remains and Occasional Publications: "...sacrifices, eucharistical and penitentiary, might be, and probably were, of human origin, though presently sanctioned by divine approbation; but that the idea of expiatory sacrifice was clearly supernatural".

Davison was an occasional contributor to the Quarterly Review. Another of his publications was Considerations on the Poor Laws. He maintained that the law according relief to able-bodied poor should be gradually repealed. He felt that changes in law might become detrimental to the poor if too rapidly introduced. His proposal was that the law should cease to be operative in ten years, and that then a voluntary contribution should be made for cases of great need. Some Points on the Question of the Silk Trade stated, in a letter to George Canning, took a similar line, prompted by the collapse of the silk English industry. He also published sermons preached on public occasions.

Davison used the pseudonym "Phileleutheros Orielensis" in commenting on the Elements of General Knowledge (1802) of Henry Kett.
