= Robert Nares =

English clergyman, author and philologist (1753–1829)

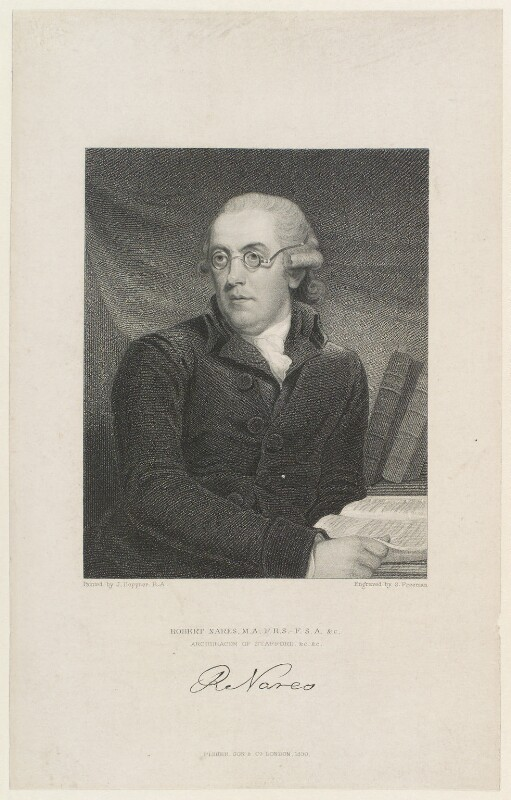
- Born: 9 June 1753
- Died: 23 March 1829 (aged 75)
- Alma mater: Christ Church
- Occupation: Writer, librarian, clergyman, editor, linguist, scholar of English, priest

Robert Nares (9 June 1753, York – 23 March 1829) was an English clergyman, philologist and author.

== Life ==
He was born at York in 1753, the son of James Nares (1715–1783), organist of York Minster and educated at Westminster School and Christ Church, Oxford.

From 1779 to 1783 he lived with the family of Sir Watkin Williams-Wynn, 4th Baronet as tutor to his sons Watkin and Charles, staying in London and at Wynnstay, Wrexham. In June 1782 he became vicar of Easton Maudit, Northamptonshire and in 1785 vicar of Great Doddington, Northamptonshire. From 1786 to 1788 he was Usher at Westminster School, again as tutor to the Williams-Wynn boys who had been sent there.

In 1787 he was appointed Chaplain to the Duke of York and in 1788 he was Assistant preacher at Lincoln's Inn. In 1795 he was appointed Assistant Librarian in the Department of Manuscript at the British Museum, and four years later was promoted to Keeper of Manuscripts. He became vicar of Dalbury, Derbyshire in 1796, rector of Sharnford, Canon Residentiary of Lichfield Cathedral and Prebendary of St Paul's Cathedral in 1798, Archdeacon of Stafford in 1801 and Vicar of St Mary's, Reading, from 1805 to 1818 and then of All Hallows, London Wall until his death in 1829.

He was elected a Fellow of the Royal Society in 1803. He was married three times but had no children.

== Works ==
In 1784 he published his first philological work, The Elements of Orthoepy. The work was highly commended by Boswell. There was a reissue of this book in 1792 with the revised title General Rules for the Pronunciation of the English Language. In 1793 he was founding editor of the British Critic with the assistance of his lifelong friend, Rev. William Beloe. In 1822 he published his principal work, Nares' Glossary, which was described in 1859, by Halliwell and Wright, as indispensable to readers of Elizabethan Literature. In 1819, Nares published The Veracity of the Evangelists Demonstrated: by a Comparative View of their Histories. His library was sold at auction by R. H. Evans in London on 25 November (and seven following days); a copy of the catalogue is held at Cambridge University Library (shelfmark Munby.c.137(4)).
