= Reginald Schomberg =

British Army officer and explorer

Reginald Charles Francis Schomberg (1880–1958) was a British Army officer and explorer, who served in Asia.

== Family and education ==
Schomberg was the son of Reginald Brodrick Schomberg (1848–1932) and Frances Sophia Schomberg (1839–1922), and a descendant of the physician Meyer Low Schomberg (1690–1761). He was educated at The Oratory School in Edgbaston, Birmingham (1892–8), then New College, Oxford, where he graduated in 1901.

== Military and diplomatic career ==
Schomberg served mainly in Asia. His military career took him to India (1902–11), he served in the Malay States Guides (early 1910s). He went to the Mesopotamia campaign (1915) and the Sinai and Palestine campaign (1917), Malaya (1919), India (1922), and Ladakh (1923). He retired in 1927.

He also held several diplomatic posts. He was British consul-general in French establishments in India (1936–37, 1938–41); and consul-general for Portuguese India (from 1939). He was consular liaison officer, Persia (1942–3), and customs officer, Perso-Indian frontier (1943–4). From 1944 to 1945 he was colonel in Force 136 (part of the Special Operations Executive), China.

== Travels ==
He made several journeys in Central Asia, in 1926, 1927–29 and 1930–31, Baltistan (1937), and Ladakh (1944, 1945, 1946).

== Awards and honours ==
- Distinguished Service Order (DSO) and bar
- Royal Geographical Society's Gill memorial medal
- Companion of the Order of the Indian Empire (C.I.E.) 1937

== Publications ==
- 1933 Peaks and Plains of Central Asia
- 1935 Between the Oxus and the Indus
- 1936 Unknown Karakorum
- 1938 Kafirs and Glaciers

He also wrote articles and reviews for the Alpine Journal, the Geographical Journal, the Himalayan Journal, the Journal of the Royal Central Asian Society, and the Scottish Geographical Journal.

== Religious life ==
From 1947 to 1951, Schomberg studied for the priesthood in Rome, and subsequently worked in England: at Ringwood, Hampshire (1952–53), the Assisi Home, Grayshott (1953–54), and the Sisters of St Joseph, Boars Hill, Oxford (1954–57). He was buried at Belmont Abbey, Herefordshire.

== See also ==
- Rosie Llewellyn-Jones (2018) "Letters from the RSAA Archive: Sir Aurel Stein, Colonel Reginald Schomberg and a secret mission to Central Asia", Asian Affairs, 49:3, 492–506.
