= Miss Ironside's School =

School in London, United Kingdom

Coordinates: 51.4978°N 0.1829°W

Miss Ironside's School (also called Miss Ironside's Day School and Miss Ironside's School For Girls) was a school at 2 Elvaston Place, in Kensington. The journalist John Walsh, writing in The Daily Telegraph, called it "legendary".

It was founded in 1920 by Miss Irene Ironside, the aunt of artists Robin and Christopher Ironside. During World War II the school was evacuated to Little Ridge House (later renamed Fonthill House) near to the village of Fonthill Bishop in Wiltshire. Ironside had a kindergarten or nursery at the site that was notable for its attendance of the "scions of many of the most illustrious families", including Nazi collaborator John Amery, whom she described as "unteachable".

Notable alumnae included:

- Salimah Aga Khan (née Sarah Frances Croker Poole), former fashion model and an ex-wife of the IV Aga Khan Prince Karim Aga Khan
- Jane Birkin, singer and actor
- Sheila and Ellen-Craig Crosland, daughters of Susan Crosland, journalist, and step-daughters of Tony Crosland, Labour Education Minister who started the comprehensive school movement in the UK
- Rose Dugdale, a militant in the Irish republican organisation and the Provisional Irish Republican Army (IRA)
- Jane Fawcett, a World War II codebreaker, singer, and heritage preservationist
- Teresa Hayter, writer and activist
- Sarah Hogg, Viscountess Hailsham (née Boyd-Carpenter), economist, journalist, and politician
- Virginia Ironside, journalist, agony aunt and writer, whose great-aunt was headmistress
- Tracy Reed, actor
- Jan Struther, writer
- John Amery, British fascist and Nazi collaborator
