= Elvaston Place =

Street in South Kensington, London

Coordinates: 51.49727°N 0.18218°W

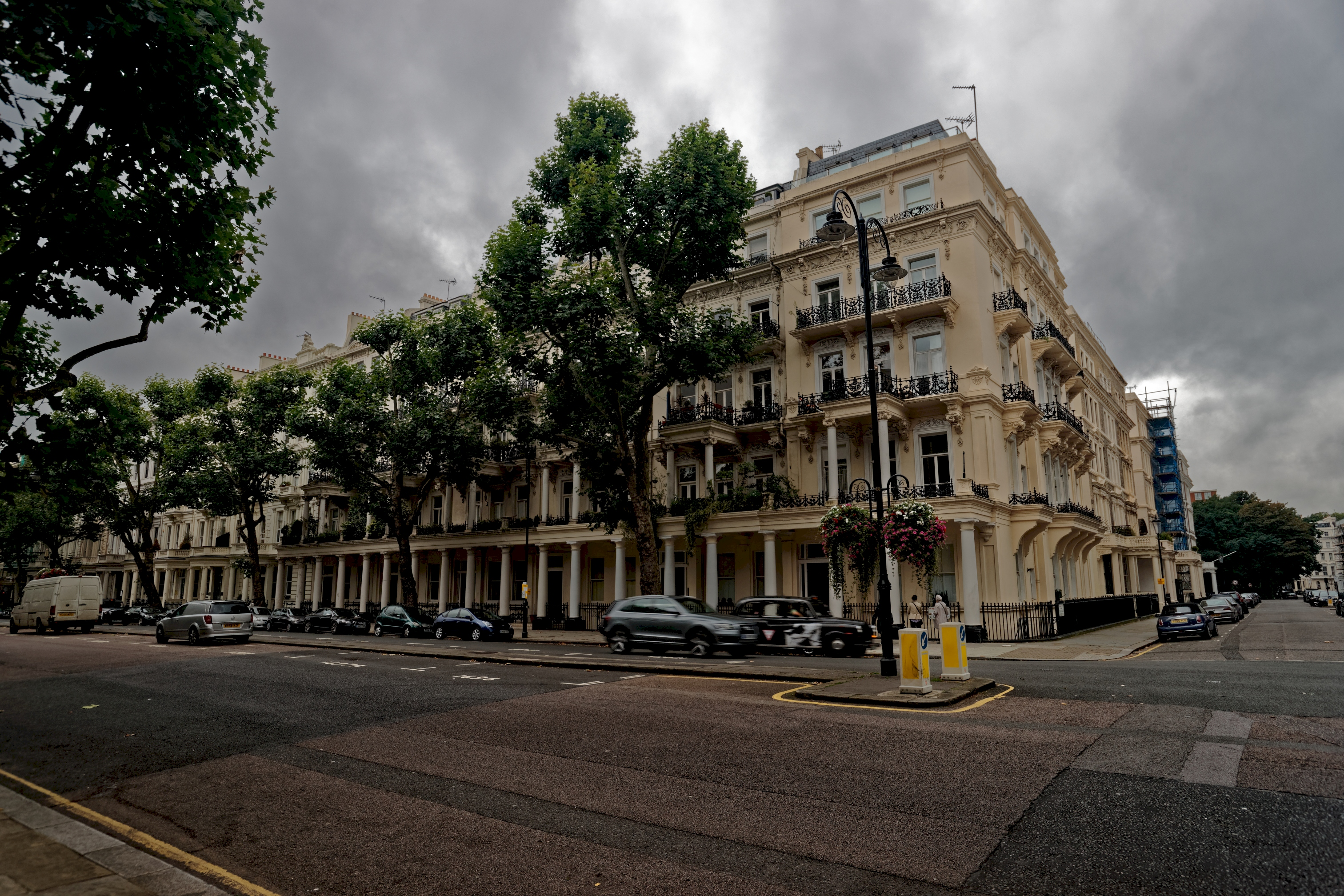
- Elvaston Place in 2010

- Location within Greater London
- Part of: South Kensington
- Type: Street
- Length: 300 m (980 ft)
- Location: South Kensington, London
- West end: Gloucester Road
- East end: Queen's Gate

Elvaston Place is a street in South Kensington, London.

Elvaston Place runs west to east from Gloucester Road to Queen's Gate.

The High Commission of Gabon, London, is at number 27. The High Commission of Mauritius, London, is at number 32/33. The Embassy of Iraq, London, has its consular section at number 3.

== History ==
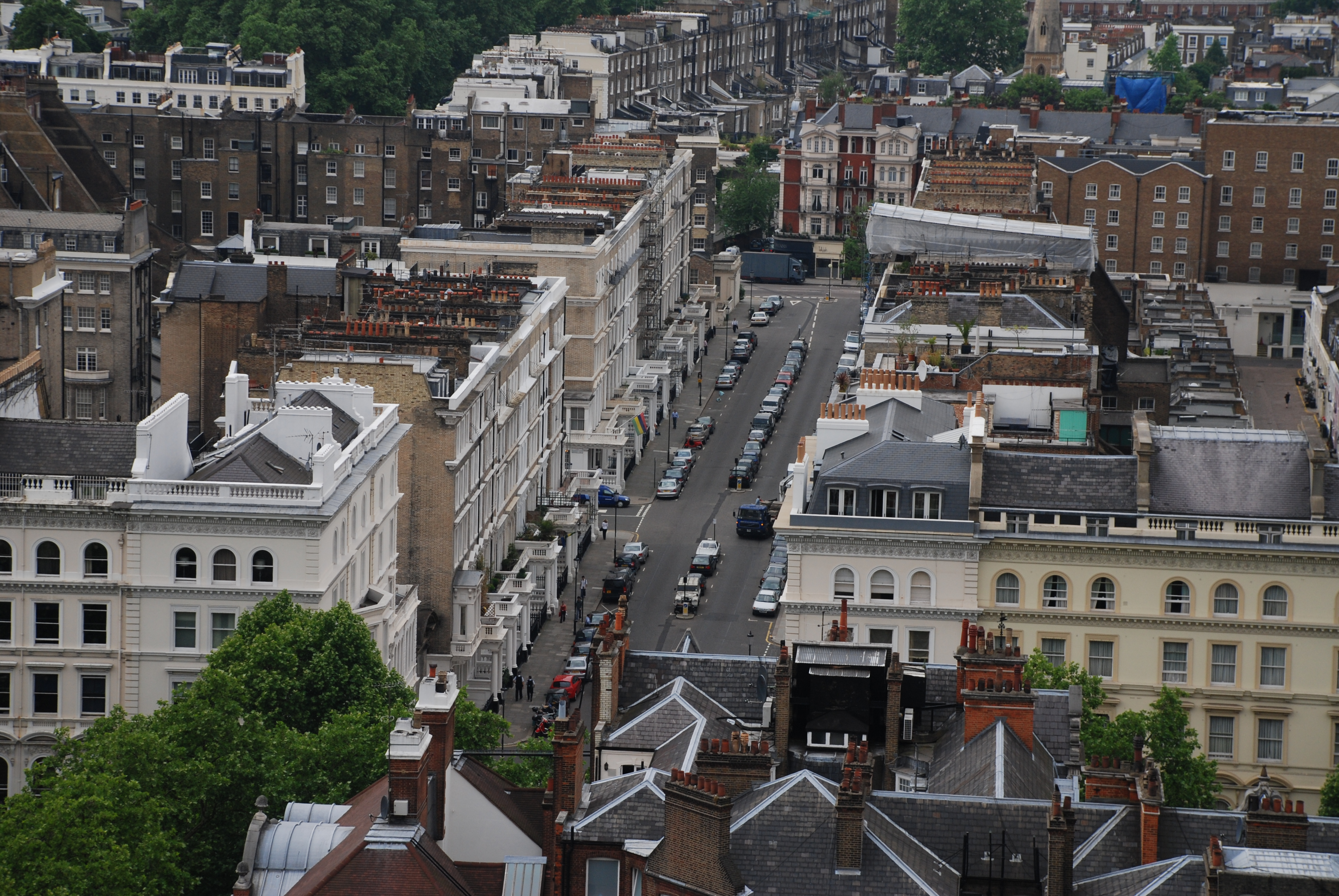
Elvaston Place from Queens Tower in 2007

Much of the street, 1-20 and 32–46, was built by the property developer Charles Aldin in the early 1860s. 26-31 were built in 1866–68.

Miss Ironside's School was located at number 2.

== Notable residents ==
- In 1868, John Crawfurd, Scottish physician, colonial administrator, diplomat, and author, died at his home in the street.
- From 1872 to his death in 1897, Liberal MP and Cabinet Minister Rt Hon A J Mundella lived at number 16.
- In 1882, William Bence Jones, an Anglo-Irish agriculturist, died at his home in the street.
- In 1884, General Sir David Russell died at his home in the street.
- Until his death in 1894, General Sir Patrick MacDougall lived at number 22.
- In 1895, Lieutenant General George Brydges Rodney died at his home in Elvaston Place.
- In 1905, the artist Edward Burra was born there at his grandmother's house.
- In 1920, William Plunket, 5th Baron Plunket died at his home at number 40.
- In the late 1930s, Geoffrey Wilkinson, the Nobel laureate English chemist, rented a room at number 4.
- In 1941, the actor S. J. Warmington, who lived at number 39, died when his neighbourhood was showered with incendiary bombs after he went out to help extinguish fires and was killed when a high-explosive bomb fell.
- In 1945, the actor Michael Hordern and his wife, Eve Mortimer, lived in a rented flat.
- In 1945 T.S. Eliot rented a bedsitting room on the 2nd floor of 14 Elvaston Place, S. Kensington
- From 1 January 1968 until at least May 1969, the musician Al Stewart lived in a basement flat at number 10, and his song Elvaston Place is about his time there.
