= Schomberg (ship) =

1855 Scottish-built clipper ship

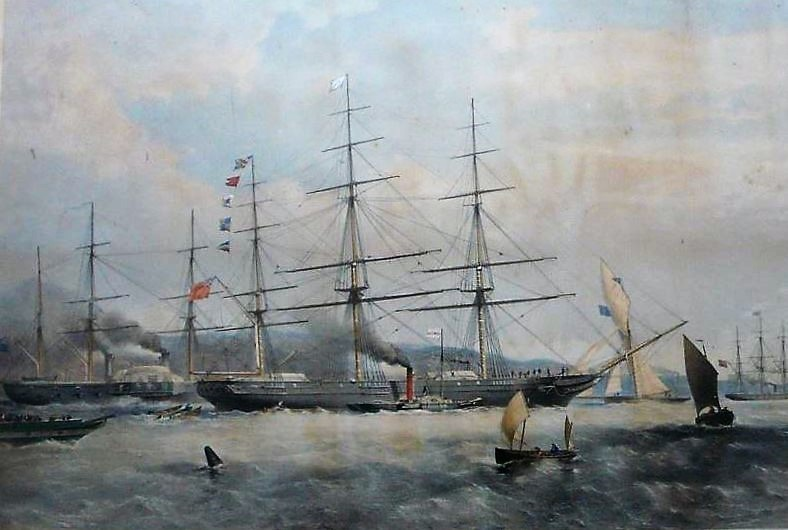
- The Schomberg departs Liverpool on her maiden voyage in 1855

History

United Kingdom
- Name: Schomberg
- Builder: Alexander Hall, Aberdeen
- Launched: 1855
- In service: 7 April 1855
- Out of service: 27 December 1855
- Fate: Wrecked

General characteristics
- Sail plan: Full-rigged ship

The full-rigged Schomberg was a clipper built in 1855 at Aberdeen by Alexander Hall & Co. for the Black Ball Line (which was a subsidiary of James Baines & Co., of Liverpool) for carrying large cargoes and steerage passengers, and to "outdo the Americans". Hall's were the leading clipper shipbuilder in Britain and she was regarded as the most luxurious and well-built clipper of the period.

She was named after Captain Charles Frederick Schomberg R N., the Emigration Commissioner for Liverpool, an influential man when it came to securing government contracts for the carriage of emigrants. The Black Ball Line's owners clearly sought his favour. She was launched in Aberdeen, Scotland, on 7 April 1855, and christened by A. H. Layard M.P.

She was sunk on her maiden voyage in 1855 on the Shipwreck Coast of Victoria, Australia.

== Construction ==
She was 2600 tons, 288 feet long, 45 feet broad, 29.2 feet deep. The Encyclopædia Britannica tell us "The frames of the vessel were of British Oak, and the planking consisted of four layers of Scotch Larch, each 2 inches thick. The first two layers were fixed in a diagonal position, passing down one side of the vessel and up the other, beneath the inside keel. The third layer was put on in a perpendicular position, and also passed under the vessel; and over this the outer layer was fixed horizontally. By arranging the planking in the way described, great strength was obtained." She was built to carry 1000 passengers. The vessel cost £43,103.

However, The book "Famous Wrecks" by Jack Loney (Marine History Publications, Geelong Australia) conversely states that the hull was constructed with three skins - one fore & aft, plus two diagonal and fastened with screw-threaded trunnels.

She was described as very "sharp forward", with a long clean run, and "considerable dead rise" at her midship section. She was heavily sparred, with single topsail yards, and three skysails.

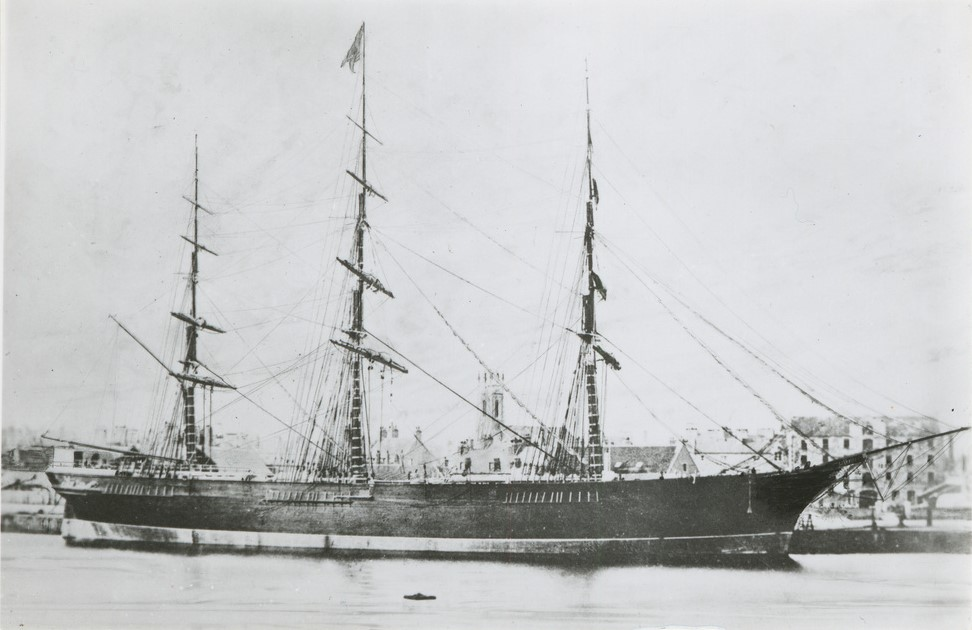
Schomberg newly launched in Aberdeen

It was believed that for speed she could outdo her American rivals.

== Captain ==
Captain James Nicol "Bully" Forbes, an Aberdeen man, of great reputation, who had become famous at the helm of the Marco Polo and Lightning, was appointed to command her. Forbes was supposedly the man who gave birth to the phrase "Hell or Melbourne." He was the holder of a record 68 day run from Liverpool to Melbourne.

== Maiden voyage ==
She sailed from Liverpool on 6 October 1855 carrying 430 passengers, and a large cargo for the Geelong and Melbourne Railway Company. A "patriotic, cheering crowd" turned out to see her off. As she was towed down the Mersey, her signals read "Sixty days to Melbourne" fluttering gaily from her mizzen truck. A tune, The Schomberg Galop, was written by Charles D'Albert to mark the launch of the ship. The score is dedicated to Mrs. Charles Schomberg.

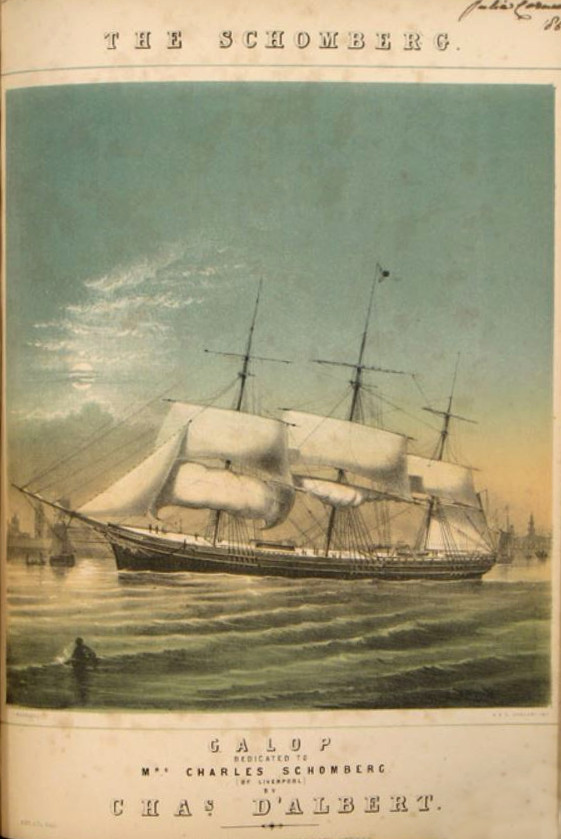
A sheet music cover

In a letter to the S.A. Register it was said "The vessel, with the provisions for the voyage out and home, cost £60,000, and, I understand is not fully insured. The freight list amounts to £35,000. She is without exception the noblest piece of naval architecture I ever looked upon." At first on her maiden voyage, she enjoyed moderate winds to the equator which she crossed in 28 days, and then drifted into calms and light airs for fourteen days, from which she did not have the nimble speed to extricate herself. On the voyage her best day while running her easting down was 368 miles. From the Greenwich meridian in 19 days, she proceeded at an average of 423 miles per day. On Christmas Day she sighted Cape Bridgewater, then 81 days out she was wrecked on 27 December 1855 passing the Victorian coast. She was nearing the end of her voyage, close inshore off Cape Otway at Curdies Inlet (now called Schomberg Reef), east of Peterborough and 150 miles westward of Melbourne. When the wind suddenly dropped the ship drifted onto an uncharted reef and became stuck fast. There was no loss of life: all the passengers, crew and mails were taken off by a passing coastal steamer, the Queen, out of Port Fairy the following morning, and taken to Port Phillip. Her mail was redirected from Sydney on 31 September.

Attempts to refloat her were unsuccessful, and she eventually broke up on 6 January 1856.

As a result of the incident, her captain James "Bully" Forbes was charged with gross negligence and wrecking her. It was said that he had been below deck playing cards with two ladies, one Miss Hart, an 18-year-old passenger. According to Lubbock, "when the mate came down and reported that the ship was getting rather close in under the land and suggested going about. As luck would have it, Forbes was losing and, being a bit out of temper, insisted on playing another rubber of whist before tacking ship, and the danger point had been overstripped when at 11 o'clock he came on deck and gave the order to 'bout ship."

The Melbourne court heard that she was aiming for a record-breaking 60-day run to Melbourne but was well behind schedule. She was a very heavy ship carrying railway iron, railway carriages, etc., and the trip was proving rather slow. The Captain was cleared, as the sandbank was uncharted and there was "not enough evidence to show he had not used every precaution necessary to save his ship"; public outrage ensued.

== Meeting of passengers ==
At a mass meeting of the passengers, held in Melbourne at the Mechanics' Institute, on 3 February 1856, Forbes was severely censured and some went so far as to suggest that he was so disgusted at the slowness of the passage that he let the ship go ashore on purpose. When Forbes was told that she was hard aground he is reported to have said "Let her go to hell" and immediately went below. Henry Keen, the mate then took charge, clewed up the sails, dropped the anchor and lowered the boats. It was mainly due to the mate and a first-class passenger that all passengers were safely disembarked and put aboard the Queen. "The following resolutions were unanimously carried:

- 1st. That the conduct of the captain, the surgeon and some of the officers of the Schomberg was ungentlemanly, discourteous and grossly immoral.
- 2nd. That it was not only the general impression of the passengers of the Schomberg, but to the certain knowledge of many of those here assembled, that the loss of that fine ship can only be attributed to the gross negligence of the captain.
- 3rd. That we are of opinion that the contracts entered into between Messrs. James Baines & Co., of Liverpool, and the passengers of the Schomberg have not been fulfilled.
- 4th. That a deputation be appointed to wait upon His Excellency the Office Administering the Government, praying that an investigation be held into the circumstances of the loss of the Schomberg, and the property of the passengers."

Forbes' career was in ruins; it was to be his last command of a fast sailing clipper. He was not to obtain another command with the Black Ball line and he sank into obscurity. He stayed in Australia for a while, obtaining command of the Hastings in 1857, but lost her in 1859, and for a while was regularly "on the beach" in Calcutta. In 1862 he reappeared in Scotland as agent for the owners of the Earl of Derby and in 1864 was in Hong Kong in command of the General Wyndham. He was described then as "a seedy broken-down looking skipper". He commanded this ship until 1866 and that was the end of his sea-going career. On 4 June 1874 he died at the age of 52 in Liverpool and was buried in Smithdown Road Cemetery.

The stern went down in 10 metres of water off the reef, but the Christchurch (New Zealand) newspaper The Sun on 15 March 1975 published an article reporting that the remains of a major portion of the bow upperworks (the hull above the load waterline) had washed up on the West Coast of New Zealand, near Tuperikaka Creek in the South Island. The remains had broken free from the bottom of the ship and as a partially submerged wreck drifted 2414 km across the Tasman Sea.

It also appears that a large "broadside" section of the vessel drifted to Anderson's Inlet near the present township of Inverloch. George Leggett accounts for his father Captain Richard Leggett's efforts to salvage the barque Amazon in Anderson's Inlet in December 1863. He notes that a large portion of the Schomberg was used as a platform to mount a capstan and derrick for the salvage operation. Coastal erosion has revealed significant evidence of the Amazon wreck since 2016 which raises the possibility that some of this material may in fact be from the Schomberg.

== Salvage ==
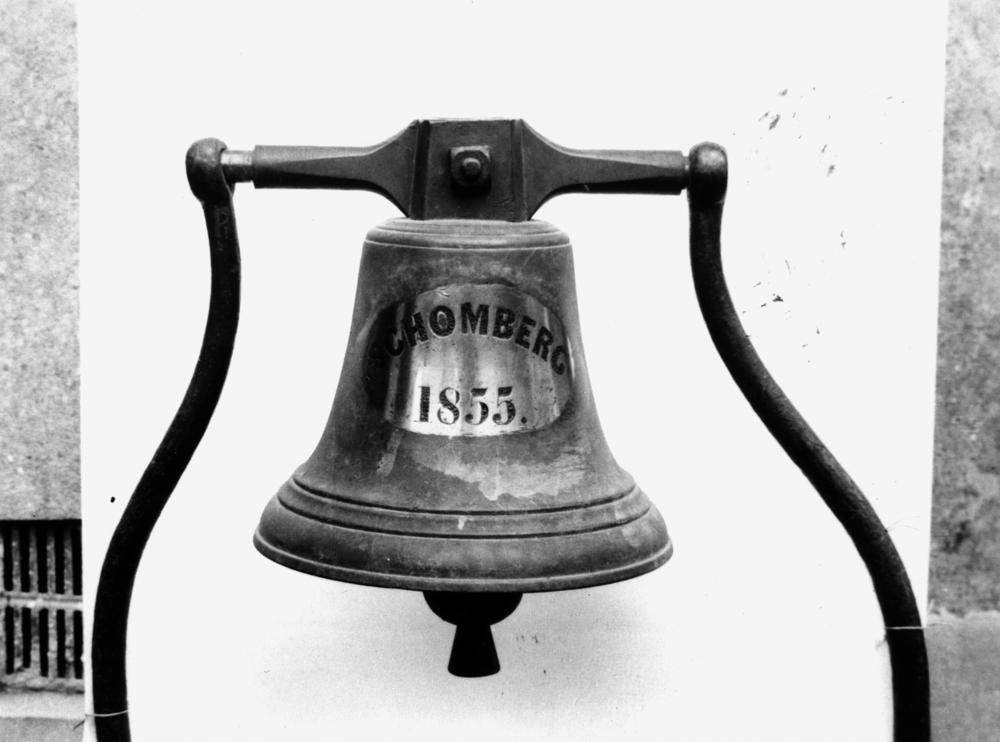
Bell of the ship Schomberg

The passengers' luggage and some of the cargo was rescued, but the weather worsened and work was abandoned. Cargo littered the beach and the police patrolled the area for looters. The wreck was sold for salvage to local merchants: two were drowned in attempts to reach her. It became a popular wreck site for diving and over 100 relics have been handed in.

The bell of the ship is in the Warrnambool Museum, southern Victoria. Relics at Flagstaff Hill Maritime Museum include a cannon, a communion set, a brass candlestick, and a diamond ring.

== Song ==
In addition to the tune The Schomberg Galop, written for the launch (see above), in 2020 Bruce Watson (songwriter) wrote the song The Wreck of the Schomberg which tells the story of the ship's construction, voyage and wrecking.
