= William Sherlock (painter) =

Irish artist

- Born: 1738; Dublin
- Died: 14 December 1806 (aged 67–68)
- Occupations: Portrait painter and engraver
- Children: William Pengree Sherlock

William Sherlock (circa 1738–14 December 1806) was an Irish portrait painter and engraver.

== Life ==
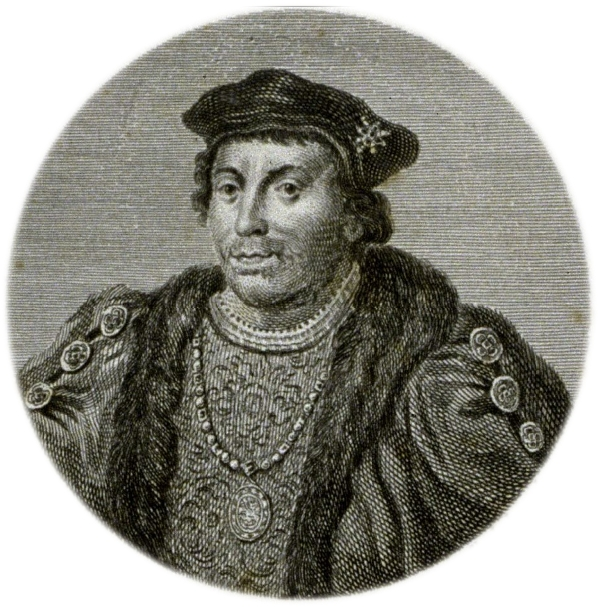
Sherlock's portrait of Henry Stafford

Sherlock is said to have been the son of a prize-fighter and fencing master, and to have been born at Dublin around 1738, though Walter G. Strickland suggests he was born earlier. His aunt is thought to have kept the "Highlander" Tavern in Ringsend. In 1759 he was a student in the St. Martin's Lane academy in London, and in that year obtained a premium from the Society of Arts and again in 1760 for engraving. He at first studied engraving, and was a pupil of J. P. Le Bas at Paris. There he engraved a large plate of ‘The Grange,’ after Jean-Baptiste Pillement, published in 1761; he also engraved the portrait heads for Tobias Smollett's A Complete History of England in four volumes.

Sherlock took to painting portraits on a small scale, both in oil and watercolours, and miniatures from 1764. He was a fellow of the Incorporated Society of Artists in 1771, and their director in 1774, exhibiting with them from 1764 to 1777. From 1802 to 1806 he exhibited small portraits at the Royal Academy. He also practised as a picture-cleaner, and was a skilled copyist.

He married Frances Welker at the Old Church, St Pancras, London on 5 October 1775. On 21 February 1799, Joseph Farington commented in his diary that "Sherlock quite broke down sold out of funds", and he later noted Sherlock's death on 14 December 1806 in London. Farington oversaw donation to a Mrs Sherlock from the Royal Academy from 1813 to 1821. Sherlock's son, William Pengree Sherlock, was born in 1775 was also an artist.

The National Portrait Gallery hold his Portrait of Sawrey Gilpin, and the Victoria and Albert Museum hold three of his miniatures.
