= Alexander Wilmot Schomberg =

Royal Navy Admiral (1774–1850)

Admiral Alexander Wilmot Schomberg
- Born: 24 February 1774
- Died: 13 January 1850 (aged 75); Bognor, Sussex
- Relatives: Alexander Schomberg (father); Charles Marsh Schomberg (brother)
- Military career
- Allegiance: Great Britain; United Kingdom
- Branch: Royal Navy
- Service years: 1785–1850
- Rank: Admiral
- Commands: HMS Rambler; HMS Windsor Castle; HMS Apollo; HMS Loire; HMS Dictator; HMS York; HMS Melville
- Conflicts: French Revolutionary Wars; Invasion of Martinique; Invasion of Saint Lucia; Invasion of Guadeloupe; Napoleonic Wars; Invasion of Guadeloupe; Gunboat War

Admiral Alexander Wilmot Schomberg (24 February 1774 – 13 January 1850) was an officer of the British Royal Navy who served during the French Revolutionary and Napoleonic Wars.

== Biography ==
=== Family background ===
Schomberg was the grandson of Dr. Meyer Löw Schomberg, a practicing Jew who settled in London in 1720. Meyer's son, also named Alexander, converted to the Church of England, a requirement of the Test Act, to enter the Royal Navy Vol. 15 (1939-1945), pp. 1–28 (28 pages) . Alexander Wilmot Schomberg was the second son of Captain Sir Alexander Schomberg and Mary Susannah Arabella, the only child of the Reverend Henry Chalmers, and niece of Sir Edmund Aleyn. His brother was Captain Sir Charles Marsh Schomberg.

=== Early naval career ===
He entered the Navy in April 1785 as a first-class volunteer aboard Dorset, the official yacht of the Lord Lieutenant of Ireland, commanded by his father in the Irish Sea. He later served as a midshipman aboard Porcupine, under the command of Captain Lambert Brabazon, for about 2 1/2 years, before joining the 98-gun Impregnable, flagship of Sir Richard Bickerton at Plymouth, late in 1789. He went on to serve aboard the frigate Lowestoffe, Captain Edmund Dodd, attached to the Channel Fleet, and then in the 50-gun Trusty, flagship of Sir John Laforey on the West Indies Station. There he was promoted to lieutenant on 26 July 1793, to serve aboard the sloop Nautilus, Captain Lord Henry Paulet, and then the frigate Solebay, Captain William Hancock Kelly.

In Solebay he commanded 50 men of the Naval Brigade, part of the forces commanded by Sir Charles Grey, during the operations against Martinique, Saint Lucia, and Guadeloupe in 1794. He also took part in the unsuccessful attempt recapture Guadeloupe, which had been unexpectedly and successfully re-taken by French Republican forces under Victor Hugues. Schomberg served for a short time in Boyne, the flagship of Sir John Jervis. However, at the end of the year, having suffered a severe attack of yellow fever, he was sent home to recuperate.

On 22 June 1795 Schomberg was appointed to the 56-gun Glatton, Captain Henry Trollope, stationed in the North Sea. As an experiment, she was armed with only carronades, twenty-eight 32-pounders on the upper deck and twenty-eight 68-pounder carronades on the lower, giving her a distinct advantage in weight of metal against ships armed with standard 32- and 28-pounders in a close action. This was demonstrated on 15 July 1796 when Glatton fought a French squadron of four frigates, two ship-corvettes, a large brig-corvette and an armed cutter off the coast of Flanders. In a short but violent confrontation Glatton attacked the French squadron just before nightfall, her heavy guns doing great damage to the enemy, though she was severely cut up in her sails, rigging and masts. After spending the night making repairs, Glatton sought out the enemy, but they declined a renewal of the engagement, and sailed for Flushing. The French ships were believed to be the razee Brutus, and the frigates Incorruptible, Magicienne and Républicaine. It was reported that they had suffered considerable damage, and one sank in the harbour. During the action, Schomberg, commanding the lower deck, found that he did not have enough men to fight all the guns on both sides, so resorted to forming them into gangs, who loaded and ran the guns out, then moved on to the next gun, while two men pointed and fired. Schomberg was commended for his conduct, and on 28 July was appointed first lieutenant of the frigate Amphion. Unfortunately, the ship was destroyed by an explosion while moored at Plymouth Dock while he was travelling to join her, and it was not until January 1796 that he received command of the 14-gun brig Rambler, in which he served on the coasts of Holland and Norway, at Newfoundland, off Cherbourg, and on the Guernsey and Jersey stations. He was promoted to commander on 2 April 1798, but remained in Rambler until 1 January 1801, when he was promoted to post-captain.

=== Post-captain ===
In 1804 he held temporary command of the 98-gun Windsor Castle off Brest. He commanded the frigate Apollo from October 1806, and on 31 October 1807 he was appointed to command of the frigate Loire. In early 1808 Loire and the frigate Success, Captain John Ayscough, sailed to the seas around Greenland on fishery protection duties, venturing as far north as 77° 30' N. At the end of the same year, accompanied by Amelia and Champion, he escorted a convoy of 168 transport ships, carrying 14,000 troops, from Falmouth to Corunna. He then co-operated with Spanish partisans on the coasts of Galicia, Asturias, and Biscay, brought 100 Russian prisoners-of-war from the Tagus to England, and on 5 February 1809 captured the French ship Hebe (which later served as HMS Ganymede). Early in 1810 he transported a battalion of the 60th Regiment from England to Barbados; and during the siege of Guadeloupe, he commanded a squadron stationed to intercept enemy vessels. He returned to England with the French Captain-General Jean Augustin Ernouf and his suite on board, surviving a hurricane which sank two transports full of prisoners. He then proceeded to the coast of Norway, where he saved the sloop Snake from an attack from eight Danish brigs. Until 1812 Schomberg was chiefly employed in command of a light squadron in the Baltic. He once escorted an outward-bound West India convoy as far as Madeira; and in December 1810 narrowly escaped disaster being in company with Minotaur, shortly before she was wrecked.

On 21 March 1812 he was appointed to command of Dictator, and on 13 August to the 74-gun York. He took part in the blockade of Rochefort and L'Orient, and in 1814, with the 74-gun Vengeur and 20-gun Erne, transported troops from Bordeaux to Quebec, somehow managing to cram no less than 1,000 men on board each 74 in addition to their usual complements. York was paid off in August 1815.

At the end of the war Schomberg made several suggestions to improve the victualling the seamen and marines, some of which were eventually adopted several years later. One of these was to substitute tea for half the usual ration of spirits. In 1818 he privately circulated a paper Naval Suggestions, outlining his ideas; and in 1832 published his Practical Hints on Building, Rigging, Arming, and Equipping His Majesty's Ships-of-War, &c.

=== Post-war career ===
Schomberg remained unemployed until on 1 March 1829 he was appointed to the 74-gun Melville. He commanded her in the Mediterranean until promoted to rear admiral on 22 July 1830. On 23 November 1841 he was promoted to vice admiral, and to admiral on 9 October 1849.

Admiral Schomberg died at Bognor, Sussex, on 13 January 1850.

== Personal life ==
Schomberg was twice married, firstly to Catherine Anna, only daughter of Stepney Rawson Stepney, of Durrow, Ireland, by whom he had one son, Herbert Schomberg, who became a naval officer and eventually attained the rank of rear admiral; and secondly on 1 October 1804, to Anne, the youngest daughter of Rear-Admiral Richard Smith of Poulton-cum-Seacombe, by whom he had two further sons; Charles Frederick Schomberg, who became a vice admiral, and George Augustus Schomberg who became an officer in the Royal Marine Artillery.
