= William Beloe =

English divine and miscellaneous writer

William Beloe (1756 – April 11, 1817) was an English divine and miscellaneous writer.

== Biography ==
Beloe was born at Norwich the son of a tradesman, and received a liberal education. After a day school in Norwich he was schooled under the Rev. Matthew Raine, who taught at Hartforth; and subsequently under Samuel Parr, whom he describes as "severe, wayward, and irregular". His departure from Parr's school at Stanmore was hastened by quarrels with his schoolfellows, and at Benet College, Cambridge he got into trouble by writing epigrams. Parr, on becoming headmaster of Norwich grammar school, offered him the assistant mastership. Beloe held this post for three years, but seemingly unhappily.

During his time at Norwich Beloe married, and then went to London, where he worked for publishers. In 1793 he established, with Robert Nares, the British Critic, the first forty-two volumes of which were partly edited by him. He also, according to his biographer in the Gentleman's Magazine, "gave his assistance in editing various books of considerable popularity and importance, which it is less expedient to specify", doubtless because the reputed authors' obligations to him were too extensive.

In 1796 Beloe was presented to the rectory of Allhallows, London Wall, and in 1803 became keeper of printed books at the British Museum. Being held responsible for thefts by a person named Dighton, he was dismissed from the Museum in 1806. His library, of 582 lots of 'theology, classics, philology, voyages, travels, and miscellaneous books' was sold in London by R. H. Evans on 19 June 1817 and two following days. A copy of the catalogue is at Cambridge University Library (shelfmark Munby.c.119[3]). He died on 11 April 1817, embittered by ill-health and other circumstances not precisely stated.

== Works ==
One of Beloe's publisher commissions was to translate Samuel Parr's preface to Bellendenus into English, a piece of work that impressed Richard Porson. He successively brought out translations of Coluthus, Alciphron (with Thomas Monro), Herodotus, and Aulus Gellius (preface by Parr); and co-operated in William Tooke's Biographical Dictionary. He published (1795) three volumes of miscellanies.

Beloe persevered in his Anecdotes of Literature and Scarce Books, started with his appointment at the British Museum. Two volumes appeared in 1806; and by the assistance of Earl Spencer, the Bishop of Ely, and other patrons, he published four more, the last appearing in 1812. The work was supported by the advice of Isaac Reed.

The Sexagenarian, or Recollections of a Literary Life, Beloe's final work, had just passed the press at the time of his death, and was published immediately afterwards under the editorship of Thomas Rennell. It caused a furore. Dr. Butler, head master of Shrewsbury School, criticised it severely in the Monthly Review, and Parr, in the catalogue of his library, wrote he was "compelled to record the name of Beloe as an ingrate and a slanderer". Via Robert Southey's library, a key was published in 1860 to some of those alluded to indirectly in the book.

== Family ==
In 1780 Beloe married in Norwich Mary Anne Rix, daughter of William Rix of London. Of their children, four sons survived him, and a daughter Margaret, who married a William. Margaret Louisa Harriet Beloe who married William Scott was a granddaughter, son of William Beloe, and mother of Clement William Scott the theatre critic.
