= Isaac Schomberg (physician) =

German physician (1714–1780)

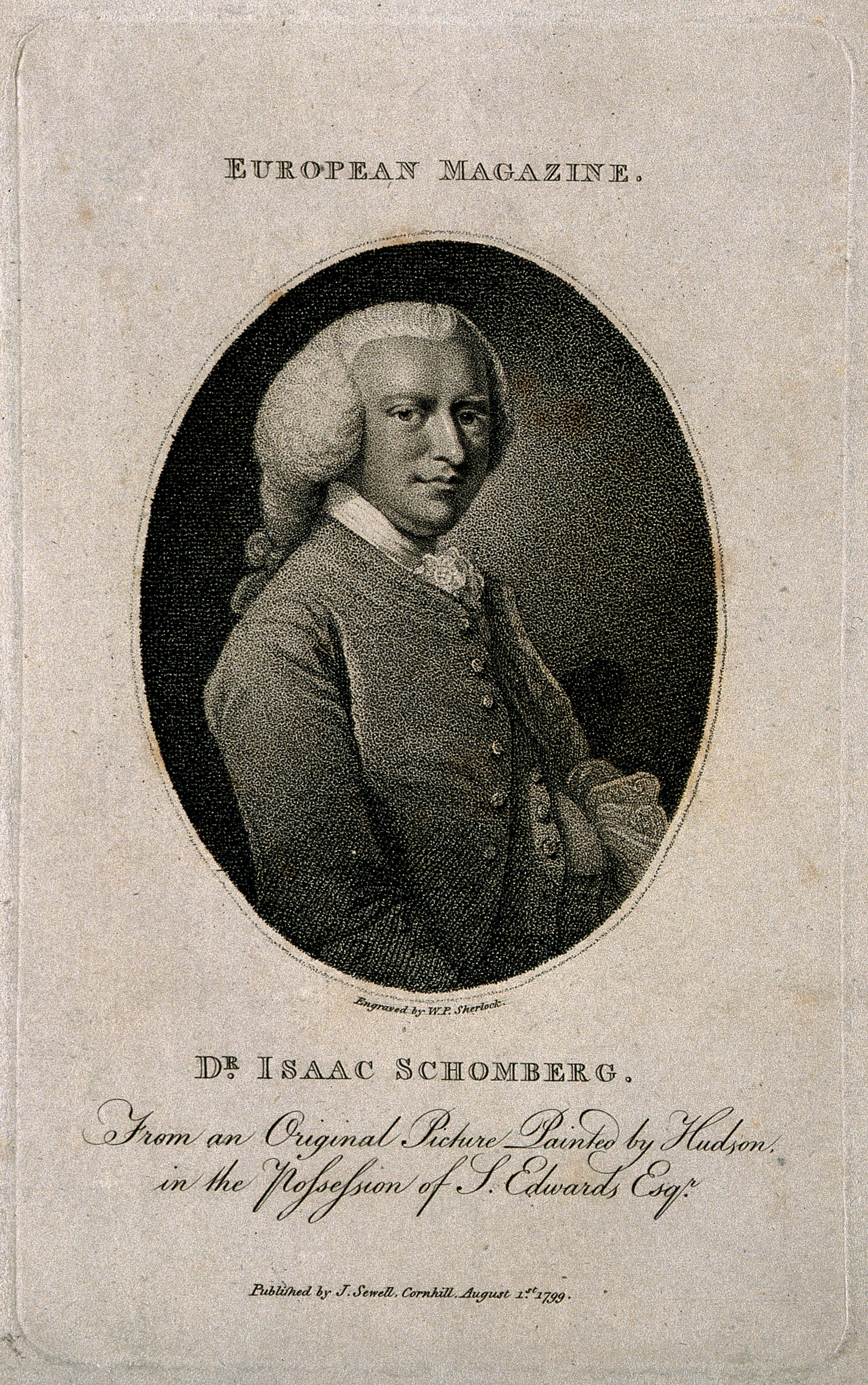
- Born: 14 August 1714
- Died: 4 March 1780 (aged 65)
- Occupation: Physician

Isaac Schomberg (14 August 1714 – 4 March 1780) was a German physician.

== Biography ==
Schomberg was the younger son of Dr. Meyer Löw Schomberg and twin-brother of Ralph Schomberg. He was born at Schweinberg on 14 August 1714. He was entered at Merchant Taylors' School, London, in 1726, and at an early age, under the auspices of his father, commenced practising medicine in London. He had no English degree, and in February 1746–7 he was summoned before the president and censors of the Royal College of Physicians to present himself for examination as a licentiate, but declined the invitation in a letter which was officially termed ‘improbable and indecent.’ In the early part of 1747, he was entered at Trinity College, Cambridge, and on 7 August 1747, when a ‘student at physic of Trinity College, Cambridge,’ he was baptised at St. Mary Woolnoth, London (Registers, ed. Brooke and Hallen, p. 111). On 3 April 1747 he notified the former fact to the censors, with a request that he might be examined after he had procured his medical degree from that university. This request was refused, and, as he still declined to be examined, his practice was interdicted by the Comitia minora of the College of Physicians on 25 June 1747.

Schomberg obtained on 21 July 1749 by royal mandate the degree of M.D. at Cambridge, and thereupon, in order that he might become a candidate for admission to the College of Physicians, claimed his examination; but the censors were ordered by the college not to examine him until his prohibition from practice had been removed on proper submission. On the following 1 December, he again came before the censors, and on this occasion with an apology, but it was deemed insufficient. He then demanded (2 Feb. 1749–50) his examination as a right, on the ground that he was a doctor of medicine of Cambridge University. The examination was allowed, and his fitness for the profession was established; but at the Comitia majora next ensuing his admission to the college was negatived by fifteen votes to two, and the interdict on his practice remained in force. He was naturalised in 1750, and made repeated applications for admission to the college, but they were all refused.

Dr. William Battie was one of Schomberg's principal opponents at the college, and was consequently satirised in the ‘Battiad,’ which is said to have been the joint composition of Moses Mendez, Paul Whitehead, and Schomberg. Two cantos were published (London, 1750), and reprinted in Isaac Reed's ‘Repository’ (i. 233–46).

Schomberg's next step was to appeal for justice to the visitors of the college, and the case came before the lord chancellor and others on 29 November 1751. After several hearings it was determined on 25 July 1753, when the court decided that it had no jurisdiction in the matter. He then applied for examination by the college as a favour; but, on account of the heavy expense of the protracted litigation, the application was refused. On 23 December 1765 he was admitted a licentiate, and as his conduct in the profession had proved satisfactory, and many of his strongest opponents were dead, he was admitted a fellow on 30 September 1771. In 1773 and 1778 he was a censor at the college.

Schomberg gained an influential position among the physicians of London. His acumen and his generosity of character won him many friends, and a short poem by Samuel Bishop on his death lauds his ‘warm benignity of soul’ (BISHOP, Poems, ii. 149).

He was called in, after several other doctors had been in attendance, at the last illness of David Garrick, when the patient, rousing himself from his lethargy, shook the doctor by the hand and exclaimed ‘Though last not least in love’ (Knight, Garrick, p. 289). Hogarth used to give him first impressions of all his engravings, and he was a legatee in William Hogarth's will. He died, unmarried, at Conduit Street, London, on 4 March 1780, and was buried at St. George's, Hanover Square, London. His portrait, by Thomas Hudson, was engraved by William Pengree Sherlock.
