= George Brydges Rodney (Royal Marines officer) =

Lieutenant-General George Brydges Rodney CB
- Military career
- Allegiance: United Kingdom
- Branch: Royal Marines
- Rank: Lieutenant-General
- Commands: Royal Marines
- Conflicts: First Carlist War; Crimean War
- Awards: Companion of the Order of the Bath

Lieutenant-General George Brydges Rodney, CB (c.1821 – 8 July 1895) was a Royal Marines officer who served as Deputy Adjutant-General Royal Marines.

== Military career ==
Rodney was commissioned into the Royal Marine Light Infantry. After serving as a junior officer in the First Carlist War, he saw action as a brigade major at the Battle of Balaclava in October 1854, at the Siege of Sevastopol in Winter 1854 and at the Battle of Kinburn in October 1855 during the Crimean War.

Rodney became Assistant Adjutant-General at Headquarters Royal Marine Forces on 28 May 1863, colonel second commandant of the Royal Marine Light Infantry and commander of the Royal Marine Depot, Deal in November 1867 and colonel-commandant of the Chatham Division on 18 September 1873.

Rodney went on to be Deputy Adjutant-General Royal Marines (the professional head of the Royal Marines) in August 1875 before retiring in September 1878.

== Family ==
Rodney was the son of Captain Hon. John Rodney and grandson of Admiral Lord Rodney. He married Isabella, the daughter of General Marcus Beresford, in 1856, and died on 8 July 1895 at Elvaston Place, London.

Military offices
Preceded by Sir George Schomberg	Deputy Adjutant-General Royal Marines; 1875–1878	Succeeded by Sir Charles Adair
