= William Benwell =

William Benwell (1765–1796), classical scholar, was born in 1765 at Caversham, then in Oxfordshire. Having been educated at Reading grammar school under Dr. Richard Valpy, he was sent early in 1783 to Trinity College, Oxford, where his abilities attracted the notice of Thomas Warton. In 1787 he took the degree of B.A. and gained the chancellor's prize for the best English essay, having previously gained the chancellor's medal for Latin verse. In November 1789 he proceeded M.A., and in the following year was elected fellow of his college. He was presented in 1794 to the living of Hale Magna, in Lincolnshire, which he afterwards resigned for the rectory of Chilton, in Suffolk. In September 1796, ten weeks after his marriage, he died at Milton, in Wiltshire, of a fever contracted while ministering to the comfort of some sick villagers. At the time of his death he was engaged on an edition of Xenophon's Memorabilia, which was published in 1804. He was an occasional contributor to the Gentleman's Magazine. Headley, in the preface to Select Beauties of Ancient English Poets, acknowledges the great assistance he had received from Benwell.
