= Alexander Schomberg (poet) =

English poet and writer (1756–1792)

Alexander Crowcher Schomberg (1756–1792) was an English poet and writer on jurisprudence.

== Life ==
The son of Ralph Schomberg of Great Yarmouth, Norfolk, he was born there on 6 July 1756. From Southampton School he was admitted a scholar of Winchester School in 1770. He matriculated at The Queen's College, Oxford, and on 9 May 1775, was elected a demy of Magdalen College, Oxford in 1776. He graduated B.A. on 20 January 1779, and commenced M.A. on 9 November 1781. He became a probationer fellow of Magdalen College in 1782, and senior dean of arts in 1791.

In later life Schomberg studied political economy, falling ill. The young Robert Southey attended him at Bath, Somerset. He died there on 6 April 1792, and was buried in Bath Abbey. He was the earliest patron of William Crotch the composer.

== Works ==
Schomberg's works were:

- Bagley; a descriptive Poem; with the Annotations of Scriblerus Secundus: To which are prefixed, by the same, Prolegomena on the Poetry of the present age,’ Oxford, 1777. The authorship has also been ascribed to Thomas Burgess.
- Ode on the present state of English Poetry by "Cornelius Scriblerus Nothus", with "a translation of a fragment of Simonides", Greek and English, Oxford, 1779.
- An historical and chronological View of Roman Law. With Notes and Illustrations, Oxford, 1785; 2nd edit. Oxford, 1857; translated into French by A. M. H. Boulard, 2nd edit. Paris, 1808.
- A Treatise on the Maritime Laws of Rhodes, Oxford, 1786.
- Historical and Political Remarks on the Tariff of the Commercial Treaty with France, 1787.
- Present State of Trade and Manufactures in France (partly printed, unpublished).

At age 13 Schomberg wrote a tragedy in collaboration with Herbert Croft. He contributed to the volumes of Anna Miller, and to the periodical Olla Podrida, edited by Thomas Monro (1788).
