= Charles Frederick Schomberg =

Officer of the British Royal Navy

Vice-Admiral Charles Frederick Schomberg
- Born: c. 1815; Devonport, Plymouth
- Died: 1 October 1874 (aged 58–59); Holyhead, Wales
- Relatives: Captain Sir Alexander Schomberg (grandfather); Admiral Alexander Wilmot Schomberg (father); Admiral Charles Ramsay Arbuthnot (son-in-law); Vice Admiral Sir Geoffrey Schomberg Arbuthnot (grandson)
- Military career
- Allegiance: United Kingdom of Great Britain and Ireland
- Branch: Royal Navy
- Service years: 1829–1865
- Rank: Vice-Admiral
- Commands: HMS Aboukir; HMS Cumberland; HMS Edinburgh; HMS Trafalgar
- Conflicts: Second Syrian War

Vice-Admiral Charles Frederick Schomberg (c. 1815 – 29 September 1874) was an officer of the British Royal Navy. He was the eldest son of Admiral Alexander Wilmot Schomberg by his second marriage.

The clipper ship Schomberg was named after him. She was built in Aberdeen, and sank on her 1855 maiden voyage from Liverpool to Australia off the Shipwreck Coast, Peterborough, Victoria.

== Career ==
Schomberg entered the navy from the Royal Naval College on 16 May 1829 with the rank of midshipman, passing his examination for lieutenant in 1833, but not obtaining his commission until 28 June 1838. On 13 July he was appointed to the ship Hastings under the command of Captain John Lawrence, to serve in the Mediterranean. There he took part in the operations of 1840 on the coast of Syria, and on the night of 1 October served in the boats under Commander Henry John Worth, at the destruction of a train laid to one of the castles at Beyrout, and the capture there of 31 barrels of powder.

On 3 February 1841, he was appointed senior lieutenant of the steam frigate Cyclops, under Captain Horatio Thomas Austin. In November 1843 he moved with Captain Austin, as additional lieutenant, to the steam gunboat Tartarus, and on 10 February 1844 he was promoted to commander.

He then served as Second Captain, from 21 June 1845 aboard the Queen, and from 6 December 1847 in the San Josef, both under the command of Sir Henry John Leeke in the Channel Fleet. From 7 January 1848, he moved into Wellesley, flagship of Vice Admiral the Earl of Dundonald on the North America and West Indies Station.

Schomberg was promoted to captain on 10 July 1851, and served as commander of Aboukir in the Channel Fleet from 25 May 1859 until 9 January 1860. He was captain of Cumberland, the guardship of the steam reserve at Sheerness from 10 January 1860 until 13 February 1862, and then moved to command Edinburgh as a coastguard ship at Leith until her replacement by Trafalgar on 29 February 1864. Schomberg took over command of Trafalgar and was with her until March 1865.

He had no further active service, but was promoted to rear-admiral on the retired list on 24 May 1867, and then to vice-admiral on 29 May 1873. Charles Schomberg died at Holyhead on 1 October 1874.

== Personal life ==
Schomberg was born in RNH Stonehouse, Plymouth and married in 1848 to Helen Hartshorne in Halifax, Nova Scotia. They had 3 daughters.
