= William Pengree Sherlock =

British artist

- Born: 1775; London
- Died: circa 1821
- Occupation: topographical artist
- Parent: William Sherlock

William Pengree Sherlock (1775-c. 1821) was a British topographical artist.

== Biography ==
View on the Thames at Battersea by Sherlock in the Yale Center for British Art

William Pengree Sherlock was born in London in 1775, and was baptised on 20 August 1776 at St Marylebone, Middlesex. His parents were William and Frances Sherlock (née) Welker. His father was an artist from Dublin. On 31 December 1794, he entered the Royal Academy Schools.

From 1801 to 1810 Sherlock exhibited at the Royal Academy, sending a few portraits, but principally watercolour landscapes in the style of Richard Wilson, to whom his works have sometimes been attributed. He drew most of the illustrations to William Dickinson's Antiquities historical, architectural, chorographical, and itinerary, in Nottinghamshire and the adjacent counties, 1801–3, and the portrait of the author prefixed to that work was engraved from a miniature by him. In 1808, Joseph Farington notes that Sherlock was unsuccessful in his application for drawing master at the Royal Military Academy.

In 1811 and the following years he published a series of soft ground-etchings from his own watercolour drawings, and those of David Cox, Samuel Prout, Thomas Girtin, and other leading watercolour artists of the day. A series of drawings in watercolour by W. P. Sherlock, representing views in the immediate neighbourhood of London, was preserved in the print-room at the British Museum.

He is thought to have died after 1821, possibly as late as 1850.
