= George Schomberg =

General Sir George Schomberg KCB
- Born: 5 October 1821
- Died: 5 December 1907 (aged 86)
- Military career
- Allegiance: United Kingdom
- Branch: Royal Marines
- Rank: General
- Commands: Royal Marines
- Conflicts: Crimean War; Second Opium War
- Awards: Knight Commander of the Order of the Bath

General Sir George Augustus Schomberg KCB (5 October 1821 – 5 December 1907) was a Royal Marines officer who served as Deputy Adjutant-General Royal Marines.

== Military career ==
Born the son of Admiral Alexander Wilmot Schomberg, Schomberg was commissioned into the Royal Marine Artillery. He served in the Baltic Sea during the Crimean War and then commanded the Royal Marine Artillery in China during the Second Opium War.

He became colonel commandant of the Royal Marine Artillery on 10 April 1867 and then went on to be Deputy Adjutant-General Royal Marines (the professional head of the Royal Marines) in July 1872 before retiring in August 1875.

Military offices
Preceded by Sir Samuel Lowder	Deputy Adjutant-General Royal Marines; 1872–1875	Succeeded by George Rodney
