= Alexander Schomberg =

Royal Navy officer

Captain Sir Alexander Schomberg
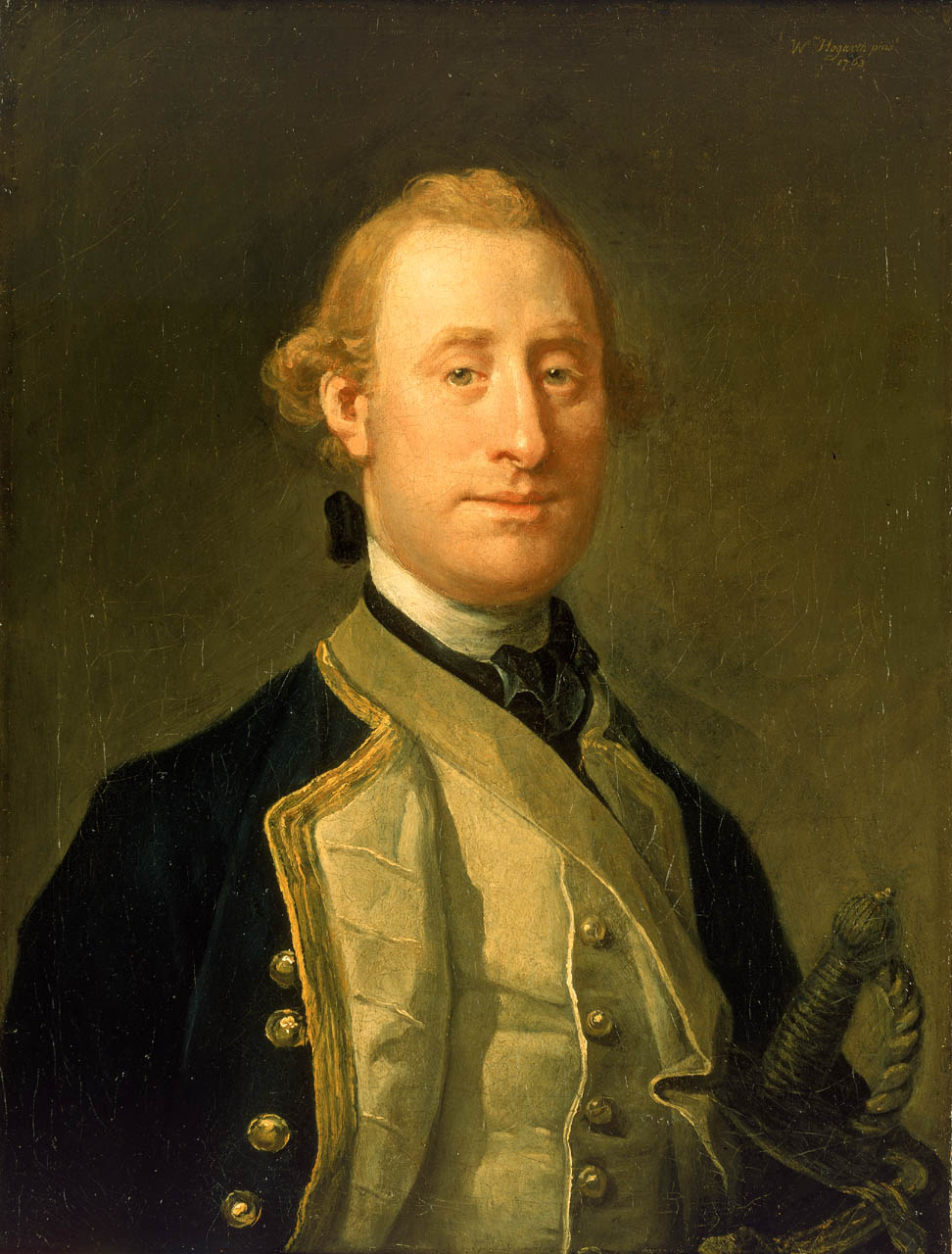
- Sir Alexander Schomberg, 1763, by William Hogarth (NMM) – Alexander's brother Isaac was a friend of Hogarth.
- Born: 1720; London, England
- Died: 19 March 1804 (aged 83–84); Dublin, Ireland
- Military career
- Allegiance: Great Britain; United Kingdom
- Branch: Royal Navy
- Service years: 1743–1804
- Rank: Captain
- Commands: HMS Diana, Essex, Dorset
- Conflicts: French and Indian War; Siege of Louisbourg; Battle of the Plains of Abraham
- Awards: Knight Bachelor

Captain Sir Alexander Schomberg (1720 – 19 March 1804) was a Royal Navy officer who served in the French and Indian War.

== Life ==
His father, Meyer Löw Schomberg (1690–1761), was a German-Jewish doctor and settled in England c. 1720 and set up a flourishing practice in Fenchurch Street, London. Two of Alexander's brothers followed their father's profession – the eldest, Isaac, and Ralph or Raphael – and two others (Moses and Solomon) went into the law, but Alexander instead opted for the navy.

Like his brothers, however, he was brought up a Jew but attended St Paul's School, London, and renounced the Jewish faith by publicly receiving the sacrament according to the Anglican rites and thus being able to enter on public careers without impediment from the Test Act. Joining the Navy in 1743 as a midshipman under Captain Edward Pratten on HMS Suffolk (70 guns), he passed his examination for lieutenant on 3 December 1747, entering the sloop Hornet on 11 December and transferring from there to Speedwell, another sloop, in the West Indies in spring 1750. The latter ship, however, returned to England, and was paid off in July 1751, with Schomberg and her other officers placed on half pay.

Schomberg's next appointment came in February 1755, under Captain Peter Denis on the Medway. This ship, however, was only in the home fleet and on the Bay of Biscay station and he was put on half pay again from June to October 1756. He then was appointed to the Intrepid (formerly the French ship Serieux, 64 guns), under Captain Pratten again.

Promotion to captain eventually came on 5 April 1757, briefly in command of the new frigate Richmond, then from the end of 1757 in command of HMS Diana, 32 guns. In the Diana he played a distinguished part in the taking of Louisburg in 1758 (taking the fleet's commander in Edward Boscawen in close to reconnoitre the coast, covering the landing and taking command of a party of seamen landed to man the batteries) and Quebec in 1759/60 (bombarding the shore under Charles Saunders and repulsing a French attempt to regain the city), and was a close associate of James Wolfe. He was then sent back in 1760 with the news of the victories. There he was appointed to the Essex, with that ship taking part in the 1764 reduction of Belle Île, under Commodore Augustus Keppel and then serving in the Brest and Biscay fleet until the peace.

At the peace of 1763 he received a commemorative gold medal for his service in Canada and married (see below). At the end of 1770 he was appointed to the Prudent, which had been commissioned due to the dispute between Britain and Spain about the Falkland Islands and was paid off at the end of the dispute. In late 1771 he became captain of HMS Dorset, the Lord Lieutenant of Ireland's yacht. Lord Sandwich, First Lord of the Admiralty opposed Alexander taking up this role, seeing it as virtually a retirement from active service, to no avail (though he then prevented Alexander from re-entering active service when Alexander too came to this opinion, soon after taking up the role).

Alexander was, however, knighted by the lord lieutenant in 1777 for his long and active service, though (remaining Dorset's captain until 1804 – a yacht captain had to leave that post if he wished to be promoted to a flag rank) he progressed no further than the top of the captains' list as the most senior serving captain of the Navy, though he spent many years in that position. Also during this time he wrote "A sea manual recommended to the young officers of the Royal Navy as a companion to the signal book" (1789), and had his second son, Alexander Wilmot, and his youngest son, Charles Marsh, serving under him on the Dorset. On his death, he was buried in the churchyard at St Peter's, County Dublin.

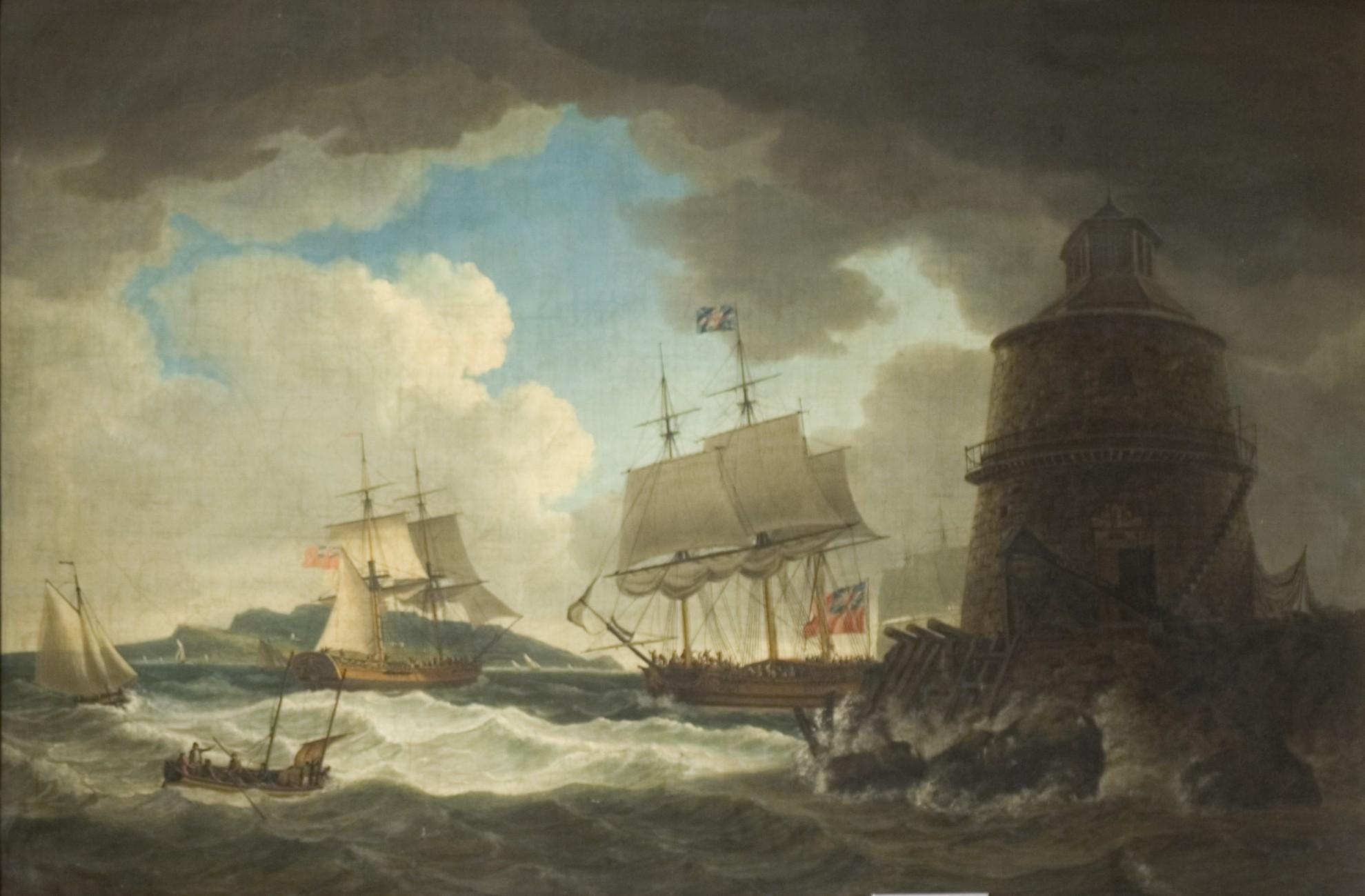
HMS Dorset royal yacht in the Bay of Dublin ca. 1787

== Marriage and issue ==
In August 1763, when peace came, he married Arabella Susannah Chalmers, only child of the Revd James Chalmers and Arabella, sister and heiress of Sir Edmond Alleyne, baronet, of Hatfield Peverel, perhaps with Hogarth's portrait commissioned and completed in time for the wedding. Alexander and Arabella's five children were baptized in the Christian faith.
