= Meyer Löw Schomberg =

German physician (1690–1761)

Meyer Löw Schomberg (1690 – 4 March 1761) was a German physician who moved to London and had a successful business there.

== Life ==
His father, Löw Schomberg, was a physician in Meyer's birthplace and Meyer (probably Löw's eldest son) followed his father's trade, studying classics, then (like his brothers, Salomon, Hertz, and Gerson) medicine, at the University of Giessen. Completing his MD degree in 1710, Meyer had practises in Schweinsberg, Blankenstein, and then Metz, but then moved to London and settled there in 1721. His first employment in London was a salary of £30 a year from the wardens of the Great Synagogue to look after the poor. The Royal College of Physicians admitted him as a licentiate on 19 March 1722 (giving his word and his bond, he was allowed to put off paying the £20 fee for that honour), on 12 January 1726 he became a fellow of the Royal Society, and finally in 1730 he was admitted to the freemasons' lodge of the Premier Grand Lodge of England at the Swan and Rummer, Finch Lane (serving as its grand steward in 1734).

By 1740 his professional income was said to be 4000 guineas a year, having established a successful practice (Sir William Browne attributed this to his offers of friendship and hospitality to young surgeons). He was, however, greatly envious of his contemporary, Jacob de Castro Sarmento, making a failed attempt to sabotage Sarmento's election to the Royal Society in 1729 by blackening his name, and in 1738 publicly denounced Sarmento's prescription of an opiate to Benjamin Mendes da Costa, one of Schomberg's former patients, in Janneway's Coffee House. Sarmento complained of the latter event to the censors of the Royal College of Physicians, but their fine of £4 against Schomberg for breaching their moral statutes only led Meyer embarking on a feud against the College via his son Isaac. Becoming alienated from London's Jewish community in general and Sarmento and his allies in particular (explained in Schomberg's unpublished 1746 essay, Emunat omen, or ‘A physician's faith’, written in classical Hebrew, and involving his conversion to deism), he also got increasingly entangled in one expensive lawsuit after another. He also rejected the Jewish community by – after 1742 – encouraging his sons to become Anglican Christians if that would aid them in the liberal professions for which he had had them educated.

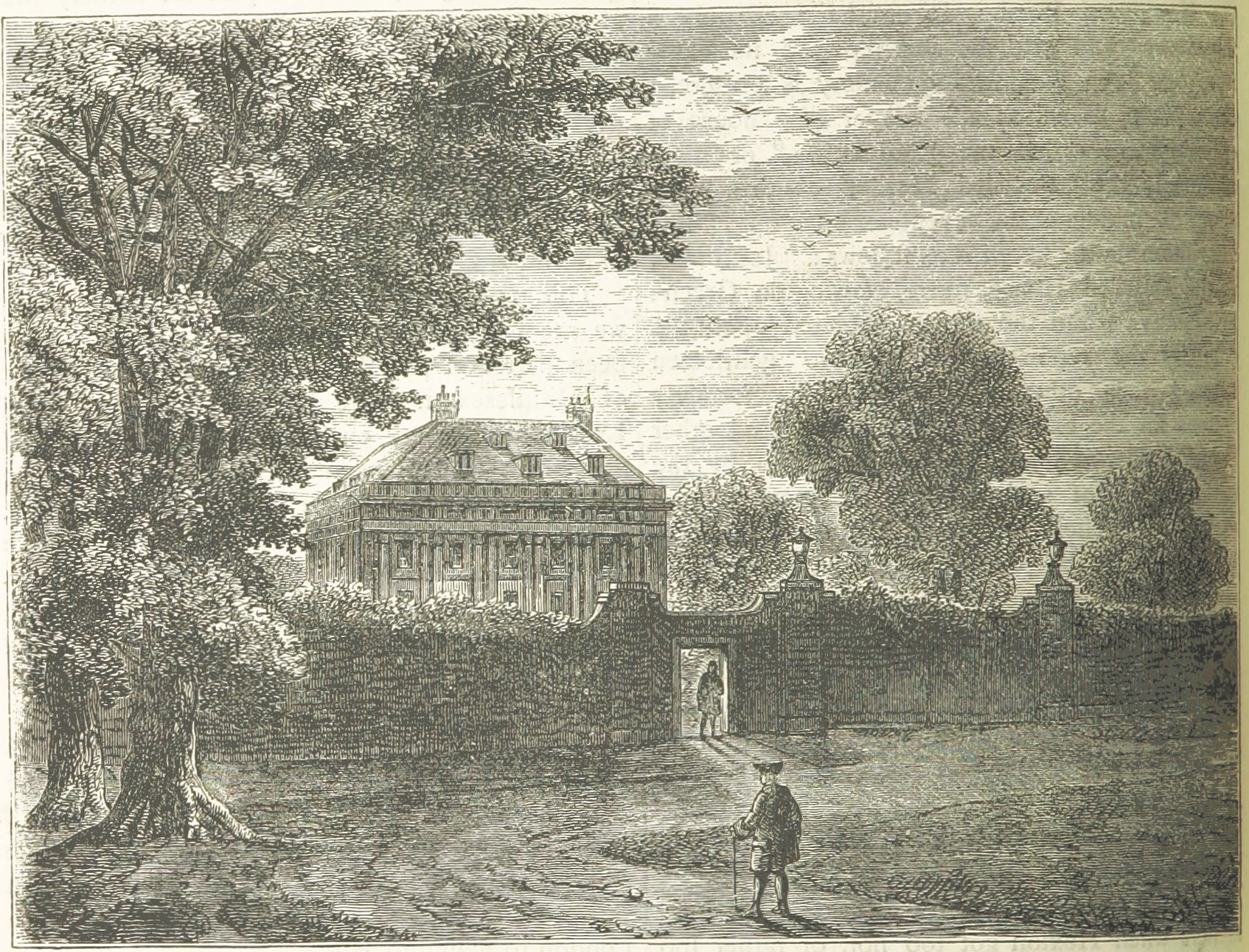
Balmes House (north of Hoxton), was taken over by Schomberg for use as a private madhouse. It's thought to have originated the term barmy.

On his death, Meyer was buried in Hackney churchyard.

== Family ==
Schomberg had at least seven sons and one daughter:

- Isaac, physician, with Alexander left all but 3s. of their father's estate in his will
- Ralph or Raphael, Isaac's twin, physician and public notary, left 1s. in his father's will
- Joel, physician, practising in Metz and Thann.
- Moses (1720–1779), public notary
- Solomon (1724–1774), public notary, left 1s. in his father's will
- Rebecca (1719–1742), died young.
- Alexander (1720–1804), Royal Navy captain, with Isaac left all but 3s. of their father's estate in his will
- Henry Schomberg, purchased an army commission, reached the rank of lieutenant-colonel, left 1s. in his father's will
