= Ralph Schomberg =

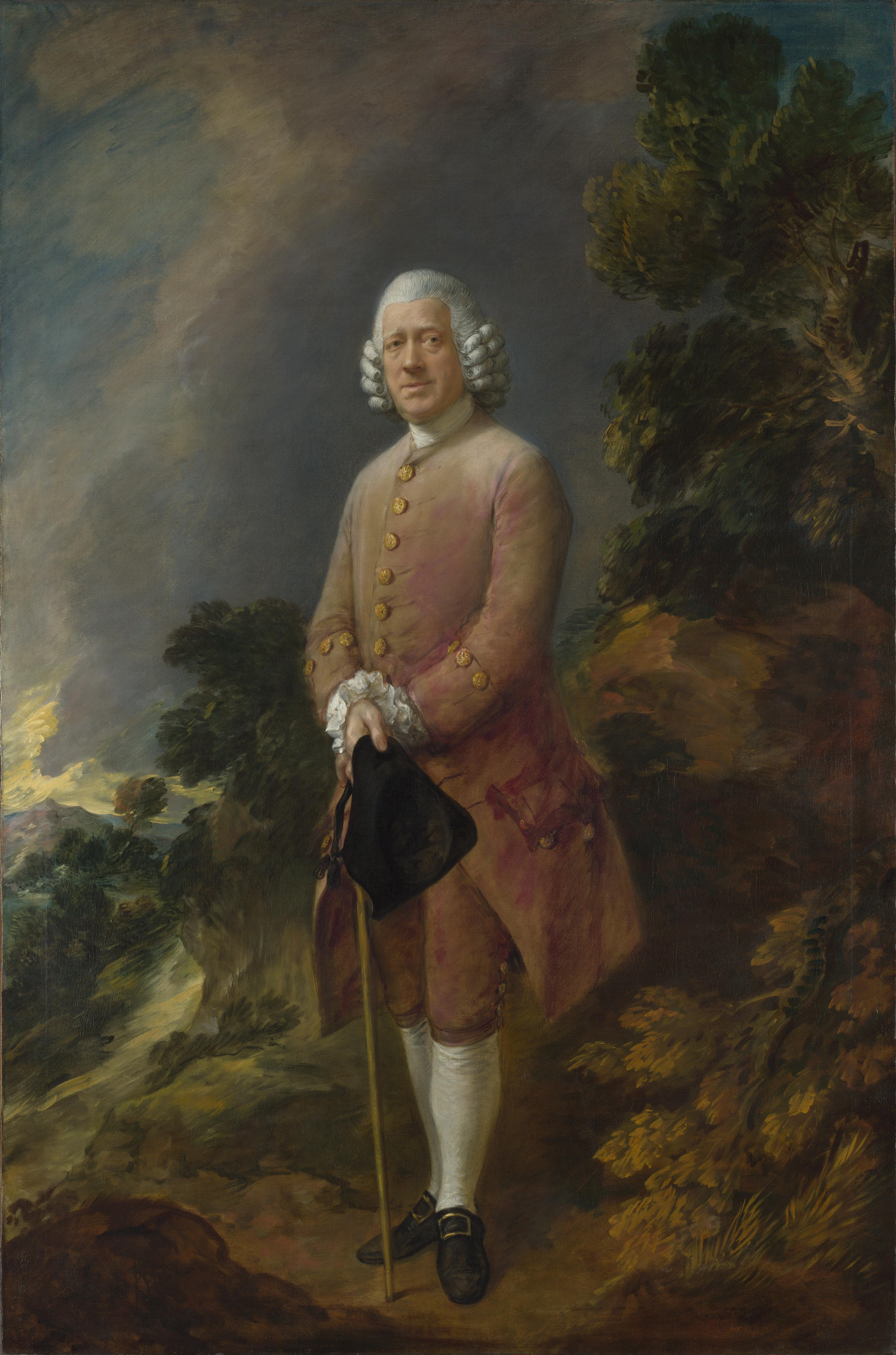
Dr Ralph Schomberg, painted by Thomas Gainsborough in Bath c.1770, possibly in lieu of medical fees. (National Gallery)

Ralph or Raphael Schomberg (1714–1792) was a British medical doctor of the 18th century.

His father, Meyer Löw Schomberg, was a Jewish medical doctor who settled in England, but he became alienated from Judaism and had Ralph and his brothers, who had initially been brought up as Jews, attend St Paul's School, London, and then renounce the Jewish faith by publicly receiving the sacrament according to the Anglican rites. This made the brothers able to enter on public careers without impediment from the Test Act. Ralph had a twin brother, Isaac, who was a physician and public notary. Ralph was left 1s. in his father's will in 1761.

Ralph moved to Bath in around 1761, and settled there until at least 1771, occasionally attending on Gainsborough and his family (including – in 1771 – his elder daughter Mary, whom Thomas hoped Ralph had cured to a recurring illness which all other doctors had told him was hereditary). He later moved to Reading.

His son was captain Isaac Schomberg.
