= Battle for Baby 700 =

Battle of the Gallipoli campaign in May 1915

Coordinates: 40°14′46″N 26°16′40″E

- Part of the Gallipoli campaign
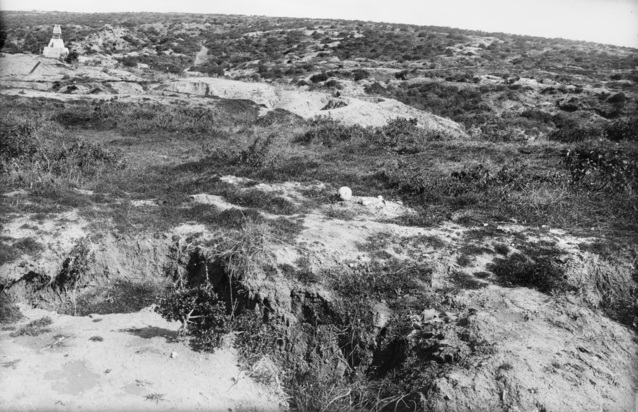
- Baby 700 as viewed from The Nek
| Date | 2/3 May 1915 |
| Location | Gallipoli Peninsula |
| Result | Ottoman victory |

Belligerents
| British Empire | Ottoman Empire |

Commanders and leaders
| Alexander Godley | Mustafa Kemal |

Units involved
| New Zealand and Australian Division; 1st Royal Naval Brigade | 19th Division |

Strength
| 3,000 men | 1,500 men |

Casualties and losses
| ~ 1,000 | |

The battle for Baby 700 (2/3 May 1915), was an engagement fought during the Gallipoli Campaign of the First World War, between the forces of the British Empire and the Ottoman Empire. (Note: At the time of the First World War, the modern Turkish state did not exist, and instead it was part of the Ottoman Turkish Empire. While the terms have distinct historical meanings, within many English-language sources the terms "Turkey" and "Ottoman Empire" are used interchangeably, although sources differ in their approaches. The sources used in this article predominantly use the term "Turkey".)

On 25 April 1915, the Australian and New Zealand Army Corps (ANZAC), conducted an amphibious landing on the Gallipoli Peninsula. The landing at Anzac Cove was supposed to capture Baby 700, on the third ridge from the Aegean coast on the first day, but Turkish opposition being stronger than expected foiled their plans and they were forced to form a defensive perimeter on the second ridge. Having successfully defended against a Turkish counter-attack on 27 April, they realised it would strengthen their position if they captured Baby 700. The operation was given to the New Zealand and Australian Division, their then strongest formation, supported by the 1st Royal Naval Brigade.

The attack proved a costly failure for the British Empire forces, after the New Zealand troops on the left flank were delayed, resulting in the main assault by the Australians becoming pinned down. A British force was brought up to help reinforce the position, but ultimately, they too were pushed back, leaving a single Australian battalion alone in the forward position. This battalion was subsequently withdrawn under darkness on the evening of 3 May, and the Turks regained the position. For several months a period of stalemate ensued. This lasted until August 1915, when, in conjunction with the Landing at Suvla, the area was attacked again. This time it met with limited success, but the deception raids notably at The Nek and Lone Pine resulted in severe casualties.

== Background ==
=== Strategic situation ===
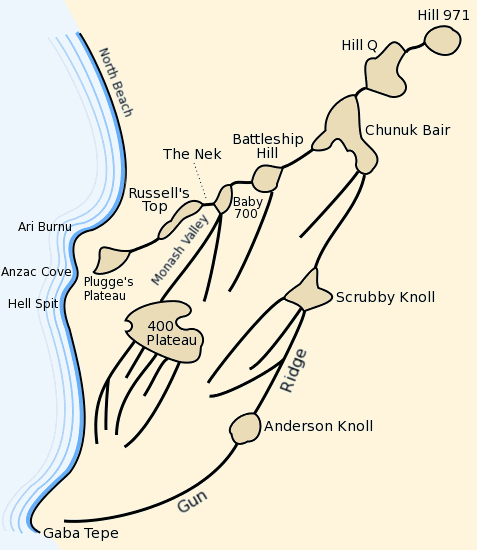
Anzac beachhead plateaus and ridges

Baby 700 is a hill in the Sari Bair range, between Russell's Top and Battleship Hill. It was named after its supposed height above sea level, but its actual height was only 590 feet (180 m). The Turkish name for the hill was Kilic Bayir. The most direct route to there from the present ANZAC lines was a distance of 350 yards (320 m) from Russell's Top through The Nek, a twenty-yard (18 m) wide piece of high ground between Malone's Gully to the north and Monash Valley to the south.

During the Landing at Anzac Cove, Baby 700 was supposed to have been secured by the 3rd Australian Brigade. However, heavy Turkish resistance had forced the brigade commander, Colonel Ewen Sinclair-Maclagan, to instead stop and form a defence line on the second ridge. This left Baby 700 in Turkish hands, providing them with a dominant position overlooking the ANZAC beachhead. That and their other positions at Russell's Top, The Nek and the head of Monash Valley, provided them with a distinct advantage over the ANZACs, to such an extent that the ANZAC posts along the south-west side of Monash Valley (Quinn's, Steel's, Courtney's) had Turkish trenches to their front and rear.

When they landed over the night of 25/26 April, the 4th Australian Brigade had occupied the posts along Monash Valley. The men defending Quinn's Post were overlooked from the Chessboard on the left, (Note: The Chessboard got its name from the "criss-cross" shape of the Turkish trenches resembling a chess board.) and from the German Officers' Ridge to the right. The Turkish lines were only fifty yards (46 m) to their front. Meanwhile the men at Pope's Hill on the opposite slope of Monash Valley, had Turkish positions along Dead Man's Ridge only one hundred yards (91 m) to their rear. At this early stage of the campaign the ANZACs' lines were a series of intermittent trenches and posts with large gaps between them which allowed Turkish snipers to infiltrate their rear areas daily. A strong Turkish counter-attack against Anzac Cove was launched on 27 April by Ottoman troops occupying the high ground around Chunuk Bair. Following this, it was decided that, in order to make the positions around Monash Valley safe, Baby 700 and those positions overlooking the valley had to be captured.

=== Allied plans ===
The initial plans called for a large-scale assault on 30 April, which would capture of all of 400 Plateau in the south, along Mortar Ridge to Baby 700, and along the seaward slopes to the coast in the north. The 1st New Zealand Brigade, in the north, the 4th Australian Brigade, in the centre, and the 1st Australian Brigade, in the south, would carry out the assault. Brigadier-General Harold Walker, who was in command of the 1st Australian Brigade, knew the country and the state of his troops and was doubtful that it would succeed. He asked the commander of the 1st Australian Division, Major-General William Bridges, to come forward and observe the situation for himself. Bridges agreed with Walker and advised the corps commander Lieutenant-General William Birdwood accordingly. After a staff conference the operation as it stood was cancelled. (Note: Walker was one of the few professionals in the ANZAC forces, being a regular British Army officer. On the eve of the landings he was one of Birdwood's staff officers. Between 25 April and 19 May he commanded the 1st New Zealand Brigade, the 1st Australian Brigade and then the 1st Australian Division.)

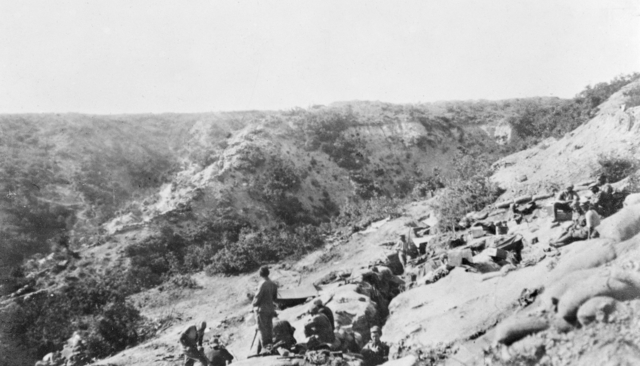
Quinn's Post looking across Monash Valley to Russell's Top

The attack was then modified, making the capture of Baby 700 the objective. The New Zealand and Australian Division, commanded by Major-General Alexander Godley, as the strongest formation, would conduct the assault at 19:30 on 2 May. As part of this effort, the 4th Australian Brigade was tasked with capturing the territory from Quinn's Post to the summit of Baby 700. At the same time, the 1st New Zealand Brigade would capture the territory between the summit and the sea to the north. A naval gunnery and field artillery bombardment of Baby 700 would begin thirty minutes before the start of the attack. It would be followed ten minutes later by the corps machine-guns, which would provide direct fire support. At 19:15, the bombardment would shift to targets on Battleship Hill and Chunuk Bair. The approach route for the attacking troops was up Monash Valley. The 1st Royal Naval Brigade would support the attacking forces. From north to south the initial assault units were the New Zealand Otago, the 13th Australian and the 16th Australian Battalions.

=== Turkish forces ===
Turkish troops holding the area came mainly from the 19th Division, under Mustafa Kemal, who had established his headquarters on the third ridge from Anzac, which had been dubbed "Scrubby Knoll" by the Australians and New Zealanders, and "Kemalyeri" (Kemal's Place) by the Turks. Several regiments would be involved in the defence of Baby 700, including the 57th, 72nd and 77th.

== Battle ==
=== Initial attacks ===
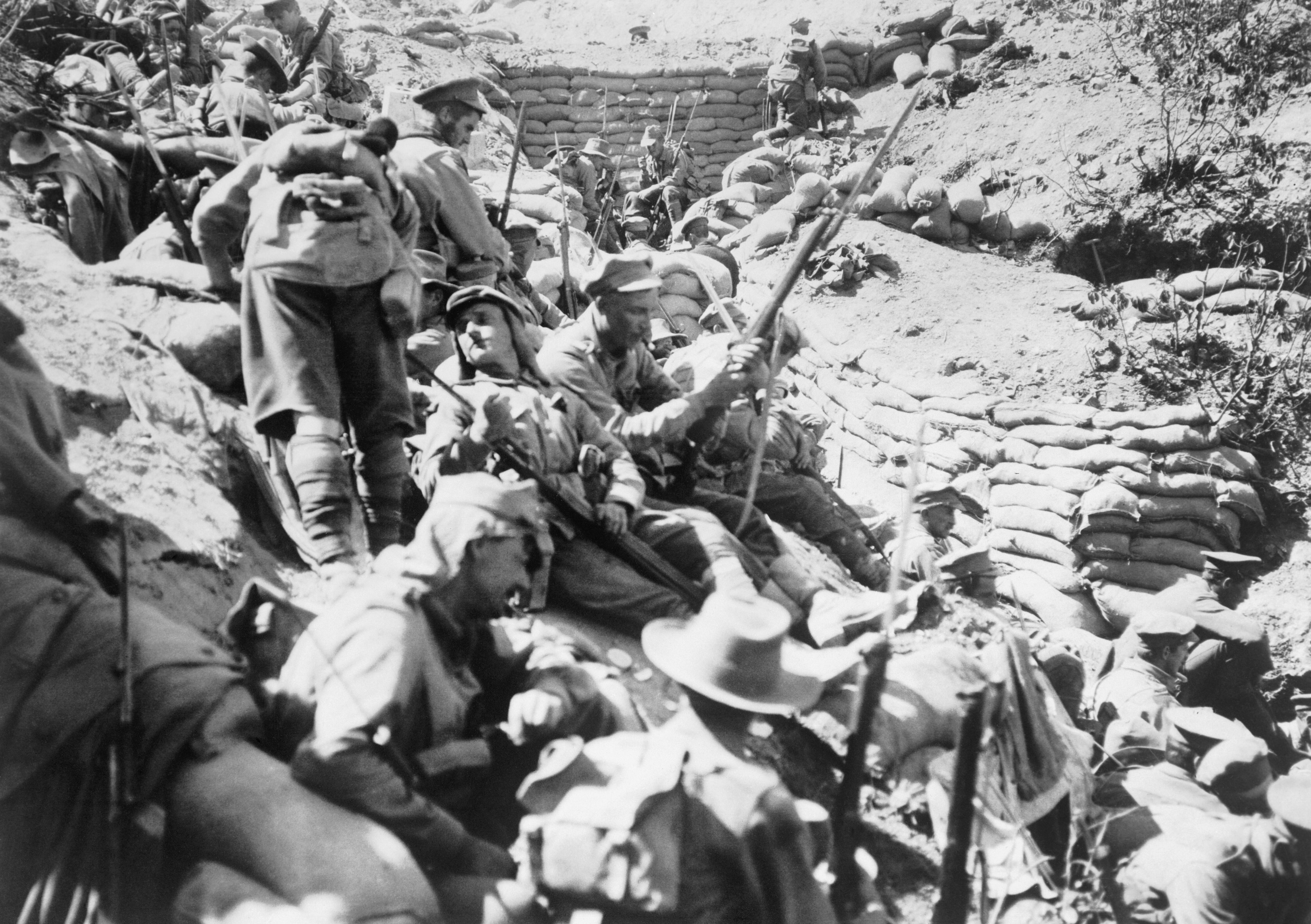
Troops from the 4th Australian Infantry Brigade behind Quinn's Post

At 19:15 as the bombardment lifted, the 16th Battalion climbed out of Monash Valley and as they cleared the ridge, came under heavy Turkish small arms fire, from The Nek and the Chessboard to their rear. Advancing a few yards, the battalion started digging in, extending the forward trench of Quinn's Post. Another section of the battalion occupied an abandoned Turkish trench five yards (4.6 m) from the opposite crest, and the rest of the battalion fought and extended their trenches through the night. However, supplying the forward troops was difficult during the night and impossible during daylight, with the Turkish machine-guns firing from their rear. At daylight the Australians charged another Turkish trench about eighty yards (73 m) away, but Turkish machine-guns on Baby 700 opened fire and forced them back. When the Turks started moving forwards towards the Australians trench around 05:00 a shell from an ANZAC battery landed behind them and part of the 16th Battalion withdrew back to their start position.

The 13th Battalion, in the centre, could only initially advance in single file due to the nature of the country. The head of the battalion led by its adjutant, Captain James Durrant, reached the slope of the Chessboard undetected. There, he stopped and counted 250 men, then ordered a right turn and advanced and captured a Turkish trench. Meanwhile, part of the remainder of the battalion continued towards the Chessboard. A guide left in the valley had been killed and one platoon, with no one to direct them, went to assist the 16th Battalion, who were calling for reinforcements. Another platoon missed the turning, continued up the valley and were never seen again. Durrant, waiting for the rest of the battalion, returned to the valley in time to direct the remainder along the correct route. The 13th Battalion was now in a position to continue the attack, but there was no sign of the New Zealanders. While they waited, they dug a trench system on Dead Man's Ridge. Their efforts during the night had cost two hundred men.

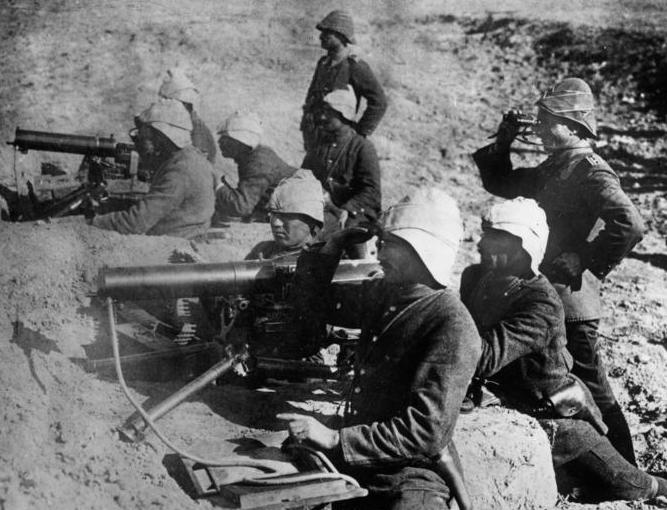
Turkish machine-guns at Gallipoli

Elsewhere, the Otago Battalion located on Walker's Ridge, had to move down to the north beach then south into Monash Valley to get into position to start the attack, a distance of around 1.5 miles (2.4 km) and it was not until 20:45 that they reached their start point. They climbed out of the valley to the left of Pope's Post, but by now the Turks were ready and opened fire on them. The New Zealanders made several attempts to move beyond the crest and eventually established a rough defence line at the foot of the Chessboard. There was, however, a gap between the New Zealanders and the 13th Battalion, which was filled at midnight by a company from the 15th Australian Battalion. But like the other assault battalions they were short of where they were supposed to be by now; The Nek, Baby 700 and the head of Monash Valley were still held by the Turks.

=== Follow up attacks ===
Godley believed the attacks had been partially successful and with a little extra effort they could achieve their objective. As a result, he instructed both brigade commanders to send more troops to support the attack. At 23:00, a company from the Canterbury Battalion left their trench on Walker's Ridge and headed towards The Nek. Encountering heavy fire from the Turkish positions they returned to their own trenches. In response, Colonel Francis Johnston, the brigade commander, ordered the whole Canterbury Battalion to try again, but the second attempt also failed. At 03:00, the battalion was ordered down into Monash Valley to help the Otago Battalion dig in and construct communications trenches; the leading troops reached them an hour later. They were directed to extend the left of the Otago Battalion's trench at the foot of the Chessboard. At daylight the Turks could be seen along the Otago trench and opened fire, forcing the battalion and the company from the 15th Battalion back into cover.

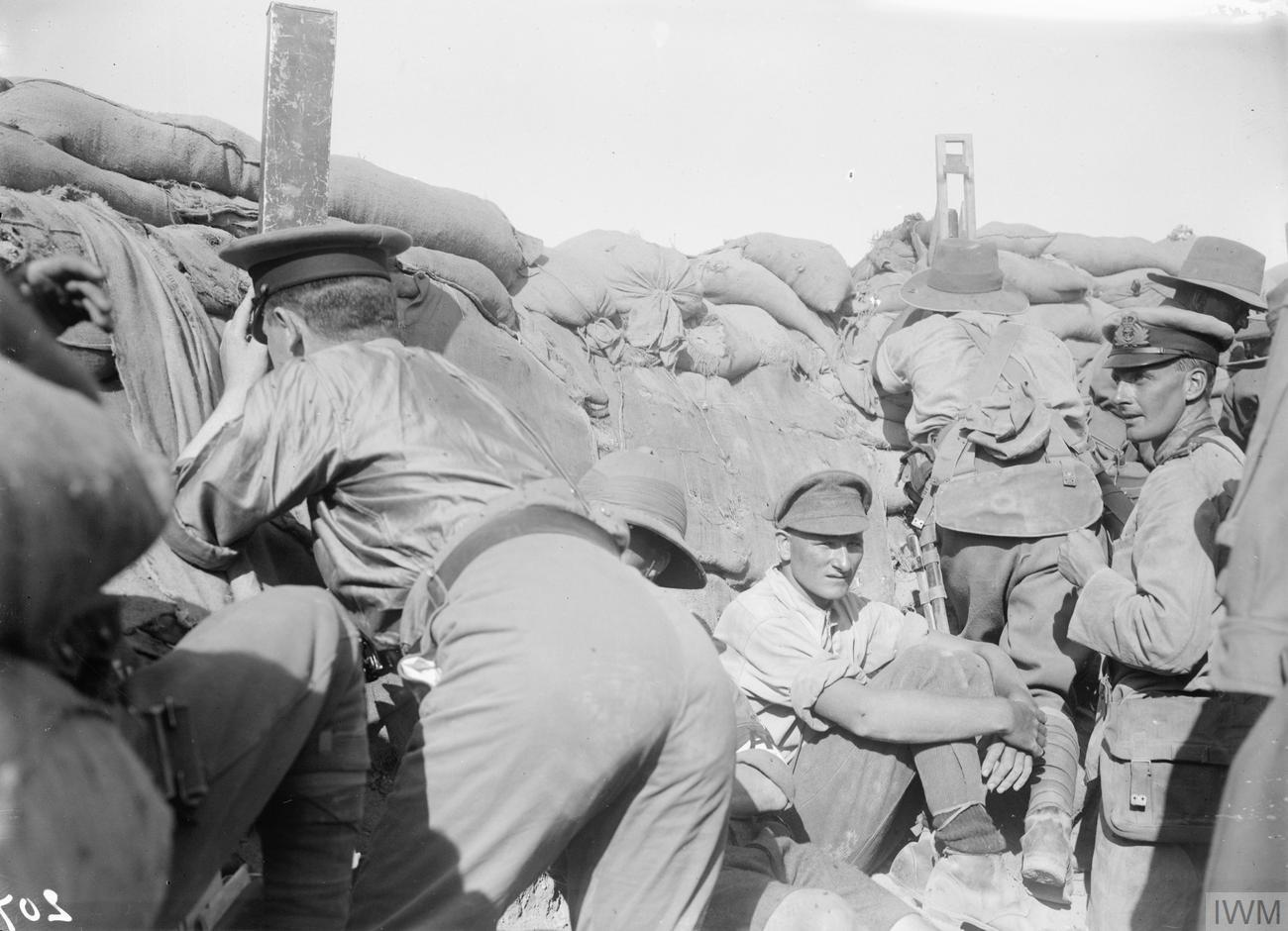
Men of the Royal Naval Division and ANZACs in the Quinn's and Courtney's Post area

At 01:35, Godley assigned two Royal Marine Light Infantry battalions to Colonel John Monash as the 4th Australian Brigade reserve. But the battalions heading up Monash Valley, by now crowded with wounded, did not arrive until dawn. Shortly afterwards, part of the 16th Battalion came running back from the front line, and some of the Marines went with them. By the time order was restored, it was daylight, and the Marines went forward to support the remainder of the 16th Battalion. Caught in the open by Turkish machine-guns to their front and rear, they were forced back. Left on their own and exposed to Turkish fire, small groups of the 16th Battalion started back, and eventually the Turks occupied their trench.

The Royal Naval Nelson Battalion was sent forward to support the 13th Battalion, and as they approached the front line, they took the digging Australians for Turks and opened fire on them, until Durrant managed to get them to stop. They then moved into the line to the right of the 13th Battalion. After artillery began falling on the positions of the Nelson Battalion, they were ordered to withdraw. Elements of the 13th Battalion heard this order and also began to move back, before they were called back into the position. Royal Marines from the Portsmouth Battalion then advanced to Dead Man's Ridge via the western approach, having earlier been heavily engaged while attempting to climb the eastern slope. On gaining the position, the Marines came under heavy machine gun fire from the German Officers' Ridge, which was to their right, and behind them. After suffering heavy casualties, the Marines were forced to withdraw, leaving their dead, who remained on the position for several days before a solo effort by one of the survivors allowed them to be brought down and buried.

== Aftermath ==
The failure of the effort to reinforce the position held by the 13th Battalion meant that they remained exposed, and alone out in front of the line. Unable to raise their brigade headquarters via telephone, or by runner, the battalion had no information about the situation. The battalion commander, Lieutenant Colonel Granville Burnage, left Durrant in charge and made a solo effort to reach Monash at brigade headquarters after 15:00 on 3 May. Reaching brigade headquarters, he was told to withdraw his battalion and subsequently headed back up the slope to direct the withdrawal after nightfall. Bringing their wounded with them, the 13th Battalion withdrew from the position in an orderly fashion and in the aftermath, the Turks occupied the trenches previously dug by the 13th Battalion, consolidating them into the Chessboard position.

The unsuccessful effort by British, Australian and New Zealand troops to capture Baby 700 resulted in heavy casualties. The exact number of casualties is not recorded, but historian Chris Coulthard-Clark estimates them at around 1,000. Ultimately, the high ground offered by Baby 700 remained in Turkish possession throughout the remainder of the campaign, and from it they were able to dominate the Monash Valley and provided observation of the rear areas of the Allied posts throughout the eastern part of the valley. In the weeks following the failed assault on Baby 700, the Turks launched several of their own attacks, aimed at Quinn's Post, which were repulsed with heavy casualties. A period of stalemate followed, as both sides began to dig in, consolidating their positions. As the campaign continued, the British, Australians and New Zealanders made plans for another effort to capture the high ground during the August Offensive, including another effort to take Baby 700 once the summit of Hill 971 had been taken. During this effort, coupled with the Landing at Suvla, the Allies attacked again, hoping to break the deadlock. This time they experienced some limited success initially before a strong Turkish counterattack regained Chunuk Bair. Meanwhile, the deception raids at The Nek and Lone Pine resulted in severe casualties.
