= Attack on Anzac Cove =

Attack on Anzac Cove may refer to several World War I actions in Turkey:

- Landing at Anzac Cove, 25 April 1915
- Second attack on Anzac Cove, 27–28 April 1915
- Third attack on Anzac Cove, 19 May 1915
