= 3rd Marine Brigade =

3rd Marine Brigade may refer to:

- 3rd Marine Brigade (Iran)
- 3rd Marine Expeditionary Brigade, United States
- 3rd (Royal Marine) Brigade

== See also ==
- 3rd Brigade (disambiguation)
