= 188th Brigade (United Kingdom) =

- Formation badge of the 63rd (Royal Naval) Division
- Active: 19 July 1916 – April 1919
- Country: United Kingdom
- Branch: British Army
- Type: Naval Infantry
- Size: Brigade of 1,500 men
- Part of: 63rd (Royal Naval) Division
- Engagements: First World War; Battle of the Ancre; Battle of Arras; Second Battle of Passchendaele; Operation Michael; Battle of Cambrai

Commanders
- Notable commanders: Brigadier General David Mercer

Insignia
- Metal divisional badge

The 188th Brigade was an infantry brigade of the British Army which comprised several battalions provided by the Royal Navy and Royal Marines. The brigade was formed in July 1916 following the absorption of the Royal Naval Division into the British Army, thereby becoming the 63rd (Royal Naval) Division. The brigade itself was the direct successor to the 1st (Royal Naval) Brigade, and would serve until its disbandment in 1919.

== Formation ==
In July 1916, the Royal Naval Division was placed under the control of the British Army, and subsequently left the jurisdiction of the Royal Navy. On 19 July, the 188th Brigade was formed by redesignation of the 1st (Royal Naval) Brigade, (Note: On 7 July 1916, the 1st (Royal Naval) Brigade was redesignated as the 3rd (Royal Marine) Brigade, but this was quickly reverted on 9 July. On 19 July 1916, the 1st (RN) Brigade was once again redesignated, now as the 188th Brigade.) which had been the new formation's direct predecessor.

== Western Front ==
=== Battle of Ancre ===
Operational map for the Battle of the Somme. VIII Corps' sector can be seen to the north near Hébuterne and Auchex.

After the evacuation of Gallipoli, the Royal Naval Division moved to France where it participated as 63rd Division in the final phase of the Battle of the Somme, advancing along the River Ancre to capture Beaucourt. The division had four objectives during the Battle of Ancre, the Dotted Green Line, the German front trench, then the Green Line, the road to Beaucourt station. The road ran along a fortified ridge. The Yellow Line was a trench which lay beyond the road, around the remains of Beaucourt on its south-west edge and the final objective, the Red Line, was beyond Beaucourt, where the division was to consolidate.

The plan was for the battalions to leap-frog towards the final objective. The 1st Royal Marine Light Infantry (RMLI), Howe, Hawke and Hood battalions were assigned the Dotted Green Line and the Yellow Line, the 2nd RMLI, Anson, Nelson and Drake battalions were to take the Green and Red lines. When the battle began in the early hours of 13 November, platoons from the 1st RMLI crawled across no-man's land towards the German line. A creeping barrage was fired by the British artillery but many casualties were suffered in no-man's land, about 50 percent of the total casualties occurring before the first German trench had been captured. German artillery-fire and machine-gun fire was so effective that all company commanding officers of the 1st RMLI were killed before reaching the first objective.

The German trenches had been severely damaged by the British bombardment, the attackers lost direction and leap-frogging broke down. The commander and second-in-command of the Drake Battalion were killed and the Hawke battalion lost its commander and several company commanders. Freyberg, having been promoted to temporary lieutenant-colonel and command of the Hood Battalion, led it to the Green Line and pressed forward with the remaining men of the Drake Battalion. The station road served as a landmark and allowed the attackers to orientate themselves and re-organise the attack. The next creeping barrage began on time at 7:30 a.m., and led the British towards the Yellow Line at Beaucourt Station. The Nelson, Hawke and Howe battalions had suffered many casualties; Lieutenant-Colonel Burge of the Nelson Battalion was killed whilst attacking a fortified section of the Dotted Green Line and Lieutenant-Colonel Wilson was severely wounded attacking the same objective. Lieutenant-Colonel Saunders was killed early in the battle but the Anson Battalion still managed to capture the Green Line and advance to the Yellow Line, after making contact with the 51st Highland Division to its left. By 10:30 p.m. Beaucourt had been captured.

=== Actions of Miraumont ===
On the north bank of the Ancre, the 63rd Division attacked on 17 February, with the 188th Brigade and two battalions of the 189th Brigade, to capture 700 yards (640 m) of the road north from Baillescourt Farm towards Puisieux, to gain observation over Miraumont and form a defensive flank on the left, back to the existing front line. Two battalions attacked with a third battalion ready on the right flank, to reinforce them or to co-operate with the 18th Division between the Ancre and the Miraumont road. On the northern flank two infantry companies, engineers and pioneers were placed to establish the defensive flank on the left. The divisional artillery and an army field brigade with 54 × 18-pounder field guns and 18 × 4.5-inch howitzers provided covering fire, with three field batteries from the 62nd Division further north, to place a protective barrage along the northern flank. The darkness, fog and mud were as bad as on the south bank but the German defence was far less effective. The creeping barrage moved at 100 yards (91 m) in four minutes, slower than the rate on the south bank and the Germans in a small number of strong-points were quickly overcome. The objective was reached by 6:40 a.m. and the defensive flank established, the last German strong-point being captured at 10:50 a.m. A German counter-attack the next day was stopped by artillery-fire. The 63rd Division lost 549 casualties and the three attacking divisions took 599 prisoners.

=== Second Battle of Passchendaele ===
The division arrived at Ypres just before the Second Battle of Passchendaele (26 October – 10 November). On 26 October, Immediately to the north of the Canadian Corps, the supporting attack by XVIII Corps involved one brigade each from the 63rd and 58th divisions. The 188th Brigade, of the 63rd Division quickly captured Varlet Farm and Banff House. The centre of the attack was held up on the road between Bray Farm and the village of Wallemolen and the troops dug-in near Source Trench. As dark fell, Banff House was abandoned and the line reformed at Berks House, leaving Banff House and Source Trench the only part of the first objective not occupied. On 30 October, the 63rd Division infantry were caught by German artillery fire at their jumping-off line and made only slight progress in deep mud against German machine-gun fire. The infantry were unable to reach their rendezvous with the Canadians, leaving their troops at Source Farm and Vapour Farm in precarious positions. Two companies later advanced through the Canadian sector to capture Source Trench but were only able to reinforce the Canadian outpost at Source Farm, then form a defensive flank to Vapour Farm. The 63rd Division had 3,126 casualties from 26–31 October. The division was able to close up to the Paddebeek by attacking at night from 1/2–4/5 November, a method which took more ground than its attacks in October, for a loss of 14 killed and 148 wounded.

== Disbandment ==
Following the Armistice of 11 November 1918, the First World War came to an end, with the 63rd (Royal Naval) Division being in the area in Picardy. In April 1919, the 188th Brigade, along with the remainder of the 63rd Division, was demobilised and its sub-units consequently disbanded, other than 1st Battalion, Royal Irish Regiment which was transferred to the British Army of the Rhine.

== Commander ==
Before the end of the Siege of Antwerp in 1914, Colonel David Mercer CB RM took command of the 1st Royal Naval Brigade. Before this appointment, he had been Assistant Adjutant General of the Royal Marines (since September 1911). On 22 January 1914, Mercer was promoted as Temporary Major General. He remained in command of the brigade, as Assistant Adjutant General until the brigade's disbandment in April 1919. On 26 June 1916, Mercer was promoted to Adjutant General of the Royal Marines and subsequently promoted as a temporary Major General.

== Uniform ==
Although supporting troops of the Royal Naval Division were wearing the anchor divisional sign, in a variety of combinations of colours, it was not worn by the infantry. They wore battle patches indicating the battalion, for example: Hawke, a black bird silhouette; Anson, a horizontal rectangle halved blue over light blue; Drake, a vertical rectangle halved blue (left) and light blue; Hood, a horizontal rectangle of light blue with a dark blue centre stripe; Royal Marines, a square of Corps ribbon; and Army units, either a title of a patch of regimental ribbon.

Below this patch was worn a square company patch: A Company was red, B Company was blue, C Company was yellow, and D Company was green.

== Order of battle ==
The order of battle of the brigade during the war was as follows:

- Brigade Headquarters
- 2nd Battalion, The Royal Irish Regiment – joined on 23 April 1918
- 1st Battalion, Royal Marines Light Infantry
- 2nd Battalion, Royal Marines Light Infantry
- 6th (Howe) Battalion – transferred from 2nd (Royal Naval) Brigade on 188th Brigade's formation
- 8th (Anson) Battalion
- 188th Machine Gun Company, Machine Gun Corps – joined 4 August 1916, transferred to Base Dépôt on 17 May 1916
- 223rd Machine Gun Company, Machine Gun Corps (Note: The 223rd Machine Gun Company arrived on 8 May 1917, but was initially destined to join the 189th Brigade, but on 12 June 1917 was placed under command of the 188th Brigade.) – joined 12 June 1917, converged with other brigade companies to form 63rd Machine Gun Battalion on 1 March 1918 (Note: On 1 March 1918, the 63rd Battalion, Machine Gun Corps (MGC) was formed. This battalion was created as a consequence of a reorganisation of the MGC, which saw the brigade MGC companies merged into a single divisional battalion.)
- 188th Trench Mortar Battery, Royal Field Artillery – joined on 21 July 1916
