= Charles Lawrie (British Army officer) =

British Army officer

Major-General Charles Lawrie CB DSO
- Portrait by Ambrose McEvoy
- Born: 1864; Bromley, Kent, England
- Died: 12 April 1953 (aged 88-89)
- Military career
- Allegiance: United Kingdom
- Branch: British Army
- Rank: Major-General
- Commands: 63rd (Royal Naval) Division
- Conflicts: Jebu Expedition; Dongola Expedition; Nile Expedition; Second Boer War; First World War
- Awards: Companion of the Order of the Bath; Distinguished Service Order

Major-General Charles Edward Lawrie, CB, DSO (1864 – 12 April 1953) was a senior British Army officer.

== Military career ==
Educated at Cheam School, Eton College and the Royal Military Academy, Woolwich, Lawrie was commissioned into the Royal Artillery on 15 February 1884.

He saw action with the Jebu Expedition in Nigeria in 1892, and was appointed Gunnery Instructor at Gibraltar in March 1893. He took part in the Dongola Expedition in 1896 and the Nile Expedition in 1898 before service in the Second Boer War in 1899.

Having been made a captain and brevet major in November 1898, he was promoted to lieutenant colonel in April 1910.

He saw service in the First World War, and was appointed a Companion of the Order of the Bath in February 1915. He was promoted in April 1915 to colonel but with seniority dating back to December 1914. In June he was promoted to the temporary rank of brigadier general and became the brigadier general, Royal Artillery (BGRA) of the 19th (Western) Division holding this post until December. He was then BGRA of II Corps before becoming general officer commanding (GOC) 63rd (Royal Naval) Division in February 1917, when he was promoted to the temporary major general, on the Western Front. He commanded the division at the Battle of Arras in April 1917 when a German advance was repulsed but at considerable cost to the division. He was reduced in rank to colonel in September 1918 when he relinquished command of the division to Cyril Blacklock.

He remained in the army after the war ended but retired in March 1920 and, having again reverted to colonel, was granted the honorary rank of major general.

== Personal life ==
His youngest son was the cricketer Percy Lawrie.
