= 97th Brigade (United Kingdom) =

Military unit

The 97th Brigade was a formation of the British Army during the First World War. It was raised as part of the new army also known as Kitchener's Army and assigned to the 32nd Division. The brigade served on the Western Front.

Cyril Blacklock commanded the brigade in 1917.

== Formation ==
The infantry battalions did not all serve at once, but all were assigned to the brigade during the war. (All cited to footnote)

- 11th Battalion, Border Regiment (Lonsdale)
- 15th Battalion, Highland Light Infantry (1st Glasgow)
- 16th Battalion, Highland Light Infantry (2nd Glasgow)
- 17th Battalion, Highland Light Infantry (3rd Glasgow)
- 2nd Battalion, King's Own Yorkshire Light Infantry
- 10th Battalion, Argyll & Sutherland Highlanders
- 1/5th Battalion, Border Regiment
- 97th Machine Gun Company
- 97th Trench Mortar Battery
