= Cyril Blacklock =

British Army general

Major-General Cyril Blacklock CB CMG DSO & Bar
- Born: 26 September 1880; Tadmarton, Oxfordshire, England
- Died: 14 October 1936 (aged 56); Simcoe, Ontario, Canada
- Military career
- Allegiance: United Kingdom
- Branch: British Army
- Service years: 1901–1904; 1914–1920
- Rank: Major-General
- Unit: King's Royal Rifle Corps
- Commands: 63rd (Royal Naval) Division; 39th Division; 9th (Scottish) Division; 97th Brigade; 182nd (2nd Warwickshire) Brigade; 10th (Service) Battalion, King's Royal Rifle Corps
- Conflicts: Second Boer War; First World War
- Awards: Companion of the Order of the Bath; Companion of the Order of St Michael and St George; Distinguished Service Order & Bar; Mentioned in Despatches

Major-General Cyril Aubrey Blacklock, CB, CMG, DSO & Bar (26 September 1880 – 14 October 1936) was a British Army officer who commanded several divisions on the Western Front during the First World War.

== Early life ==
Blacklock was the son of Joseph Herbert Blacklock and Julia Corser and grew up in the Banburyshire village of Overthorpe. Educated at Eton College, he was a keen rider who hunted with the Warwickshire Hunt.

== Military career ==
Blacklock was an officer in the 5th (1st Warwickshire Militia) Battalion, Royal Warwickshire Regiment and had reached the rank of captain when he was given a Regular Army commission in the King's Royal Rifle Corps as a second lieutenant on 5 January 1901.

He served in South Africa during the Second Boer War, and took part in operations in Orange River Colony. While in South Africa, he was promoted to lieutenant on 11 December 1901.

Following the end of the war, he returned home on the SS Sicilia in October 1902.

Blacklock resigned his commission on 23 April 1904, while his battalion was stationed in India, and emigrated to Canada, where he settled at Port Rowan, Ontario.

Following the outbreak of the First World War, Blacklock returned to England to rejoin his old regiment and quickly achieved promotion. He served as commanding officer of 10th Battalion of the King's Royal Rifle Corps from December 1915. He went on to be commander of the 182nd (2nd Warwickshire) Brigade in 1916 and then commander of the 97th Brigade in 1917, when he was promoted to temporary brigadier general in January. He was wounded during the Battle of Guillemont in September 1916 and was awarded a Bar to his Distinguished Service Order for his actions. He was appointed General Officer Commanding 9th (Scottish) Division in March 1918 and General Officer Commanding 39th Division later that month. In this position he oversaw the 39th Division's robust defence of the Somme in the face of the German spring offensive. Following the division's retirement from the front line, Blacklock was made General Officer Commanding 63rd (Royal Naval) Division in August 1918. His commanding officer, General Sir Charles Fergusson, considered Blacklock to be the "finest commander he had ever seen." Blacklock also received the praise of other senior wartime leaders for his command style, including General Sir Henry Horne and Field Marshal Sir Douglas Haig.

Blacklock retired from the army for a second time in 1920, by this stage a major-general, and returned to Canada. He had been invested as a Companion of the Order of the Bath and a Companion of the Order of St Michael and St George in recognition of his military service.

He died at Norfolk General Hospital in Simcoe, Ontario, following surgery for appendicitis, aged 56.

Military offices
Preceded by Henry Lukin	General Officer Commanding the GOC 9th (Scottish) Division; 13–16 March 1918	Succeeded by Hugh Tudor
Preceded by Charles Lawrie	GOC 63rd (Royal Naval) Division; 1918–1919	Post disbanded
