= 3rd (Royal Marine) Brigade =

Infantry brigade of the Royal Marines

Royal Marine Brigade 3rd (Royal Marine) Brigade
- Formation badge of the Royal Naval Division
- Active: 4 August 1914 – 2 August 1915; 7–19 July 1916
- Country: United Kingdom
- Branch: Royal Navy; Royal Marines
- Type: Infantry
- Size: Brigade of 1,500 men
- Part of: Royal Naval Division
- Brigade HQ: Portsmouth Naval Base, Portsmouth
- Engagements: First World War; Siege of Antwerp; Race to the Sea; Gallipoli Campaign

Insignia
- Metal divisional badge

The 3rd (Royal Marine) was an infantry brigade of the Royal Marines. It was assigned to the 63rd (Royal Naval) Division and served on the Western Front during the First World War.

The brigade then known as the Royal Marine Brigade, was raised in August 1914, from surplus naval reserves. On 2 August 1915, the brigade was reduced from four to two battalions and transferred to the 2nd Royal Naval Brigade. The Royal Marine Brigade was then disbanded. In May 1916, the Royal Marine Brigade was reformed. In July 1916, it was re-designated the 1st (Royal Naval) Brigade and then the 188th Brigade later the same month.

== Formation ==
The infantry battalions did not all serve at once, but all were assigned to the brigade during the war.

- 8th (Anson) Battalion
- 1st Royal Marines
- 2nd Royal Marines
- 6th (Howe) Battalion
- 2nd Battalion, Royal Irish Regiment
- 188th Machine Gun Company
- 188th Trench Mortar Battery
