= Percy Lawrie =

English cricketer

Personal information
- Full name: Percy Edward Lawrie
- Born: 12 December 1902; Kensington, London, England
- Died: 2 February 1988 (aged 85); Teignmouth, Devon, England
- Batting: Right-handed

Domestic team information
- Years: Team
- 1921–1928: Hampshire
- 1922–1924: Oxford University

Career statistics
Competition	First-class
Matches	33
Runs scored	1,084
Batting average	21.25
100s/50s	1/4
Top score	107
Catches/stumpings	13/–
- Source: Cricinfo, 11 January 2010

Percy Edward Lawrie (12 December 1902 — 2 February 1988) was an English first-class cricketer.

== Education and first-class cricket ==
The son of Major-General Charles Lawrie, he was born at Kensington in December 1902. He was educated at Eton College, where he played for the college cricket team. After success in the Eton v Harrow of 1921, Lawrie made his debut in first-class cricket for Hampshire against Glamorgan in the 1921 County Championship at Southampton. After leaving Eton, he matriculated to Balliol College, Oxford. He was a member of the Oxford University Cricket Club, but failed to initially gain a place in the Oxford team after failing in a trial match in 1922. However, a half century for Hampshire against Oxford University later that season secured him a further trial, with him making two first-class appearances for Oxford in 1922, against the Free Foresters and Lancashire. He featured for Hampshire during the summer holiday, making four first-class appearances in the 1922 County Championship. The following year he made two further first-class appearances for Oxford, and did so once again in 1924. Lawrie failed to gain a Blue during his studies at Oxford, largely in part due to a strong Oxford batting line-up limiting his first team appearances.

He continued to play first-class cricket for Hampshire until 1928, making a total of 28 appearances for the county. Described by Wisden as a "particularly fine off-driver", he scored 959 runs for Hampshire at an average of 22.30; he made four half centuries and one century, which was a score of 107 against Leicestershire in 1923, which was made in under two hours and helped Hampshire to avoid defeat. For Oxford University, he scored 125 runs at an average of 15.62, with a highest score of 39. Lawrie died in February 1988 at Teignmouth Hospital in Teignmouth, Devon.
