= 1st Royal Naval Brigade =

1st Naval Brigade 1st (Royal Naval) Brigade
- Formation badge of the Royal Naval Division
- Active: 20 August 1914 – 2 July 1916; 7–19 July 1916
- Country: United Kingdom
- Branch: Royal Navy
- Type: Infantry
- Size: Brigade of 1,500 men
- Part of: Royal Naval Division
- Brigade HQ: Plymouth Naval Base, Plymouth
- Engagements: First World War; Siege of Antwerp; Race to the Sea; Gallipoli Campaign

Commanders
- Notable commanders: Brigadier General David Mercer

Insignia
- Metal divisional badge

The 1st Royal Naval Brigade was an infantry brigade of the Royal Navy which was formed from excess naval reserve personnel. The brigade was formed in August 1914 and assigned to the 63rd (Royal Naval) Division after that division's formation in September 1914 and served on the Western Front and during the Gallipoli campaign, until July 1916 when it was broken up. The brigade was formed once more for a few days, but once again disbanded following the division's absorption into the Army's order of battle.

== Background ==
Before the beginning of the First World War, plans for a 'naval land force' were drawn up on the recommendation of the Committee for Imperial Defence: "[in the event of war] a force of Royal Marines would be formed under the control of the Admiralty, to be known as the 'Advanced Base Force'". When war was declared, this project was put into operation, and a brigade of marines, known as the Royal Marine Brigade (later the 3rd (Royal Marine) Brigade) was established with its administrative headquarters based in London.

== Formation ==
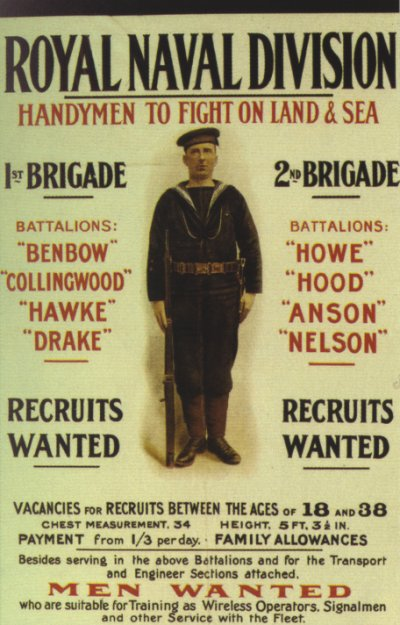
Recruiting poster for the division, showing the "Benbow", "Collingwood", "Hawke", and "Drake" Battalions for the 1st Brigade.

By the time of mobilisation, the British Army could only muster six infantry divisions (of regulars) and two cavalry divisions. To meet this shortfall, troops were withdrawn from overseas postings and the Dominions as reinforcements for the expeditionary force sent to France. New volunteer units were also formed and trained, such as the local 'Pals battalions'. However, a new division of naval reservists and Marines surplus to the fleet would undoubtedly be a great help, with Herbert Kitchener, 1st Earl Kitchener, stating during a meeting of the House of Lords that "... Their presence in the field will be very welcome, for their fighting qualities are well known.".

In August 1914, as part of the mobilisation of the British Armed Forces following the German invasion of Belgium, the Royal Navy and Royal Marines Light Infantry, were organised into battalions and 'divisions'. These forces were organised along the same lines as their counterparts in the army, except for small details such as the rank of the commanding officer, and lack of bands, etc. The forces on long being organised into battalions were now organised into eight battalions, along with an artillery battalion and five battalions belonging to the Royal Marines, but were still sitting idly by. In addition, large numbers of naval reservists were available and much above those required for manning the fleet, so on 16 August 1914, the Admiralty decided to form two naval brigades, which were grouped with the Royal Marine Brigade into the 'Royal Naval Division'. The new division maintained an administrative headquarters at the Admiralty Building, but no operational headquarters was established until late August, after which it was based in Dover.

In accordance with the expansion of the battalions, 1st Naval Brigade, was established on 20 August 1914 at the Plymouth Naval Base. The new brigade was initially organised with four battalions from local naval stations and ships, and named after according to where the majority of its personnel came from. Each was to comprise four battalions, each of 880 men and to be organised in 16 'double companies' of 220 men.

The initial organisation, however, proved to be unmanageable, and each battalion was reorganised into the following structure: 28 x Petty Officers from the Royal Navy, 48 x Petty Officers from the Royal Fleet Reserve, 424 x Petty Officers, Leading Seamen, and Seamen from the Royal Naval Volunteer Reserve, 250 x 'Stokers' from the Royal Fleet Reserve, and 187 x Seamen under 30 years old from the Royal Naval Reserve. This left each battalion with personnel coming from across the navy, leaving a total of 937 sailors.

Because of the quick formation of the naval brigades, a new camp ground was hastily constructed from 700 tents to supplement the 170 marine tents already at hand in Deal in Kent. Sailors from the Royal Naval Volunteer Reserve were instructed to bring their own rifles, while arrangements were made to issue 4,000 rifles for the Royal Naval Reserve and Royal Fleet Reserve. These were of the old Lee–Enfield Bolt-action rifles, but orders were placed for the newer short type to be delivered at the earliest possible moment. Vickers received an order for 40 Maxim Machine-Guns, to be ready in 10 days; four would be issued to each battalion, with four kept in reserve. Each company therefore continued a machine-gun section, and each of the three brigades was to form a field ambulance column.

== Belgium ==
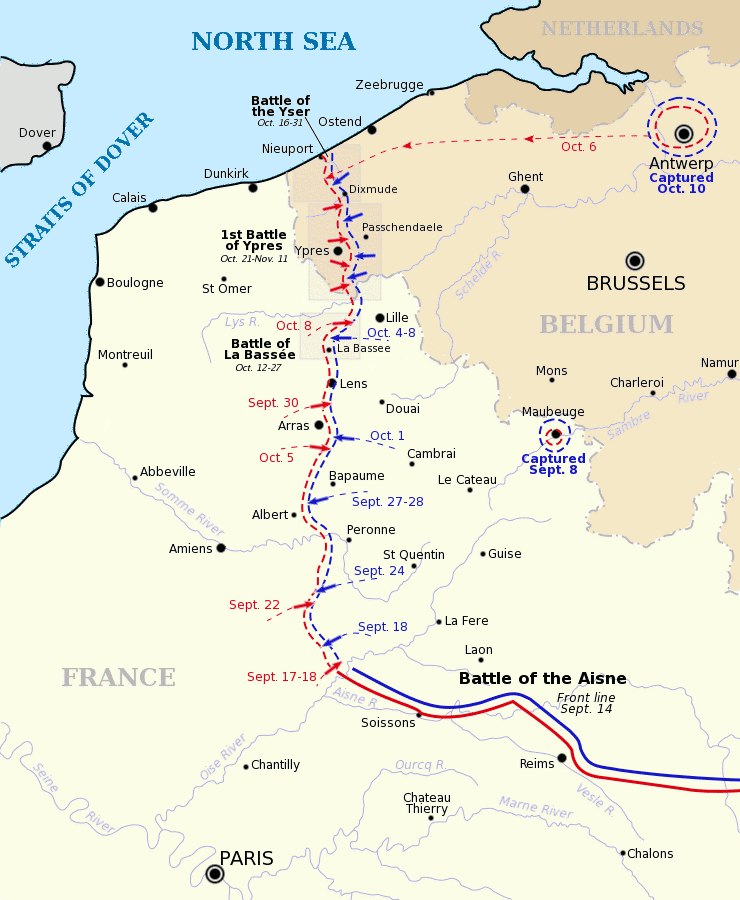
The "Race to the Sea" in September–October 1914; the final position of the front-line is west of Ostend. Antwerp is marked by a circle on the right.

On 4 October 1914, the two newly formed naval brigades received orders to embark at the Port of Dover for a move to France. On the morning of 5 October, the brigades arrived in Dunkirk. The brigade was embarked once more onboard two troop trains, and a shore train, arriving in Antwerp, Belgium at 02:30 in the morning on 6 October. Immediately upon arrival the brigade joined the Royal Marine Brigade at the Antwerp defensive line. The Siege of Antwerp had been raging since 28 September, and by 6 October the Belgian garrison was close to surrender. During the afternoon of the 6th, the brigade was detached to the right flank of the Royal Marine Brigade. This position however, was seen as untenable and during the night of 6–7 October, the (now organised) Royal Naval Division withdrew and occupied the 2nd line of trenches. The 1st Naval Brigade was dug in around the positions of Forts No. 1-8, with brigade holding the far left flank.

At around midnight on 7–8 October, a heavy German artillery bombardment opened up on the forts, trenches, and now the centre of the city, and by 18:00 at night on the 8th, Forts No. 1, 2, and 4 had all fallen or been destroyed. The situation, looking increasingly hopeless, meant a retreat from Antwerp was not only possible, but not unavoidable. During the night of 8–9 October, the division crossed the Scheldt river and marched to Sint-Gillis-Waas.

On 9 October, the division was once again embarked on trains, now heading for Ostend. However, around 1,500 men (almost all from the 1st Naval Brigade, including its commander), failed to break through and had to cross the Dutch frontier where, on the 9th, they were interned in accordance with that country's neutrality laws.

== Home Service ==
After a large number of men of the 1st Naval Brigade had been captured trying to escape from Belgium by land, the division was embarked on ships in Ostend and reached Dover on 11 October. For a short time, the division was scattered around Kent and Sussex, finding accommodations wherever available, but the Royal Marine battalions returned to their various barracks.

On 27 November 1914, the division began once again to consolidate, arriving at Blandford Camp, and by the end of January 1915 this was complete, with the entire division now grouped at the camp and in the nearby town of Blandford Forum.

== Mediterranean ==
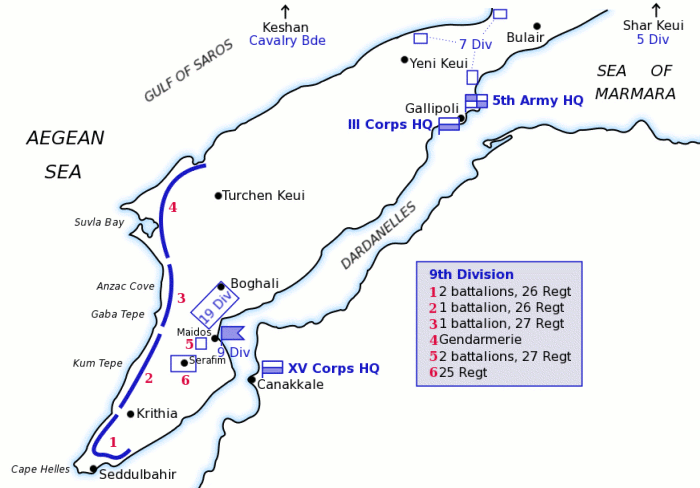
Map of Turkish forces at Gallipoli, April 1915: Bulair is on the top right.

In February 1915, the Royal Naval Division received orders to embark for an "operation in the Mediterranean". The Royal Marines Brigade left Devonport on 6 February, reaching the island of Lemnos on 24 February. The 1st and 2nd Naval Brigades however remained at Blandford for a short time for an inspection by King George V on 24 February. Right after the inspection, the two brigades were embarked on trains and arrived in Avonmouth. However, the 1st Naval 'Brigade' was now only the strength of one battalion, as the 2nd (Hawke), 3rd (Benbow), and 4th (Collingwood) Battalions, in addition to the recently joined 1st and 2nd Royal Naval Field Engineer Companies were left behind to finish their landing training. On 1 March 1915, they were embarked at Avonmouth and arrived at Port Said in British Egypt on 29 March. Between the landing and 5 April, the brigade was redesignated as the 1st (Royal Naval) Brigade, though it later dropped the prefix '(Royal Naval)' on 2 August 1915. In addition, the brigade was reorganised with the 3rd (Benbow) Battalion, disbanded on 9 June; 4th (Collingwood) Battalion left on 30 May; 5th (Nelson) Battalion, joined by 5 April; and 12th (Deal) Battalion joining on 12 March.

On 5 April 1915, the division began to re-embark on ships, and on 8 April left Egypt for Mudros, Kingdom of Greece. By 16 April, the division had concentrated around Trebuki Bay, Skyros and on 23 April the division sailed for the Gulf of Xeros. The division carried out feint landings at Bulair on 24 April, while the main body of the division landed near what would become known as Anzac Cove. On 27 April the entire division was disembarked and set up position at Cape Helles.

The division was shipped to Egypt and fought at the Battle of Gallipoli at Anzac Cove and Cape Helles. Casualties before the campaign began included Rupert Brooke, who died at sea from an infected mosquito bite on 23 April 1915. The RND was one of two British divisions (the other being the regular 29th Division) at the Gallipoli landings. Eleven troopships and Canopus, Dartmouth and Doris, two destroyers and trawlers rendezvoused off Bulair before dawn and the warships began a day-long bombardment, just after daybreak. A destroyer made a close pass off the beach and later on, ships' boats were swung out from the troopships and lines of eight cutters pulled by a trawler made as if to land. In the late afternoon men began to embark on the boats, which headed for the shore just before dark and returned after night fell. During the night Lieutenant-Commander Bernard Freyberg swam ashore and lit flares along the beach, crept inland and observed the Ottoman defences. Freyberg found that the defences were dummies and returned safely to report. Just after dawn, the decoy force sailed south to join the main landings, coming ashore on 30 April.

The division was finally relieved from the peninsula during the Evacuation from Gallipoli on 9 January 1916,

Finally, on 2 July 1916 the brigade HQ was redesignated as the 3rd (Royal Marine) Brigade, which on 7 July was itself redesignated as the 1st (Royal Naval) Brigade once again. On 19 July 1916, to bring the brigade in-line with the British Army, it became the 188th Brigade.

== Order of battle ==
The order of battle of the brigade during the war was as follows:

- Brigade Headquarters
- 1st (Drake) Battalion – left in May 1916
- 2nd (Hawke) Battalion – left in May 1916
- 3rd (Benbow) Battalion – disbanded 9 June 1915
- 4th (Collingwood) Battalion – left 30 May 1915
- 5th (Nelson) Battalion – joined in April 1915 and left in May 1916
- 7th (Hood) Battalion – joined in August 1915, split into 1/Hood and 2/Hood battalions between 1 June–5 July 1916
- 12th (Deal) Battalion – joined on 12 March 1915 and left on 30 May 1915
- 2/4th (City of London) Battalion, The London Regiment – joined in October 1915 and left in January 1916
- 1st Naval Brigade Field Ambulance Column, Royal Navy Medical Service

== Commanders ==
According to the November 1914 Naval List, the 'First Brigade' had an Honorary Colonel, the Admiral of the Fleet The Honourable John Fisher, Lord Fisher of Kilverstone GCB OM GCVO. It is unknown when (or if) he relinquished his appointment.

The first appointed commander was designated as the 'Brigade Commodore', but held the rank of Captain. (Note: Equivalent to Colonel in the Army) The first officer to hold this post was Wilfred Henderson. Captain Henderson had previously been Royal Naval Attaché to the German Empire prior to the outbreak of the war. He was interned in Holland on 9 October 1914 following the brigade's escape into the Netherlands.

At some point just before the end of the Siege of Antwerp, Colonel David Mercer CB RM took command of the brigade. Before this appointment, he had been Assistant Adjutant General of the Royal Marines (since September 1911). On 22 January 1914, Mercer was promoted as Temporary Major General. Mercer remained in command of the brigade, as Assistant Adjutant General until the brigade's disbandment in July 1916. On 26 June 1916, Mercer was promoted to Adjutant General of the Royal Marines and subsequently promoted as a temporary Major General.

- 1 September – 9 October 1914 Commodore Wilfred Henderson
- 11 November 1914 – 28 May 1916 Brigadier-General David Mercer
- 28 May – 21 June 1916 Brigadier-General Colin Macnab
- 25 June – 16 July 1916 Lieutenant-Colonel E. J. Stroud acting
- 16 July 1916 Brigadier-General Robert Prentice

== Uniform ==
Although supporting troops of the Royal Naval Division wore the anchor divisional sign, in a variety of combinations of colours, it was not worn by the infantry. They wore battle patches indicating the battalion, for example: Hawke, a black bird silhouette; Anson, a horizontal rectangle halved blue over light blue; Drake, a vertical rectangle halved blue (left) and light blue; Hood, a horizontal rectangle of light blue with a dark blue centre stripe; Royal Marines, a square of Corps ribbon; and Army units, either a title of a patch of regimental ribbon.

Below this patch was worn a square company patch: A Company was red, B Company was blue, C Company was yellow, and D Company was green.
