= 2nd (Royal Naval) Brigade =

2nd Naval Brigade 2nd (Royal Naval) Brigade
- Formation badge of the Royal Naval Division
- Active: 20 August 1914 – July 1915; 2 August 1915 – 19 July 1916
- Country: United Kingdom
- Branch: Royal Navy
- Type: Infantry
- Size: Brigade of 1,500 men
- Part of: Royal Naval Division
- Brigade HQ: Portsmouth Naval Base, Portsmouth
- Engagements: First World War; Siege of Antwerp; Race to the Sea; Gallipoli Campaign

Insignia
- Metal divisional badge

The 2nd (Royal Naval) Brigade was an infantry brigade of the Royal Navy. It was assigned to the 63rd (Royal Naval) Division and served on the Western Front during the First World War.

The brigade was first raised in August 1914. By April 1915 it was known as 2nd (Royal Naval) Brigade. In July 1915, the Brigade was broken up, then reformed on 2 August 1915 and re-designated 2nd Brigade. It was further re-designated the 2nd (Royal Naval) Brigade and the 189th Brigade in July 1916.

== Formation ==
The infantry battalions did not all serve at once, but all were assigned to the brigade during the war.

- 5th (Nelson) Battalion
- 6th (Howe) Battalion
- 7th (Hood) Battalion
- 8th (Anson) Battalion
- Chatham & Deal Battalion
- Portsmouth & Plymouth Battalion
- 2/2nd Battalion, London Regiment
- 2nd (Hawke) Battalion
- 4th (Collingwood) Battalion
- 1st (Drake) Battalion
- 189th Machine Gun Company
- 189th Trench Mortar Battery

== Commanders ==
- 1 September – 27 October 1914 Commodore Oliver Backhouse
- 27 October 1914 – 20 September 1915 Brigadier-General Charles Trotman
- 20 September – 1 October 1915 Lieutenant-Colonel E. J. Stroud acting
- 1 October – 13 November 1915 Brigadier-General Charles Trotman
- 19 November 1915 – 26 January 1916 Lieutenant-Colonel E. J. Stroud acting
- 26 January – 21 May 1916 Brigadier-General Charles Trotman
- 21 May – 27 May 1916 Lieutenant-Colonel L. Wilson acting
- 27 May 1916 Brigadier-General L. F. Philips
