= Second attack on Anzac Cove =

Battle in 1915 during the First World War

Coordinates: 40°22′2″N 26°27′18″E

- Part of the Gallipoli campaign
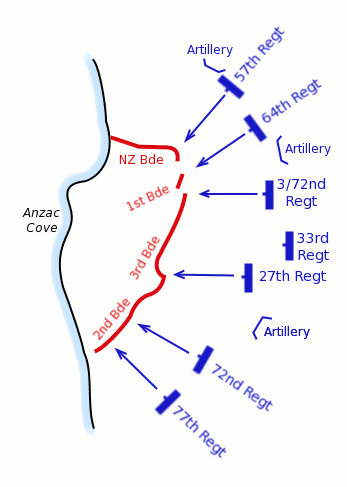
- Turkish and ANZAC dispositions for the attack
Date	27–29 April 1915
Location	ANZAC Cove, Gallipoli Peninsula, Ottoman Empire
Result	British victory
Territorial changes	Ottoman assault on ANZAC Cove repelled

Belligerents
United Kingdom	Ottoman Empire

Commanders and leaders
Unknown	Unknown

Casualties and losses
2,000 killed, wounded or missing	Unknown

The second attack on ANZAC Cove (27–29 April 1915) was an engagement during the Gallipoli Campaign of the First World War. The attack was conducted by the forces of the Ottoman Turkish Empire, against the forces of the British Empire defending the cove. (Note: At the time of the First World War, the modern Turkish state did not exist, and instead it was part of the Ottoman Turkish Empire. While the terms have distinct historical meanings, within many English-language sources the terms "Turkey" and "Ottoman Empire" are used synonymously, although sources differ in their approaches. The sources used in this article predominantly use the term "Turkey".)
