= List of ships built by Hall, Russell & Company (901–1000) =

List of ships built by Aberdeen shipbuilders Hall, Russell & Company, from yard number 901 to 1000.

The ships built in the sequence 901 to 1000 cover the period 1962 to 1990. Yard number 1000 represents the last vessel built by Hall, Russell & Company (then trading as AP Appledore (Aberdeen). The yard would close in 1992.

One vessel built during this period by Hall, Russell & Company has become well known in popular culture, a fisheries protection vessel built for the Scotland Fisheries Protection Agency as Westra (Yard number 962). This vessel was bought by the Sea Shepherd Conservation Society and initially renamed in honour of Robert Hunter. It is currently named the MY Steve Irwin, and is involved with anti whaling protests and general conservation work.

List of Hall, Russell & Company built ships (901–1000)
Name	Image	Yard Number	Construction	Type	Year	Length Overall	Breadth	Depth	Tonnage	Ref(s)
Orcadia		901	Steel	Ferry - Passenger & Cargo	1962	150 feet 4 inches (45.82 m)	36 feet 1 inch (11.00 m)	13 feet 6 inches (4.11 m)	896 long tons (910 t)	
Ballyrush		902		Cargo - Collier (Coal)	1962	240 feet 7 inches (73.33 m)	39 feet 1 inch (11.91 m)	15 feet 9 inches (4.80 m)	1,575 long tons (1,600 t)	
Ballyrory		903		Cargo - Collier (Coal)	1962	240 feet 7 inches (73.33 m)	39 feet 1 inch (11.91 m)	15 feet 9 inches (4.80 m)	1,575 long tons (1,600 t)	
Spray		904		Cargo - Collier (Coal)	1962	180 feet 5 inches (54.99 m)	33 feet 1 inch (10.08 m)	14 feet 4 inches (4.37 m)	890 long tons (900 t)	
Prince Philip		905	Steel	Trawler	1963	135 feet 2 inches (41.20 m)	29 feet 1 inch (8.86 m)	15 feet (4.6 m)	442 long tons (449 t)	
Walanka		906	Steel	Motor Yacht	1963	110 feet 6 inches (33.68 m)	23 feet 1 inch (7.04 m)	11 feet 6 inches (3.51 m)	170 long tons (170 t)	
Tyger		907	Steel	Ketch	1963	88 feet 4.5 inches (26.937 m)	21 feet 4 inches (6.50 m)	11 feet 6 inches (3.51 m)	115 long tons (117 t)	
Pilgrim		908	Steel	Motor Yacht	1964	122 feet 10 inches (37.44 m)	26 feet 1 inch (7.95 m)	18 feet 10 inches (5.74 m)	311 long tons (316 t)	
Northella		909	Steel	Trawler	1964	214 feet 6 inches (65.38 m)	40 feet 6 inches (12.34 m)	26 feet 6 inches (8.08 m)	1,718 long tons (1,746 t)	
Hebrides	Herbrides at Tarbert	910	Steel	Passenger & Vehicle Ferry	1964	220 feet 7 inches (67.23 m)	43 feet 7 inches (13.28 m)	13 feet (4.0 m)	2,104 long tons (2,138 t)	
Clansman	Clansman at Armadale pier	911	Steel	Passenger & Vehicle Ferry	1964	220 feet 7 inches (67.23 m)	43 feet 7 inches (13.28 m)	13 feet (4.0 m)	2,104 long tons (2,138 t)	
Columba	Columba as Hebridean Princess	912	Steel	Passenger & Vehicle Ferry	1964	220 feet 7 inches (67.23 m)	43 feet 7 inches (13.28 m)	13 feet (4.0 m)	2,104 long tons (2,138 t)	
Patra		913		Motor Yacht	1964	101 feet 3 inches (30.86 m)	22 feet 1 inch (6.73 m)	6 feet (1.8 m)	196 long tons (199 t)	
Hawthorn		914	Steel	Trawler	1965	119 feet 4 inches (36.37 m)	31 feet 1 inch (9.47 m)	14 feet 5 inches (4.39 m)	589 long tons (598 t)	
Hibiscus		915	Steel	Trawler	1965	119 feet 4 inches (36.37 m)	31 feet 1 inch (9.47 m)	14 feet 5 inches (4.39 m)	589 long tons (598 t)	
Begonia		916	Steel	Trawler	1964	121 feet 10 inches (37.13 m)	26 feet 7 inches (8.10 m)	13 feet 9 inches (4.19 m)	340 long tons (350 t)	
Dahlia		917	Steel	Trawler	1964	121 feet 10 inches (37.13 m)	26 feet 7 inches (8.10 m)	13 feet 9 inches (4.19 m)	340 long tons (350 t)	
Erica		918	Steel	Trawler	1965	121 feet 10 inches (37.13 m)	26 feet 7 inches (8.10 m)	13 feet 9 inches (4.19 m)	340 long tons (350 t)	
Iris		919	Steel	Trawler	1965	121 feet 10 inches (37.13 m)	26 feet 7 inches (8.10 m)	13 feet 9 inches (4.19 m)	340 long tons (350 t)	
Lupin		920	Steel	Trawler	1965	121 feet 10 inches (37.13 m)	26 feet 7 inches (8.10 m)	13 feet 9 inches (4.19 m)	340 long tons (350 t)	
Ixia		921	Steel	Trawler	1965	121 feet 10 inches (37.13 m)	26 feet 7 inches (8.10 m)	13 feet 9 inches (4.19 m)	340 long tons (350 t)	
Rochea		922	Steel	Trawler	1965	121 feet 10 inches (37.13 m)	26 feet 7 inches (8.10 m)	13 feet 9 inches (4.19 m)	340 long tons (350 t)	
Kirkella		924	Steel	Trawler	1965	214 feet 6 inches (65.38 m)	40 feet 6 inches (12.34 m)	26 feet 6 inches (8.08 m)	1,714 long tons (1,742 t)	
Conqueror		925	Steel	Trawler	1965	200 feet 6 inches (61.11 m)	41 feet 1 inch (12.52 m)	19 feet (5.8 m)	1,157 long tons (1,176 t)	
Aberdeen Explorer		926	Steel	Trawler	1965	134 feet 10 inches (41.10 m)	29 feet 1 inch (8.86 m)	15 feet (4.6 m)	425 long tons (432 t)	
Lady Alison		927	Steel	Oil Rig Supply Vessel	1965	175 feet 5 inches (53.47 m)	37 feet 1 inch (11.30 m)	15 feet (4.6 m)	854 long tons (868 t)	
Sir Fred Parkes		928	Steel	Trawler	1966	205 feet 9 inches (62.71 m)	41 feet 1 inch (12.52 m)	26 feet 7 inches (8.10 m)	1,033 long tons (1,050 t)	
Lady Parkes		929	Steel	Trawler	1966	205 feet 9 inches (62.71 m)	41 feet 1 inch (12.52 m)	26 feet 7 inches (8.10 m)	1,033 long tons (1,050 t)	
Kingsnorth Fisher	Kingsnorth Fisher	930	Steel	Cargo Ro-Ro	1966	261 feet (80 m)	53 feet (16 m)	20 feet 7 inches (6.27 m)	2,355 long tons (2,393 t)	
Criscilla	RMAS Colonel Templer	931	Steel	Trawler	1966	161 feet 5 inches (49.20 m)	36 feet 1 inch (11.00 m)	15 feet 6 inches (4.72 m)	952 long tons (967 t)	
Duburg		932	Steel	Cargo	1967	345 feet (105 m)	52 feet 9 inches (16.08 m)	20 feet (6.1 m)	2,649 long tons (2,692 t)	
Glucksburg		933	Steel	Cargo	1967	345 feet (105 m)	52 feet 9 inches (16.08 m)	20 feet (6.1 m)	2,649 long tons (2,692 t)	
Troyburg		934	Steel	Cargo	1967	345 feet 10 inches (105.41 m)	52 feet 9 inches (16.08 m)	20 feet 10 inches (6.35 m)	2,652 long tons (2,695 t)	
Point Law		935	Steel	Tanker - Coastal	1967	235 feet (72 m)	40 feet 8 inches (12.40 m)	16 feet 10 inches (5.13 m)	1,529 long tons (1,554 t)	
Inverness		936	Steel	Tanker - Coastal	1968	235 feet (72 m)	40 feet (12 m)	16 feet (4.9 m)	1,529 long tons (1,554 t)	
Ardrossan		937	Steel	Tanker - Coastal	1968	235 feet (72 m)	40 feet (12 m)	16 feet (4.9 m)	1,529 long tons (1,554 t)	
Grangemouth		938	Steel	Tanker - Coastal	1968	235 feet (72 m)	40 feet (12 m)	16 feet (4.9 m)	1,529 long tons (1,554 t)	
Shearwater	Shearwater	939	Steel	Dredger - Grab and Suction	1968	119 feet 11 inches (36.55 m)	29 feet 6 inches (8.99 m)	10 feet (3.0 m)	342 long tons (347 t)	
Clupea	Clupea	940	Steel	Fisheries research vessel	1968	106 feet (32 m)	26 feet (7.9 m)	13 feet 6 inches (4.11 m)	250 long tons (250 t)	
Southella		941	Steel	Trawler	1969	246 feet (75 m)	41 feet 7 inches (12.67 m)	26 feet 7 inches (8.10 m)	1,144 long tons (1,162 t)	
Wilmington		942	Steel	Cargo - Bulk	1969	384 feet 5 inches (117.17 m)	56 feet 6 inches (17.22 m)	32 feet 7 inches (9.93 m)	5,689 long tons (5,780 t)	
Silvereid		943	Steel	Tanker - Chemical	1969	281 feet (86 m)	40 feet 1 inch (12.22 m)	19 feet (5.8 m)	1,596 long tons (1,622 t)	
Dublin		944	Steel	Tanker - Coastal	1969	214 feet 9 inches (65.46 m)	37 feet 2 inches (11.33 m)	14 feet 7 inches (4.45 m)	1,077 long tons (1,094 t)	
Ferring		945	Steel	Cargo	1969	266 feet (81 m)	43 feet 2 inches (13.16 m)	21 feet (6.4 m)	1,596 long tons (1,622 t)	
Malling		946	Steel	Cargo	1969	266 feet (81 m)	43 feet 1 inch (13.13 m)	21 feet 1 inch (6.43 m)	1,596 long tons (1,622 t)	
Protea		947	Steel	Trawler	1970	200 feet (61 m)	38 feet 7 inches (11.76 m)	13 feet 4 inches (4.06 m)	806 long tons (819 t)	
Silverharrier		948	Steel	Tanker - Chemical	1970	330 feet 10 inches (100.84 m)	54 feet 3 inches (16.54 m)	29 feet 7 inches (9.02 m)	4,622 long tons (4,696 t)	
Thameshaven		949	Steel	Cargo	1970	437 feet 7 inches (133.38 m)	68 feet (21 m)	31 feet 1 inch (9.47 m)	8,992 long tons (9,136 t)	
Anemone		950	Steel	Trawler	1970	200 feet (61 m)	38 feet 7 inches (11.76 m)	13 feet 5 inches (4.09 m)	802 long tons (815 t)	
Azalea		951	Steel	Trawler	1971	172 feet 11 inches (52.71 m)	38 feet 7 inches (11.76 m)	16 feet 3 inches (4.95 m)	802 long tons (815 t)	
Melita		953	Steel	Cargo	1971	310 feet 9 inches (94.72 m)	53 feet (16 m)	21 feet 7 inches (6.58 m)	2,686 long tons (2,729 t)	
Makaria		954	Steel	Cargo	1972	310 feet 9 inches (94.72 m)	53 feet (16 m)	21 feet 7 inches (6.58 m)	2,686 long tons (2,729 t)	
Bridgeman		955	Steel	Tanker - Oil	1972	320 feet (98 m)	49 feet 1 inch (14.96 m)	26 feet 1 inch (7.95 m)	3,701 long tons (3,760 t)	
Gilia		956	Steel	Trawler	1972	172 feet 11 inches (52.71 m)	38 feet 7 inches (11.76 m)	16 feet 6 inches (5.03 m)	802 long tons (815 t)	
Godetia		957	Steel	Trawler	1972	172 feet 11 inches (52.71 m)	38 feet 7 inches (11.76 m)	16 feet 5 inches (5.00 m)	802 long tons (815 t)	
Salvia		958	Steel	Trawler	1972	200 feet (61 m)	38 feet 7 inches (11.76 m)	13 feet 5 inches (4.09 m)	802 long tons (815 t)	
Stevia		959	Steel	Trawler	1972	172 feet 11 inches (52.71 m)	38 feet 7 inches (11.76 m)	16 feet 6 inches (5.03 m)	802 long tons (815 t)	
Jura		960	Steel	Fisheries Protection Vessel (Civilian); Island class	1973	52 metres (171 ft)	10.97 metres (36.0 ft)	6.81 metres (22.3 ft)	892 long tons (906 t)	
Lady Rosemary		961	Steel	Tug & Supply Vessel	1974	Unknown	Unknown	Unknown	920 long tons (930 t)	
Westra	Westra (now MV Steve Irwin)	962	Steel	Fisheries Protection Vessel (Civilian); Island class	1974	195 feet (59 m)	36 feet (11 m)	14 feet (4.3 m)	885 long tons (899 t)	
St. Ola (III)		963	Steel	Ferry - Ro-Ro	1974	Unknown	Unknown	Unknown	1,345 long tons (1,367 t)	
Orionman		964	Steel	Tanker - Chemical	1975	97.54 metres (320.0 ft)	14.94 metres (49.0 ft)	7.925 metres (26.00 ft)	3,623 long tons (3,681 t)	
Courage		965	Steel	Purse Seiner	1974	33.53 metres (110.0 ft)	7.31 metres (24.0 ft)	2.801 metres (9.19 ft)	150 long tons (150 t)	
Trojan Tide		966	Steel	Oil Rig Supply Vessel	1975	Unknown	Unknown	Unknown	1,080 long tons (1,100 t)	
Spartan Tide		967	Steel	Oil Rig Supply Vessel	1975	Unknown	Unknown	Unknown	1,080 long tons (1,100 t)	
Centaurman		969	Steel	Tanker - Chemical	1976	83.6 metres (274 ft)	14 metres (46 ft)	7.825 metres (25.67 ft)	2,475 long tons (2,515 t)	
Vegaman		970	Steel	Tanker - Chemical	1976	83.6 metres (274 ft)	14 metres (46 ft)	7.825 metres (25.67 ft)	2,475 long tons (2,515 t)	
Jersey		971	Steel	Fisheries Protection Vessel (Royal Navy); Island class	1976	195 feet 3 inches (59.51 m)	34 feet 2 inches (10.41 m)	Unknown	925 long tons (940 t)	
Orkney		972	Steel	Fisheries Protection Vessel (Royal Navy); Island class	1976	195 feet 3 inches (59.51 m)	34 feet 2 inches (10.41 m)	Unknown	925 long tons (940 t)	
Shetland		973	Steel	Fisheries Protection Vessel (Royal Navy); Island class	1977	195 feet 3 inches (59.51 m)	34 feet 2 inches (10.41 m)	Unknown	925 long tons (940 t)	
Guernsey	HMS Guernsey, now BNS Sangu	974	Steel	Fisheries Protection Vessel (Royal Navy); Island class	1976	195 feet 3 inches (59.51 m)	34 feet 2 inches (10.41 m)	Unknown	925 long tons (940 t)	
Lindisfarne		975	Steel	Fisheries Protection Vessel (Royal Navy); Island class	1976	195 feet 3 inches (59.51 m)	34 feet 2 inches (10.41 m)	Unknown	925 long tons (940 t)	
Stanechakker		976	Steel	Tug - Firefighting	1978	37.98 metres (124.6 ft)	10.55 metres (34.6 ft)	4.39 metres (14.4 ft)	392 long tons (398 t)	
Swaabie		977	Steel	Tug - Firefighting	1978	37.98 metres (124.6 ft)	10.55 metres (34.6 ft)	4.39 metres (14.4 ft)	392 long tons (398 t)	
Lyrie		978	Steel	Tug - Firefighting	1978	37.98 metres (124.6 ft)	10.55 metres (34.6 ft)	4.39 metres (14.4 ft)	392 long tons (398 t)	
Tornado		979	Steel	Torpedo Recovery Vessel	1979	154 feet 5 inches (47.07 m)	31 feet 3 inches (9.53 m)	Unknown	680 long tons (690 t)	
Torch		980	Steel	Torpedo Recovery Vessel	1980	154 feet 5 inches (47.07 m)	31 feet 3 inches (9.53 m)	Unknown	680 long tons (690 t)	
Tormentor		981	Steel	Torpedo Recovery Vessel	1980	154 feet 5 inches (47.07 m)	31 feet 3 inches (9.53 m)	Unknown	680 long tons (690 t)	
Toreador		982	Steel	Torpedo Recovery Vessel	1980	154 feet 5 inches (47.07 m)	31 feet 3 inches (9.53 m)	Unknown	680 long tons (690 t)	
Anglesey		983	Steel	Fisheries Protection Vessel (Royal Navy); Island class	1979	179 feet 3 inches (54.64 m)	34 feet 2 inches (10.41 m)	Unknown	925 long tons (940 t)	
Alderney		984	Steel	Fisheries Protection Vessel (Royal Navy); Island class	1979	179 feet 3 inches (54.64 m)	34 feet 2 inches (10.41 m)	Unknown	925 long tons (940 t)	
Leeds Castle		985	Steel	Offshore Patrol Vessel (Royal Navy); Castle class	1980	266 feet (81 m)	38 feet (12 m)	11 feet (3.4 m)	1,427 long tons (1,450 t)	
Dumbarton Castle		986	Steel	Offshore Patrol Vessel (Royal Navy); Castle class	1982	266 feet (81 m)	38 feet (12 m)	11 feet (3.4 m)	1,427 long tons (1,450 t)	
Seaforth Viscount		987	Steel	Supply Vessel	1982	62.5 metres (205 ft)	13.67 metres (44.8 ft)	5 metres (16 ft)	1,199 long tons (1,218 t)	
Peacock	Peacock (as BRP Emilio Jacinto)	988	Steel	Corvette - Patrol Vessel (Royal Navy); Peacock class	1982	205 feet 3 inches (62.56 m)	32 feet 8 inches (9.96 m)	Unknown	662 long tons (673 t)	
Plover	Plover (as BRP Apolinario Mabini)	989	Steel	Corvette - Patrol Vessel (Royal Navy); Peacock class	1984	205 feet 3 inches (62.56 m)	32 feet 8 inches (9.96 m)	Unknown	662 long tons (673 t)	
Starling	Starling (as BRP Artemio Ricarte)	990	Steel	Corvette - Patrol Vessel (Royal Navy); Peacock class	1984	205 feet 3 inches (62.56 m)	32 feet 8 inches (9.96 m)	Unknown	662 long tons (673 t)	
Swallow	Swallow (as LE Ciara)	991	Steel	Corvette - Patrol Vessel (Royal Navy); Peacock class	1984	205 feet 3 inches (62.56 m)	32 feet 8 inches (9.96 m)	Unknown	662 long tons (673 t)	
Swift	Swift (as LE Orla)	992	Steel	Corvette - Patrol Vessel (Royal Navy); Peacock class	1985	205 feet 3 inches (62.56 m)	32 feet 8 inches (9.96 m)	Unknown	662 long tons (673 t)	
Salmoor	RMAS Salmoor	993	Steel	Mooring and Salvage Vessel	1985	77 metres (253 ft)	15 metres (49 ft)	4 metres (13 ft)	2,200 long tons (2,200 t)	
Salmaster		994	Steel	Mooring and Salvage Vessel	1985	77 metres (253 ft)	15 metres (49 ft)	4 metres (13 ft)	2,200 long tons (2,200 t)	
Salmaid		995	Steel	Mooring and Salvage Vessel	1986	77 metres (253 ft)	15 metres (49 ft)	4 metres (13 ft)	2,200 long tons (2,200 t)	
as AP Appledore (Aberdeen)
St. Helena	RMS St. Helena	1000	Steel	Combiliner (Passenger & Freight)	1990	105 metres (344 ft)	19.2 metres (63 ft)	6 metres (20 ft)	6,767 long tons (6,876 t)	

List of Hall, Russell & Company - significant rebuilds
Name	Image	Yard Number	Construction	Type	Year	Length Overall	Breadth	Depth	Tonnage	Ref(s)
Ballantine		996	Steel - Fit out only	Supply Vessel (Cancelled)	1986	65.64 metres (215.4 ft)	13.80 metres (45.3 ft)	6.030 metres (19.78 ft)	1,599 long tons (1,625 t)	
St. Sunniva		997	Steel - Conversion only	Ferry - Ro-Ro	1987	94 metres (308 ft)	18 metres (59 ft)	11 metres (36 ft)	4,211 long tons (4,279 t)	
Buffalo		999	Steel - Conversion only	Cargo Vessel	1988	155 metres (509 ft)	19.05 metres (62.5 ft)	5.77 metres (18.9 ft)	12,879 tonnes (12,676 long tons)	

== Notes ==
- Yard Numbers 923, 952 and 968 unused, likely cancelled.
- Yard Numbers 996, 997 and 999 were allocated for significant refurbishment and conversion contracts, rather than complete builds (detailed above).
- Yard Number 996 Ballantine never completed - partially completed hull imported from Norway in 1991, project cancelled after customer was declared bankrupt, partially completed hull sent to Husumer Schiffswerft for completion.
- Yard Number 998 allocated to Sabine in 1989, order cancelled.

== Bibliography ==
- Bush, Steve (2005). British Warships and Auxiliaries. Liskeard, Cornwall: Maritime Books. ISBN 1-904459-11-0.
