= HMS Fiona =

At least two ships of the Royal Navy have borne the name HMS Fiona:

- HMS Fiona (1905) was an armed boarding steamer in the First World War. She was wrecked in 1917.
- HMS Fiona (1927) was an armed boarding vessel in the Second World War. She was sunk by air attack in 1941.
- RMAS Fiona (A148) was a Felicity-class water tractor – akin to a tug – in service during the 1980s
