= RMAS Newton =

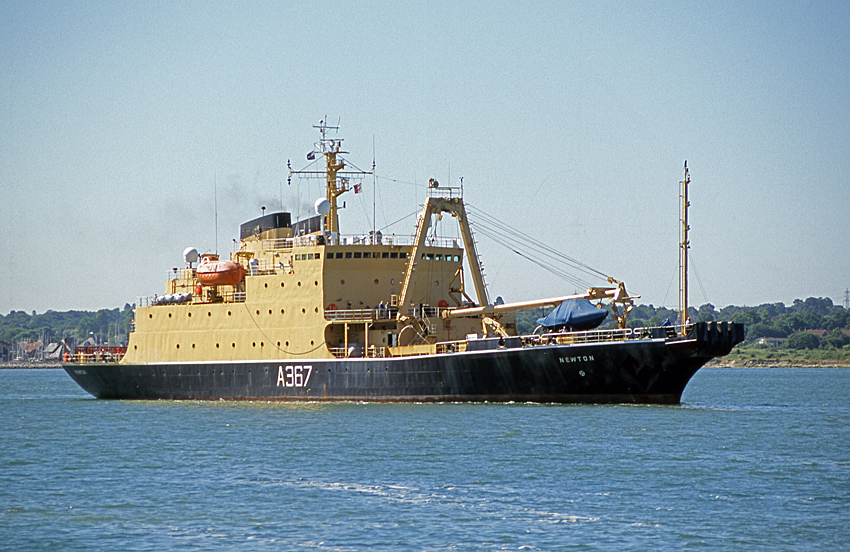
- RMAS Newton on Southampton Water

History

United Kingdom
- Name: 1976–2008 Newton; 2008–2012 SD Newton
- Namesake: Isaac Newton
- Owner: 1976–2008 RMAS; 2008–2012 Serco
- Builder: Scott Lithgow
- Yard number: 739
- Launched: 25 June 1975
- Commissioned: 18 June 1976
- Identification: Pennant number: A367; IMO number: 7342940
- Fate: Scrapped 2012

General characteristics
- Type: Research vessel
- Displacement: 4,510 t (4,440 long tons; 4,970 short tons)
- Length: 99 m (324 ft 10 in)
- Beam: 16 m (52 ft 6 in)
- Draught: 6 m (19 ft 8 in)
- Propulsion: Diesel-electric
- Speed: 13.5 kn (25.0 km/h; 15.5 mph)

RMAS Newton was an underwater research vessel with limited provision for cable laying. She was originally used for sonar propagation trials.

== History ==
RMAS Newton was built at Scott Lithgow Ltd's yard at Greenock. She had three Mirrlees Blackstone 1,450 hp (1,080 kW) diesel engines driving GEC generators for propulsion through a single screw and the ship's electrical supply. This gave her a service speed of 13.5 kn (25.0 km/h; 15.5 mph). To aid manoeuvrability at low speed she had a nozzle rudder and a bow thruster. She was launched on 25 June 1975 and taken into service one year later, on 18 June 1976.

In 2000, she underwent a major refit which included replacing her Mirlees engines with Ruston RK 215 units. At the same time her cable handling equipment was removed. Subsequently, she was used as a training and support vessel for special forces. In 2005, she underwent a further refit at Birkenhead.

On 1 April 2008, she was taken over by Serco who operated her until 2010 when she was replaced by SD Victoria. In 2012 she was sent to Ghent for scrapping.
