= SD Bustler =

Tugboat

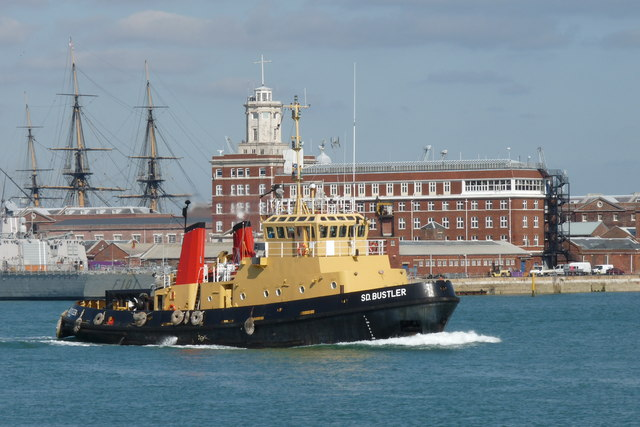
- RMAS Bustler at HMNB Portsmouth, 2009

History

United Kingdom
- Name: RMAS Bustler
- Builder: Richard Dunston
- Launched: 1981
- In service: 1981
- Out of service: 2008
- Homeport: HMNB Portsmouth
- Identification: Pennant number: A225
- Fate: Transferred to Serco Marine Services

United Kingdom
- Name: SD Bustler
- In service: 2008
- Identification: IMO number: 7902336; MMSI number: 613002861; Callsign: GZAX
- Status: Retired

General characteristics
- Tonnage: 384 GT
- Length: 38.8 m (127 ft 4 in)
- Beam: 9.42 m (30 ft 11 in)
- Draught: 4 m (13 ft 1 in)
- Propulsion: Two diesels, two shafts, 2,640 bhp
- Speed: 12 kn (22 km/h; 14 mph)
- Complement: 5

SD Bustler was a twin tractor unit tug operated by Serco Marine Services in support of the United Kingdom's Naval Service. The ship was formerly operated by the Royal Maritime Auxiliary Service until its disbandment in March 2008.

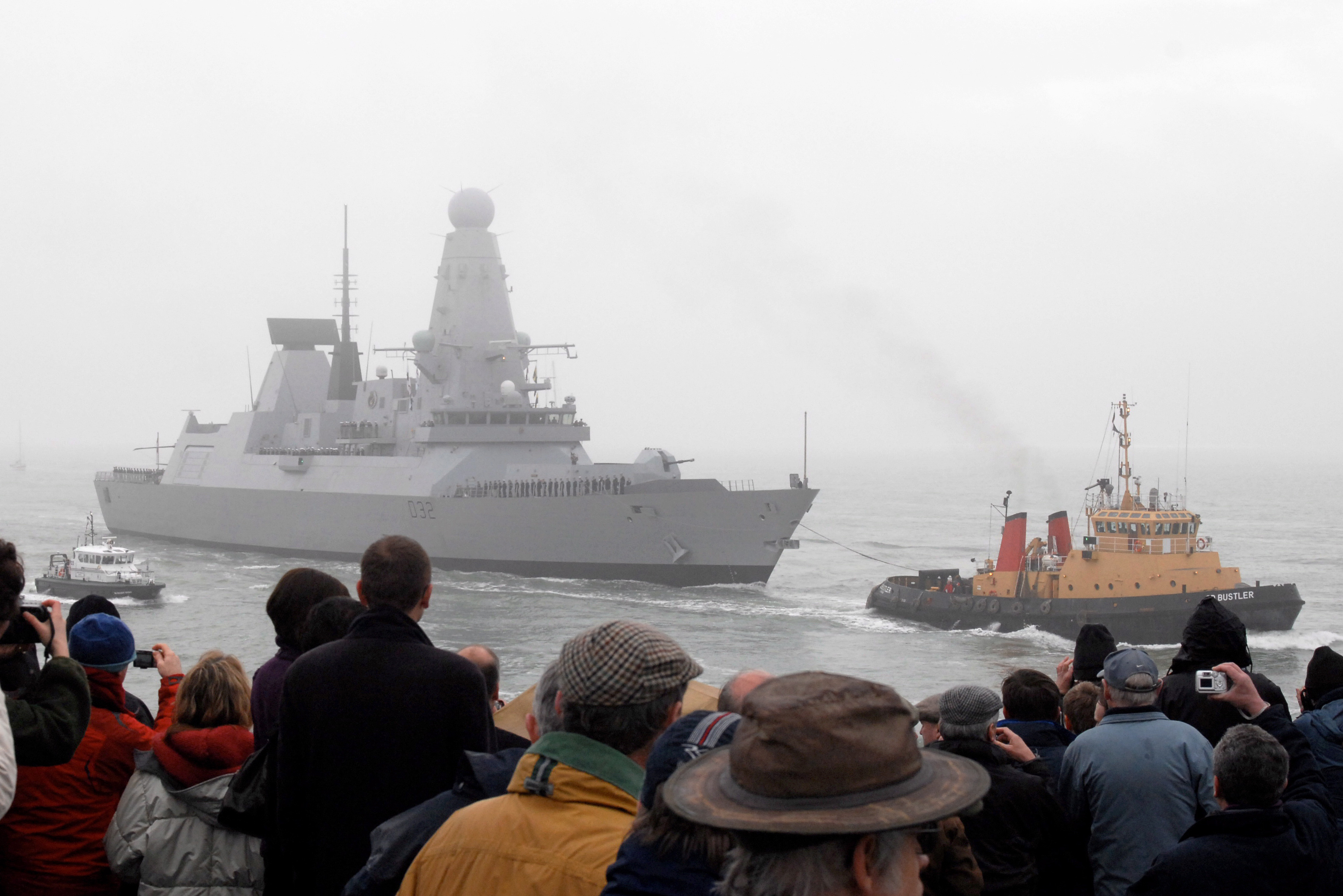
SD Bustler towing HMS Daring as the destroyer enters HMNB Portsmouth for the first time

== See also ==
- Naval Service (United Kingdom)
- List of ships of Serco Marine Services
