= SD Nimble =

History

United Kingdom
- Name: RMAS Nimble (A222)
- Builder: Richard Dunston
- Launched: 1985
- In service: 1985
- Out of service: 2008
- Status: Transferred to Serco Marine Services

United Kingdom
- Name: SD Nimble
- In service: 2008
- Out of service: Unknown
- Identification: IMO number: 8401470; MMSI number: 232312017; Callsign: GAAF
- Status: sold to commercial interests for further use

General characteristics
- Tonnage: 384 GT
- Length: 38.8 m (127 ft 4 in)
- Beam: 9.42 m (30 ft 11 in)
- Draught: 4 m (13 ft 1 in)
- Propulsion: Two diesels, two shafts, 2,640 bhp
- Speed: 12 kn (22 km/h; 14 mph)
- Complement: 5

SD Nimble was a Twin Tractor Unit Tug operated by Serco Marine Services in support of the United Kingdom's Naval Service. The ship was operated by the Royal Maritime Auxiliary Service until its disbandment in March 2008.

== See also ==
- Naval Service (United Kingdom)
- List of ships of Serco Marine Services
