= SD Powerful =

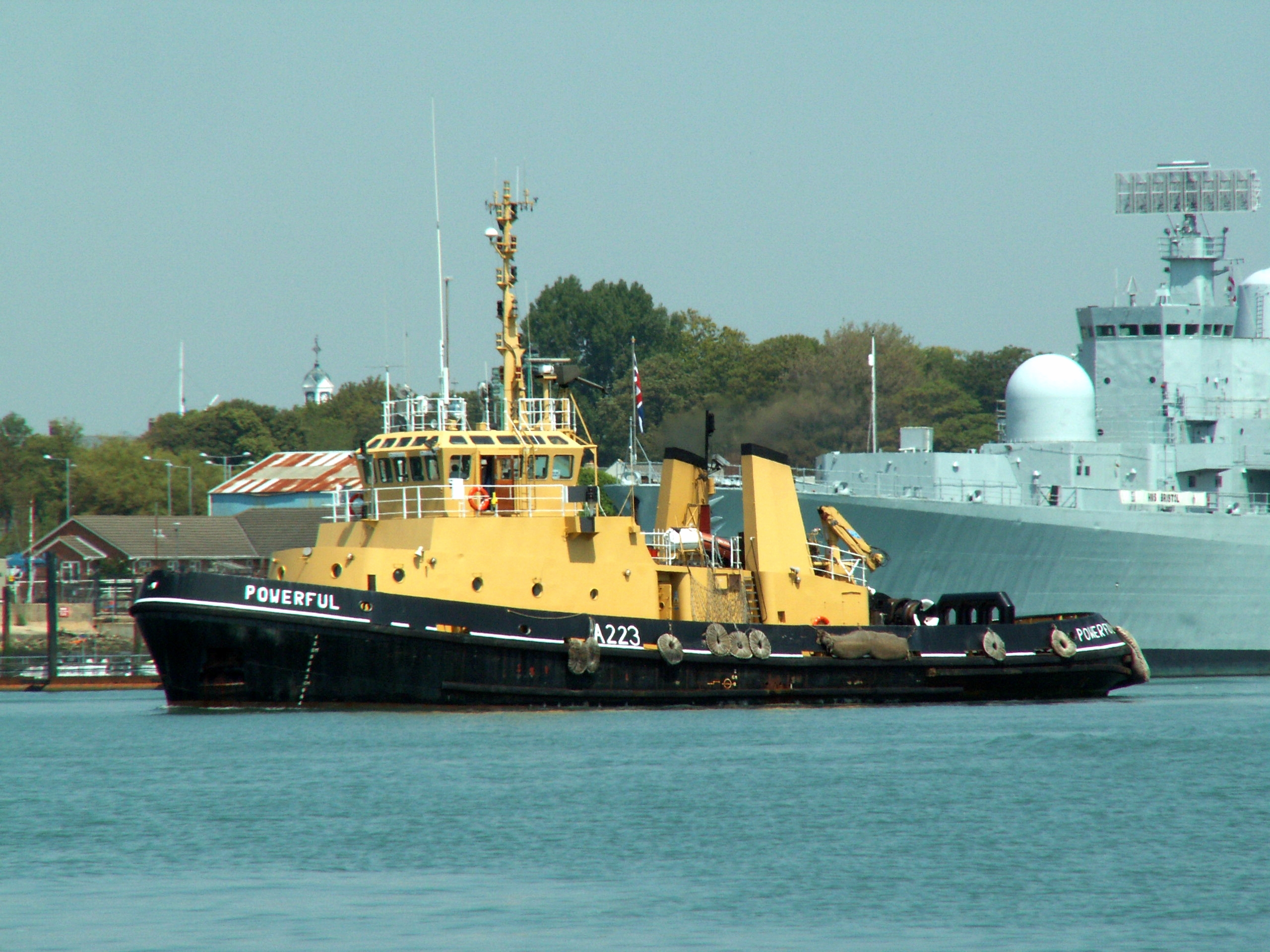
- RMAS Powerful at HMNB Portsmouth, 2006

History

United Kingdom
- Name: RMAS Powerful (A223)
- Builder: Richard Dunston
- Launched: 1985
- In service: 1985
- Out of service: 2008
- Homeport: HMNB Portsmouth
- Status: Transferred to Serco Marine Services

United Kingdom
- Name: SD Powerful
- In service: 2008
- Homeport: HMNB Devonport
- Identification: IMO number: 8401482; MMSI number: 232002939; Callsign: GAAG
- Status: Active

General characteristics
- Tonnage: 384 GT
- Length: 38.8 m (127 ft 4 in)
- Beam: 9.42 m (30 ft 11 in)
- Draught: 4 m (13 ft 1 in)
- Propulsion: Two diesels, two shafts, 2,640 bhp
- Speed: 12 kn (22 km/h; 14 mph)
- Complement: 5

SD Powerful is a Twin Tractor Unit Tug operated by Serco Marine Services in support of the United Kingdom's Naval Service. The tug, built in 1985, was formerly operated by the Royal Maritime Auxiliary Service until its disbandment in March 2008.

== See also ==
- Naval Service (United Kingdom)
- List of ships of Serco Marine Services
