= SD Faithful =

History

United Kingdom
- Name: RMAS Faithful (A228)
- Builder: Richard Dunston
- Launched: 1985
- In service: 1985
- Out of service: 2008
- Homeport: HMNB Devonport
- Status: Transferred to Serco Marine Services

United Kingdom
- Name: SD Faithful
- In service: 2008
- Identification: IMO number: 8401494; MMSI number: 232002651; Callsign: GAAH
- Status: Active

General characteristics
- Tonnage: 384 GT
- Length: 38.8 m (127 ft 4 in)
- Beam: 9.42 m (30 ft 11 in)
- Draught: 4 m (13 ft 1 in)
- Propulsion: Two diesels, two shafts, 2,640 bhp
- Speed: 12 kn (22 km/h; 14 mph)
- Complement: 5

SD Faithful is a Twin Tractor Unit Tug operated by Serco Marine Services in support of the United Kingdom's Naval Service. The ship was formerly operated by the Royal Maritime Auxiliary Service until its disbandment in March 2008. The vessel was originally built for the Royal Maritime Auxiliary Service in 1985.

== See also ==
- Naval Service (United Kingdom)
- List of ships of Serco Marine Services
