= Subordinate officer =

Grade of military officer

Subordinate officer is a term used in some armed forces for a grade of officer above a non-commissioned officer but still not actually commissioned, usually still in training. Such officers are treated for most intents and purposes as commissioned officers.

== Canada ==
In the Canadian Forces, subordinate officers (French: officiers subordonnés) as a group consist of the Army and Air Force ranks of Officer Cadet (OCdt) and the Navy's Naval Cadet (NCdt); the French language equivalents are Élève-officier (élof) and Aspirant de marine (aspm), respectively.

The subordinate officer's rank insignia is a single narrow strip of gold braid worn on the cuff of the Service Dress jacket, or on slip-ons on the shoulders of other uniforms. Unlike that of commissioned officers, the peak of the service dress cap (if worn) is plain, identical to that of non-commissioned members (NCMs). However, cap badges and other accoutrements are those of commissioned officers which are different from those of NCMs. In the Royal Canadian Navy, Elliot's Eye (the Executive Curl) is absent from the visible rank.

Subordinate officers are addressed as "Sir" or "Ma'am" by non-commissioned members, and by rank and name by superior officers. As they do not hold commissions they are not required to be saluted. They may however hold positions of authority, either in an acting capacity or for training purposes, such as second-in-command of a platoon, under the close supervision of a superior officer.

== United Kingdom ==
In the Royal Navy, Royal Naval Volunteer Reserve and Royal Naval Reserve, subordinate officers included Acting Sub-Lieutenants, Midshipmen and Naval Cadets, as well as Probationary Second Lieutenants of the Royal Marines. They held their ranks by Admiralty Board orders. They were officers for the purposes of the Naval Discipline Act 1957 and the Queen's Regulations for the Royal Navy, and were entitled to be saluted and to be addressed as "Sir" by ratings and addressed as "Mr" by superior officers. They also wore officer uniform, although with a smaller cap badge until April 1927, when it was made the same size as that of commissioned officers. In 1972, all cadets became midshipmen when the rank of cadet was abolished.

From 1925, all masters, mates and engineers 1st and 2nd class of the Admiralty Yard Craft Service held the courtesy status of subordinate officer.

Subordinate Officer was also the most junior rank in HM Prison Service. Until late 1922, it was divided into Divisions II and I. It is now simply called Prison Officer.

In France the rank of Aspirant given to cadets finishing their training is a subordinate officer rank.

== See also ==
- Comparative military ranks
- Officer Designate
- Warrant officer (United States)
