= Government Service Ensign =

Defaced Blue Ensign flown by British vessels

Government Service Ensign

The Government Service Ensign is a defaced Blue Ensign flown by vessels owned by the British Ministry of Defence for which no other ensign is appropriate. It is most commonly seen flown by warships undergoing contractors' trials before being commissioned into the Royal Navy, and former Royal Maritime Auxiliary Service (RMAS) vessels now operated by Serco Denholm.

Government Service Jack

The Government Service Jack is a square flag of similar design.

== History ==
When the Royal Navy was re-organized in 1864, and the Red, Blue and White squadrons were abolished, a Blue Ensign defaced with a horizontal anchor and known as the Admiralty Ensign was designated the ensign of all Royal Navy auxiliary vessels owned by the Admiralty. In 1905, the Royal Fleet Auxiliary (RFA) was formed, and was directed to fly this flag.

In 1969, the RFA was awarded its own ensign, similar to the Admiralty Ensign, but with a vertical anchor. The current design was approved by Queen Elizabeth II in 1968 and introduced from 16 June 1969.

Up to that time, some captains of merchant ships commissioned into naval service had flown the Red Ensign.

In 1970, two yellow wavy lines were added below the Admiralty Ensign's horizontal anchor for vessels of the Royal Maritime Auxiliary Service (RMAS). In 1974, the Admiralty Ensign was renamed the Government Service Ensign (a.k.a. the Government Service Blue Ensign) and was flown by all Ministry of Defence-owned vessels that were not part of the Royal Navy, RFA or RMAS, as well as certain Government operated vessels for which no other ensign was appropriate. In 1996, most RMAS vessels were transferred to Serco Denholm, which operated them under a commercial contract, flying the Government Service Ensign. In 2008, the RMAS ensign became obsolete as all remaining RMAS vessels were transferred to Serco Denholm and the RMAS was abolished.

The Government Service Ensign is now worn by the many ex-RMAS craft under the management of Serco Denholm, sail training craft, Britannia Royal Naval College Dartmouth training vessels and certain vessels under charter (i.e. at one time including motor vessels Northella and Colonel Templer). Also tenders to establishments (i.e. the now de-commissioned Sultan Venturer) and diving tenders (i.e. Ixworth).

== See also ==
- British Ensigns
- List of flags
