= Felicity-class water tractor =

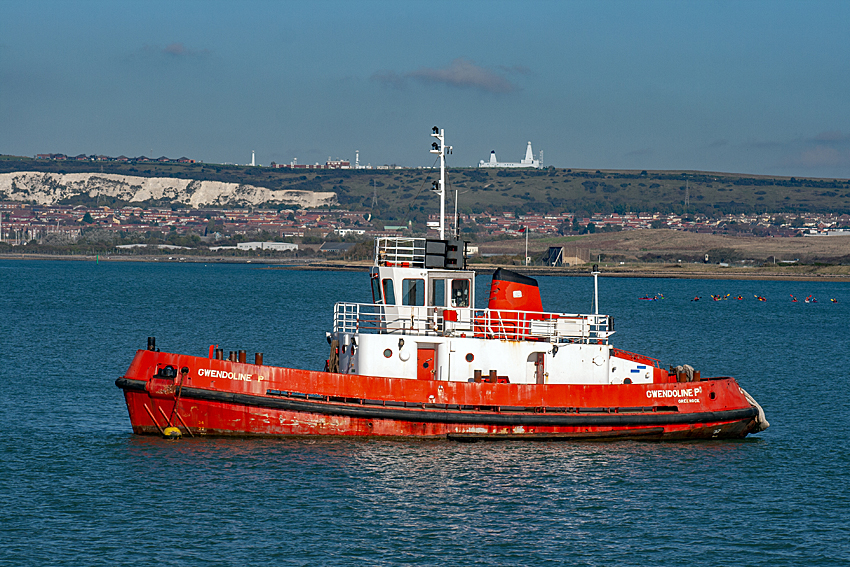
- A196 Gwendoline laid up in Portsmouth Harbour

Class overview
- Builders: Richard Dunston; Hancocks SB Co, Pembroke Dock
- Operators: Royal Maritime Auxiliary Service; Serco Marine Services
- Built: 1973–1980
- In service: 1973–present
- Completed: 8
- Active: 4

General characteristics
- Tonnage: 89 GRT
- Length: 22 m (72 ft 2 in)
- Beam: 6.4 m (21 ft 0 in)
- Draught: 2.6 m (8 ft 6 in)
- Speed: 10 kn (19 km/h; 12 mph)
- Complement: 4

The Felicity class is a class of water tractors (or tug boats) operated by Serco Marine Services in support of the United Kingdom's Naval Service. Historically the vessels were operated by the Royal Maritime Auxiliary Service, disbanded in March 2008.

== Vessels in the class ==
Name	Pendant Number	In Commission	Builder	Notes
Felicity	A112	1969–1997	Dunston	Sold to Itchen Marine and renamed Wyepress. Sold to Baker Marine in 2004 and renamed Susan
Frances	A147	1980–2008	Dunston	To Serco
Florence	A149	1980–2008	Dunston	To Serco
Fiona	A148	1973–2007	Hancocks	Sold to Macrae Marine
Genevieve	A150	1980–2008	Hancocks	To Serco
Georgina	A152	1973–1996	Hancocks	To Serco
Gwendoline	A196	1973–1996	Hancocks	To Serco as Gwendoline P
Helen	A198	1974–2008	Hancocks	To Serco

== See also ==
- List of ships of Serco Marine Services
