= A187 =

A187 may refer to:

- A187 road in England from Heaton, Newcastle to North Shields
- HMS Forth (A187), Royal Navy submarine depot ship
- RMAS Salmaid (A187), Royal Navy Sal-Class mooring and salvage vessel
