= SD Victoria =

British ship, built 2010

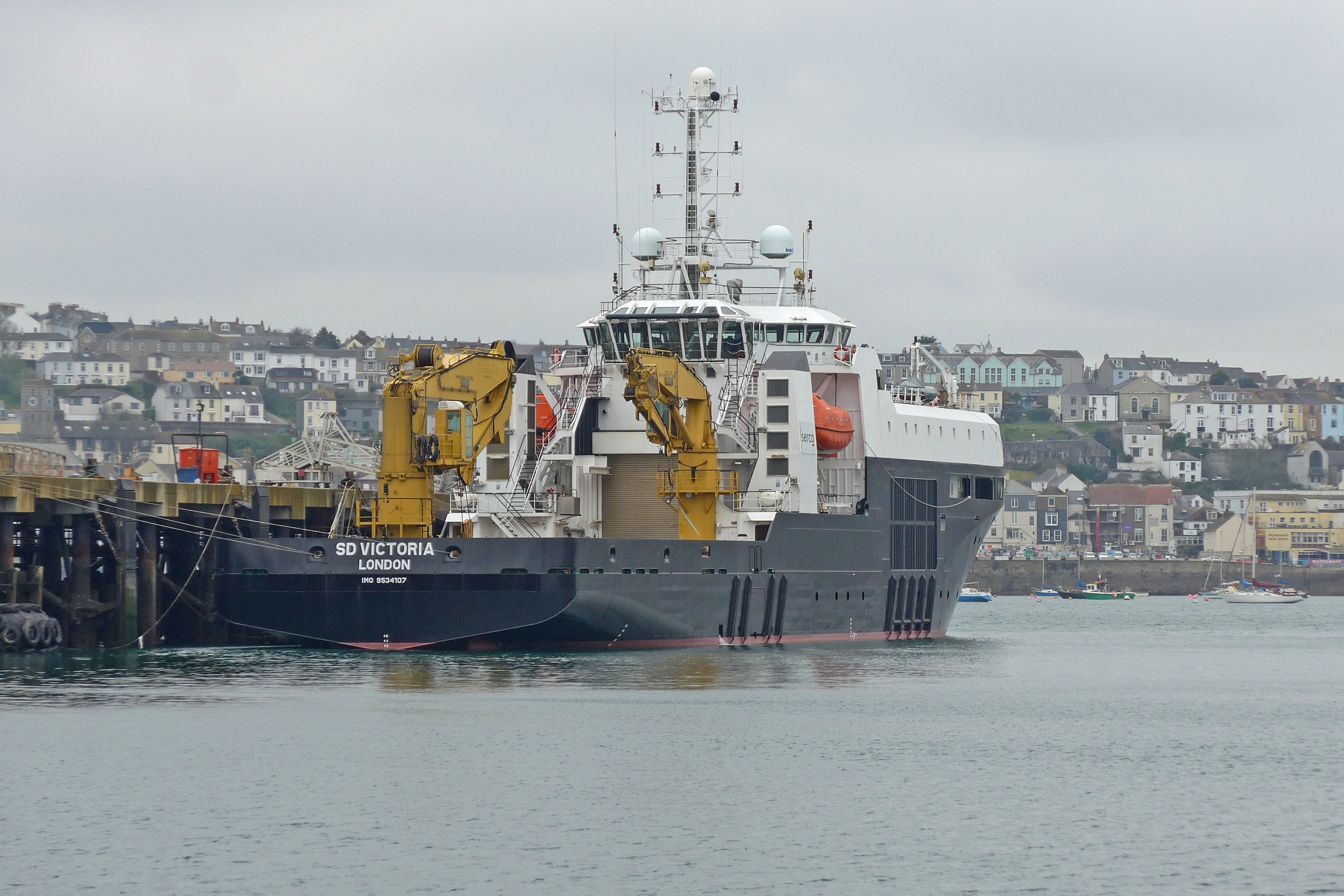
- Offshore supply ship SD Victoria, at Falmouth

History

United Kingdom
- Name: SD Victoria
- Namesake: Queen Victoria
- Launched: 2010
- In service: 25 May 2010
- Identification: IMO number: 9534107; MMSI number: 235068802; Callsign: 2BRX2
- Status: Active

General characteristics
- Class & type: Worldwide support ship
- Tonnage: 3,522 GT
- Length: 83 m (272 ft 4 in)
- Beam: 16 m (52 ft 6 in)
- Draught: 4.5 m (14 ft 9 in)
- Propulsion: Two Caterpillar 3516B diesels driving two shafts with controllable pitch propellers
- Speed: 14 kn (26 km/h; 16 mph)
- Complement: 16 crew (accommodation for up to 72)
- Aviation facilities: Helicopter winching deck
- Notes: Flat work deck; Cranes

SD Victoria is a worldwide support ship operated by Serco Marine Services in support of the United Kingdom's Naval Service, and currently the second largest ship operated by Serco Marine Services, after SD Northern River.

Her duties involve supporting training operations and transporting military personnel and equipment around the world. SD Victoria has also been photographed carrying Specialist Craft operated by the Special Boat Service.

On board, SD Victoria is equipped with several operations and briefing rooms. She reportedly employs a crew of some 16 personnel and is able to accommodate up to 72 troops as well as Fast Interceptor Craft (FIC).

== See also ==
- Naval Service (United Kingdom)
- List of ships of Serco Marine Services
