= SD Tempest =

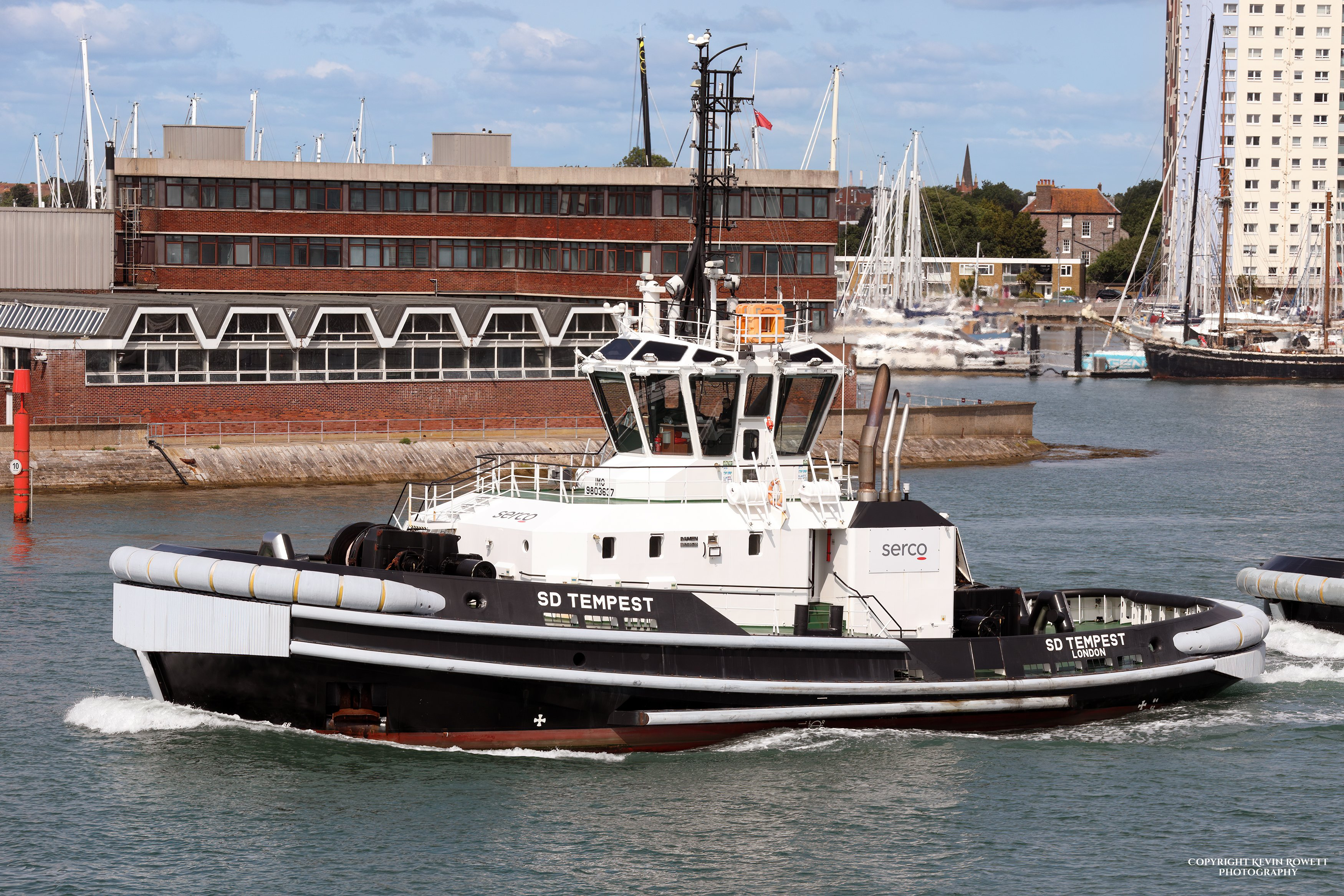

History

United Kingdom
- Name: SD Tempest
- Ordered: February 2016
- Builder: Damen, Gdańsk
- Launched: 2016
- In service: 2017
- Home port: HMNB Portsmouth
- Identification: IMO number: 9803637; MMSI number: 235118697; Callsign: 2JTB4
- Status: In service

General characteristics
- Tonnage: 495 GT
- Length: 32.9 m (107 ft 11 in)
- Beam: 12.6 m (41 ft 4 in)
- Draught: 6.5 m (21 ft 4 in)
- Propulsion: 3 Caterpillar 3512C diesels
- Speed: 13 kn (24 km/h; 15 mph)
- Complement: 4

SD Tempest is an ART 8032-class tug operated by Serco Marine Services in support of the United Kingdom's Naval Service. SD Tempest was ordered specifically to handle the Queen Elizabeth-class aircraft carriers. However, the vessel also performs general harbour towage when not required in her primary role.

Normally based in Portsmouth, SD Tempest was temporarily transferred to Rosyth in June 2017 to assist with HMS Queen Elizabeth's departure on sea trials.

== See also ==
- Naval Service (United Kingdom)
- List of ships of Serco Marine Services
