= Colonel Templer =

Colonel Templer may refer to:

- RMAS Colonel Templer (A229), an acoustic research vessel of the Royal Maritime Auxiliary Service
- James Templer (balloon aviator), a colonel in the British Army
