= Director-class tugboat =

Director class
Class overview
- Operators: Royal Maritime Auxiliary Service
- Built: 1956–1958
- Planned: 7
- Completed: 7
- Scrapped: 7

General characteristics
- Length: 157 ft (48 m)
- Beam: 30 ft (9.1 m); 60 ft (18 m) over sponsons
- Draught: 12 ft (3.7 m)
- Installed power: Paxman Diesel 12 YHAXZ
- Propulsion: electrically driven paddle wheels
- Speed: 13 knots (24 km/h; 15 mph)
- Range: 5,900 mi (9,500 km)
- Complement: 22

The Director class was a class of diesel-electric paddle tugboats ordered by the British Admiralty's Royal Maritime Auxiliary Service and constructed in 1957–1958. Each paddle wheel was driven by an individual electric motor, giving outstanding manoeuvrability. Paddle tugs were able to more easily make use of the inherent advantage of side wheel paddle propulsion, having the option to disconnect the clutches that connected the paddle drive shafts as one. This enabled them to turn one paddle ahead and one astern to turn and manoeuvre quickly.

The class was principally designed to assist the Royal Navy's aircraft carriers when manoeuvring in port. The masts were designed to fold to allow the tugs to operate under the overhang of the flight deck. They were also equipped for fire fighting and salvage as well as combatting oil spills.

== List of ships ==
Name	Pennant No.	Station	In service	Withdrawn	Fate	Builder
Dexterous	A93	Gibraltar	1957			Yarrow Shipbuilders
Director	A94	Malta	1957	1980	Scrapped in Spain	Yarrow Shipbuilders
Faithful	A85	Devonport	1957			Yarrow Shipbuilders
Favourite	A87	Devonport	1959			Ferguson Bros
Forceful	A86	Portsmouth	1957			Yarrow Shipbuilders
Grinder	A92	Portsmouth	1958			William Simons and Co
Griper	A89	Portsmouth	1958			William Simons and Co
