= RMAS Colonel Templer =

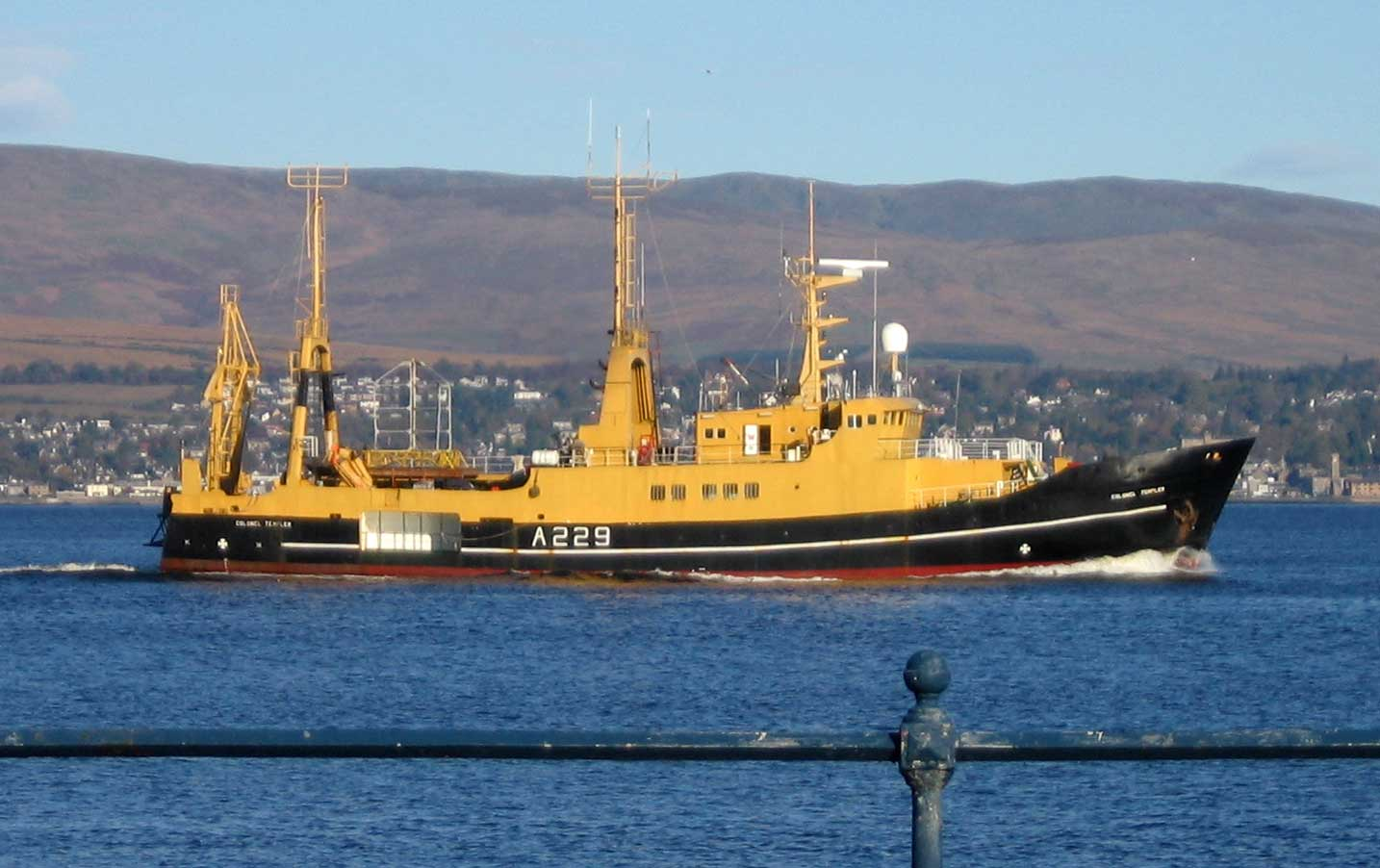
- RMAS Colonel Templer on the Firth of Clyde, 2006

History

United Kingdom
- Name: MV Criscilla
- Builder: Hall, Russell & Company
- Yard number: 931
- Launched: 16 September 1966
- In service: 1966
- Out of service: 1980
- Fate: Sold to the Royal Aircraft Establishment, renamed Colonel Templer

United Kingdom
- Name: Colonel Templer
- Namesake: Colonel James Templer
- Operator: Royal Aircraft Establishment; Defence Evaluation and Research Agency
- In service: 1980
- Out of service: 2000
- Fate: Transferred to the Royal Maritime Auxiliary Service

United Kingdom
- Name: RMAS Colonel Templer (A229)
- Operator: Royal Maritime Auxiliary Service
- In service: 2000
- Out of service: 2008
- Home port: HMNB Clyde
- Fate: Transferred to Serco Marine Services

United Kingdom
- Name: SD Colonel Templer
- Operator: Serco Marine Services
- In service: 2008
- Out of service: 2011
- Identification: IMO number: 6619944; MMSI number: 671330000; Callsign: 5VBX3
- Fate: Sold to a Swedish shipping firm and renamed Seaway Endeavour

General characteristics
- Displacement: 1,300 tonnes
- Length: 56 m
- Beam: 11 m
- Draught: 5.6 m
- Speed: 12 knots
- Complement: 14

SD Colonel Templer (previously RMAS Colonel Templer (A229)) is an acoustic research vessel, renamed Seaway Endeavour in 2011 after she was sold to a Swedish shipping company. Between 1980 and 2011, she was in the service of the Royal Aircraft Establishment, the Royal Maritime Auxiliary Service and Serco Marine Services in support of the United Kingdom's Naval Service. Before 1980, Colonel Templer was known as MV Criscilla and worked as a stern trawler.

Her displacement is 1,300 tonnes and dimensions 56 m by 11 m by 5.6 m. Her complement is 14 and speed 12 knots. Twelve scientists can be carried.

== Ships history ==
The ship was built in 1966 by Hall, Russell & Company for J Marr and Sons of Hull. At the time she served as a stern trawler named MV Criscilla.

In 1978, she was sold to the Royal Aircraft Establishment, Farnborough and renamed Colonel Templer after Colonel James Templer, an early British military pioneer of balloons and superintendent of the Aldershot balloon factory. She was converted into an acoustic research vessel. in 1989 she was transferred to the Defence Evaluation and Research Agency.

There was a serious fire 22 January 1991 caused by cutting a hole through a bulkhead, she was intentionally flooded to extinguish the fire, capsizing in dock. The ship underwent a major rebuild 1990/91. In April, 1997 converted to diesel electric propulsion, two Cummins V-12s coupled to 1324 kw electric motors with counter rotating propellers. First vessel certified by Lloyd's for unlimited service with such single propulsion system. In November 2000, Colonel Templer was handed over to the Royal Maritime Auxiliary Service (RMAS) and operated under contract by Serco Denholm, based at HMNB Clyde. In 2001, she was converted to support diving training with the Royal Navy. Following the disbandment of the RMAS in March 2008, Colonel Templer was transferred to Serco Marine Services and received the ship prefix 'SD'.

In July 2011, she was sold to a Swedish firm, or sold to Seaways Survey & Recovery, Miami, Florida, and renamed Seaway Endeavour with a blue and white livery, and registered in Panama. or sold to Seaways Survey & recovery, Miami, Florida.. By April, 2012 renamed RSV Endeavour. By November 2012 registered in Lomé, Togo, as Endeavour. 2015 sold to Halstorm Investment Group. 23 November, 2016 laid up in Glasgow, Scotland.

== See also ==
- Naval Service (United Kingdom)
- List of ships of Serco Marine Services
