= Sand, Applecross =

Cave and archaeological site in the United Kingdom

Sand
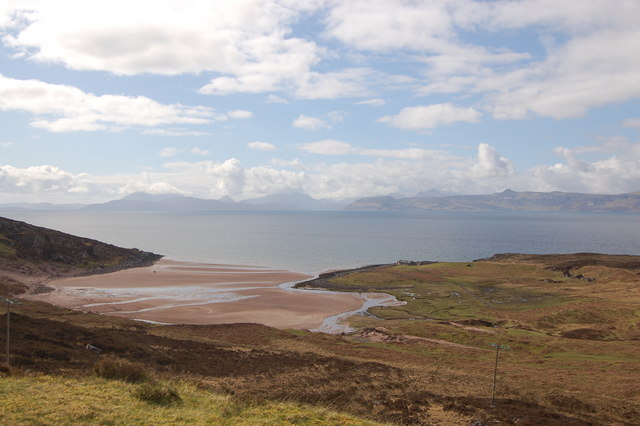
- Sand Bay and the Inner Sound

- location in Scotland Sand, Applecross (the United Kingdom)
- 57°28′13″N 5°52′0″W
- Type: rock shelter
- Location: Applecross Peninsula
- Region: Wester Ross, Scotland

Site notes
- Excavation dates: 1999, 2000
- Archaeologists: Scotland’s First Settlers project (SFS)

Sand is an archaeological site on the Applecross Peninsula in Wester Ross, Scotland.

Sand is the site of a major archaeological excavation on the Inner Sound coast of the Applecross Peninsula in Western Scotland, to the north of the small town of Applecross.

A small number of shell middens were known as rare traces of Mesolithic settlement when a rock shelter and shell midden at Sand, Applecross on the coast of Wester Ross, Scotland, was selected for detailed excavation as part of a study of shell middens in the area around the Inner Sound between the Skye and the mainland.

The Scotland’s First Settlers project (SFS) investigating the relationship of early inhabitants with the western seaboard chose this area which had known sites at An Corran in Staffin, Skye, and at Redpoint and Shieldaig in Torridon. Their surveys in 1999 and 2000 found 104 previously unknown sites, mostly caves and rock shelters with 21 "lithic scatters" and 9 open shell middens. A proportion of these sites will be more recent, but test pits at 4 sites found Loch a Sguirr on Raasay and Sand in Applecross to be Mesolithic. The indication is that there are many more surviving sites than had been expected.

The rock shelter site at Sand on the Applecross peninsula, just to the north of Applecross itself, faces out across the Inner Sound westwards towards Skye and Raasay. Around 7,500 years BCE the first users of the rock shelter had worked antler and stone to make tools. As well as using local stone for their tools they had obtained distinctive stone from the island of Rùm, 30 km (19 mi) to the south, and Staffin on Skye, 10 km (6.2 mi) to the west, showing that they were able to cross open sea.

Gradually a large pile of shells, mainly limpets, built up into a large midden. Abundant fragments of stone "pot-boilers" and bevel ended bone tools indicate that the shellfish were being cooked and the contents scooped out. There were also bones from red deer and birds and an antler harpoon for catching a wide range of fish, including cod, mackerel, haddock, herring and salmon.

Fine beads had been made from seashells, while ochre pigment and a particular species of dog whelk that may have been used for the extraction of purple dye suggest concern with decoration.

== Naval base ==
There is a British Naval Base at Sand that monitors underwater activity around this part of the west coast. The BUTEC establishment tests marine weapons. Submarines can often be seen in the waters between Applecross Peninsula and Raasay.
