= NI Mar Portugal =

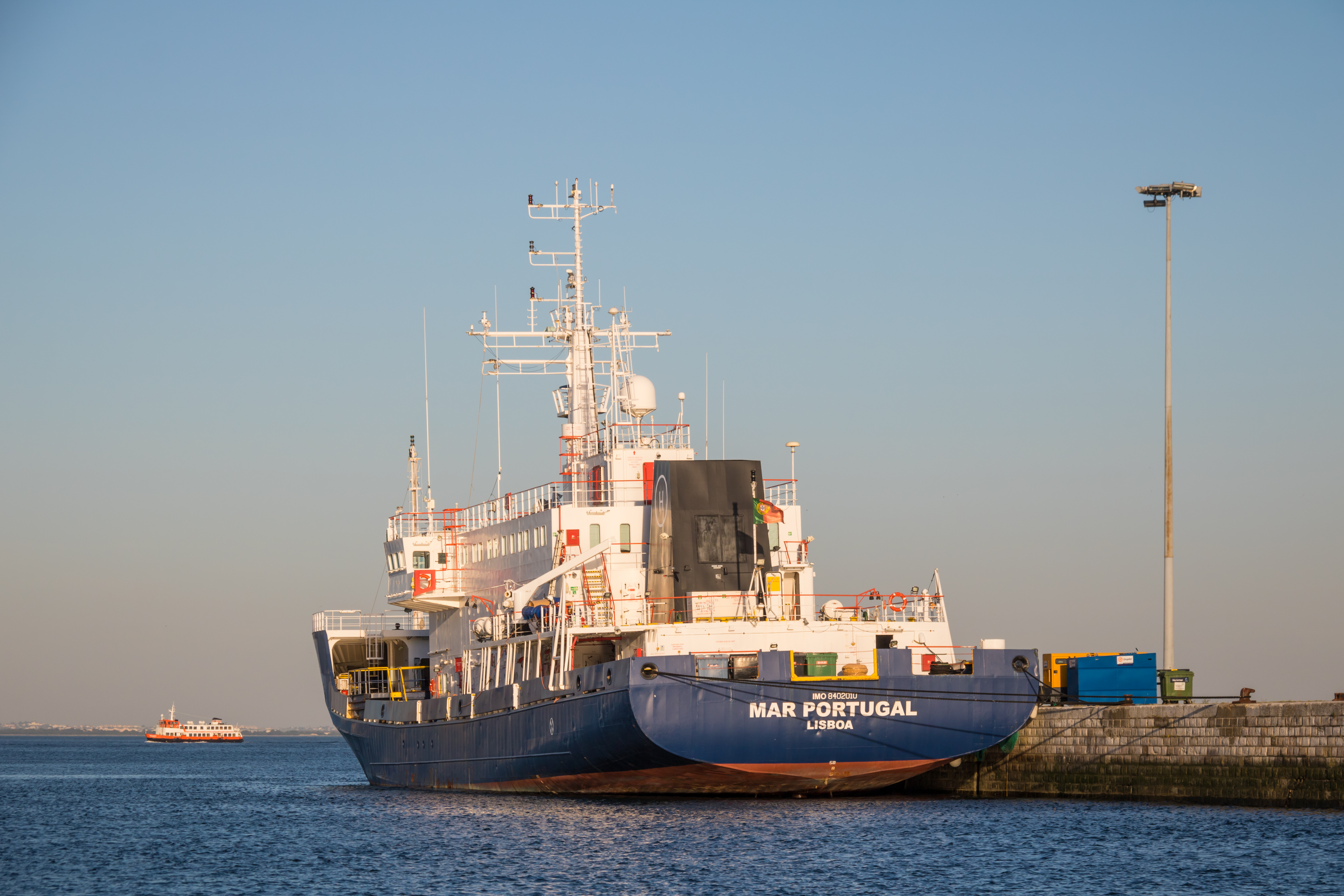
- NI Mário Ruivo

History

United Kingdom
- Name: RMAS Salmaid (A187)
- Operator: RMAS
- Builder: Hall, Russell & Company
- In service: 1986
- Out of service: 2009
- Fate: Transferred to Serco Denholm

United Kingdom
- Name: SD Salmaid
- Operator: Serco Denholm
- In service: 2009
- Out of service: 2012
- Fate: Transferred to Hays Ships

United Kingdom
- Name: Kommandor Calum
- Operator: Hays Ships
- Acquired: 2012
- In service: 2013
- Out of service: 2017
- Homeport: Leith
- Fate: Transferred to IPMA Portugal

Portugal
- Name: NI Mário Ruivo
- Owner: Portuguese Government
- Operator: IPMA
- Acquired: 2017
- Homeport: Lisbon

General characteristics
- Class & type: Research and Survey
- Displacement: 2,290 tonnes
- Length: 77 metres (253 ft)
- Beam: 15 metres (49 ft)
- Draught: 4 metres (13 ft)
- Propulsion: 2 diesels, 1 shaft, 4,000 bhp
- Speed: 15 knots (28 km/h; 17 mph)
- Complement: 19

NI Mário Ruivo, previously known as NI Mar Portugal, is a research vessel of the Portuguese Institute of the Sea and the Atmosphere (IPMA).

She was originally the RMAS Salmaid (A187), a Sal-Class mooring and salvage vessel working at HMNB Portsmouth under the Royal Maritime Auxiliary Service department of the Royal Navy. Then she was operated by Serco Denholm as the SD Salmaid. Her sister ship was the RMAS Salmoor (A185).

Built by Hall, Russell & Company in 1986, her displacement is 2,200 tonnes and dimensions 77 m by 15 m by 4 m. Her complement is 19 and speed 15 knots (28 km/h; 17 mph).

Tasks included the laying and maintenance of underwater targets, navigation marks and moorings.

She was acquired by the Scottish company Hays Ships and renamed Kommandor Calum after extensive work at a Polish Shipyard in 2012.

In 2017, she was acquired by Portugal to be operated by the Portuguese Institute of the Sea and the Atmosphere in the oceanographic research of the Atlantic Ocean.
