= RMAS Salmaster =

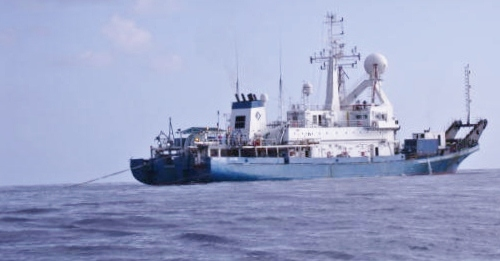
- Salmaster as Ocean Endeavour in 2013

History

United Kingdom
- Name: RMAS Salmaster (A186)
- Owner: 1986-2001 Ministry of Defence; from 2001 Gardline Shipping
- Operator: 1986-1996 Royal Maritime Auxiliary Service; 1996-1997 Serco Denholm; 1997-2001 Serco Marine Services
- Builder: Hall, Russell & Company, Aberdeen
- Launched: 12 November 1985
- Commissioned: 10 April 1986
- Identification: IMO number: 8402008

General characteristics
- Class & type: Sal-class large lifting ships
- Tonnage: 1,967 GT
- Displacement: 2,225 tonnes
- Length: 77.1 metres (253 ft)
- Beam: 14.9 metres (49 ft)
- Draught: 3.8 metres (12 ft)
- Propulsion: 2 diesels, 1 shaft, 4,000 bhp
- Speed: 15 knots (28 km/h; 17 mph)
- Complement: 19 (as Salmaster)

RMAS Salmaster (A186) was a Sal-class mooring and salvage vessel completed in 1986 for the Royal Navy and initially operated by the Royal Maritime Auxiliary Service (RMAS). She was sold in 2001 into commercial ownership.

== RMAS Salmaster ==
Salmaster was built by Hall, Russell & Company, Aberdeen, as Yard No. 994 and launched on 12 November 1985. Her displacement is 2,225 tonnes and dimensions 77.1 metres (253 ft) length, 14.9 metres (49 ft) beam and 3.8 metres (12 ft) draught. The ship was powered by two Ruston & Hornsby diesels, totalling 4,000 brake horsepower (3,000 kW), driving two screw propellers and giving a service speed of 15 knots (28 km/h; 17 mph). In naval service her complement was 19.

The ship was commissioned on 10 April 1986 with pennant number A186. Tasks included the laying and maintenance of underwater targets, navigation marks and moorings as well as marine salvage. In 1996 the operations of RMAS were transferred to Serco Denholm (a joint venture between Serco Group and British shipping company Denholm).

== Ocean Endeavour ==
Salmaster was sold in 2001 to British marine services and survey company Gardline of Great Yarmouth, converted for research and survey work, and was renamed Ocean Endeavour. As at December 2023, she is operated world-wide by Gardline Marine Sciences.
