= RMAS Salmoor =

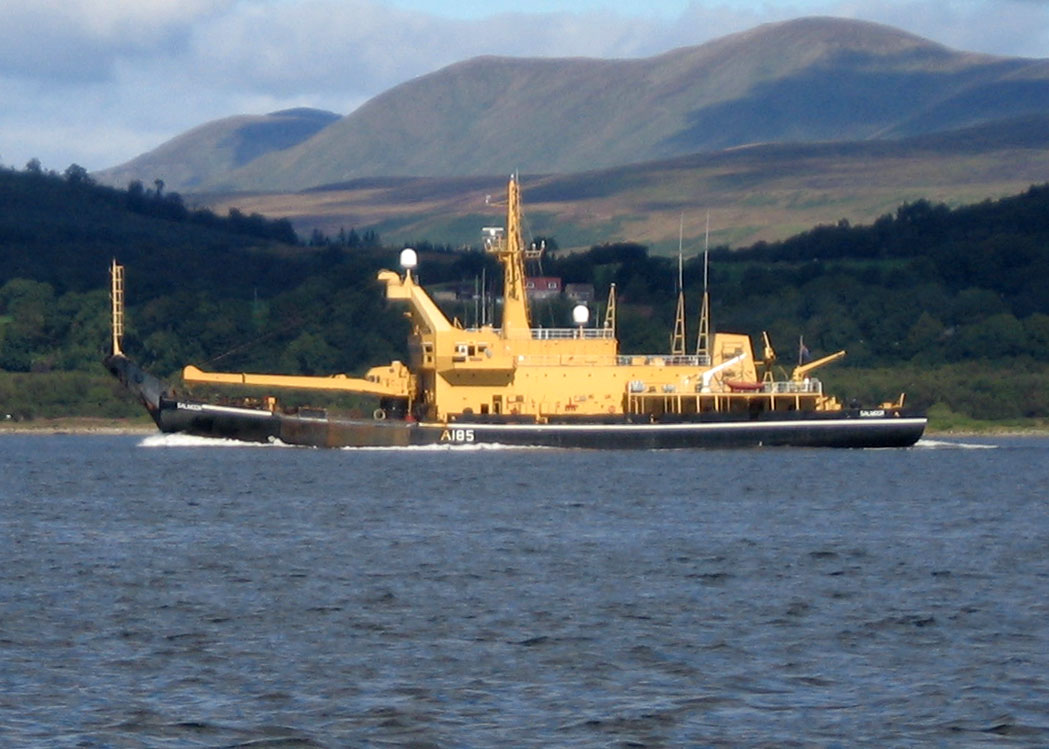
- RMAS Salmoor on the Firth of Clyde, 2006

History

United Kingdom
- Name: RMAS Salmoor (A185)
- Ordered: 31 September 1984
- Builder: Hall, Russell & Company
- Laid down: 10 January 1985
- Launched: 25 May 1985
- Commissioned: 10 September 1985
- Out of service: 2008
- Home port: HMNB Clyde
- Status: Transferred to Serco Marine Services

United Kingdom
- Name: SD Salmoor
- In service: 2008
- Out of service: 2013
- Home port: HMNB Clyde
- Identification: IMO number: 8401999; MMSI number: 235003070; Callsign: GAAK
- Status: Retired

General characteristics
- Class & type: Sal-class large lifting ships
- Displacement: 2,200 tonnes
- Length: 77 m
- Beam: 15 m
- Draught: 4 m
- Propulsion: 2 diesels, 1 shaft, 4,000 bhp
- Speed: 15 knots (28 km/h; 17 mph)
- Complement: 19

SD Salmoor (previously RMAS Salmoor (A185)) was a Sal-Class mooring and salvage vessel working at HMNB Clyde, and based at Great Harbour, Greenock. She was originally operated by the Royal Maritime Auxiliary Service, but after the organisations disbandment in March 2008 she was operated by Serco Marine Services.

Salmoor was built by Hall, Russell & Company in 1985. She had a displacement is 2,200 tonnes and dimensions 77 m by 15 m by 4 m. Her complement was 19 and speed 15 knots (28 km/h; 17 mph).

Her duties included the laying and maintenance of underwater targets, navigation marks and moorings.

== See also ==
- Naval Service (United Kingdom)
- List of ships of Serco Marine Services
