= RMAS Fiona =

RMAS Fiona was a Felicity-class water tractor, built in 1973 by Hancocks. She displaced 80 tons, and was powered by a single Voith-Schneider propeller which generated 600 bhp and gave her a maximum speed of 10 knots. In 2007, she was placed on the Ministry of Defence Disposal Sales Agency website for £70,000. Sold to Macrae Marine.
