= SD Northern River =

British naval auxiliary ship, launched 1997

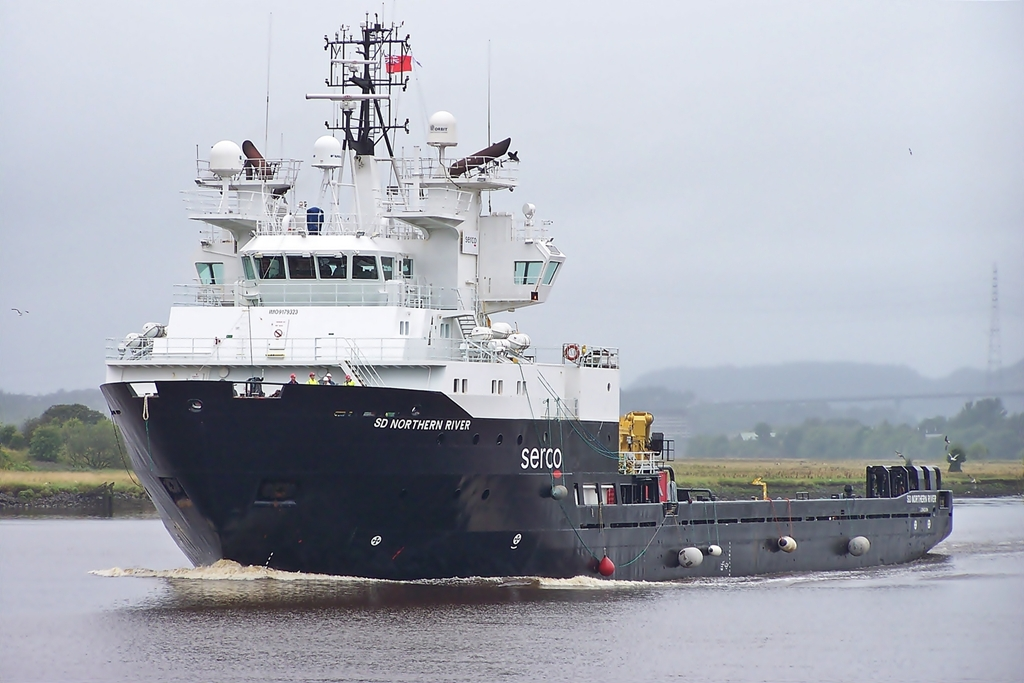
- SD Northern River passing Clydebank en route to Glasgow, 2012

History

United Kingdom
- Name: SD Northern River
- Launched: 18 July 1997
- In service: 2012
- Identification: IMO number: 9179323; MMSI number: 235090402; Callsign: 2FDV4
- Status: Active

General characteristics
- Tonnage: 3,605 GT
- Length: 92.8 m (304 ft 6 in)
- Beam: 18.8 m (61 ft 8 in)
- Draught: 4.9 m (16 ft 1 in)
- Speed: 14 kn (26 km/h; 16 mph)
- Complement: 14 crew, can embark military personnel for training or emergency
- Notes: Large flat work deck; Cranes

SD Northern River is a large multi-purpose auxiliary ship operated by Serco Marine Services in support of the United Kingdom's Naval Service and is currently the largest ship operated by Serco Marine Services, both in terms of dimensions and gross tonnage.

Her duties involve target towing during naval training exercises, transport of naval equipment, noise ranging and data gathering, as well as serving as a submarine escort/rescue vessel. SD Northern River can embark the NATO Submarine Rescue System.

SD Northern River also reportedly specializes in Special Forces (SF) operations, participating, for instance, in Exercise Chameleon 23-1 off the British Sovereign Base Areas in Cyprus in early 2023.

In late 2024, Northern River reportedly replaced RFA Stirling Castle as command ship for mine countermeasures autonomous systems when the latter vessel was laid up for repair and inactive due to a serious manpower shortage in the Royal Fleet Auxiliary. In September 2024, Northern River was photographed carrying RNMB Apollo, a Royal Navy autonomous minehunting vessel equipped with Towed Synthetic Aperture Modular Sonar. In the latter part of 2024, Northern River went into dry dock for 21 days of maintenance and hull certification work.

In May 2025, Northern River was deployed to the Mediterranean to support training exercises by the Royal Navy's carrier strike group. As part of the exercises, she was reported to have launched Banshee Whirlwind target drones while a team from the British defence technology firm Qinetiq injected synthetic threats into the carrier strike group's command and control picture.

== See also ==
- Special Boat Service
- Naval Service (United Kingdom)
- List of ships of Serco Marine Services
