= BUTEC =

Military range in Scotland

British Underwater Test and Evaluation Centre
- Near Kyle of Lochalsh and Applecross, Highlands in Scotland
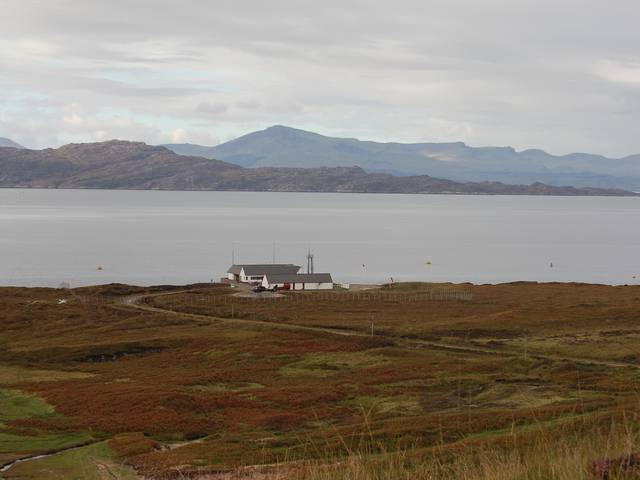
- BUTEC Range Terminal Building on the Applecross peninsula, with the Inner Sound beyond.

Site information
- Type: Military underwater test and evaluation range
- Owner: Ministry of Defence
- Operator: QinetiQ
- Condition: Operational
- Website: Official website

Location
- Location within Highlands BUTEC (the United Kingdom)
- Coordinates: 57°28′21.5″N 5°55′13.6″W

The British Underwater Test and Evaluation Centre (BUTEC) is an underwater military test and evaluation range in the Inner Sound between the island of Raasay and the Applecross peninsula, on the north west coast of Scotland.

BUTEC is operated by defence contractor QinetiQ on behalf of the Ministry of Defence and Royal Navy. The range is used for noise ranging of surface ships and submarines and for testing of a variety of weapons and sensors.

== History ==
BUTEC was established in the Inner Sound by the Ministry of Defence in the 1970s, the location chosen because of its sheltered, deep water, soft sea-bed and low levels of acoustic disturbance. The British Underwater Test and Evaluation Byelaws 1975 came into force on 1 September 1975. The byelaws prohibited public access to certain areas of land at all times and the sea range area when in use by the military for the firing, running and dropping of underwater vehicles and torpedoes and for all ancillary activities. The 1975 byelaws were replaced by revised byelaws in 1984, which were subsequently replaced again in 2016. The range was used for the extensive testing of the Stingray Torpedo in 1982/3 prior to its entry into Service in September 1983. It was also used to test a sample of torpedoes from a batch of 50 production torpedoes, with the batch only being accepted from the contractor (MUSL) if the tests were successful. This continued on a 6 weekly basis for a number of years using a Britten-Norman Trislander as the drop vehicle.

In 2002, there was controversy when a high-powered sonar device was tested on the range. The sonar had been blamed for the deaths of whales and dolphins and had been banned in the USA.

== Facilities ==
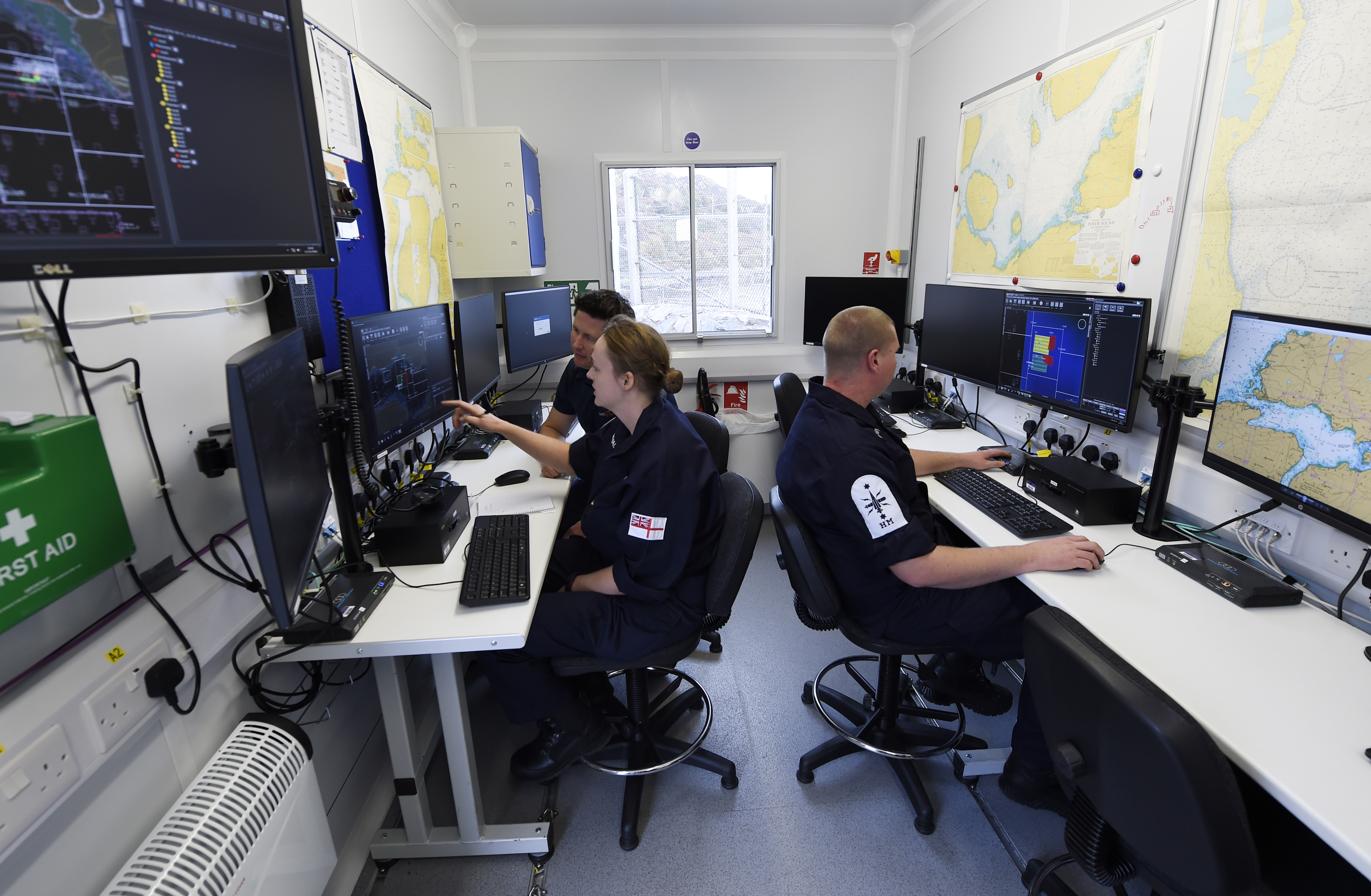
Inside the BUTEC command operations module during 2016

The BUTEC range is 10 km long and 6 km wide, with a water depth of between 175m and 200m.

An Air Danger Area can be activated to cover the entire range if required. Together the area provides a controlled safe environment for a variety of trials and training activities, including airborne, surface and sub-surface assets, weapons and targets.

The range consists of a noise range to the east of the isle of South Rona, and a torpedo testing range located in the centre of the Inner Sound between the isle of Raasay and Applecross on the mainland. The noise range is about a mile long and divided into blocks 50 yards wide (labelled A to Z) within which is a large array of sensors. A submarine is expected to move through the middle of the range (blocks M or N) repeatedly as the shore-based scientific team on Rona analyse the sound of the submarine. If the boat does not achieve its expected aural signature, it is not permitted to start active patrols.

== Operations ==
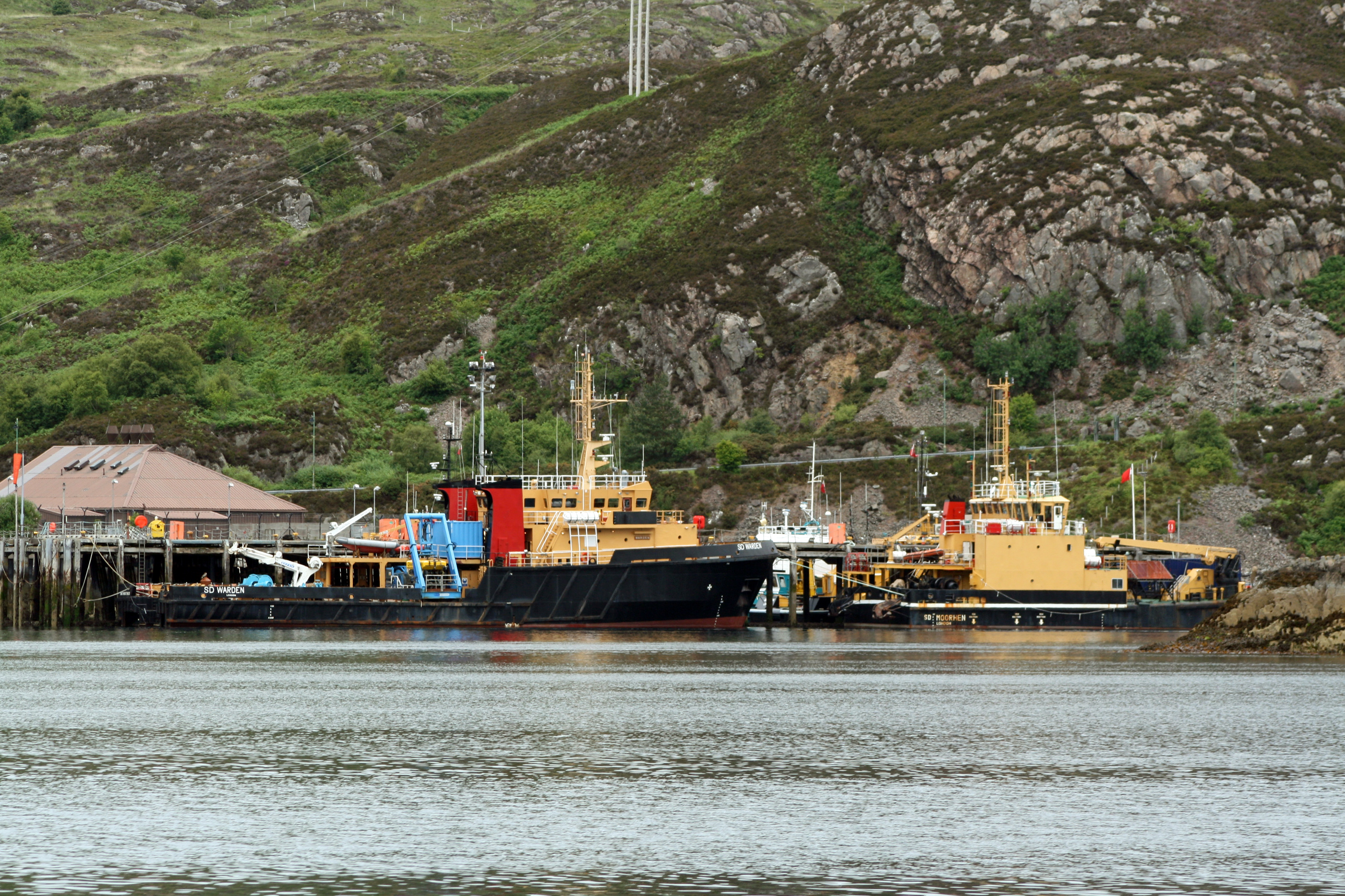
Shore Support Base, Kyle of Lochalsh

The Range Terminal Control Building (including jetty and heliport) are situated at the eastern edge of the range, adjacent to the Sand archaeological site, about 4 miles north of Applecross. Outlying installations for the noise range are located on the island of Rona. The main logistics and administrative centre is the Shore Support Base, at Kyle of Lochalsh.

The torpedo testing range is covered by bylaws which ban any underwater activity by fishermen within the range area and trawling activities are also banned within the whole of the Inner Sound area.

Upcoming range activities are published in the local newspaper West Highland Free Press. When firings are taking place, safety vessels are placed around the range area. Firings are done by submarines, helicopters, aircraft and boats. The torpedoes are equipped with acoustic tracking and measuring equipment in place of warheads. Other trials are carried out here including the use of sonars and exercises by Minehunters.

== See also ==
- Armed forces in Scotland
- Military history of Scotland
