= Royal Maritime Auxiliary Service =

- RMAS Naval Ensign
- Active: 1976—2008
- Disbanded: 31 March 2008
- Country: United Kingdom
- Type: Marine Services
- Size: Over 200 ships in 1985
- Part of: His Majesty's Naval Service, MoD

The Royal Maritime Auxiliary Service (RMAS) was a British Government agency which ran a variety of auxiliary vessels for His Majesty's Naval Service (incl. Royal Navy, Royal Marines and Royal Fleet Auxiliary). The service from 2009 has been run by Serco and is known as Serco Marine Services.

== Background ==
The Royal Maritime Auxiliary Service merged with the former Port Auxiliary Service in 1976 to form a component of His Majesty's Naval Service that was known as marine services. Marine services existed to support the operations of the Royal Navy, Royal Marines and Royal Fleet Auxiliary.

In the 1990s, marine services were put out to commercial tender by the Ministry of Defence Warship Support Agency (now absorbed into the Defence Equipment and Support organisation) and by 1996, all tugs, lifting craft, various tenders and management of HMNB Devonport, Portsmouth and Clyde were operated by Serco Denholm.

By the mid 2000s, it was decided that the Royal Maritime Auxiliary Service would no longer provide marine services to HM Naval Service, and it would instead be delivered under a Private Finance Initiative instead. Serco were quickly declared preferred bidders and the RMAS was disbanded on 31 March 2008.

== Vessels ==
RMAS vessels carried the ship prefix "RMAS" and auxiliary (A) or yard (Y) pennant numbers. They also had a distinctive livery or colour-scheme, namely: black hulls with white beading and buff-coloured upperworks. Below is a list of vessels previously operated by the Royal Maritime Auxiliary Service. A number of the vessels listed below were later transferred over to Serco Marine Services who continue to provide marine services in support of the Royal Navy.

Research vessels

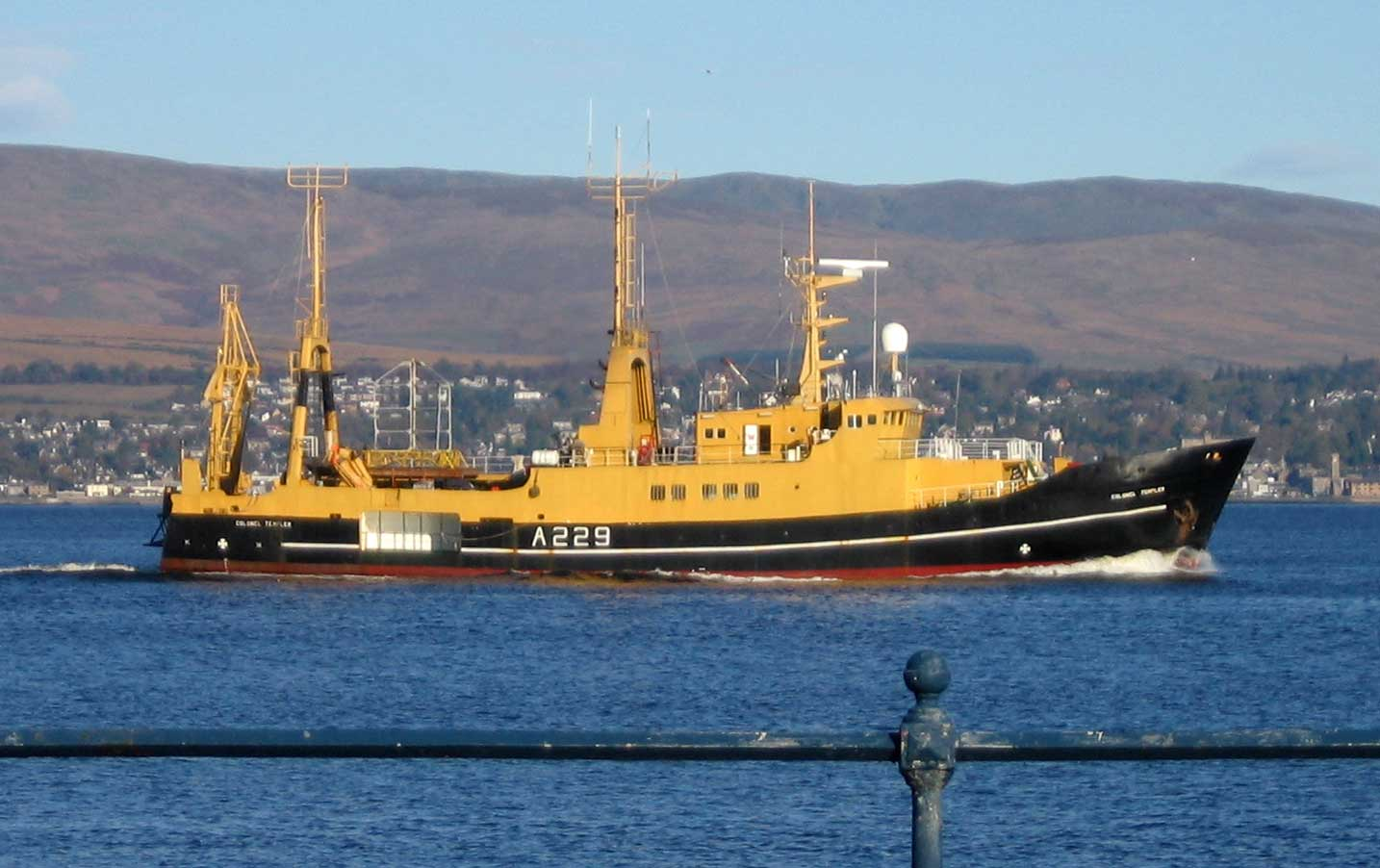
Research vessel Colonel Templer passing Greenock on the Firth of Clyde

- RMAS Newton (A367)
- RMAS Colonel Templer (A229)

Ammunition transport

- RMAS Kinterbury (A378)
- RMAS Throsk (A379)
- RMAS Arrochar

Sal-class salvage vessels

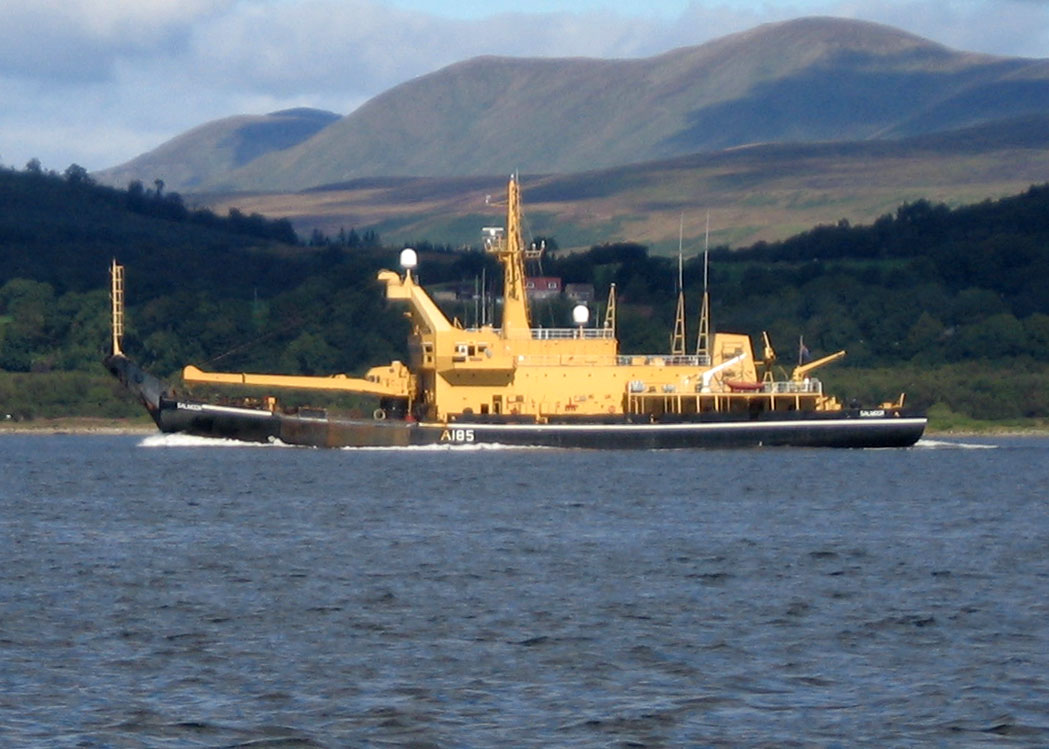
Sal-class Salmoor passing Gourock on the Firth of Clyde

- RMAS Salmoor (A185)
- RMAS Salmaster (A186)
- RMAS Salmaid (A187)

Moor-class salvage vessels

- RMAS Moorhen (Y32)
- RMAS Moorfowl (Y33)
- RMAS Cameron (A72)

Tornado-class torpedo retrievers

- RMAS Tornado (A140)
- RMAS Torch (A141)
- RMAS Tormentor (A142)
- RMAS Toreador (A143)

Torrent-class torpedo retrievers

- RMAS Torrent (A127)

Impulse-class submarine berthing tugs

- RMAS Impulse (A344)
- RMAS Impetus (A335)

Adept-class tractor tugs

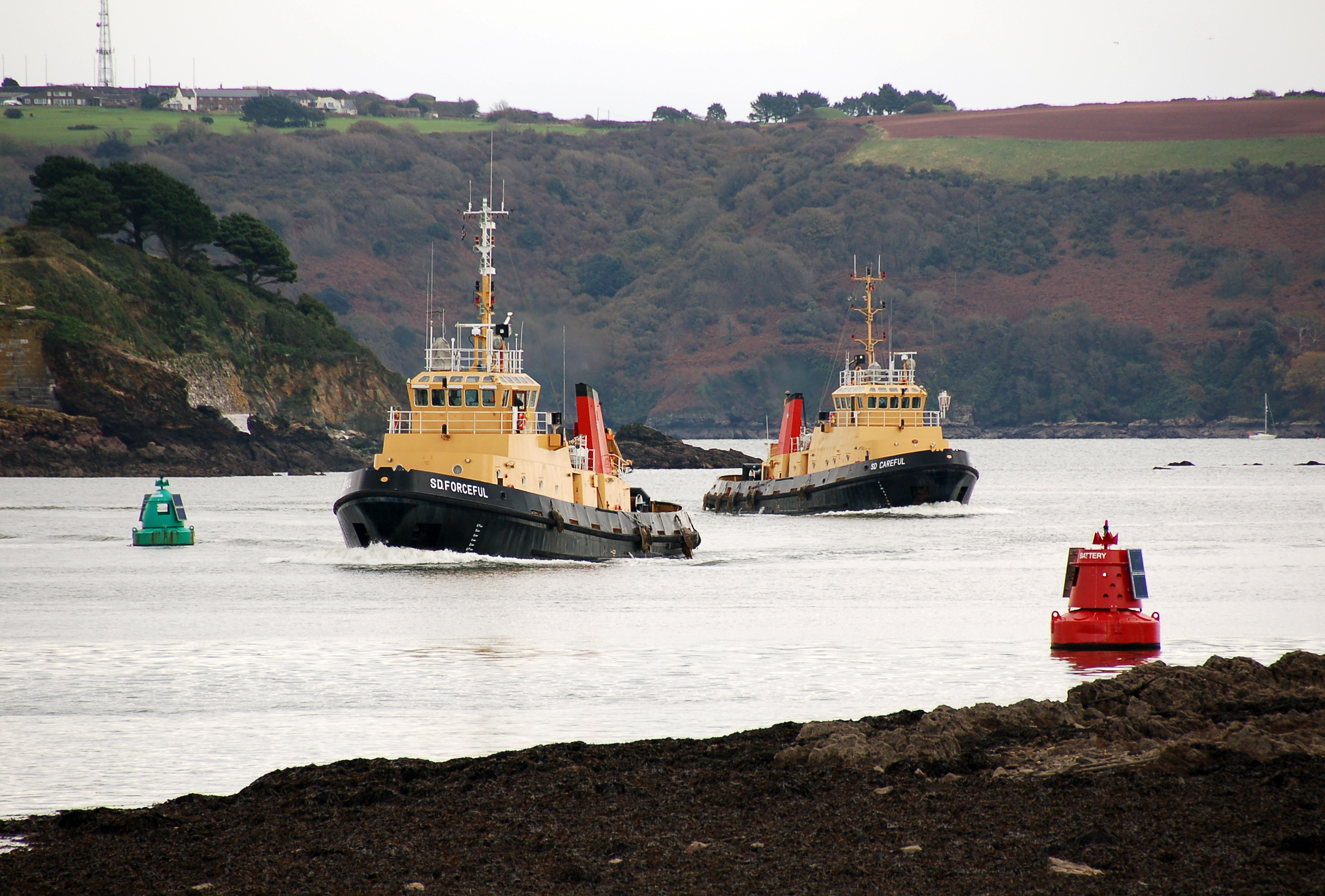
Adept-class tugs Forceful and Careful entering the River Tamar

- RMAS Adept (A224)
- RMAS Bustler (A225)
- RMAS Capable (A226)
- RMAS Careful (A227)
- RMAS Forceful (A221)
- RMAS Nimble (A222)
- RMAS Powerful (A223)
- RMAS Faithful (A228)
- RMAS Dexterous (A231)

Moorings/Range tender

- RMAS Warden (A368)

Fast fleet tender/VIP carrier

- RMAS Adamant (A232)

Aberdovey-class fleet tenders

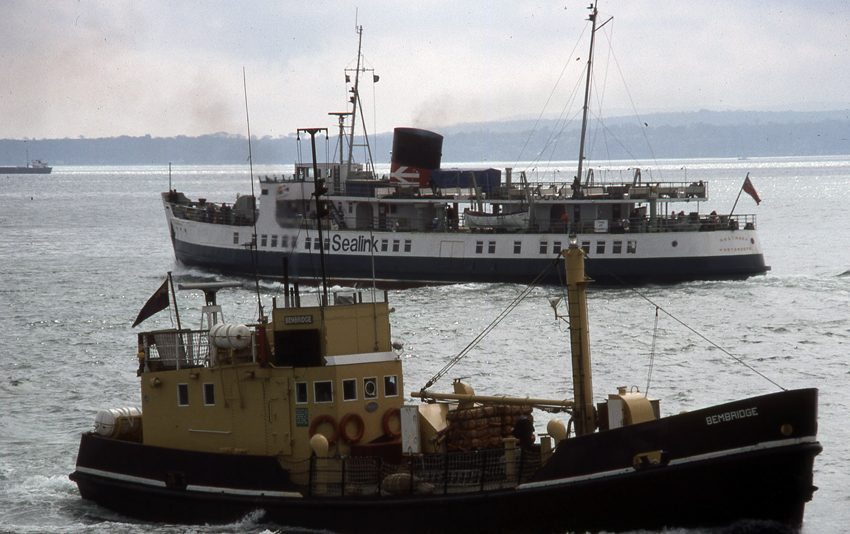
Aberdovey-class Bembridge entering Portsmouth in 1983

- RMAS Aberdovey (Y10)
- RMAS Abinger (Y11)
- RMAS Alness (Y12)
- RMAS Alnmouth (Y13)
- RMAS Appleby (A383)
- RMAS Ashcott (Y16)
- RMAS Beaulieu (A99)
- RMAS Beddgelert (A100)
- RMAS Bembridge (A101)
- RMAS Bibury (A103)
- RMAS Blakeney (A104)
- RMAS Brodick (A105)
- RMAS Cartmel (A350)
- RMAS Cawsand (A351)

Clovelly-class fleet tenders

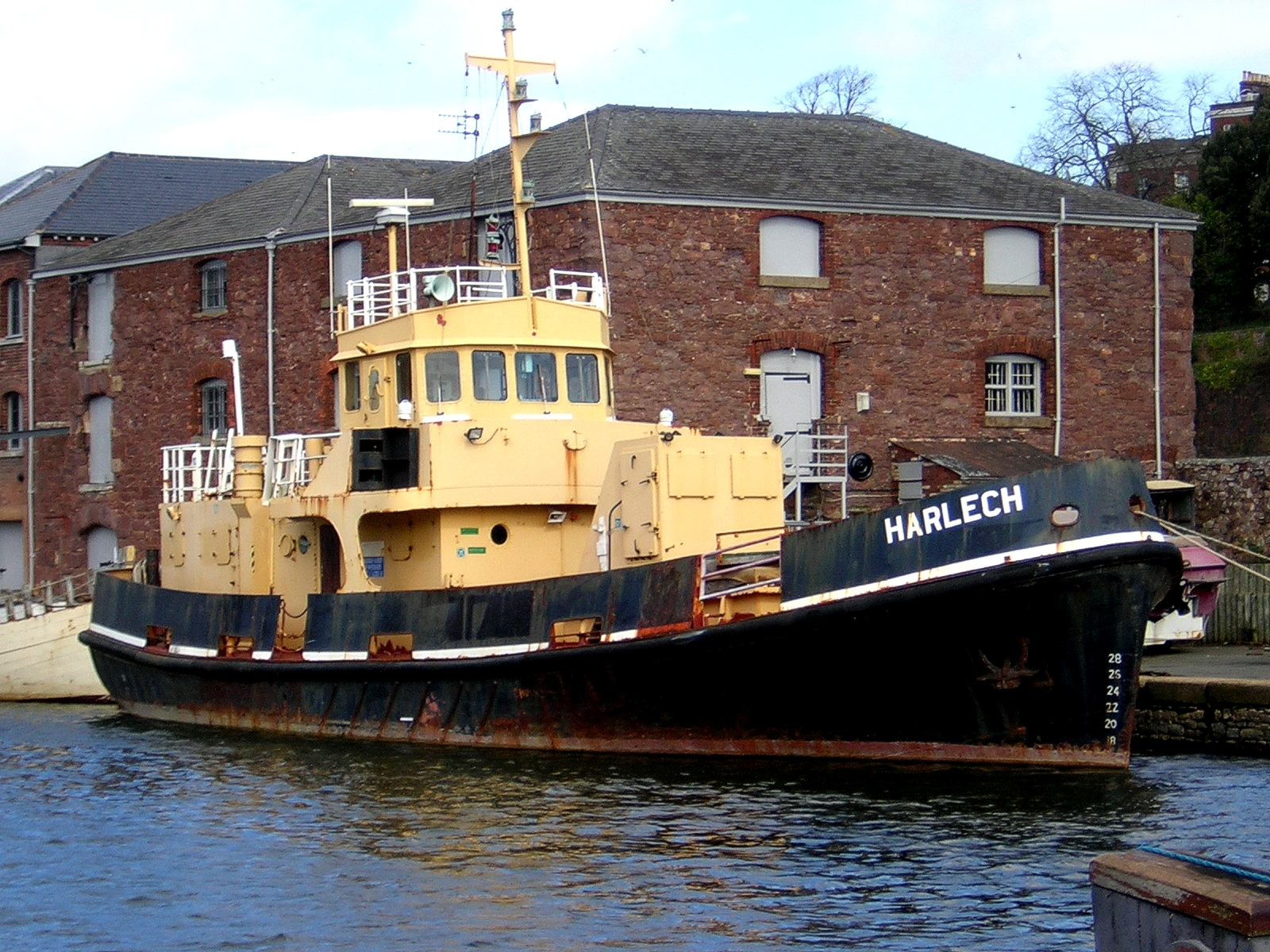
Clovelly-class Harlech at Exeter, England, in 2004

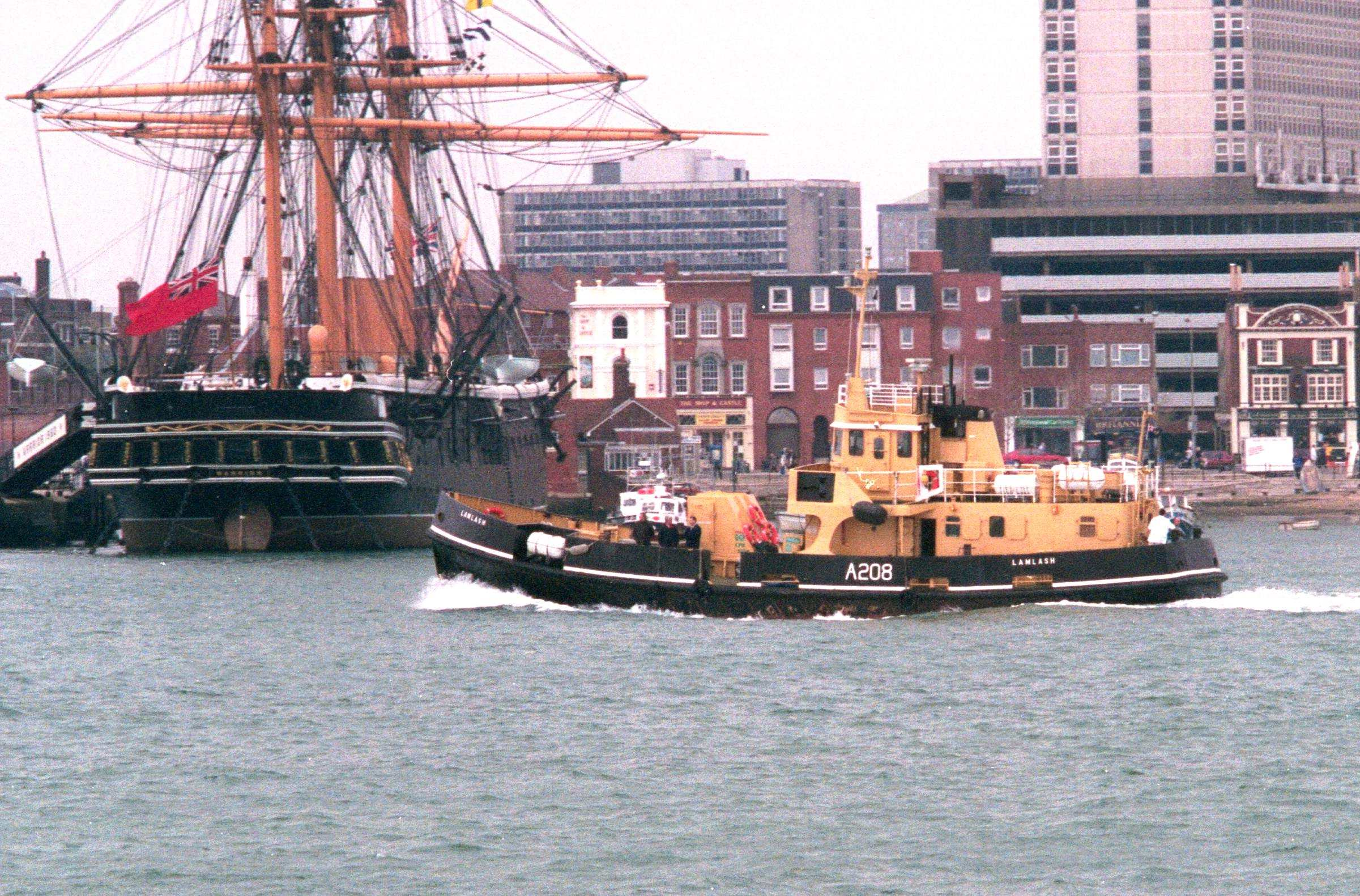
Clovelly-class Lamlash passing HMS Warrior at Portsmouth April 30, 2000

- RMAS Clovelly (A389)
- RMAS Criccieth (A391)
- RMAS Cricklade (A381)
- RMAS Cromarty (A488)
- RMAS Denmead (A363)
- RMAS Dornoch (A490)
- RMAS Dunster (A393)
- RMAS Elkstone (A353)
- RMAS Elsing (A277)
- RMAS Epworth (A355)
- RMAS Ettrick (A274)
- RMAS Felsted (A348)
- RMAS Fintry (A394)
- RMAS Fotherby (A341)
- RMAS Froxfield (A354)
- RMAS Fulbeck (A365)
- RMAS Glencoe (A392)
- RMAS Grasmere (A402)
- RMAS Hambledon (A1769)
- RMAS Harlech (A1768)
- RMAS Headcorn (A1766)
- RMAS Hever (A1767)
- RMAS Holmwood (A1772)
- RMAS Horning (A1773)
- RMAS Lamlash (A208)
- RMAS Lechlade (A211)
- RMAS Llandovery (A207)
- RMAS Lydford (A251/A510)
- RMAS Meon (A87)
- RMAS Milford (A91)
- RMAS Melton (A83)
- RMAS Menai (A84)

Ilchester-class dive tenders

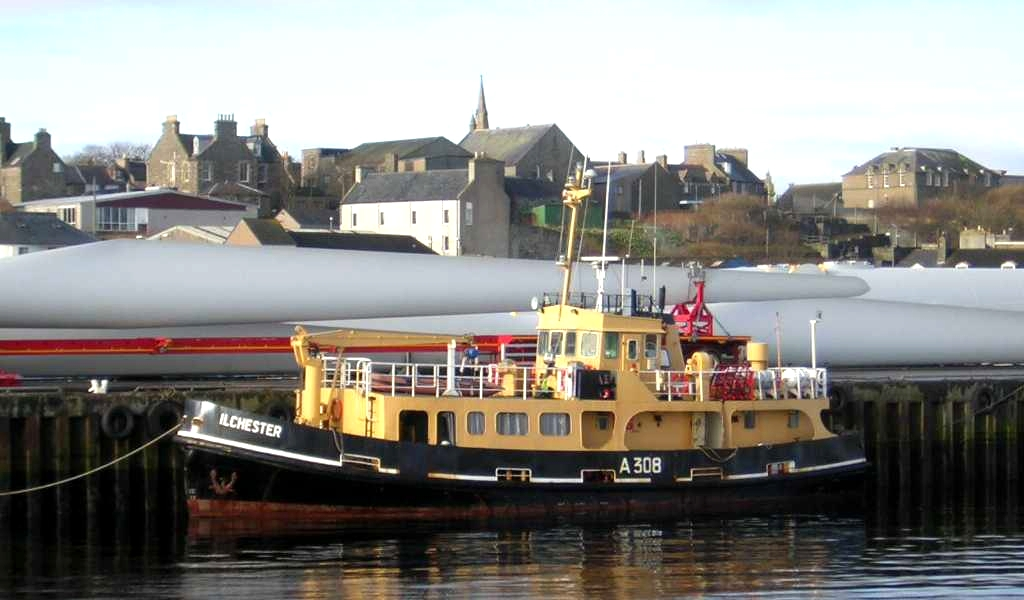
Dive tender Ilchester at Wick, Scotland, in 2004, on her way from Rosyth to Holyhead during the closure of the Caledonian Canal

- RMAS Ilchester (A308)
- RMAS Instow (A309)
- RMAS Invergordon (A311)
- RMAS Ironbridge (A310)
- RMAS Ixworth (A318)

Manly-class fleet tenders

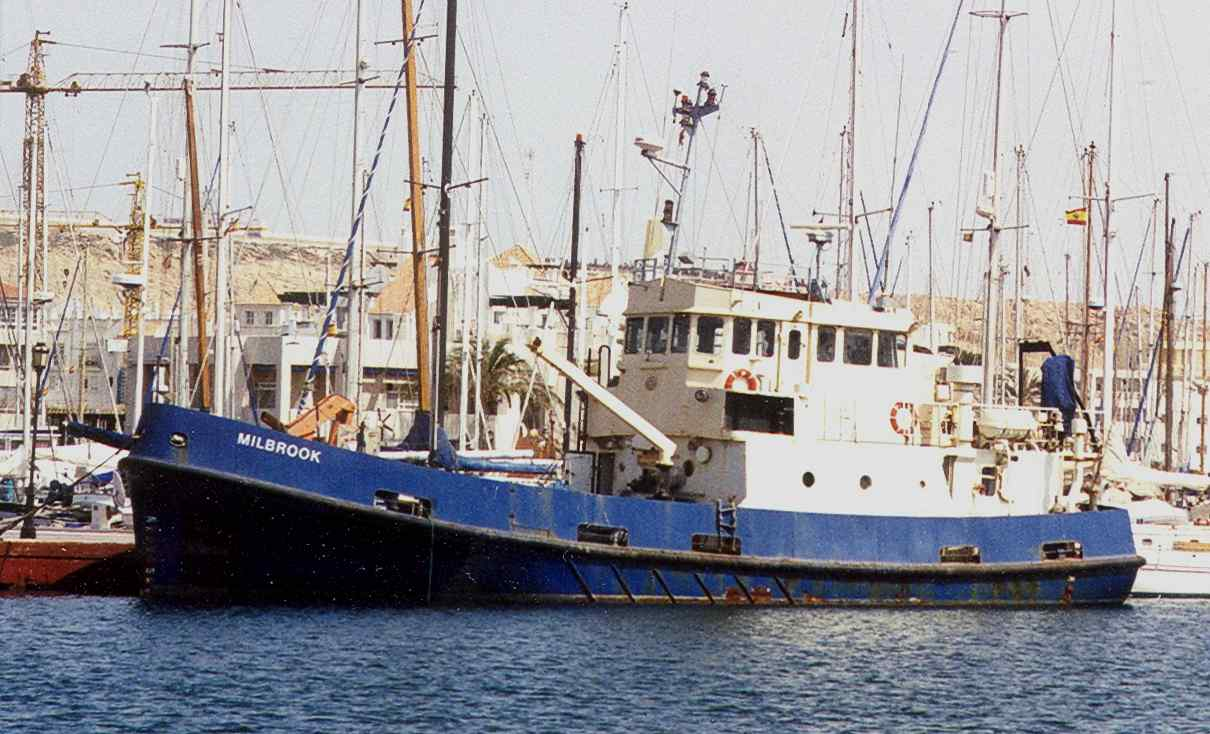
Manly-class fleet tender Milbrook at Almerimar, Spain, in 2000

- RMAS Manly (A92)
- RMAS Mentor (A94)
- RMAS Messina (A107)
- RMAS Milbrook (A97)

Magnet class degaussing vessels

- RMAS Magnet (A114)
- RMAS Lodestone (A115)

== See also ==
- Admiralty Yard Craft Service
- Royal Fleet Auxiliary
- Serco Marine Services
- List of ships of Serco Denholm Marine Services
