= List of ships of Serco Marine Services =

List of ships of Serco Marine Services is a list of active ships operated by Serco Marine Services in support of His Majesty's Naval Service (incl. Royal Navy, Royal Marines and the Royal Fleet Auxiliary). As of 2025, Marine Services operates more than 90 vessels at six locations in the U.K. at: Portsmouth, Devonport, Falmouth, Clyde and two at Inner Raasay Sound.

Vessels of the Marine Service range in length from 11 m to 93 m and displace from 12 to 3,600 gross tonnes. Serco employs some 600 to 650 mariners and engineers.

The ships Kingdom of Fife and Cameron are provided by Briggs Marine who won a £100M subcontract from Serco Marine Services for the support and maintenance of the Royal Navy's navigational marks (or buoys) and moorings in the United Kingdom and overseas.

In 2022, a £200m contract with Serco was signed extending the arrangement for a further 27 months commencing in December 2022. Under the arrangement, the Ministry of Defence has the option to extend that contract for up to six more months. In 2025, a ten-year contract was signed to continue to deliver services to the mid-2030s. Under an additional and parallel contract Serco is to introduce 24 new vessels into service on behalf of the Naval Service replacing its older vessels. In 2025, Serco signed a contract with Damen Shipyards Group for the delivery of these 24 vessels as part of a renewal of its fleet. The vessels will include: Azimuth Stern Drive (ASD) tugs, Reversed Stern Drive (RSD) tugs, pilot boats, barges and crane barges. The vessels are to be delivered in 2027 and 2028.

As of 2021, principal marine services in the Falkland Islands were provided by the contracted Netherlands Marine Services company Van Wijngaarden, while in Gibraltar, marine services were provided by the vessels of Boluda Towage Europe which bought the previous Resolve Marine Group in February 2024. Resolve had previously acquired T.P. Towage in 2015 and these vessels provide all harbour towage and other support services in and around the Port of Gibraltar.

== List of ships ==
All Serco non-military vessels fly the Red Ensign

Ministry of Defence-owned managed vessels fly the Blue Ensign since 2008

Worldwide support ship

- SD Victoria based at Portsmouth (Global support ship; reportedly employed for special forces operations)

Multi-purpose ship

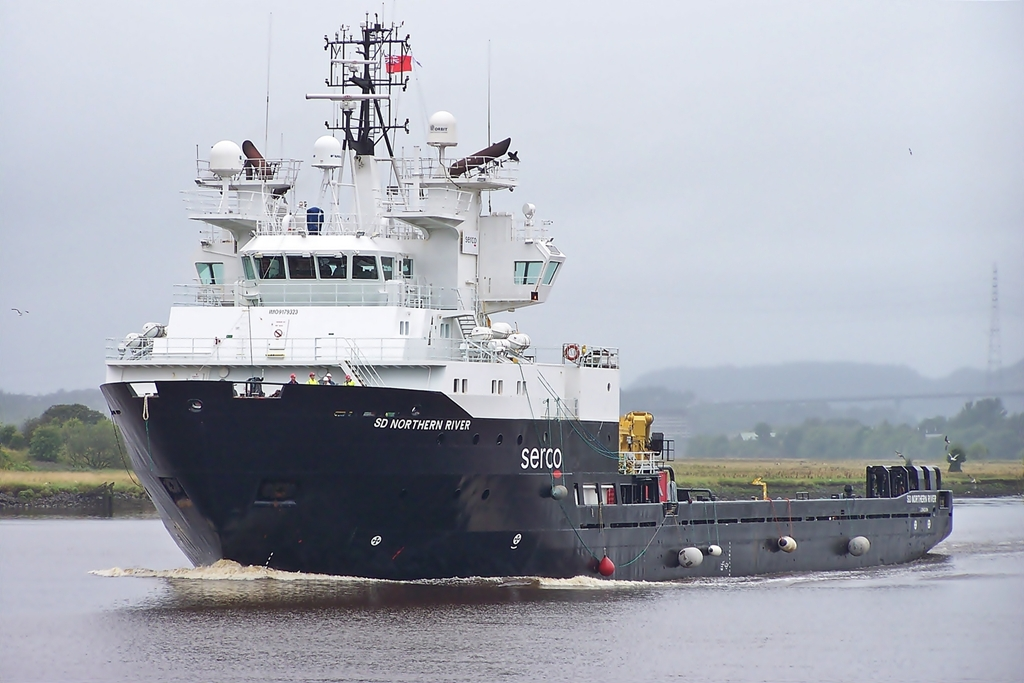
SD Northern River

- SD Northern River (Offshore supply ship; reportedly employed for special forces operations and other duties including data gathering and submarine support)

Moor-class diving support vessels
(Diving support/offshore supply vessels; entered service 1989; based at Kyle of Lochalsh )

- SD Moorfowl
- SD Moorhen

Multicat 2510-class recovery vessels

- SD Navigator (Recovery vessel; entered service 2009; based at Portsmouth )
- SD Raasay (Recovery vessel; entered service 2009; based at Kyle of Lochalsh )

Multicat 2613-class utility boat

- SD Angeline (Utility vessel; entered service 2015; based at Faslane )

Recovery vessels

- SD Inspector (Utility vessel; entered service 2001; based at Portsmouth )
- SD Engineer (Work vessel; entered service 1996; based at Devonport )

Coastal oilers

- SD Teesdale (Oil products tanker; entered service 1976; based at Portsmouth )
- SD Oilman (Oil barge; entered service 2009; based at Faslane
- SD Waterpress (Tank barge; entered service 2010; based at Faslane )
- SD Oceanspray (Tank barge; entered service 2010; based at Portsmouth )

Damen ART 80-32 tug

- SD Tempest (Based at Portsmouth, designated tug for Queen Elizabeth Class Aircraft Carriers)

Impulse-class tugs
(Class of two Azimuth Stern Drive Tugs, entered service in 1993; both based at Faslane)

- SD Impulse
- SD Impetus

ASD 2509-class tugs
(Class of two harbour Tugs with four-man crews; entered service 2009; both based at Portsmouth)

- SD Independent
- SD Indulgent

ATD 2909-class tugs
(Class of four Tugs; entered service 2009-2010; Bountiful based at Portsmouth; others at Faslane)

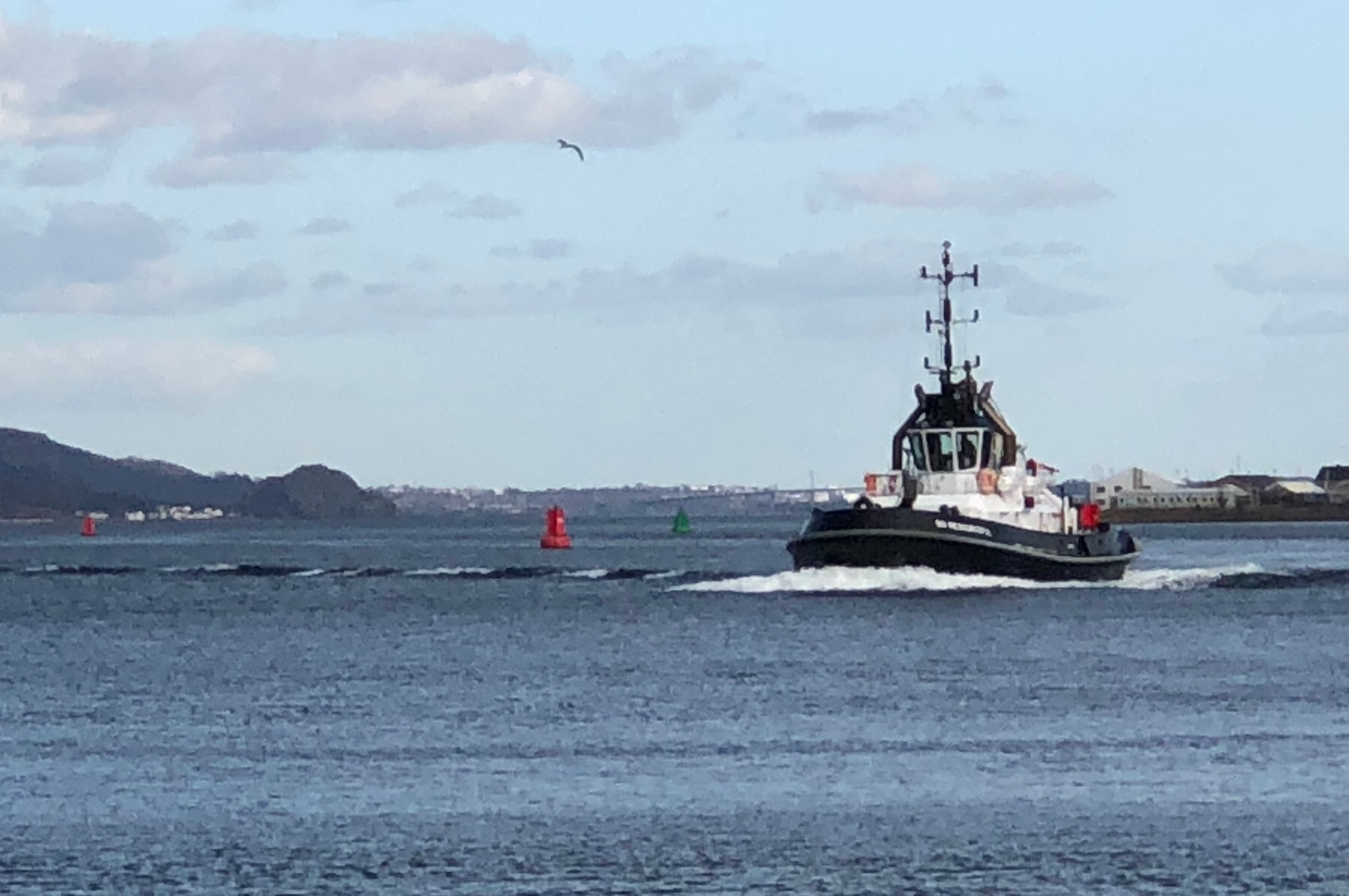
SD Resourceful on the River Clyde

- SD Reliable
- SD Bountiful
- SD Resourceful
- SD Dependable

Twin Unit Tractor Tugs
(Class of five Tugs; entered service 1980-1985; all based at Devonport)

- SD Adept
- SD Careful
- SD Faithful
- SD Forceful
- SD Powerful

STAN 2608-class tugs
(Class of three Tugs; entered service 2009; Jupiter based at Faslane; Hercules and Mars at Devonport )

- SD Hercules
- SD Jupiter
- SD Mars

ASD 2009-class tugs
(Class of Four Tugs; entered service 2010; Deborah and Eileen based at Devonport; Christina and Suzanne at Portsmouth)

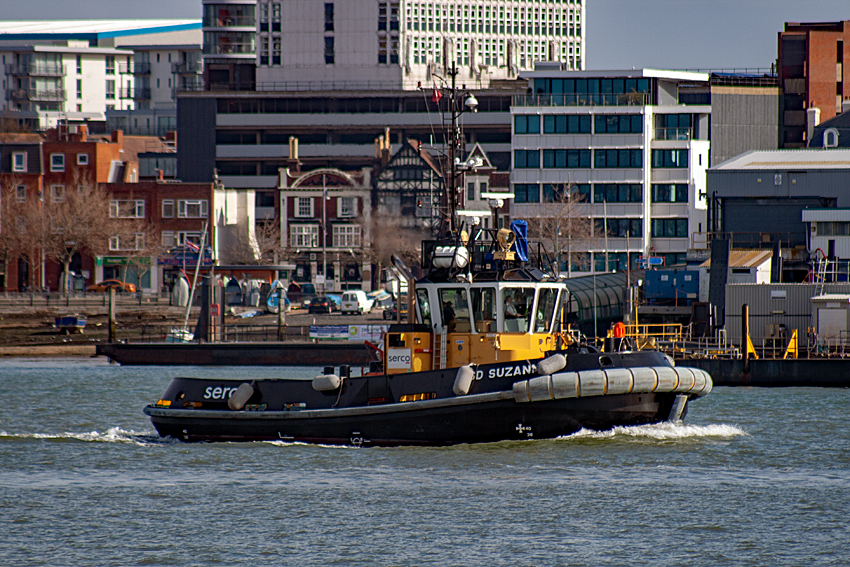
SD Suzanne tug passing Portsmouth Point

- SD Christina
- SD Deborah
- SD Eileen
- SD Suzanne

Felicity-class water tractors

- SD Florence (Tug; based at Devonport)
- SD Genevieve (Tug; Entered service 1980; based at Portsmouth)

Pushy Cat 1204-class tugs

- SD Catherine (Tug; entered service 2009; based at Portsmouth )
- SD Emily (Tug; entered service 2008; based at Devonport )

STAN 1405-class tug

- SD Tilly (Tug; entered service 2008; based at Devonport )

Trials vessels

- SD Warden (Mooring vessel; entered service 1989; experimental and trials support role; based at Kyle of Lochalsh)
- SD Kyle of Lochalsh (Tug; entered service 1997; based at Kyle of Lochalsh)

Storm-class tenders
(Class of two Offshore Supply Ships; entered service 1997; both based at Devonport )

- SD Bovisand
- SD Cawsand

Newhaven-class tenders
(Class of three passenger vessels; entered service 2000-2001; Newhaven based at Devonport; Nutbourne and Netley at Portsmouth )

- SD Newhaven
- SD Nutbourne
- SD Netley

Padstow-class tender

- SD Padstow (Passenger vessel; entered service 2000; based at Devonport )

Oban-class tenders
(Class of three naval auxiliary vessels; entered service 2000; Oban based at Devonport; Oronsay and Omagh at Faslane )

- SD Oban
- SD Oronsay
- SD Omagh

Fleet tenders

- SD Melton Based at Kyle of Lochalsh
- SD Menai Based at Falmouth
- SD Meon Based at Falmouth

STAN 1505-class tenders

- SD Clyde Racer Based at Faslane
- SD Solent Racer Based at Portsmouth
- SD Tamar Racer Based at Devonport

STAN 1905-class tenders

- SD Clyde Spirit Based at Faslane
- SD Solent Spirit Based at Portsmouth
- SD Tamar Spirit Based at Devonport

== See also ==
Lists of ships operated by or in support of His Majesty's Naval Service

- List of active Royal Navy ships
- List of active Royal Fleet Auxiliary ships
- List of active Royal Marines military watercraft

== Bibliography ==
- Bush, Steve (2008). British Warships and Auxiliaries. Maritime Books. ISBN 9781904459361.
- Bush, Steve (2014). British Warships and Auxiliaries. Maritime Books. ISBN 1904459552.
