= Admiralty Yard Craft Service =

The Admiralty Yard Craft Service was the civilian service which operated auxiliary vessels for the British Admiralty, mainly in HM Dockyards or the vicinity. It was renamed the Port Auxiliary Service (PAS) on 1 October 1958 and the Royal Maritime Auxiliary Service in 1976.

The service operated tugs, harbour ferries, launches, and lighters. Although some of its tugs were classified as ocean-going, it did not operate ocean-going supply vessels, which were the responsibility of the Royal Fleet Auxiliary. The Yard Craft Service crews answered to the Captain's Department in each dockyard.

The Fleet Coaling Service and the Admiralty Dredging Service were separate, but closely related, services. Ratings and engineers often transferred freely between vessels of the three services, although masters and mates had to be rated individually on each of the three types of vessel. The Fleet Coaling Service, renamed the Fleet Fuelling Service sometime between 1914 and 1926, operated harbour and coastal vessels carrying coal and fuel oil to Royal Navy vessels. Its masters did not have to be so highly qualified as the masters of the other two services and were paid considerably lower salaries. The Dredging Service was originally part of the Admiralty Works Department, but later transferred to the Civil Engineer-in-Chief's Department (between 1914 and 1926). By 1947, the other two services had fully amalgamated into the Yard Craft Service.

Vessels of the Service flew the Blue Ensign defaced by the yellow Admiralty anchor badge.

== Ranks/Ratings ==
Rated in ascending order of pay scales.

=== 1914 ===
- Boy
- Ordinary Seaman
- Dredger Deckhand
- Harbourman
- Able Seaman/Dredger Fireman/Dredger Stoker/Dredger Ladderman
- Writer/Messenger
- Stoker/Skilled Harbourman
- Coaling Master 2nd Class/Leading Stoker/Dredger Engine Driver
- Chief Stoker/Leading Harbourman
- Mate
- Coaling Master 1st Class
- Engineer 3rd Class
- Master 2nd Class/Dredger Master/Suction Dredger Navigator/Engineer 2nd Class
- Master 1st Class
- Engineer 1st Class
- Suction Dredger Master and Chief Engineer

=== 1926 ===
- Boy
- Stoker 2nd Class
- Ordinary Seaman
- Harbourman/Dredger Deckhand
- Writer Messenger
- Able Seaman
- Dredger Stoker/Dredger Fireman/Dredger Ladderman
- Stoker 1st Class/Skilled Harbourman
- Wireless Telegraph Operator
- Leading Stoker
- Dredger Engine Driver
- Coaling Master 2nd Class
- Leading Harbourman
- Mate
- Chief Stoker
- Tug Mate
- Coaling Master 1st Class
- Engineer 3rd Class
- Master 2nd Class/Dredger Master/Suction Dredger Navigator/Engineer 2nd Class
- Coaling Master C1
- Master 1st Class
- Engineer 1st Class
- Suction Dredger Master and Chief Engineer

In 1925, all Masters (except Coaling Masters), Mates, and Engineers 1st and 2nd Class were authorised to wear uniforms.

=== 1947 ===
In 1947, there was a reorganisation.

- The grades of Harbourmen and Writer Messengers were abolished, with Harbourmen being transferred to corresponding Seaman or Stoker grades.
- Coaling Masters were renamed Coaling Supervisors.
- Engineers 3rd Class were renamed Mechanicians.
- Boatswains were introduced as third-in-command of larger tugs, second-in-command of vessels with no Mates, or in charge of certain smaller vessels.
- All Masters, Mates, Engineers and Coaling Supervisors C1 became salaried and were officially classed as officers.

From 1947, the non-salaried grades were as follows:

- Boy
- Ordinary Seaman/Stoker 2nd Class
- Able Seaman/Stoker 1st Class/Dredger Deckhand/Dredger Fireman
- Dredger Deckhand (Winch Driver)
- Dredger Ladderman
- Leading Stoker/Coaling Supervisor Class 2/Wireless Telegraph Operator
- Leading Seaman
- Dredger Crane Driver/Dredger Grab Driver
- Boatswain/Chief Stoker/Qualified Wireless Telegraph Operator
- Mechanician/Coaling Supervisor Class 1

These grades were still extant in 1962.

=== 1970 ===
By 1970 the grades were:

- Seaman Apprentice
- Ordinary Seaman/Mechanic 2nd Class
- Able Seaman/Mechanic 1st Class
- Able Seaman Special
- Leading Seaman/Leading Stoker/Fuelling Supervisor 2nd Class
- Chief Stoker/Fuelling Supervisor 1st Class
- Boatswain/Mechanician
