= Serco Marine Services =

Auxiliary maritime service in the UK

- Industry: Marine Services
- Predecessor: Royal Maritime Auxiliary Service
- Headquarters: United Kingdom
- Parent: Serco Group
- Website: www.sercomarine.com

Serco Marine Services is a Private Finance Initiative contract, with Serco Group, to deliver auxiliary services to His Majesty's Naval Service (incl. Royal Navy, Royal Marines and Royal Fleet Auxiliary).

Marine Services primarily operates from the nation's three main naval bases, HMNB Portsmouth, HMNB Devonport and HMNB Clyde, but also supports training and operations overseas, as well as at various British Overseas Territories.

Serco Denholm (a joint venture between Serco Group and Denholm Group) won the Marine Services contract, replacing the subsequently disbanded Royal Maritime Auxiliary Service. Denholm's participation was bought out in late 2009 by its larger partner, Serco. In 2025, Serco won a renewal of the contract to continue services for the Naval Service until 2035.

== History ==
Ensign of the now disbanded Royal Maritime Auxiliary Service

In 1976, the former Admiralty Yard Craft Service merged with the Royal Maritime Auxiliary Service to provide Marine Services for the United Kingdom's Naval Service. However, by 1996 Marine Services was put out to commercial tender by the Ministry of Defence Warship Support Agency (now part of the Defence Equipment and Support organisation) which resulted in all tugs, lifting craft and various tenders being operated by Serco Denholm (the joint venture between Serco Group and Denholm Group). The commercial tender awarded to Serco Denholm also included the management of naval bases Devonport, Portsmouth and Clyde. At the time of the International Festival of the Sea in 2005, Serco Denholm were operating over 120 vessels in support of the Naval Service, including tugs, passenger vessels, pilot boats and a range of stores and tank-cleaning lighters. Although Serco Denholm operated and provided all auxiliaries, it did so under the then Royal Maritime Auxiliary Service.

In 2006, the MoD awarded the "Future Provision of Marine Services" contract (a Private Finance Initiative) to the preferred bidders, Serco Denholm. In December 2007, Serco began the flagship £1bn Private Finance Initiative to provide marine services to the Royal Navy for the next 15 years. This contract includes the manning, operation and maintenance of over one hundred vessels and the introduction of around thirty new ones. As a direct result of this, the Royal Maritime Auxiliary Service which had previously provided this role was formally disbanded on 31 March 2008. All vessels formally prefixed RMAS assumed the SD prefix instead.

In 2009, Serco (being the larger partner in the joint venture with Denholm) bought out Denholm's share. Since then, all vessels have seen the SD funnel logos replaced with the Serco logo on the vessels superstructure. However the SD prefix has been retained. The service is now known as Serco Marine Services.

== Role ==
Serco Marine Services supports the Naval Service and the Royal Fleet Auxiliary (RFA) in both port and deep water operations. In port and UK waters, Marine Services is primarily tasked with berthing and towage activities located at the three main naval bases; Devonport, Portsmouth and Clyde. Other tasks such as coastal logistics (including stores, liquids and munitions) and passenger ferrying is also readily undertaken. Out-of-port operations in UK waters include direct involvement in supporting diving and minelaying training exercises, as well as torpedo recovery.

Serco Marine Services may undertake similar activities at British naval facilities overseas, which includes the maintenance of navigational marks (or buoys) and supporting military operations and training.

As part of the 2025 renewal contract, Serco is to acquire 24 new vessels as part of a modernization to fleet and replace older tugs and service craft. A further five-year contract involves the provision of inshore support for military training, including services and diver training (delivered in partnership with Briggs Marine) at the British Underwater Test and Evaluation Centre (BUTEC) in Scotland. Serco is also to deliver offshore support for military exercises, both in the U.K. and globally.

== Ships ==
Red Ensign

As of 2025, Marine Services operates more than 90 vessels at six locations in the U.K. at: Portsmouth, Devonport, Falmouth, Clyde and two at Inner Raasay Sound. The Marine Services were also said to maintain a presence in certain overseas territories, including Gibraltar, the Falkland Islands and the British Sovereign Base Areas in Cyprus. However, marine services at the Port of Gibraltar are provided by the Boluda Towage Europe and as of 2021, marine services in the Falkland Islands were provided by the contracted Netherlands Marine Services company Van Wijngaarden.

Since the disbandment of the Royal Maritime Auxiliary Service, all vessels carry the ship prefix SD, and continue to do so since Denholm's share was bought out by Serco in late 2009. Vessels currently in service can be recognised by their black hulls with white beading and white-coloured upperworks. The former buff-coloured upperworks which had once been associated with the RMAS are steadily disappearing with the last few vessels due to adopt the new colour scheme in coming years. Marine Services enables Royal Navy and Royal Fleet Auxiliary ships, including the United Kingdom's Strategic Nuclear Deterrent, to either move in or out of port for operational deployment and training exercises around the world. The service operates a large assortment of auxiliaries including tugs and pilot boats as well as transporting stores, liquid and munitions and providing passenger transfer services to and from ships for officers and crew.

Government Service Blue Ensign

All Ministry of Defence-nonowned ships of Serco Marine Services fly the Red Ensign. The Government Service Blue Ensign is worn since 2008 by the many ex-RMAS craft under the management of Serco Denholm which are Ministry of Defence-owned vessels.

The largest ship currently in service is SD Northern River. In 2025, Serco signed a contract with Damen Shipyards Group for the delivery of 24 vessels of various types as part of a renewal of its fleet. The vessels will include: Azimuth Stern Drive (ASD) tugs, Reversed Stern Drive (RSD) tugs, pilot boats, barges and crane barges. The vessels are to be delivered in 2027 and 2028.

== See also ==
- His Majesty's Naval Service
- Royal Navy
- Royal Marines
- Royal Fleet Auxiliary
