= Brigade Patrol Troop =

Coordinates: 50°21.975′N 4°9.660′W

- Cap Badge of the Royal Marines
- Active: 1992 - present
- Country: United Kingdom
- Branch: Royal Marines; Naval Service
- Type: Reconnaissance
- Role: Commando Infantry
- Part of: Surveillance and Reconnaissance Squadron
- Garrison/HQ: RM Stonehouse
- Motto: Per Mare Per Terram (By Sea By Land) (Latin)
- March: Quick - A Life on the Ocean Wave; Slow - Preobrajensky

The Brigade Patrol Troop is a reconnaissance troop of the United Kingdom's Royal Marines and is part of the Surveillance and Reconnaissance Squadron (SRS) within 30 Commando Information Exploitation Group.

== History ==
The troop can trace its history back to the Cliff Assault Unit which operated in the Second World War. The troop was formally established in 1992 from the Mountain And Arctic Warfare Cadre for medium range reconnaissance. In 1979, the training Cadre had a secondary operational role authorised to complement its primary training role and took part in operations in the Falklands War. The troop took part in operations in the Gulf War and in the War in Afghanistan.

== Role ==
The Brigade Patrol Troop, which is part of Surveillance and Reconnaissance Squadron, 30 Commando Information Exploitation Group consists of six teams of four marines each who are employed in a reconnaissance role, ahead of the main force collecting information on the enemy and reporting directly back to the Brigade Headquarters.

== See also ==
- UK Commando Force
- Pathfinder Platoon
- Dismounted reconnaissance troop -- U.S. Army equivalent formation.
