= Kenneth R. Force =

American musician, band director, and composer (1940-2023)

- Born: March 24, 1940; Queens, New York
- Died: October 7, 2023 (aged 83); Rye, New York
- Military career
- Allegiance: United States
- Branch: United States Maritime Service (USMS)
- Service years: 1971–2016
- Rank: Captain
- Commands: United States Merchant Marine Academy Regimental Band

Kenneth Richard Force (March 24, 1940 – October 7, 2023) was an American composer and conductor best known for his association with the United States Merchant Marine Academy Regimental Band, where he served as its director from 1971 to 2016. The New York Times described him as "something of a Toscanini of military marching bands" and a "human encyclopedia of military ceremonial and musical data."

== Early life ==
Born in Queens in 1940s New York to Alvina and George Force, Kenneth Richard Force was raised by parents who filled their home with the sounds of jazz, big band, and classical music. His father, a banker, encouraged Kenneth's interest in music, including introduction to the trumpet, and exposure to Radio City Music Hall, Broadway, and the Ringling Bros. and Barnum & Bailey circuses. These experiences were formative in Force's lifelong musical interests.

Later in life, Force told Joan Baum in an interview that a particularly formative experience for him was in the third grade, in "Sophie A.M. Smith's P.S. 115’s classroom .... [when he] saw the only two pictures on the wall—Arturo Toscannini and Marian Anderson.".

Force began studying trumpet in the fourth grade.

== Career ==
=== Army service ===
Force played with circus bands before joining the army. Early in his career, Kenneth Force joined and served in the United States Army, and studied trumpet at the Naval School of Music. He performed in his first of more than 10 inaugural parades in 1957 for the second inauguration of President Dwight D. Eisenhower, at which Marian Anderson would sing the national anthem. Force graduated from the Naval School of Music in 1958.

Force described the experience in 1959 of playing with a British band during this period as being an "epiphany." He would later tell the New York Times, "It was like St. Paul on the Damascus Road, off the ferry marched the Band of Her Majesty’s Royal Marines Plymouth with pith helmets and a sound like an organ. You could actually hear their feet march when they went piano. And I just said, 'This is it, man. I got to do that in this country.'”. Force asked the British band director if there was a manual, to which the director replied, "Manual? It’s 300 years of tradition!"

Force was a cornet soloist with the First U.S. Army Band at Governors Island, New York, and also as bandmaster for the 42nd Infantry (Rainbow) Division Band.

=== Manhattan School of Music ===
Force later attended the Manhattan School of Music, during which time he would perform with the Radio City Music Hall orchestra and on Broadway.

In 2016, Force said that he had played in 14 Broadway shows. Force told the New York Times in 1989 that he would sneak out of class early to perform in a matinee Broadway show before the next class. He told an interviewer the last show he performed with on Broadway was "My Fair Lady" (during the original 1956-1962 Broadway run, originally casting Rex Harrison and Julie Andrews), when he was advised by another musician that although he played well, he should get out of show business to find something more stable.

Force would be offered the position of first chair trumpet with the Radio City Music Hall orchestra.

He performed with fellow trumpet player Merle Evans, who performed at Buffalo Bill Cody's Wild West show, and served as the Ringling Bros. and Barnum & Bailey Circus band's leader. Force also performed for the Flying Wallendas circus act.

Force earned a Bachelor of Music in 1964, as well as a Master of Music degree in 1965. Force's master's thesis would be on British band concepts. Force would also complete a sixth year Professional Diploma in Education Administration and earn a master's degree in Counseling from the New York Institute of Technology.

=== Port Chester High School ===
Following his formal education at the Manhattan School of Music, Force served as high school band director in Port Chester, New York from 1966 to 1971.

Force reformed the band in the British style of Her Majesty's Royal Marines, mixing European and American music.

The band became highly rated and regarded, winning first place recognition at the National Cherry Blossom Festival. While traveling to the festival in Jamestown, Virginia, the band pulled into a motel outside Washington, DC where troops had been deployed following the assassination of Martin Luther King Jr.. Force responded by assembling his high school band students with their instruments in the parking lot to perform for two hours, soothing tensions among students. Kenneth Force later told The New York Times, ''It kind of helped quiet things down a bit. The kids were united through their music, showing the power that music has in uniting people in the midst of adversity.''

The band performed with the Ringling Bros. and Barnum & Bailey Circus in Madison Square Garden in 1968. It had originally been converted from rail station to public arena in 1874 by P. T. Barnum, in what Barnum originally called the "Great Roman Hippodrome" to host circuses and sporting events. The building would later be sold, named Madison Square Garden, and rebuilt in 1925 and 1968.

While he was band director at Port Chester, Force's band at Port Chester High School was selected to perform in the 1970 Rose Bowl Game parade, due to their uncommon British marching style and high performance level. To prepare for the parade, the band received instruction from Drum Major John C. Moon, 1st Battalion of the Scots Guards, preparing for the parade by marching through Port Chester at 6am and providing performances to Port Chester's Mayor and President of the Board of Education.

While at the 1970 parade, an alumnus from the United States Merchant Marine Academy (USMMA) who saw the performance referred Force to the USMMA, where Force was subsequently appointed as the academy's music director.

The Port Chester High School band performed circus music in 1971 in Baraboo, Wisconsin for the commemoration of the founding of the Ringling Bros. Circus.

Some of his former students at Port Chester High School went on to become educators in music and professional musicians in major American orchestras, successes which Force counted as his proudest accomplishment.

Though serving as band director for only five years at Port Chester High School, Force's legacy at the school was enduring. Through the decades he maintained his connection to, and support of, the music program at Port Chester High School. The school in the summer of 2023 named their music room after Kenneth Force in an official ceremony.

=== United States Merchant Marine Academy ===
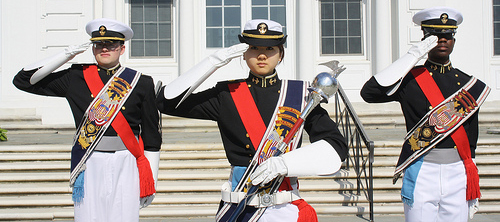
Field officers of the United States Merchant Marine Academy Regimental Band

Force served as band director at the United States Merchant Marine Academy (USMMA) in Kings Point, New York, United States from 1971 to 2016, a period of over 45 years. Consisting entirely of midshipmen, Force led the band to perform in the British style.

Under Force's leadership, the United States Merchant Marine Academy Regimental Band played atop the Brooklyn Bridge for its 100th anniversary, at Miss America pageant parades, on field during a World Series, in the Macy's Thanksgiving Day Parade, and at the U.S. Open after 9/11. The band also played aboard the ocean liner Queen Elizabeth 2 when it carried World War II veterans to Normandy in 1994 for the 50th anniversary of D-Day. In June, 2000, Captain Force's USMMA Regimental Band flew to New Orleans, Louisiana to represent the United States Merchant Marine Academy and the United States Merchant Marine for the opening of the National World War II Museum. In 2014, the Academy's fanfare trumpets performed with the Allentown Band in Pennsylvania, the oldest civilian band in the country, for a Pearl Harbor remembrance concert.

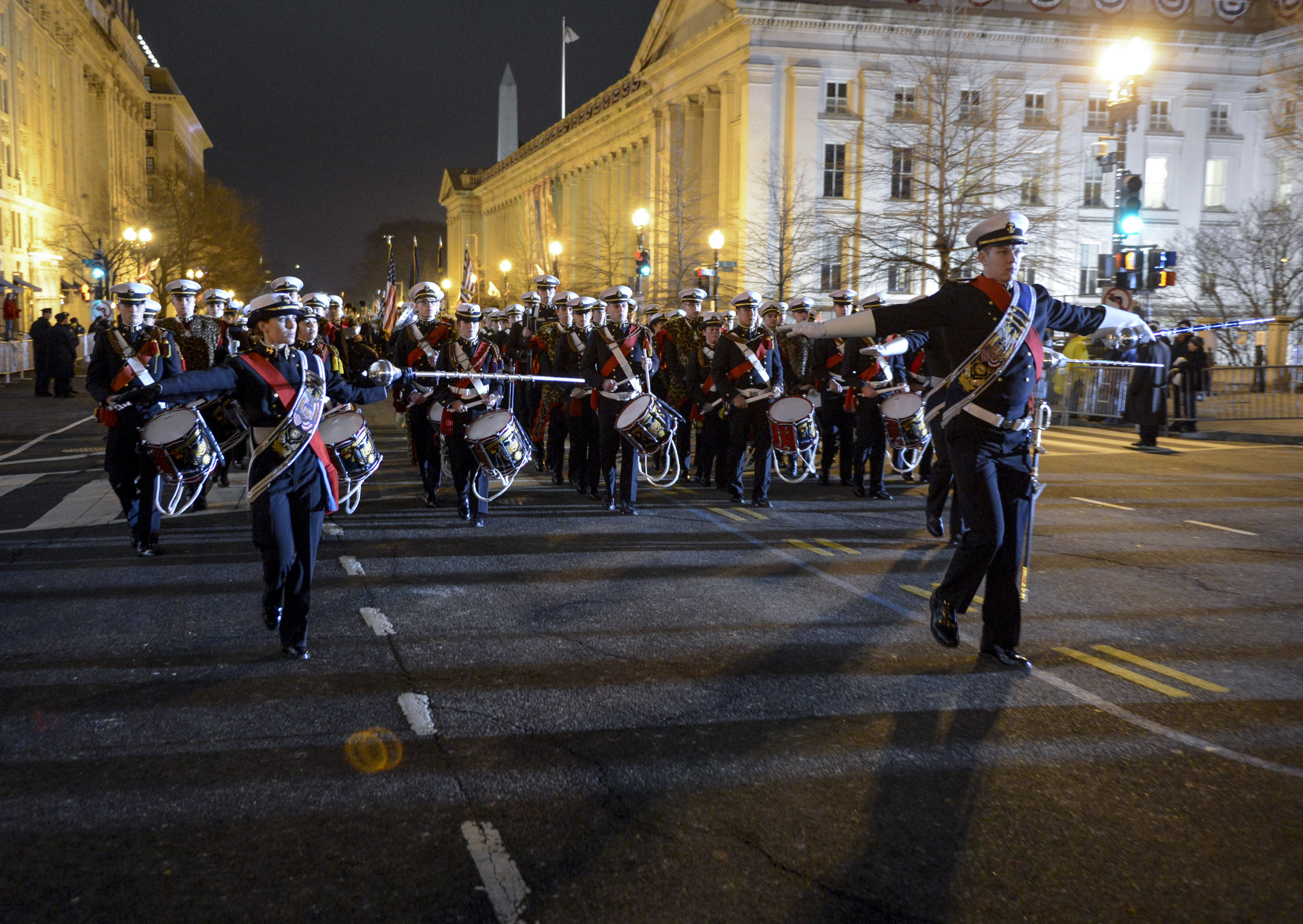
The United States Merchant Marine Academy Regimental Band marching in the British style with drums in the front of the formation

In 1989, Force was interviewed by Fred McMorrow of the New York Times. In describing Captain Force's speech pattern, McMorrow observed, "He talks at up tempo, but you can understand every word.". In the interview, Captain Force described the difference between circus music and the music of British marching bands. He described circus music as having a musical "Merle Evans" "gallop", with a tempo described as "insane." Force related, "There are more than 300 numbers in the circus and fast changes all the time if something goes wrong with an act." By comparison, Force described British band style as "'a moving organ" with "swagger" and drums in the front to signal for change in course, the same as a sailing ship in battle with drums that could be heard above the guns.

In the 1990s, Force's campaign to save the Kings Point, Long Island home of George M. Cohan preserved the property, and won landmark status for the 65,000 square foot estate. Following the effort, in 1999 the United States Merchant Marine Academy Regimental Band was bestowed with the title "George M. Cohan's Own" by Cohan's family.

In 2005, Force successfully campaigned to erect a statue of John Philip Sousa at the Marine Barracks Annex in Washington, DC.

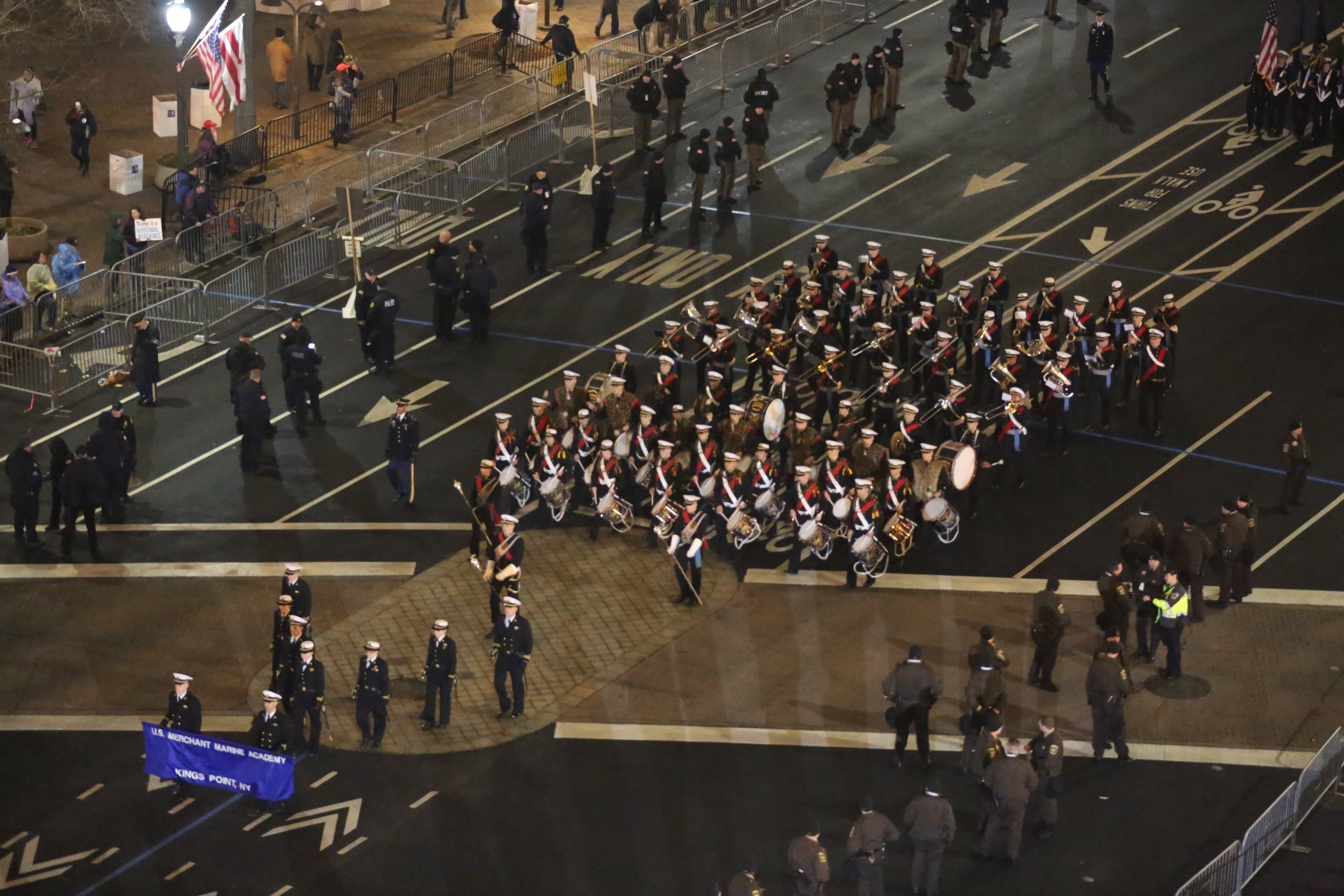
The United States Merchant Marine Academy Regimental Band marching in a presidential inauguration parade

Force led the band to perform in numerous presidential inauguration parades, at which the band would traditionally perform the 19th century march, "A Life on the Ocean Wave.". While serving as band director at the United States Merchant Marine Academy, Force led the Academy regimental band in the inaugural parades of Presidents Richard Nixon (his second inaugural parade), Jimmy Carter, Ronald Reagan (two inaugurations, the second parade canceled due to cold weather), George H.W. Bush, Bill Clinton (two inaugural parades), and George W. Bush (two inaugural parades). For the inaugural parades of Barack Obama, Force's health left him unable to physically march with the band, and he watched from the sidelines. At each inaugural parade, the USMMA regimental band played, "A Life on the Ocean Wave", which became its tradition.

== Other activities ==
Force served as consultant to Columbia Artists Management for seven British military band tours of North America. He co-produced the “British Salute to the U.S. Bicentennial Tattoo” in Newport, Rhode Island, featuring Her Majesty's Royal Marines, the Black Watch, and the Royal Highland Regiment, with a cast of over 5,000.

== Compositions ==
Kenneth Force wrote numerous musical compositions. These included:

- “A Cantata on George Washington’s Inauguration in 1789.”
- ''Dr. Martin Luther King Jr. Cantata,'' which took eleven months to compose, premiered at the United States Merchant Marine Academy in Kings Point, NY in February 1990, commissioned by the State Commission on the Bicentennial Celebration of the United States Constitution, resulting in a seven-movement work for mixed chorus and symphonic band requiring fifty minutes to perform
- "The First Lady March", a march for the First Lady, written for Hillary Clinton
- "Presidential Pets March", a march for presidential pets

== Arrangements ==
- Felicitas - fanfare arrangement
- The Great World War I Medley
- For the 100th anniversary of Grant's Tomb, Force re-scored the music of the inauguration of Ulysses S. Grant so that it could be played by modern instruments.

== Awards and recognition ==
- Kenneth Force was elected to honorary membership in the American Bandmasters Association (2004), an organization founded by John Philip Sousa and Edwin Franko Goldman.
- Force served as president of the board of directors for the Goldman Memorial Band at Damrosch Park.
- Force conducted the Royal Marine Band in Rotterdam
- Force conducted the Royal Military Band in the Hague
- Force conducted the Band of Her Majesty's Welsh Guards
- In 2002, Captain Kenneth Force, USMS was named an honorary alumnus of the United States Merchant Marine Academy.
- Force was recognized with a Lifetime Achievement Award from Long Island's Usdan Center for the Creative and Performing Arts.

== Personal life ==
Force was married to Catherine Sloan, Barbara Hopkins, and Marilyn Uribe in marriages that ended in divorce. At the time of his death, he was survived by a stepson and two grandchildren.

== Death and memorial ==
In Force's final years, his former students from Port Chester High School provided medical and legal oversight, residential assistance, and support. Force died in Rye, New York, on October 7, 2023 at the age of 83. Marianne Lepre, a former student, reported that respiratory failure resulting from chronic obstructive pulmonary disease was the cause of his death at a long-term nursing facility.

The United States Merchant Marine Academy held a memorial service for Force on May 2, 2024.
