= Huntsmen's Guard Regiment =

Huntsmens' Guard Regiment may refer to

- Garderegiment Grenadiers en Jagers or Grenadiers' and Huntsmens' Guard Regiment of the Netherlands Army
- Guard Jaeger Regiment or Huntsmens' Guard Regiment of the Finnish Army
