= 30 Commando Information Exploitation Group =

Battalion sized formation of the Royal Marines

30 Commando (Information Exploitation) Group Royal Marines
- Unit badge
- Active: 2000 - present
- Country: United Kingdom
- Branch: Royal Marines; Naval Service
- Type: Commando
- Role: ISTAR
- Size: Battalion; 465 personnel (2012)
- Part of: UK Commando Force
- Garrison/HQ: Stonehouse Barracks, Plymouth
- Motto: Per Mare Per Terram (By Sea By Land) (Latin)
- March: Quick - A Life on the Ocean Wave; Slow - Preobrajensky

Commanders
- Current commander: Lieutenant Colonel Simon Cox RM

30 Commando Information Exploitation Group RM, or 30 Commando (IX) Group, is a battalion-sized unit of the Royal Marines and forms part of UK Commando Force. The unit resources include communications, information operations, information systems, intelligence, surveillance, and Target Acquisition and Reconnaissance (ISTAR).

== History ==
The group's title harks back to the original 30 Commando (which in turn became 30 Assault Unit RM), formed in 1943. This unit was tasked to move ahead of advancing Allied forces, or to undertake covert infiltrations into enemy territory by land, sea or air, to capture much needed intelligence, in the form of codes, documents, equipment or enemy personnel.

In 2000, the United Kingdom Landing Force Command Support Group (UKLF CSG) was formed from 3 Commando Brigade's Headquarters and Signals Squadron.

In March 2010, the UKLF CSG was renamed the 30 Commando Information Exploitation Group.

In 2013, the group was granted the freedom of Littlehampton, West Sussex, in honour of the original unit being based in the town during the Second World War.

== Structure ==
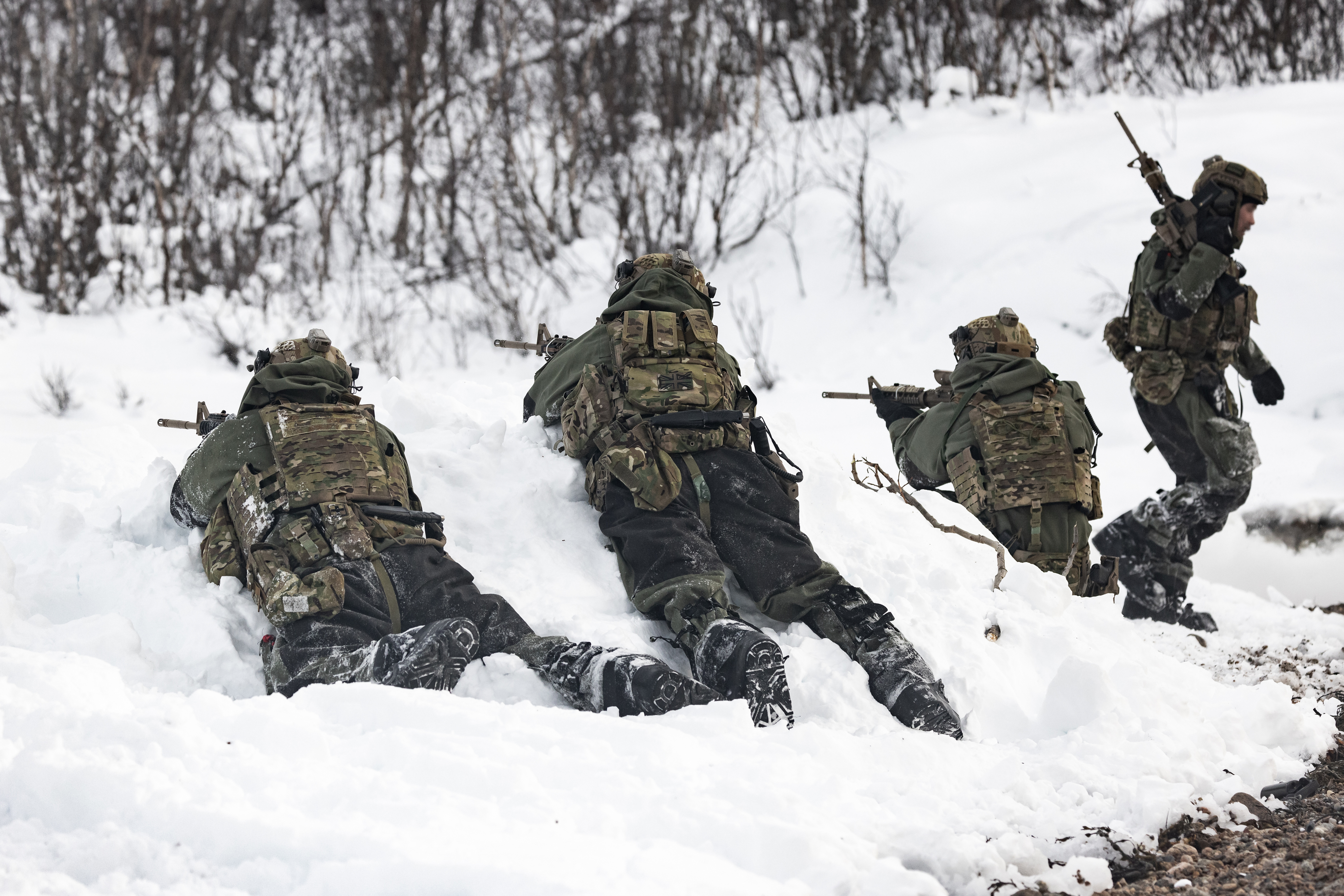
SRS (Surveillance and Reconnaissance Squadron) Shore Reconnaissance Team personnel conducting an exercise.

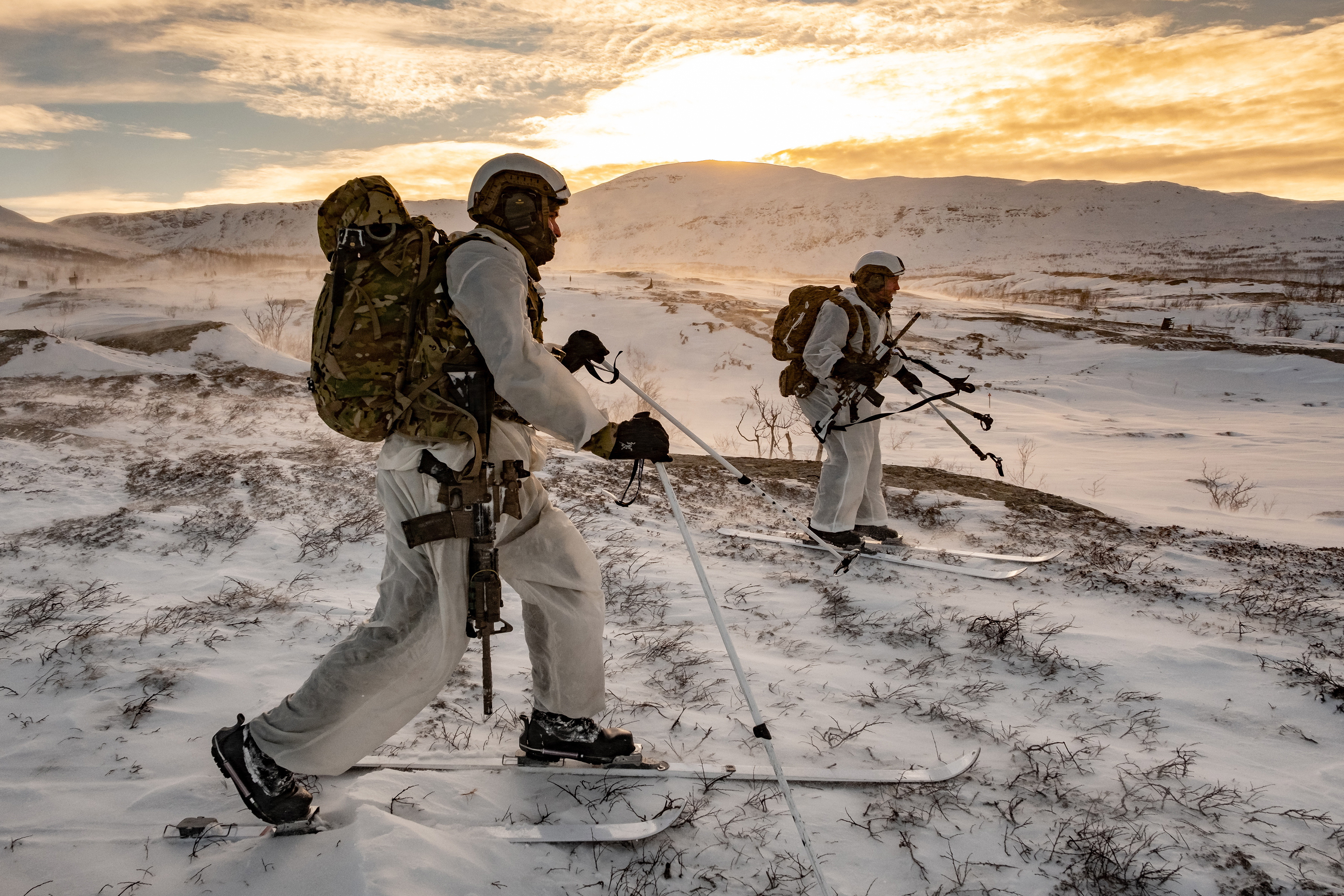
SRS personnel conducting a ski warfare exercise.

30 Commando comprises:

- Headquarters Squadron, including the Intelligence and Information Activities Cells
- Surveillance and Reconnaissance Squadron
  - Brigade Patrol Troop
  - Shore Reconnaissance Team
- Y Squadron - Electronic Warfare
  - Air Defence Troop - using Starstreak high-velocity missile
- Information Activities Cell - Information Operations and Combat Camera Team (CCT)
- Communications Squadron
- Logistics Squadron
  - Motor Transportation Troop
  - Royal Marines Police Troop - protect key personnel such as visiting dignitaries and foreign officials. They also provide training and assistance to police forces around the world.
  - Catering Troop
  - Stores Troop
  - Equipment Support Troop
- Base Squadron - looks after Royal Marines Barracks Stonehouse, much of which was built in the 1700s. It is responsible for providing real-life support, such as dining facilities, accommodation, medical care, rehabilitation of injured personnel and physical training facilities.
