= Surveillance and Reconnaissance Squadron =

- Country: United Kingdom
- Branch: Royal Marines; Naval Service
- Type: Commando
- Role: Reconnaissance
- Part of: 30 Commando Information Exploitation Group
- Garrison/HQ: RM Stonehouse, Plymouth

The Surveillance and Reconnaissance Squadron (SRS) is a squadron-sized sub-unit of 30 Commando (IX) Group that provides specialist reconnaissance to Headquarters, United Kingdom Commando Force.

== History ==
In March 2021, a small team from the Surveillance and Reconnaissance Squadron landed in small inflatable boats to conduct a technical reconnaissance mission on the shores of an Arctic fjord. The SRS' Shore Reconnaissance Team carried out a survey of the area, studying the surroundings to establish a beachhead for amphibious forces to crash ashore and attack enemy positions.

In March 2022, the squadron launched small teams from an Astute-class submarine for ‘subsurface insertion’ missions In Lyngenfjord, east of Tromso inside the Arctic Circle. Their aim was to perform reconnaissance missions on the shoreline while avoiding the multi-national ‘enemy’ force hunting them.

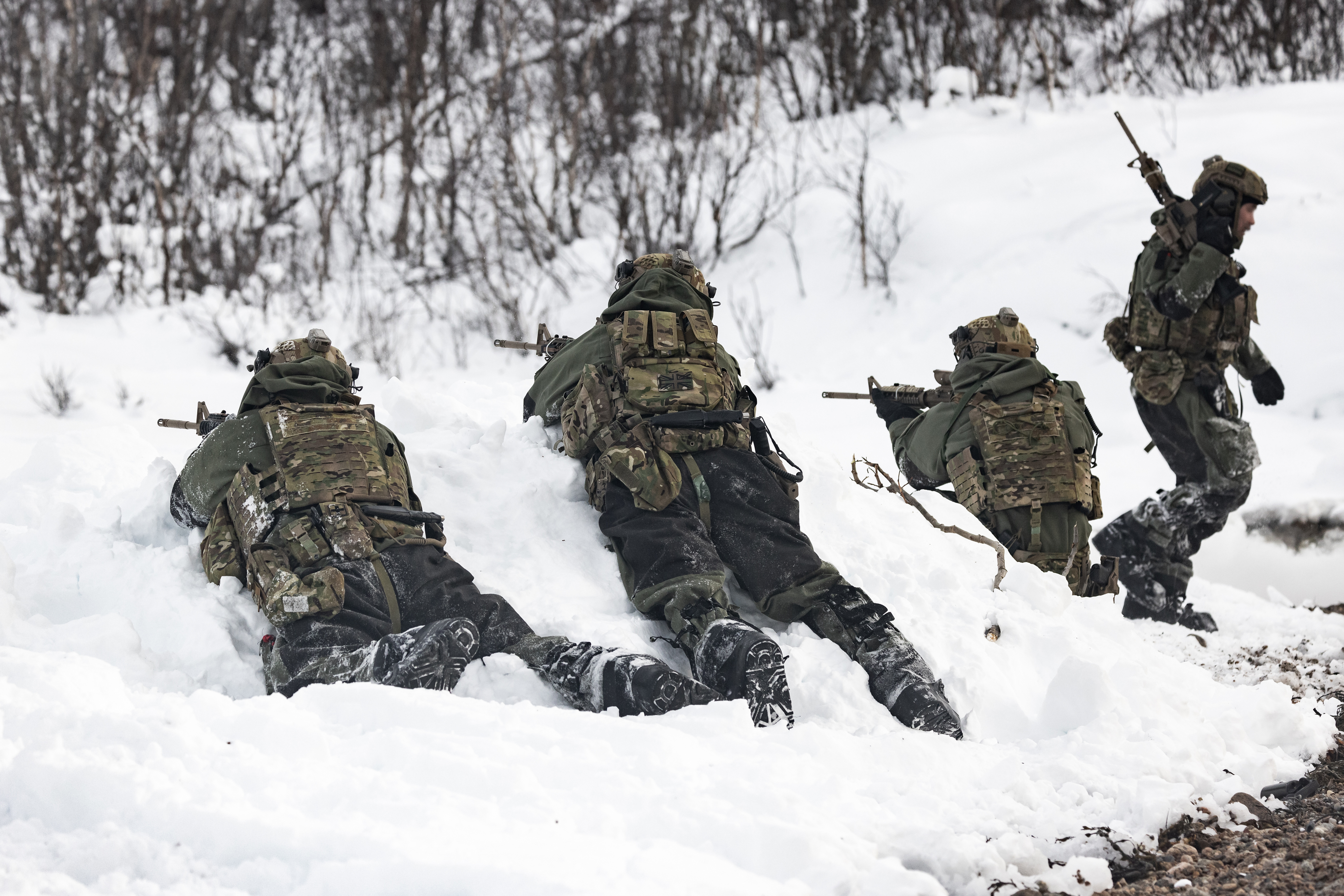
The Shore Reconnaissance Team (SRT), SRS conducting beach surveys and live firing at Ramsund, Norway.

In March 2023, the SRS commandos parachuted onto a frozen lake in Northern Norway from a Dutch C-130 Hercules alongside Dutch Marines to mark the 50th anniversary year of the UK and Netherlands Amphibious Force.

In January 2024, four Royal Marines from the Surveillance and Reconnaissance Squadron assisted Norwegian authorities in finding two missing hikers lost at night inside the Arctic Circle. The Royal Marines’ Operations Room at the Helligskogen military camp acted as the coordination center for the operation.

== Role ==
The SRS is made up of an elite cadre of Mountain Leaders that deploy up to 90 days ahead of the main Commando Force for specialist reconnaissance tasks, discreetly gathering information on the enemy, terrain, and suitable beach landing spots for the larger amphibious force. They are particularly skilled in operating in the High North, and taking unconventional routes including "access up ice waterfalls or more conventionally up cliffs and terrain that generally people can't access." They are trained in "arriving by ski, snowmobile, boat, all-terrain vehicles, helicopter or parachute, depending on the situation and environment".

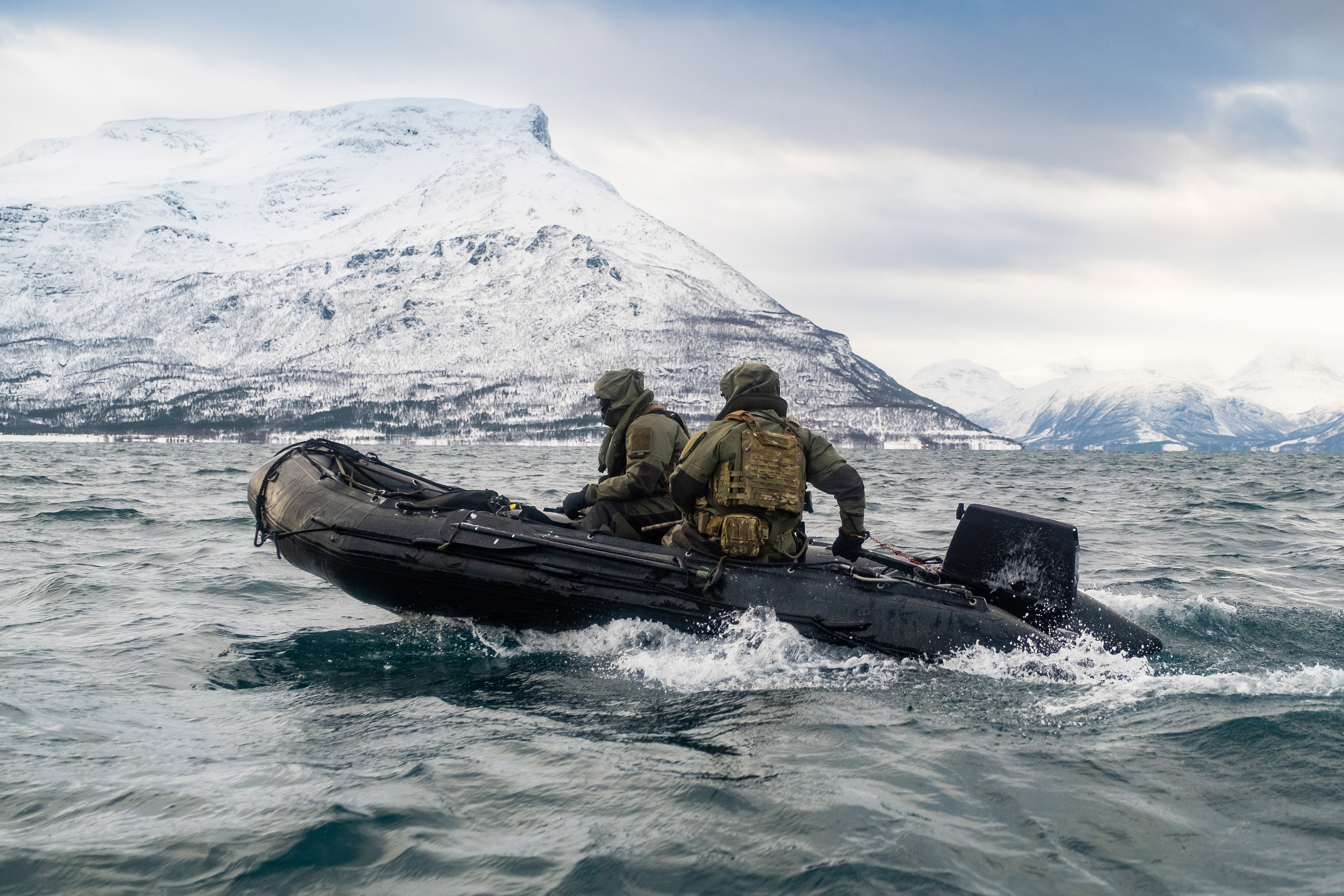
The SRT surveying beaches to identify appropriate landing points for follow-on forces during Winter Deployment 21 in the Arctic.

=== Selection & Training ===
Commandos must first be Landing Craft specialists and, once they have enough experience in role, they undertake a five-week Reconnaissance Operators course to develop covert surveillance and reconnaissance skills, and experience of operating behind enemy lines to gather intelligence.

Mountain Leaders from the squadron must have completed the Mountain Leader Class 3 (ML3) course; consisting of an initial Mountain Leader Selection course, it is followed by the 8 week ML3 course that includes cliff climbing in Cornwall, mountain climbing in North Wales and 2 weeks mountain training in Glen Coe, Scotland, as well as 2 exercises practising reconnaissance and guiding attack troops to their objectives. They are also taught how to parachute, specialist communication skills, and survival, evasion, resistance, extraction (SERE).

== See also ==
- Pathfinder Platoon
- Mountain Leader Training Cadre
