= Cadre (military) =

Core of a military unit responsible for training the rest of the unit

A cadre (/ˈkɑːdrə/, also UK: /ˈkɑːdər/, also US: /ˈkɑːdreɪ/) is the complement of commissioned officers and non-commissioned officers of a military unit responsible for training the rest of the unit. The cadre may be the permanent skeleton establishment of a unit, around which the full unit can be built if needed. In countries which have conscription, a cadre may comprise the permanent staff of a regiment who train the conscripts assigned to it. The term comes from the French expression en cadre, with the same meaning.

== United States Armed Forces ==
In the United States Armed Forces, a cadre is a group or member of a group of leaders, especially in units that conduct formal training schools. In United States Army jargon, the word is singular and plural. At the United States Military Academy, the upper-class cadets who conduct Cadet Basic Training for incoming freshmen are called the cadre.

== British Armed Forces ==
In the British Armed Forces, a cadre is a group of instructors or a unit that trains potential instructors or non-commissioned officers (NCOs), in which case it usually also includes the trainees (e.g., the Mountain Leader Training Cadre of the Royal Marines).

== Japan Self-Defense Forces ==
In the Japan Self-Defense Forces, the direct translation in Japanese for this word is "幹部, (kanbu)", which refers to the commissioned officers (幹部自衛官, kanbu-jieikan). The JMSDF unofficially uses the word "准幹部, jun-kanbu" which means, "associate cadre" if the word is directly translated for the warrant officers, since their position as the warrant officer is different from the other two (Ground and Air) branches.

== Canada ==
Adapted from the military usage, in Canadian police services, a cadre is an individual officer. It is used in place of badge number and is used in Records Management Systems for dispatching and report entry.

== See also ==
- Military organisation
