= United States Merchant Marine Academy Regimental Band =

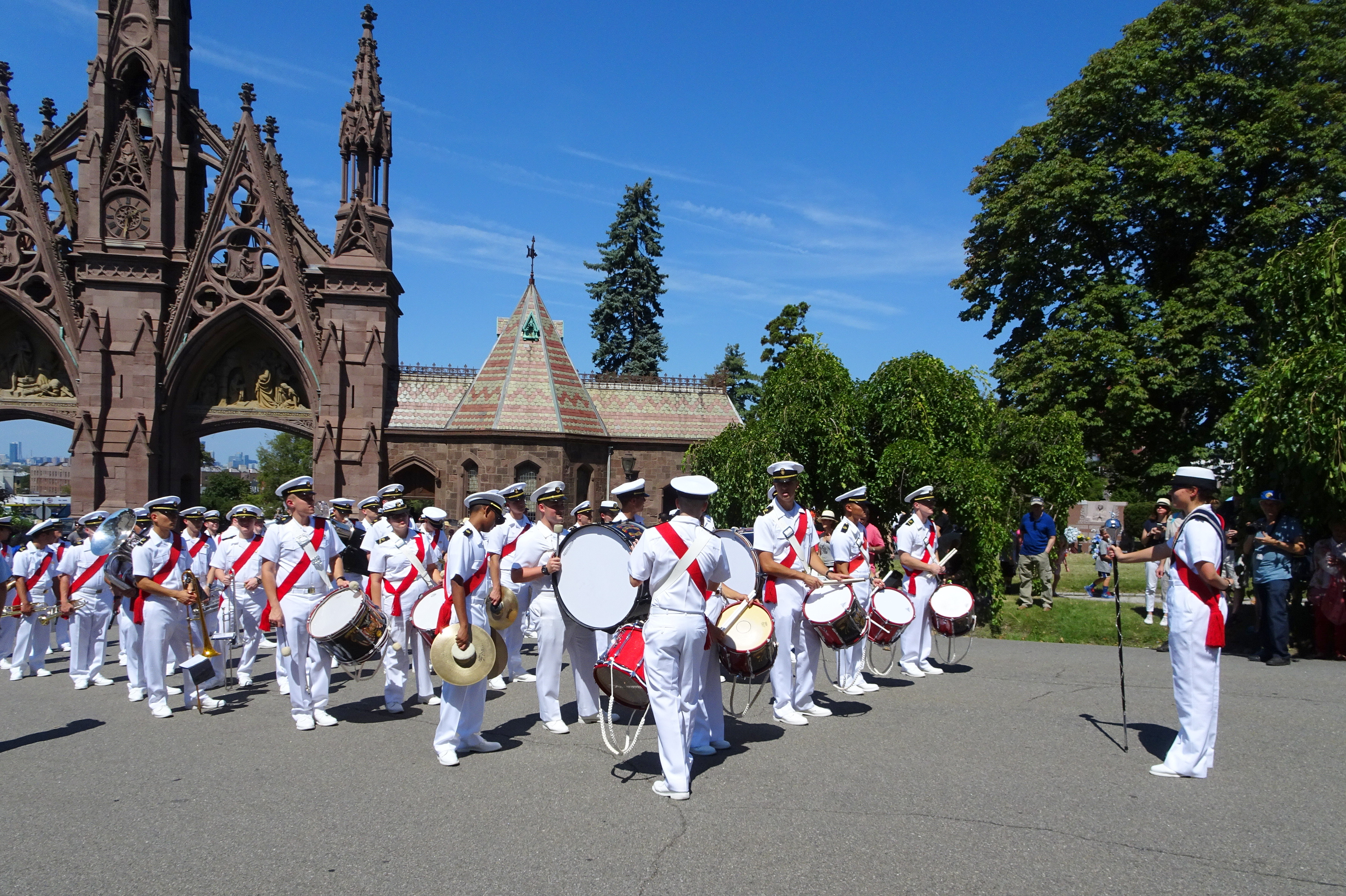
The band during a 2016 performance in New York.

The United States Merchant Marine Academy Regimental Band, designated as "George M. Cohan's Own", is a United States military band and college marching band that currently serves as the official marching band of the United States Merchant Marine Academy. The USMMA is the only service academy outside of the six senior military colleges, to maintain a cadet-staffed band for musical purposes. The band, unlike other musical units of service academies, is a co-located full-time ensemble. The band mainly provides ceremonial support for protocol ceremonies and athletic events.

The band performing "A Life on the Ocean Wave"

The regimental band routinely performs A Life on the Ocean Wave, the official march of the USMMA and the Star Spangled Banner at all ceremonies. The Academy's modern regimental band succeeded a full-time band that was deactivated following World War II.

As of 2018, the Academy's official website listed the band's director as Lieutenant Commander Bob Nixon. Captain Kenneth Force, who the New York Times described as the "Toscanini of Military Marching Bands," directed the band from 1971 – 2016.

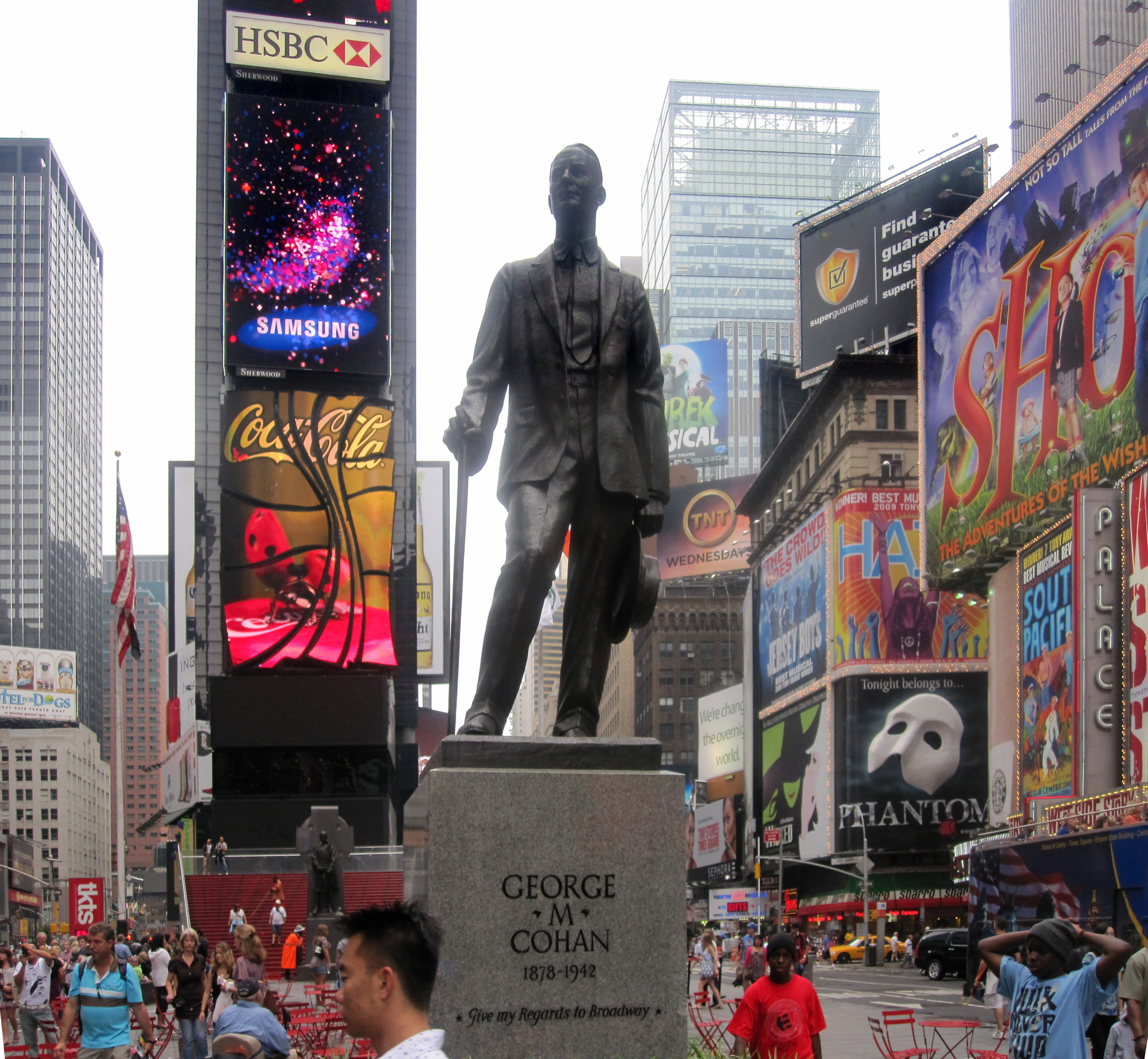
George M. Cohan statue in Times Square

The band was given the designation "George M. Cohan's Own" in 1999 by two of composer George M. Cohan's grandchildren, in recognition of the band's assistance in saving Cohan's seven acre former residence from demolition. In 1999, Midshipman Lester Snyder, a trumpet player from Decatur, Illinois commented on the accomplishment: ''It's a great part of history. Now, I can take my kids here someday when I come back for homecoming. I'll be able to share this with the next generation, and maybe they will get to know something about the feeling of duty and honor to your country.''

The 35-piece band performs in the following ensembles:

- Marching Band
- Concert Band
- Brass Quintet
- Fanfare Team

== Performances ==
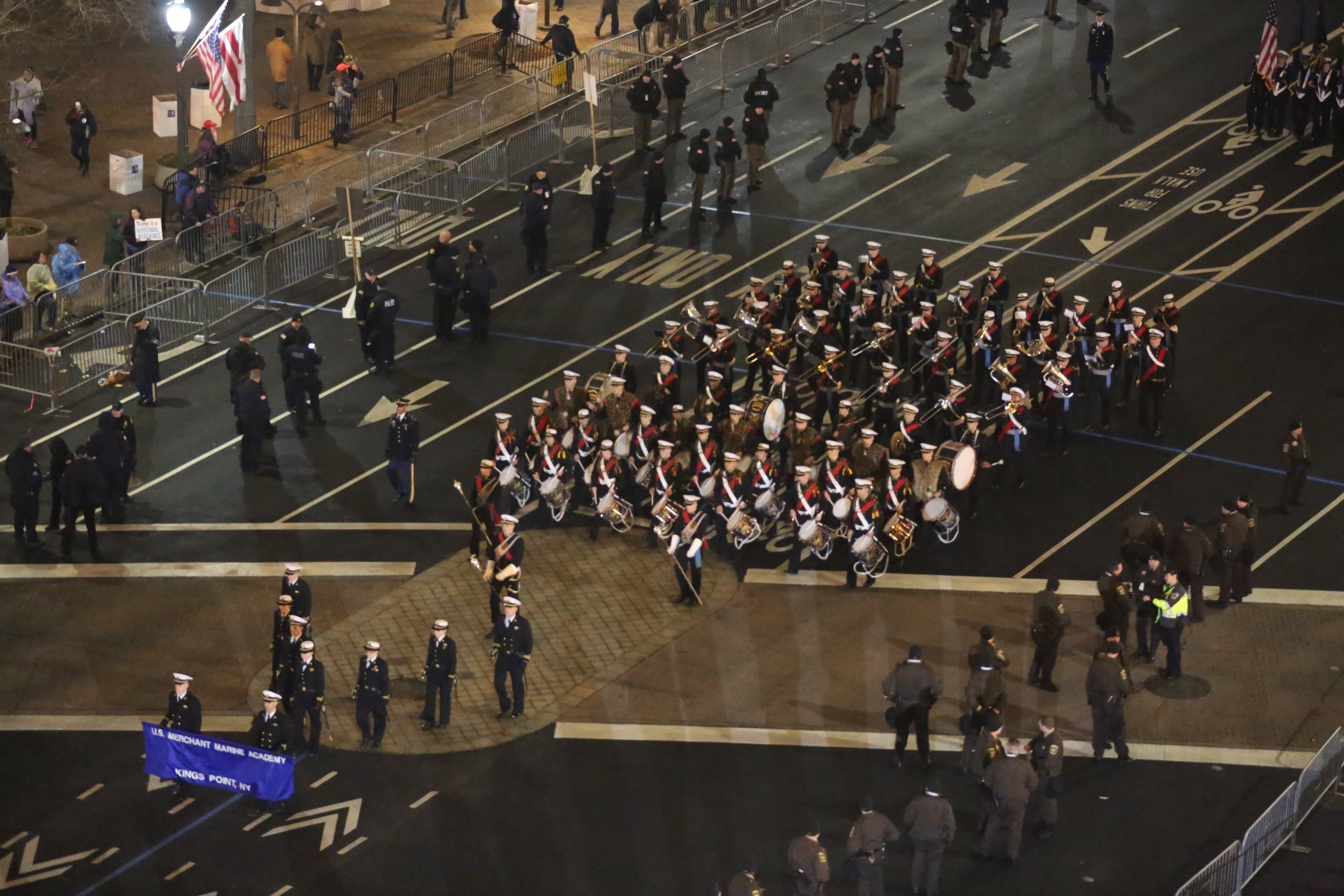
The United States Merchant Marine Academy Regimental Band marching in review for the 2017 United States presidential inauguration parade

The band for decades represented the academy at presidential inaugural parades. The band plays an essential in the "Ceremony of Beating Retreat", which is a military tattoo based in British roots. It takes place during the USMMA parent weekend, and usually has parents of midshipmen in attendance. The band traditionally performs at the end of the National Memorial Day Parade in May. The band has also historically taken part in civil parades/events, including the Macy's Thanksgiving Day Parade, the Cotton Bowl Classic Halftime Show, the Miss America Pageant, and events on Cow Harbor Day.

== Characteristics ==
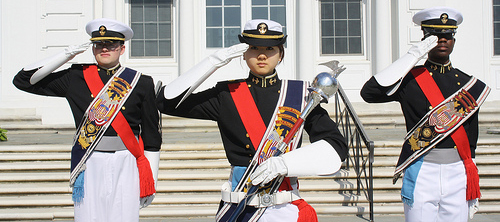
Field officers of United States Merchant Marine Academy Regimental Band

Like its counterparts at the Valley Forge Military Academy and College in Wayne, Pennsylvania, it uses the same military format as the British Royal Marines Band Service. An example of this similarity is seen the most in the use of tenor drums and its location to the front of the formation. The uniform consists of a combination peaked cap with a gold chinstrap, a black tunic, and white trousers, alongside white gloves and black shoes.
