= Pathfinder Platoon =

Pathfinders
- Logo of the Pathfinder Platoon
- Active: March 1985–present
- Country: United Kingdom
- Branch: British Army
- Type: Pathfinder
- Role: Pathfinder operations Special Reconnaissance
- Part of: 16 Air Assault Brigade Combat Team
- Garrison/HQ: Colchester Garrison
- Nicknames: "The PF", "The Finders", "X Platoon", "Ghost Platoon"
- Motto: First In
- Engagements: List: Operation Agricola; Operation Tosca; Operation Palliser; Operation Essential Harvest; Operation Veritas; Operation Telic; Operation Herrick; Operation Pitting

Insignia
- Drop Zone Flash

The Pathfinder Platoon is a pathfinder unit of the British Army, and an integral part of 16 Air Assault Brigade Combat Team. The Pathfinder Platoon acts as the brigade's advance force and reconnaissance force. Its role includes locating and marking drop zones and helicopter landing zones for air landing operations. Once the main force has landed, the platoon provides tactical intelligence and offensive action roles for the brigade.

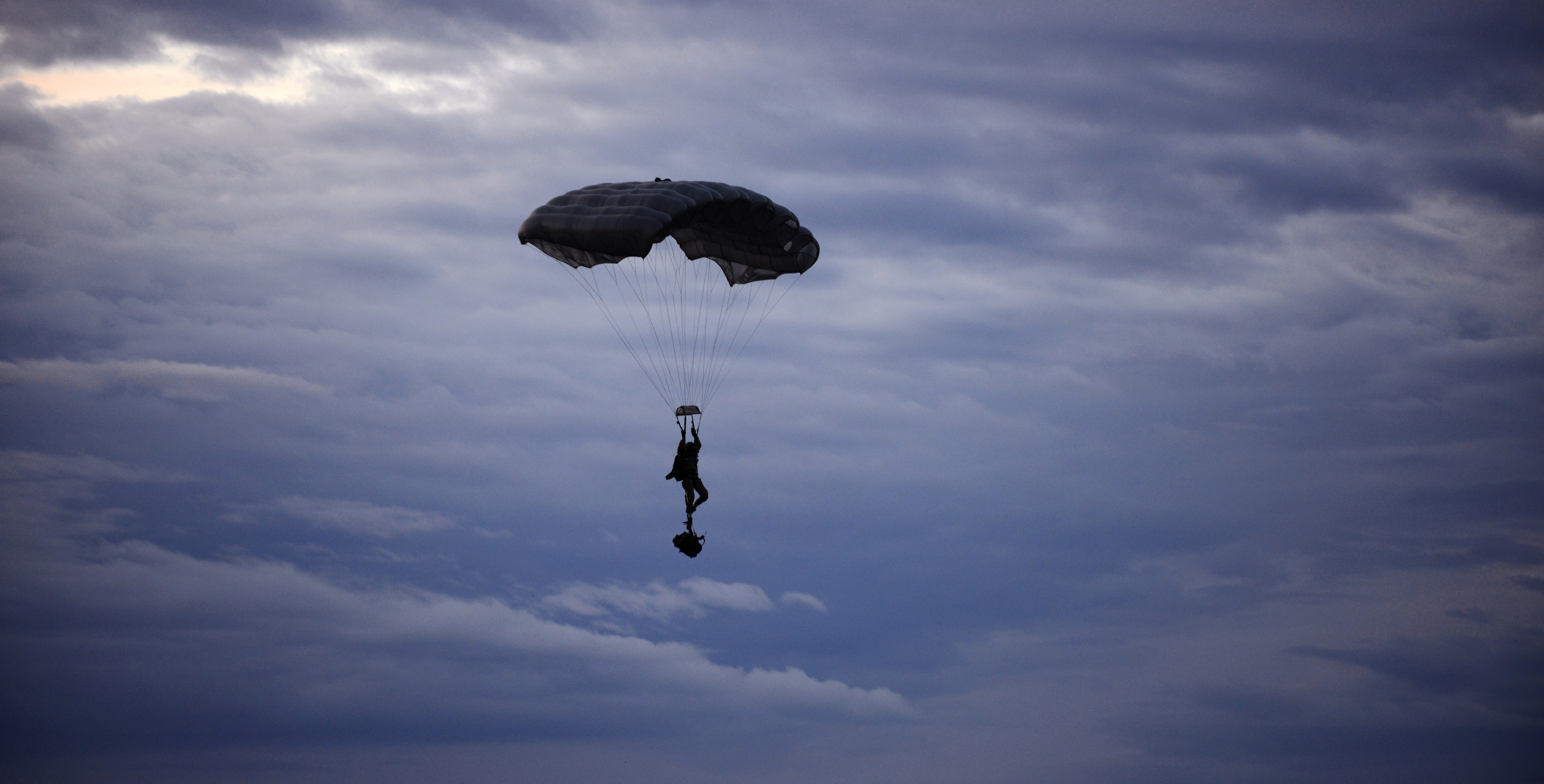
UK Pathfinder parachuting during Exercise Eagle's Eye

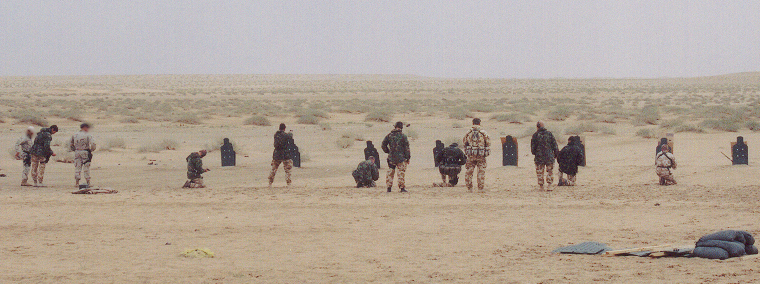
UK Pathfinders conducting pistol training in Kuwait alongside US Special Forces

== History ==
During the Second World War small groups of parachute soldiers were formed into pathfinder units, to parachute ahead of the main force. Their tasks were to mark the drop zones (DZ) or landing zones (LZ), set up radio beacons as a guide for the aircraft carrying the main force and to clear and protect the area as the main force arrive.

The units were formed into two companies to work with the two airborne divisions. The 21st Independent Parachute Company served with the 1st Airborne Division and the 22nd Independent Parachute Company served with the 6th Airborne Division. The 22nd Independent Parachute Company were amongst the lead elements of the 6th Airborne division's drop into Normandy as part of Operation Tonga; the 21st Independent Parachute Company took part in Operation Market Garden landing at Arnhem in September 1944. After marking the DZs and LSs The Company was trapped with the rest of the division in the Oosterbeek Perimeter.

After the war both companies were disbanded and in 1948, the army's parachute force was reduced to the 16 Parachute Brigade. Part of this reduction saw the formation of the No. 1 Guards Independent Parachute Company which became the pathfinder unit for the newly formed brigade. The Company deployed on a wide variety of operations between 1948 and 1977. It was deployed to Borneo during the Borneo Confrontation where it was trained as a special reconnaissance unit.

Following the 1982 Falklands War, 5 Airborne Brigade was established as a light, rapid reaction force for similar requirements. The brigade was formed from the two Parachute Regiment and one line infantry battalions and support units. The Brigade identified a requirement for an independent intelligence collection capability, deployable into a hostile or non-permissive environment ahead of the main force so in 1985 the Pathfinder Platoon was established with personnel drawn initially from the patrols platoon of each of the three Parachute Battalions. For many years it was not an officially established unit, being financed from other parts of the Brigade's budget. In 1999, 5 Airborne Brigade merged with 24 Airmobile Brigade to form the 16 Air Assault Brigade with the platoon remaining attached to the Brigade headquarters.

== Command, control and organisation ==
The platoon work under the command of the Brigade Combat Team Headquarters in Colchester, Essex. The Officer Commanding Pathfinder Platoon is a senior Captain or Major with an Operations Warrant Officer (OPSWO) as his second in command. The platoon operates in teams of between 4–6 men. In 2006 a new rate of Parachute Pay (High Altitude Parachute Pay) was introduced for members of the Pathfinder Platoon following the recommendations of the Armed Forces’ Pay Review Body.

== Operations ==
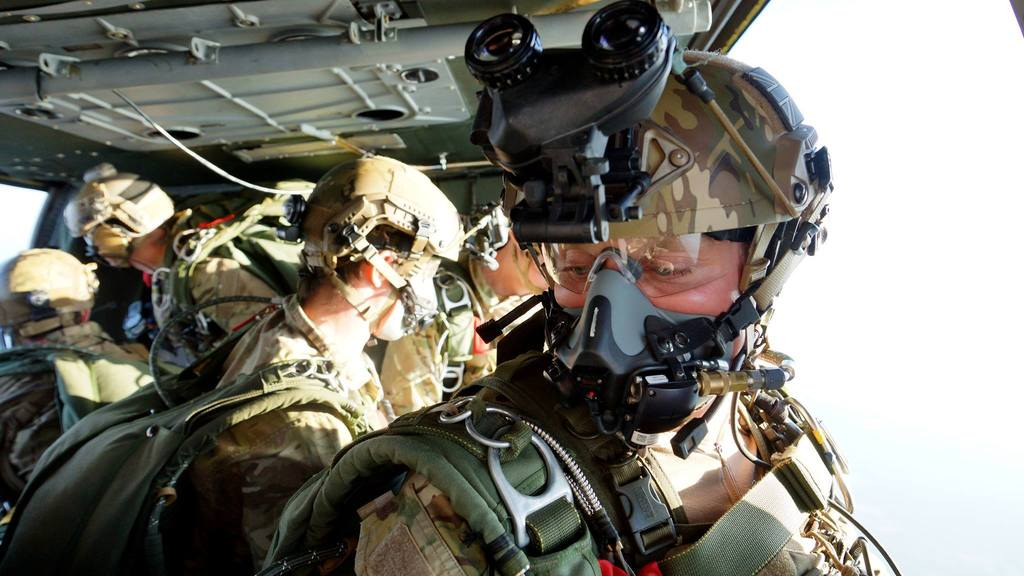
British Pathfinders conducting freefall training from a Blackhawk

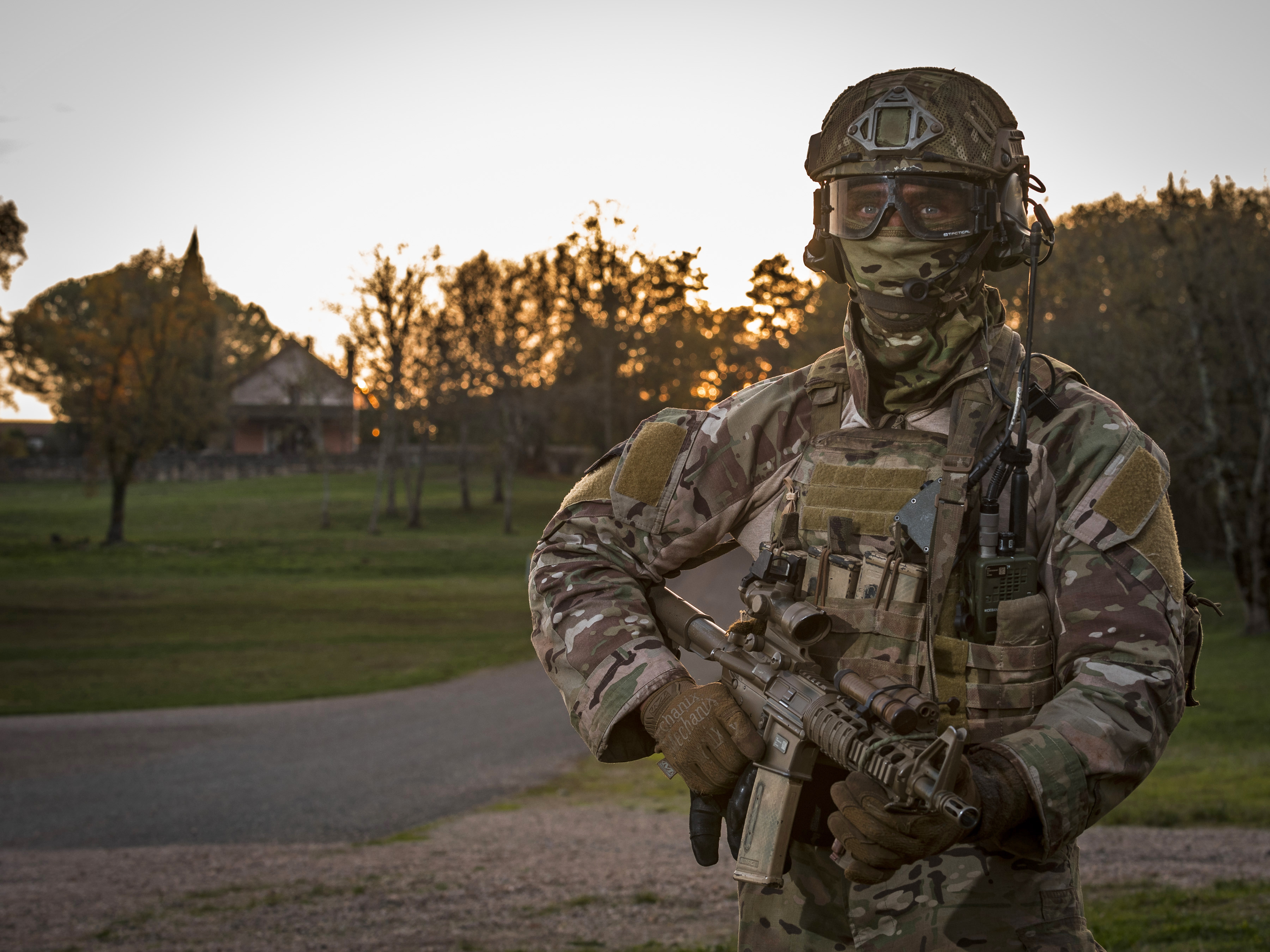
A member of the Pathfinder Platoon armed with an L119 rifle on Exercise Falcon Amarante

The present-day Pathfinder Platoon has taken part in operations in Yugoslavia, Sierra Leone, Macedonia, Afghanistan and Iraq.

In June 1999, they were part of Operation Agricola in Kosovo. The platoon provided reconnaissance and the forward air control of air assets, behind enemy lines, for NATO command several days before the main land offensive. Once NATO forces had entered Kosovo, the platoon was re-tasked to provide a defensive screen around Pristina International Airport prior to the arrival of the Russian forces.

Their next operation was Operation Palliser in Sierra Leone. The platoon deployed into Freetown on May 7, 2000, to assist the UNAMSIL efforts. Deployed around Lungi under the command of Sergeant Stephen Heaney, they were engaged by a Revolutionary United Front (RUF) force trying to capture the airport. The platoon, outnumbered 20 to one, fought throughout the night and repulsed the RUF, which suffered 20 dead without any loss to the platoon. For his actions during the engagement Heaney was awarded the Military Cross.

In 2001 the Pathfinder Platoon deployed for Operation Essential Harvest in the Republic of Macedonia supporting the Special Air Service in mapping the National Liberation Army (NLA) positions.

The platoon was deployed to the southern Afghan province of Helmand alongside the 3 Para Battle Group in 2006. The Pathfinders spent 52 days in the town of Musa Qal'eh and were engaged in fighting the Taliban for 26 of the 52 days.

By 19 May 2006, the Pathfinders joined the Afghan National Police (ANP) in a counterattack in Taliban-held territory. From there, a US B-1 Lancer bomber and A-10's were directed by PF forward air controllers (FACs) onto Taliban positions. They were then supplemented by French Super Etendards from the Charles de Gaulle aircraft carrier in the Indian Ocean. The men then set out on a four-day mission to a town in the north of Helmand province in Afghanistan, and ended up spending 52 days under siege by the Taliban. 25 men, who have been first into several Taliban-held areas during the British deployment in southern Afghanistan, came under such ferocious attack that they were forced to stay in Musa Qala fighting almost daily battles. The group was supposed to be reinforced by a company of 120 paratroopers but they had to be diverted to the town of Sangin when they came under heavy assault by Taliban insurgents. The platoon were finally replaced in Musa Qala when 500 British troops, in a mission codenamed Operation Snakebite broke through Taliban lines.

In 2010 the Pathfinders deployed again to Helmand, Afghanistan as the Brigade Reconnaissance Force operating throughout Helmand Province conducting reconnaissance tasks and offensive action tasks. During the course of this tour an attached soldier Pte John "Jack" Howard (3 Para) was killed in action during a strafing run from an American Close Air Support mission.

The Pathfinders regularly take part in Global Response, conducting training in North Macedonia and in Ukraine They also have spent time training the Jordanian Special Operation Forces (Jordan) along with various other forces.

In 2021 Pathfinders were deployed to Kabul taking part in Operation Pitting to assist in the evacuation of British nationals as well as eligible Afghans. The Pathfinders provided security to the airfield and assisted in locating personnel unable to get to the airport. This ended the 20 years that the UK was involved militarily in Afghanistan.

In September 2024 it was reported the Pathfinders were deployed to Lebanon to assist British Forces in the region participating in exercise Pegasus Cedar.

=== May 2026 humanitarian mission ===
On 9 May 2026, a team from the 16 Air Assault Brigade executed a first-of-its-kind emergency humanitarian mission, parachuting onto Tristan da Cunha to treat a British national with suspected hantavirus. A local island resident who disembarked from the virus-hit cruise ship MV Hondius. Oxygen supplies at the island's hospital had reached a critical level. The territory normally operates with just a two-person medical team. The team comprised six paratroopers from the Pathfinder Platoon, one specialist doctor and one military intensive care nurse. Due to the critical care required, an intensive care doctor and an intensive care nurse were strapped to paratroopers for tandem jumps. The nurse had done a civilian tandem jump before, but for the doctor, it was their first time.

An RAF A400M transport aircraft flew the team 6,788 km from RAF Brize Norton to Ascension Island, before flying another 3,000 km south, sustained by mid-air refuelling from an RAF Voyager tanker. Arriving at the drop zone 5 km northeast of the island, the team jumped from 2500 m so the winds exceeding 50 ln/h would blow them over land. Once the personnel were on the ground, the A400M air-dropped 3.3 tonnes of vital medical cargo and oxygen cylinders across three subsequent runs, successfully stabilising the island's healthcare emergency before returning to Ascension. HMS Medway was then dispatched from her post in the Falkland Islands on 14 May 2026. She sailed for seven days through notoriously rough waters to reach Tristan da Cunha. HMS Medway arrived off the coast on 22 May. Her primary objectives are to deliver six fresh civilian clinicians and heavy medical provisions to ensure long-term healthcare resilience on the island and extract the paratroopers and military medics to the Falklands. On 24 May, sea conditions allowed the military medics and paratroopers to board the ship using a Tristan Fisheries RIB, although some of the paratroopers' kit remained on the island and will be shipped at a later date. HMS Medway then set sail for the Falklands.

Operation	Country	Year
Operation Agricola	(Federal Republic of Yugoslavia) Kosovo	1999
Operation Palliser	Sierra Leone	2000
Operation Essential Harvest	Macedonia	2001
Operation Telic	Iraq	2003
Operation Herrick IV	Afghanistan	2006
Operation Herrick VIII	Afghanistan	2008
Operation Herrick XIII	Afghanistan	2010
Operation Pitting	Afghanistan	2021

== In popular culture ==
Books

- Kent, Ron (1979). First in!: Parachute Pathfinder Company: a history of the 21st Independent Parachute Company. B.T. Batsford. ISBN 0-7134-2199-1.
- Shortt, James; McBride, Angus (1981). The Special Air Service. Osprey Publishing. ISBN 0850453968.
- Gberie, Lansana (2005). A dirty war in West Africa. Indiana University Press. ISBN 0253218551.
- Blakeley, David (2013). Pathfinder: A Special Forces Mission Behind Enemy Lines. Orion. ISBN 978-1409129028.
- Blakeley, David (2014). Maverick One. Orion. ISBN 978-1409146636.
- Heaney MC, Steve (2015). Operation Mayhem. Orion. ISBN 978-1409148456.
- Heaney MC, Steve (2016). X Platoon. Orion. ISBN 978-1409148500.

Television

- BBC News: The battle for Musa Qala
- Defence of the Realm: Phantom Platoon (BBC Documentary)

== See also ==
- Brigade Patrol Troop - Royal Marines
- Surveillance and Reconnaissance Squadron - Royal Marines
- Commando Parachute Group - France
- 11th Airmobile Brigade (Netherlands) - Netherlands
- Pathfinders Company - Portugal
- 101st Airborne Division - U.S. Army air assault division similar to 16 Air Assault Brigade, with notable pathfinder platoon history
- United States Army Pathfinder School - responsible for training U.S. pathfinders
