= Witch of the Wave =

Clipper, launched 1851

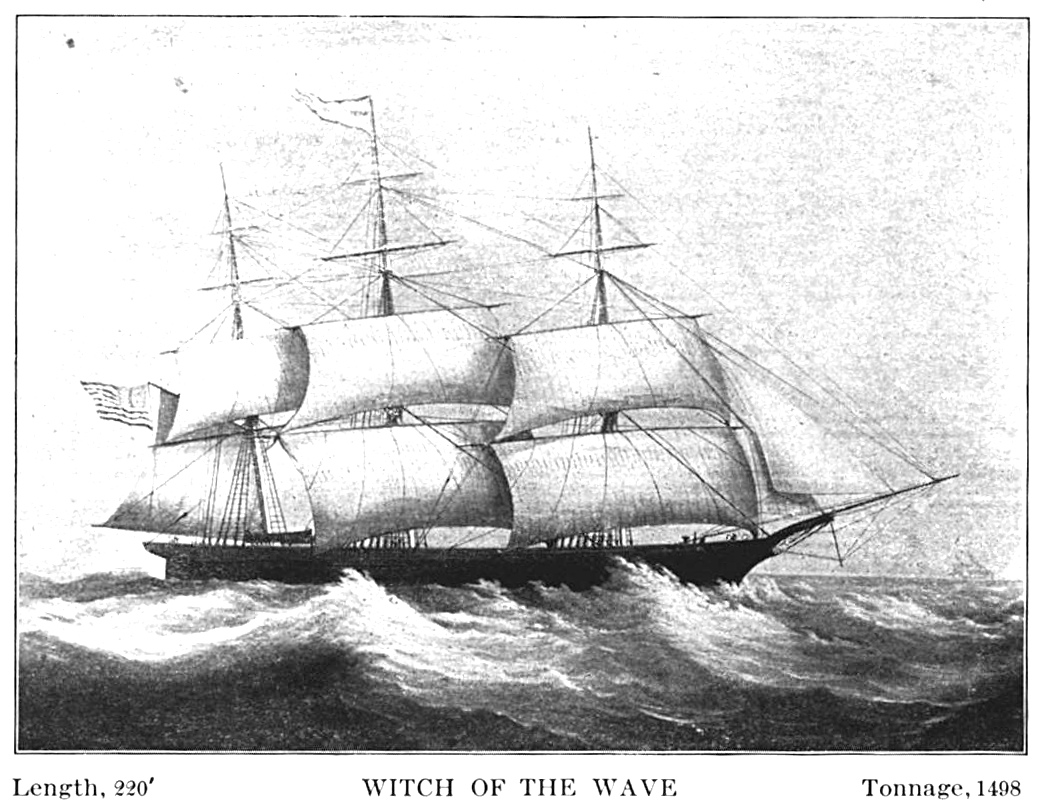

History

United States
- Name: Witch of the Wave
- Owner: Glidden & Williams, Hunt & Peabody, Boston, MA
- Builder: George Raynes, Portsmouth, NH
- Cost: $80,000
- Launched: April 5, 1851
- Fate: Sold to the Netherlands, 1855

Netherlands
- Owner: Van Eighen & Co., 1871
- Acquired: 1855
- Renamed: Electra
- Fate: Listed in 1886 RAFS; not listed in 1887

General characteristics
- Class & type: Extreme clipper
- Tons burthen: 1498 tons OM
- Length: 220 ft. LOA
- Beam: 40 ft.
- Draft: 21 ft.
- Notes: Full-rigged ship, listed as barque in 1882 RAFS

Witch of the Wave was a long-lived extreme clipper in the California trade, with a sailing life of over 34 years. In 1851, she sailed from Calcutta to Boston in 81 days, setting a record. It was renamed the Electra in 1871.

== Construction ==
Her figurehead was a young woman in a flowing white gossamer dress, with gold. One arm was extended, and she stood atop the crest of a wave in bare feet. The stern ornament was a seashell with a child, being drawn by dolphins. Both decorations were designed by John W. Mason, of Boston.

The cabins and staterooms featured luxurious finish work, "the wainscot of the main cabin being of rosewood, birdseye maple, satin and zebra wood, exquisitely polished, with cornices and mouldings of white and gold."

Clark describes a party of two hundred people greeting the arrival of the Witch of the Wave in Salem, Massachusetts.

At about eleven o'clock, everything being ready, the Witch of the Wave, with colors flying and the Boston Cadet Band on board playing "The Star Spangled Banner," was towed out into the stream amid the shouts and cheers of a multitude of people, who thronged the wharves and shipyards along the river. After passing through the Narrows and rounding New Castle Point, the R. B. Forbes, which had been towing alongside, took her hawser out ahead and shaped a course for Cape Ann, which brought the wind well over the starboard quarter. The breeze had freshened, though the sea was still quite smooth, and this, with the clear, blue sky and bright sunshine, made a day altogether too fine to be spent on shore.

Many of those on board were interested to see what effect some canvas would have on the new clipper, so Mr. Raynes said to Captain Bertram that he thought it might perhaps be a good plan to set some sail, "just to assist the tow-boat a little." Captain Bertram, with a twinkle in his eye, said he thought so, too, and gave orders to loose the topsails, jib, and foretopmast staysail. The Witch of the Wave had a crew of Portsmouth riggers ... and it did not take them long to put the topsails on her. As soon as the yards were braced, she began to dart through the water like a fish, and soon ranged up on the weather beam of the R. B. Forbes, the hawser towing between them with the bight skipping along among the blue waves in showers of sparkling spray. On board the R. B. Forbes the safety valve was lifting, with steam at thirty pounds pressure ... There was great joy on board the Witch of the Wave, with clapping of hands and waving of handkerchiefs, while the band struck up "A Life on the Ocean Wave." The log was hove, and she took nine and one half knots off the reel. The topsail yards were then lowered on the caps, and the reef tackles hauled out, yet with only this small canvas, the R. B. Forbes did not have much towing to do ...

== Career ==
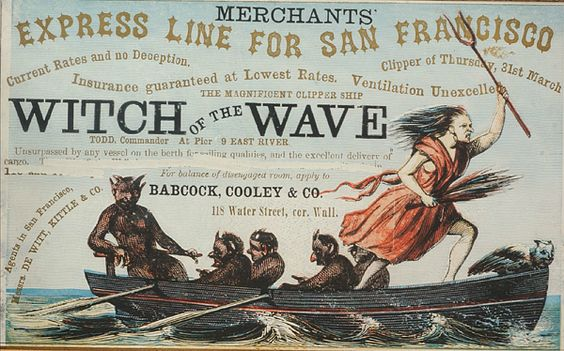
Clipper ship sailing card

Witch of the Wave set the record for the passage from Sand Heads, Calcutta, to Boston—81 days, in 1853. During this passage, Witch of the Wave also tied a record set by the clipper Typhoon—37 days from Calcutta to the Cape of Good Hope.

On January 23, 1853, Witch of the Wave put into Singapore, just nine days out from Hong Kong. She had sustained damage to her rudder as the result of a collision with the barque Spartan.

On August 16, 1853, Witch of the Wave left Boston bound for San Francisco as a participant in a race with six other ships. She sailed the voyage under Capt. Lewis F. Miller and arrived in San Francisco after 117 days, beating the Raven, the Comet, and the Trade Wind. Six clippers in all arrived in San Francisco within 30 hours of Witch of the Wave, the other two being Mandarin and Hurricane.

In 1855, Witch of the Wave was renamed the Electra by new owners in Amsterdam. She was still listed in Amsterdam in 1871, with Van Eeghen & Co. as owners.

=== Voyages ===
- Boston to San Francisco
  - Capt. J. Hardy Millet, 123 days, 1851
  - Capt. Benjamin Tay, 119 days, 1852
  - Capt. Lewis F. Miller, 117 days, 1853
- Whampoa to London, 91 days, 1852
  - 19,000 chests of tea as cargo
  - Best day's run for this voyage was 338 mi.
- San Francisco to Singapore, Capt. Lewis F. Miller, 46 days, 1854
- Singapore to Calcutta, 18 days, 1854
- Calcutta to Boston, 102 days, 1855
- Boston to Batavia, Capt. Shreve, 76 days, 1855
- Batavia to Amsterdam; chartered for repeat voyage, 1855
