= Royal Military Band "Johan Willem Friso" =

Dutch military band

Royal Military Band “Johan Willem Friso”
- Koninklijke Militaire Kapel “Johan Willem Friso”
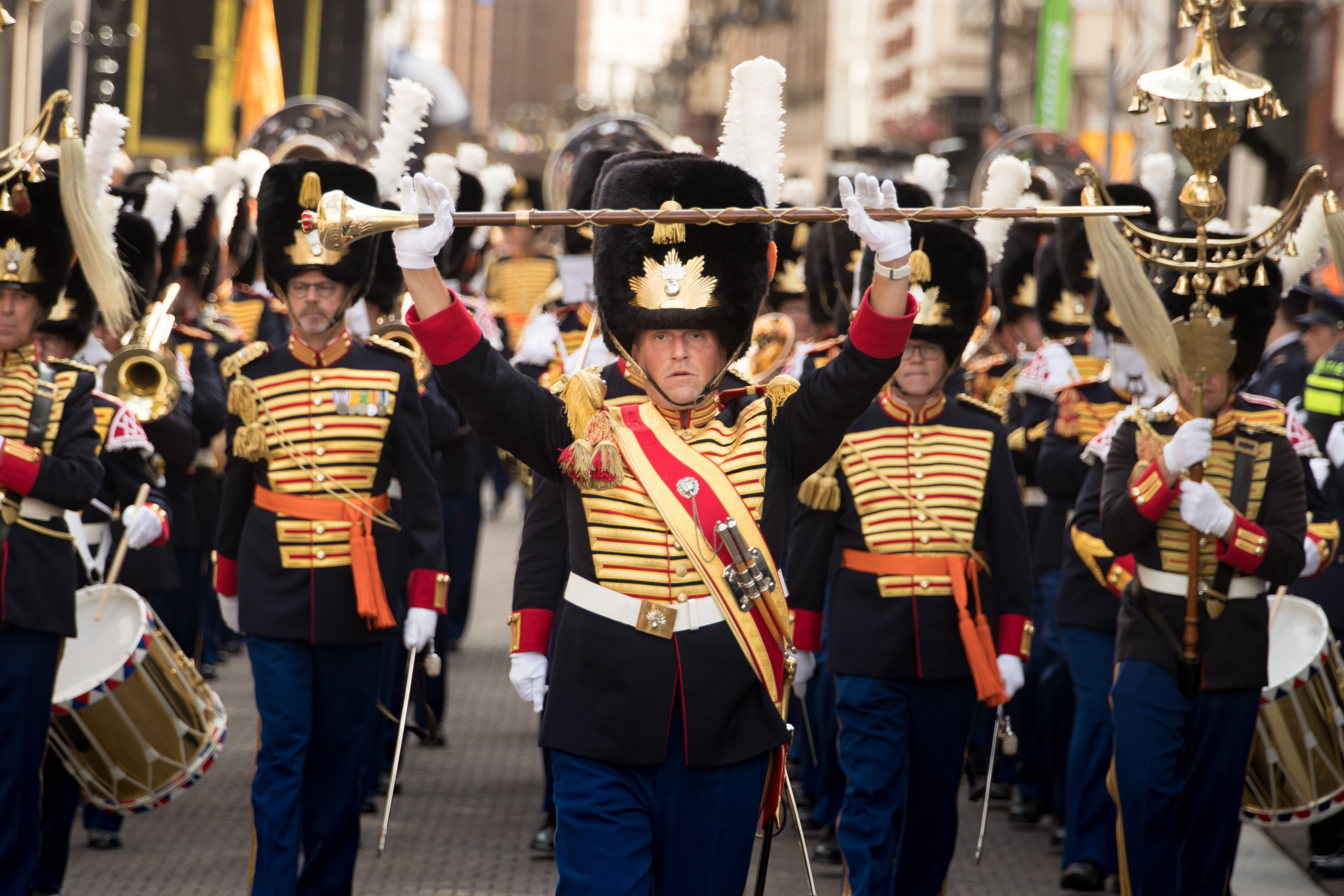
- The band during Prinsjesdag in 2018.
- Active: 1829 – present
- Country: Netherlands
- Branch: Royal Netherlands Army
- Type: Military Band
- Size: 50
- Part of: Grenadiers' and Rifles Guard Regiment; Regiment Infanterie Johan Willem Friso
- Headquarters: Johan Willem Friso Barracks, Assen
- Patron: John William Friso, Prince of Orange
- Website: https://www.defensie.nl/onderwerpen/m/muziek/koninklijke-militaire-kapel-johan-willem-friso

Commanders
- Chief conductor: Major Frans-Aert Burghgraef (Since October 2023)
- Notable commanders: François Dunkler Sr. (first Bandmaster); Johannes Petrus Laro

The Royal Military Band "Johan Willem Friso" (Dutch: Koninklijke Militaire Kapel "Johan Willem Friso), also informally called the Band of the Royal Netherlands Army or the Johan Willem Friso Military Band is a military unit in the Royal Netherlands Army which is the seniormost of all the military bands in the Netherlands Armed Forces, as well as the oldest of the four professional bands currently in the army. It provides musical support for ceremonial events of national importance involving the army, the government, and the Dutch royal house. The repertoire of the band ranges from a variety of different genres, including military marches and contemporary/classical arrangements of symphonic music.

== History ==
On 7 July 1829, William I of the Netherlands ordered that a music corps be established for the then Grenadier Regiment with 18 professional musicians and 10 conscript youths. The first public performance took place on 8 April 1830 on the occasion of the sixth birthday of Princess Sophie daughter of the William II. After the retirement of François Dunkler as bandmaster in 1849, he was succeeded by his son François Dunkler Jr, a clarinet player in the 11th Infantry Division. Dunkler Jr. Dunkler brought many merits and fame to the band over the course of the following 10 years, collectively winning second place at a musical competition in Paris. William III recognized personally these accomplishments by granting Dunkler Jr. the honorary title of Director of Music in 1861.

Under the direction of Nicolaas Arie Bouwman, the band made a concert trip to Ghent, Belgium, on the occasion of the World Exhibition of 1913. The band was also present when Wilhelmina returned to her residence (Anneville) in 1945 following the allied victory in the Second World War. During the immediate post-war period, the focal points of military music were centered around concert bands. In addition, military tattoos were developed and as a result, the band gained more close international contacts, specifically in the NATO and European Union sphere. The country became widely known for the large military tattoos that were held annually. In connection with this, Anne Posthumus, who had previously been bandmaster of the Suriname Forces Band, became director of music of the band.

Posthumus was succeeded on 1 March 1978 by Jan van Ossenbruggen, who was then succeeded on 1 April 1986 by Pierre Kuijpers van Ossenbruggen as the first conductor of the Royal Military Band in The Hague. During his tenure, he began efforts for the introduction of symphonic wind music, creating many CD recordings with the band. The Royal Military Band "Johan Willem Friso" was created on 1 January 2005, after a period of reorganization of military music organizations, which led to the disbandment of four then existing bands within the Royal Netherlands Army. It was a result of a merger between The Hague band and the Assen band of the Johan Willem Friso Infantry Regiment. In addition the band also welcomed musicians from the Brass Band of the Rifles' Guard Regiment, also fused into the RMB as a result of the merger of that regiment with the Grenadier Guards Regiment.

== Musical support ==
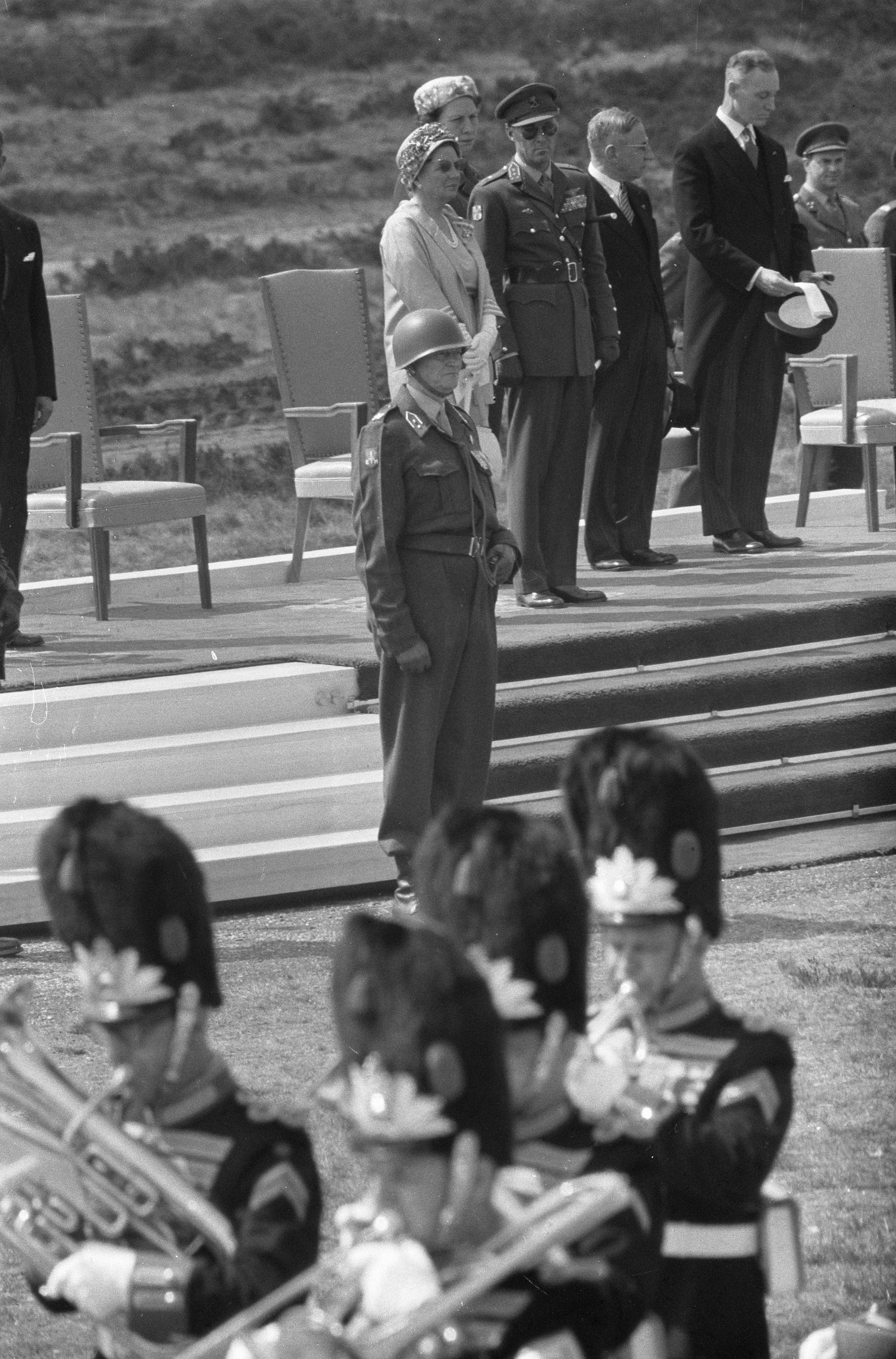
The then Royal Central Military Band at a 1960 Bevrijdingsdag Military Parade.

The Royal Military Band "Johan Willem Friso" serves primarily as the musical accompaniment at military events and ceremonial occasions within and outside the armed forces. Its musicians give concerts, tattoos and shows at home and abroad. The band provides musical support to the Grenadiers' and Rifles Guard Regiment alongside the Traditional Corps of Drums of the Grenadier Regiment and the Rifles' Guards Regiment Drum and Bugle Corps (both formations staffed by veterans and reservists), due to the few number of military bands in active service in the Dutch Army, moreover it is assisted by the Veterans' Drum and Bugle Corps of the Johan Wilem Frisco Infantry Regiment. Aside from being the official band of the Grenadiers' and Rifles Guard Regiment it supports the activities of other regiments of the Army and of the Corps of Cadets, Koninklijke Militaire Academie, alternately with the brass bands of the RNA.

It supports the following annual and occasional events in the country:

- Koningsdag
- Prinsjesdag
- Veteranendag
- Bevrijdingsdag
- Dag van de Strijdkrachten
- State Visits (Staatsbezoek)
- Presentation of credentials (Presentatie van de geloofsbrief)
- Royal weddings (Koninklijke Huwelijken)
- State funeral (Staatsbegrafenis)
- Inaugurations (Inhuldiging)
- Change of command (Verandering van commando)
- Military tattoos, Veterans Day and concerts (including Liberation Day concerts)

== Organization ==
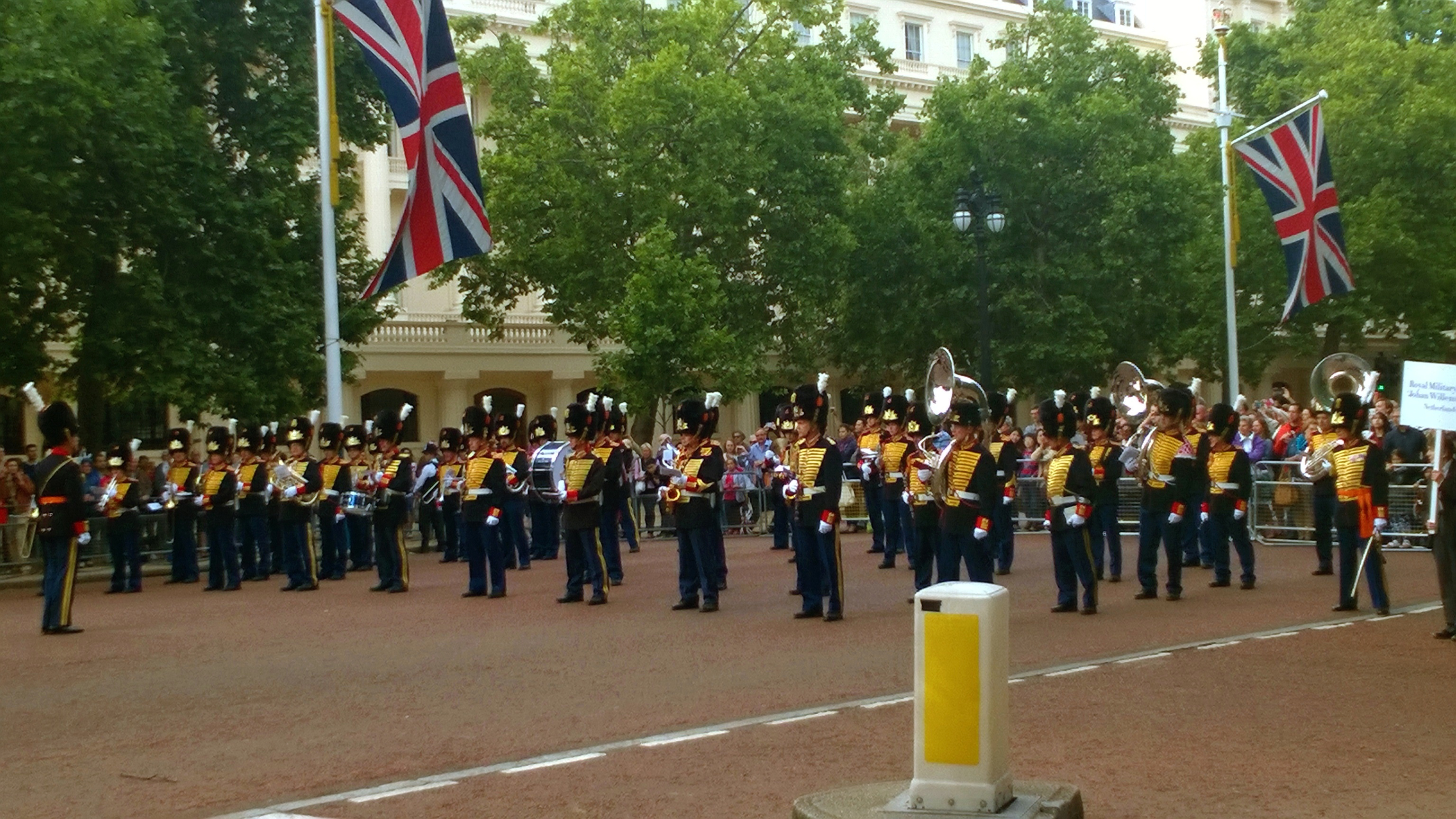
The band on The Mall in London, 22 June 2015.

The band consists of 50 professional musicians who fall under the woodwind, brass and percussion sections. In addition, smaller ensembles can also be formed from the band, such as the following:

- Marching Band – This is used during parades and events where the band is required to stay standing up for a long period of time. They wear the uniform of the former Grenadier Guards Regiment.
- Big Band – It plays at official receptions and concerts. It has a very diverse repertoire, ranging from jazz, classical and pop
- Noord-Nederlands Clarinet Quartet
- Wind Quintet
- Brass ensemble

The band has a five member permanent staff which includes the following people: Band Commander, the Bandmaster, the Drum Major, a road manager and an office manager.

== See also ==
- Royal Netherlands Army
- Military band
- Grenadiers' and Rifles Guard Regiment

== Links ==
- Netherlands Royal Military Band Waterloo 200 parade London on YouTube
- The Royal Netherlands Army Band - Hamina Tattoo 03 August 2012 on YouTube
