= Grenadiers' and Rifles Guard Regiment =

Grenadiers' and Rifles Guards Regiment
- Garde Grenadiers en Jagers
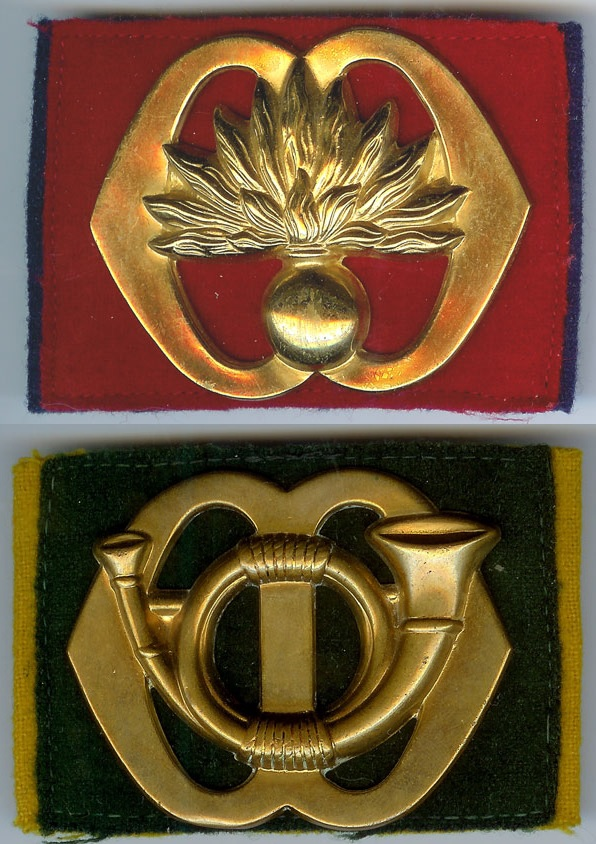
- The two cap badges of the Garderegiment Grenadiers en Jagers
- Active: 1829–present
- Country: Netherlands
- Branch: Royal Netherlands Army
- Type: Foot Guards
- Role: 11 Battalion - Air assault 11 Staff Company - Headquarters
- Size: One battalion Four companies
- Part of: 11 Luchtmobiele (Airmobile) Brigade
- Garrison/HQ: Oranjekazerne, Schaarsbergen
- Nickname: Kingscoy (Kings company)
- Mottos: Grenadiers: Grenadiers vooraan! Rifles: Allez Chasse!
- March: Grenadiers March
- Engagements: Ten Days Campaign; Battle of the Netherlands; Ypenburg en Ockenburg 1940; Operatie Product; Operatie Kraai; Bosnian War; Cyprus (1998-1999); Kosovo War; Republic of Macedonia (2001); War in Afghanistan (2001–2003, 2006-present); Iraq conflict (2003–present)

Commanders
- Current commander: Lieutenant colonel Ron Sensen

The Grenadiers and Rifles Guards Regiment (Dutch: Garderegiment Grenadiers en Jagers) is a regiment of the Royal Netherlands Army; along with the Garderegiment Fuseliers Prinses Irene it is one of the two Dutch Guard regiments.

== History ==
The two antecedent regiments were formed in 1829 following the withdrawal of the regiments of Swiss mercenaries from Dutch service. Willem I ordered that two regiments would be formed to replace the Swiss, to serve as his guards. Both served with distinction, especially during the Second World War in the defence of The Hague. The regiment was formed in 1995 by the amalgamation of two antecedent regiments, the Garderegiment Grenadiers (Grenadiers Guards Regiment) and the Garderegiment Jagers (Rifles Guards Regiment).

== Organization ==
The regiment's single battalion currently serves in the airmobile role as part of 11 Luchtmobiele (Airmobile) Brigade. It is organised with an HQ Company (Stafcompagnie), a heavy weapons company (Zwarewapenscompagnie) and three infantry companies (Infanteriecompagnie). The three infantry companies and the anti-tank company perpetuate the two antecedent regiments, with 'A' (Koningscompagnie) and 'D' (Wolvencompagnie) companies being classed as Grenadiers and 'B' (Stiercompagnie) and 'C' (Tijgercompagnie) Companies being classed as Jagers (Rifles).

The regiment has a museum in Arnhem.

== Bands ==
Serving the Guards in musical support, the few numbers of military bands in service, are the Royal Military Band "Johan Willem Friso" and the Traditional Grenadier Bugle Band of the Grenadiers' and Rifles Guard Regiment (Grenadiers) and the Veterans Fanfare band and Bugles and Fanfare orchestra of the Grenadiers and Rifles (Rifles). These are the only bands in service in the Guards units of the RNA as the Band and Corps of Drums of the Garderegiment Fuseliers Prinses Irene remain disbanded. The present day fanfare brass band (known as the Regimentsfanfare) consists of 21 musicians and a permanent conductor. It has existed since 5 September 2005. A brass quintet has existed within the regiment since 2007.

== Battle honours ==
- Honours
  - Tiendaagse Veldtocht 1831
  - Ypenburg en Ockenburg 1940
  - West-Java 1946 - 1949
  - East Java 1947 - 1949
  - Sangin 2007
- Metalen Kruis

== Gallery ==
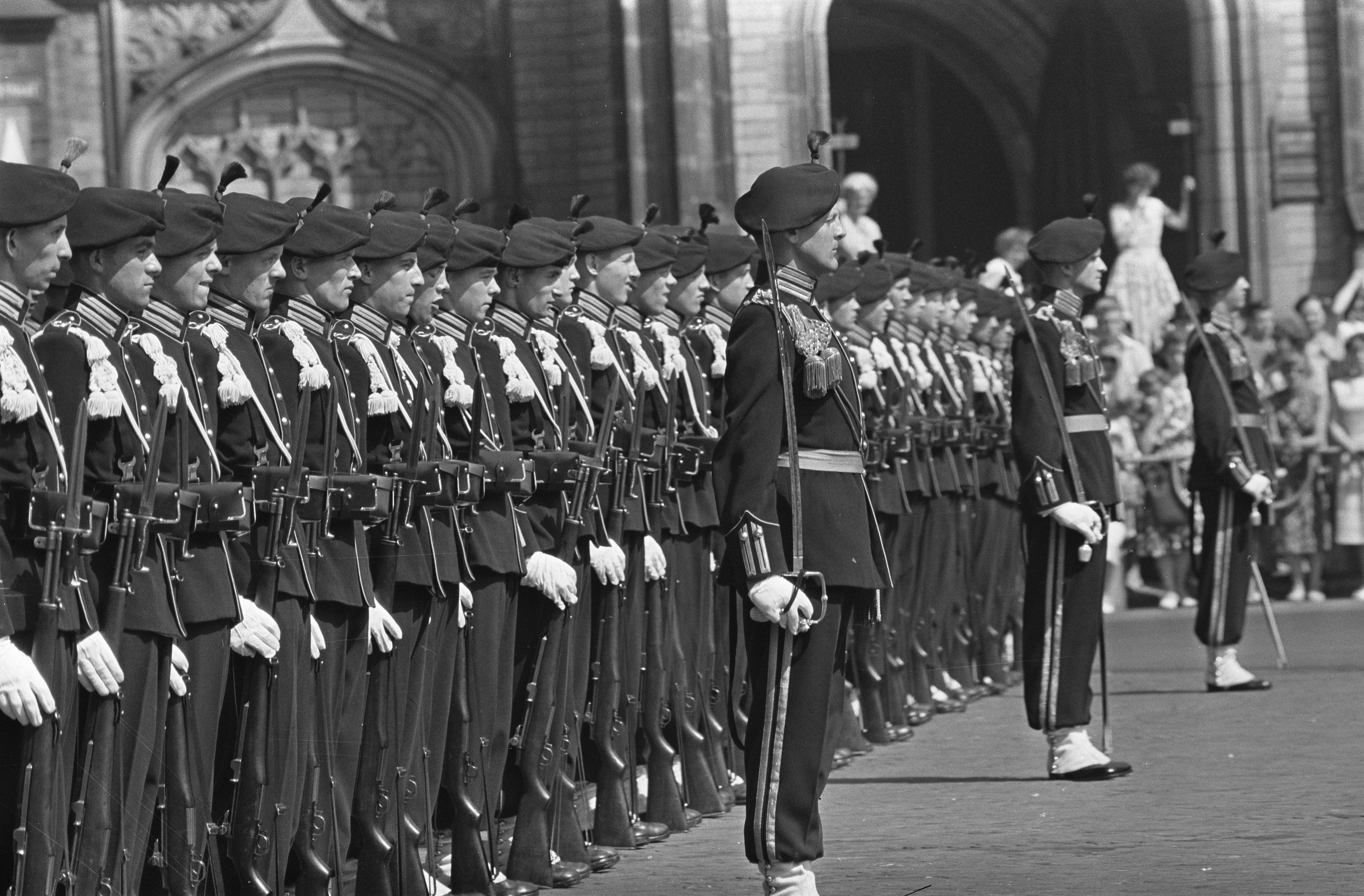
Garderegiment Jagers during the state visit of King Baudouin in 1959

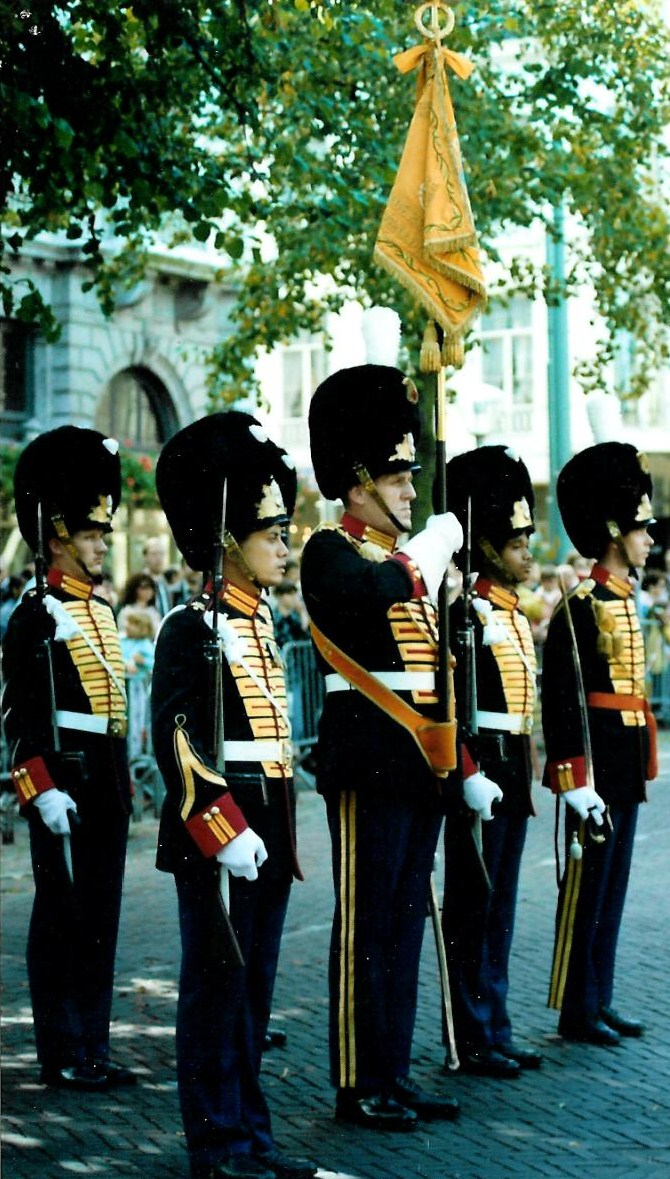
The standard of the Garderegiment Grenadiers in 1992/

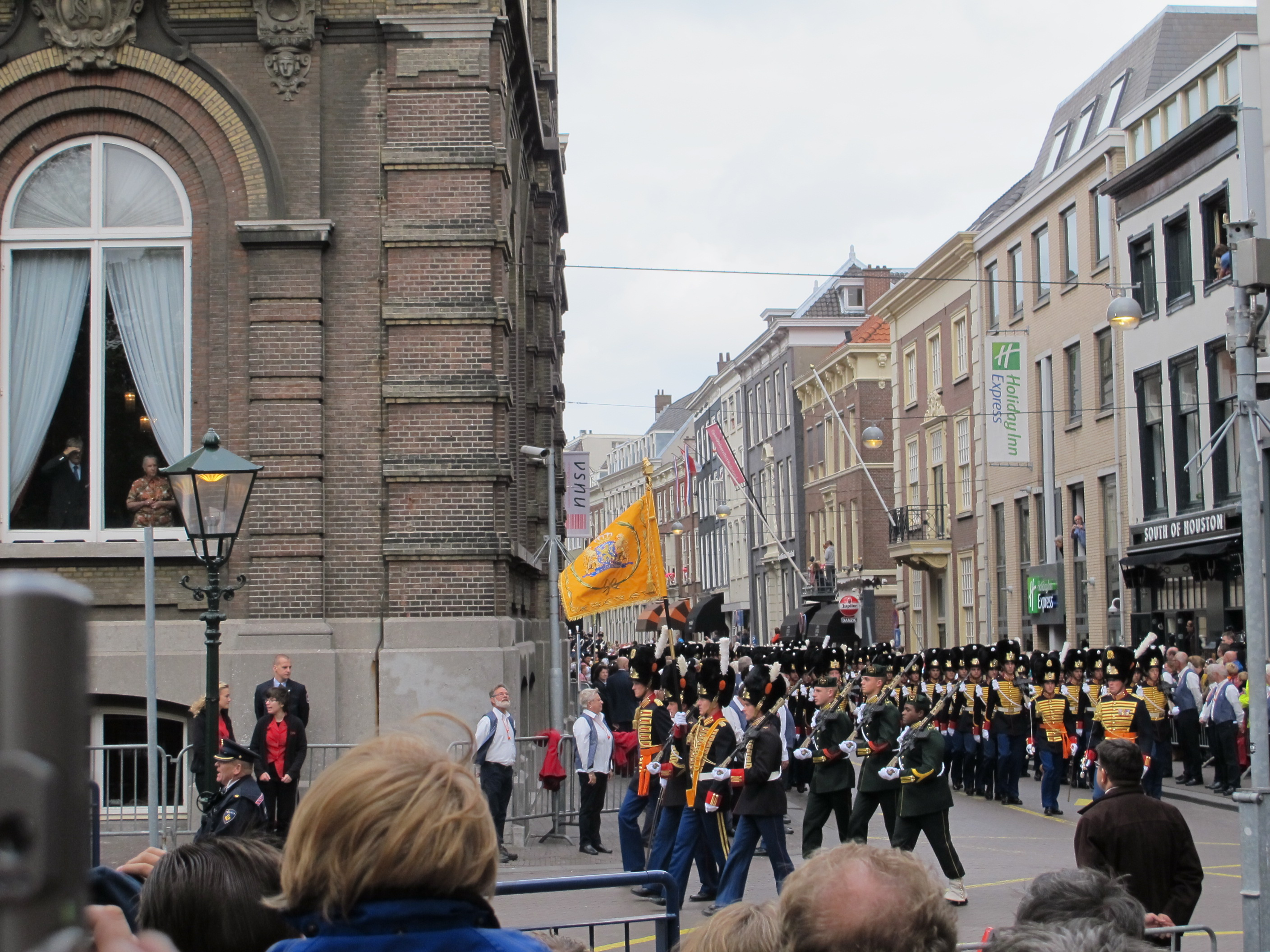
Grenadiers and Jagers march through The Hague on Prinsjesdag, 2013.

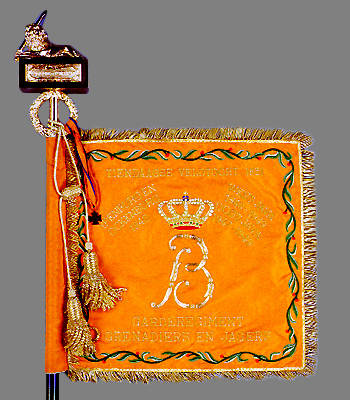
The regimental banner.

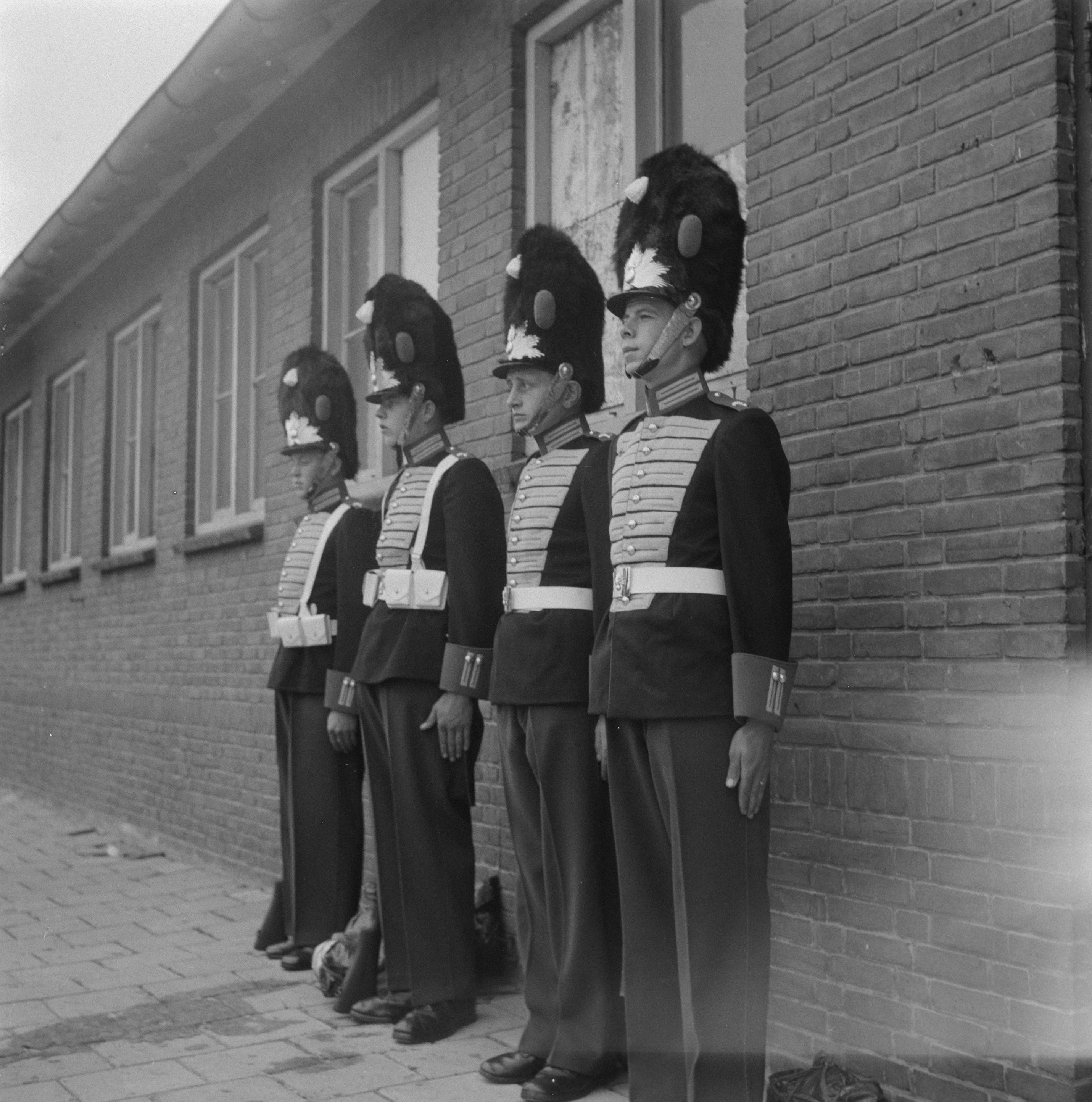
Members of the regiment in full dress uniform in September 1948.

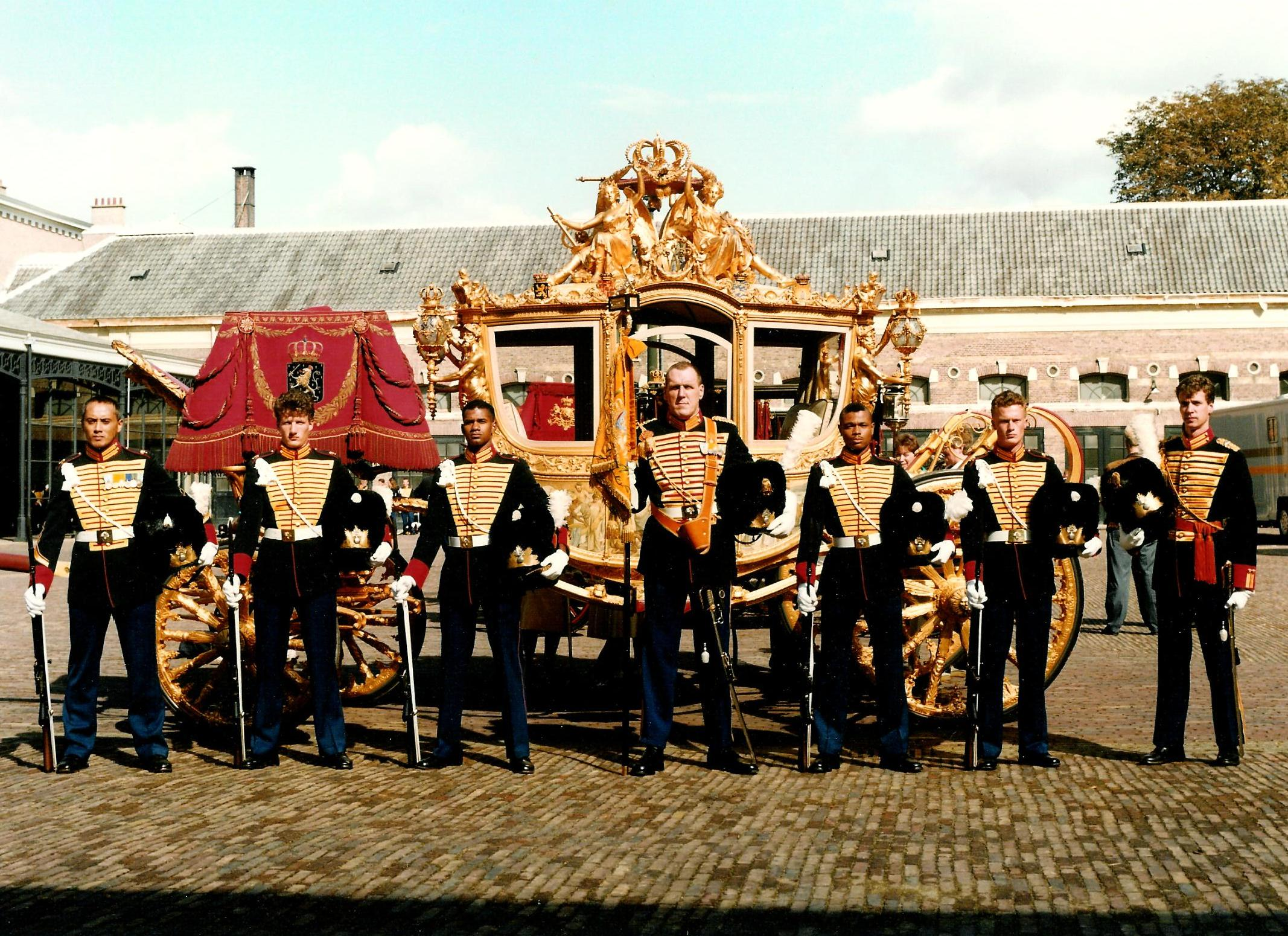
Members of the regiment during Prinsjesdag in 1992.
