= RM Stonehouse =

Royal Marines base in Plymouth, England

Stonehouse Barracks
- Plymouth
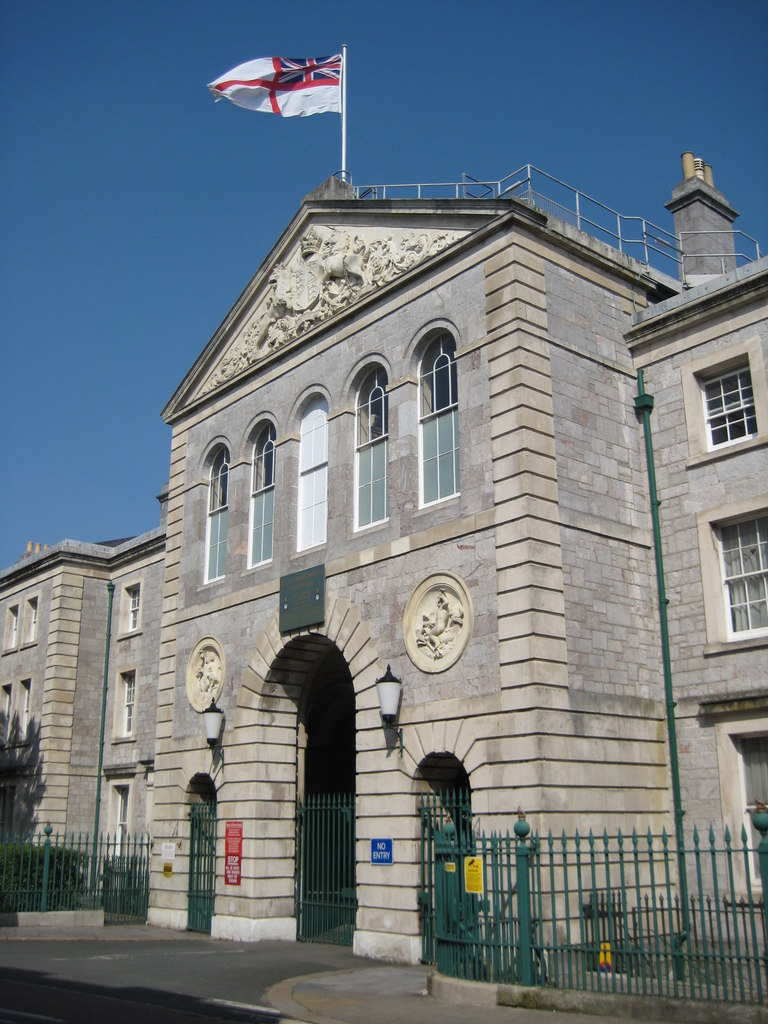
- Stonehouse Barracks

Site information
- Type: Royal Marines Base
- Owner: Ministry of Defence
- Operator: Royal Navy
- Controlled by: Royal Marines
- Website: RM Stonehouse - Royal Navy

Location
- Location within Devon Stonehouse Barracks (the United Kingdom)
- Coordinates: 50.36713°N 4.16238°W

Site history
- Built: 1756
- Built for: Admiralty
- In use: 1756–present

Garrison information
- Garrison: UK Commando Force
- Occupants: 30 Commando Information Exploitation Group

Stonehouse Barracks, or RM Stonehouse, is a military installation at Stonehouse, Plymouth. It is the home of the UK Commando Force and referred to by commandos as 'the spiritual home of the Royal Marines'.

== Origins ==
Since the Corps' foundation in 1664, Marines have been quartered in Plymouth. Following their formation into three divisions in 1775, His Majesty's Marine Forces became the first corps in Britain to be fully accommodated in their own barracks, which were established in the three divisional towns of Chatham, Portsmouth and Plymouth; Stonehouse is the only one of these to have survived.

As a whole, Stonehouse is described as "the oldest and most important group of barracks in England not forming part of a fortification: a very rare example of C18 planning, and a complex of great historic value".

== History ==
The earliest parts of Stonehouse Barracks date from 1756, but the main phase of construction was undertaken between 1779 and 1785 by James Templer and Thomas Parlby, with later additions in the 19th century by Colonel Godfrey Greene.

=== 18th century ===
The original 1780s barracks complex consisted of a rectangular parade ground bounded by a long symmetrical barrack range on the east side (which provided accommodation for the 'private marines') together with a matching pair of shorter, officers' barrack blocks to the north and south. The south block included houses at either end for the commandant and his deputy; the north block housed the more junior officers. The west side of the parade ground was closed off with railings and gates, with a small guard house (topped by a clock and cupola) in the centre. A 'canteen' was built at the east end of the south range, and a separate infirmary to the north.

The east and south blocks remain in situ and in use (though both were extended in the mid-19th century); the east block is said to be 'one of the earliest surviving barracks for a large unit of men in England'.

=== 19th century ===
During the Napoleonic Wars a decision was taken to expand the barracks; this was achieved by purchasing land to the south. A building was also acquired: standing at a short distance from the main quadrangle, the Longroom had served as a public Assembly Rooms since 1760 (predating the building of barracks); it was acquired from the town council in 1805 and converted to serve as an officers' mess. In 1818, the officers moved back to a rebuilt mess complex in the south-east corner of the main barracks, and the Longroom was reconfigured to serve as a school for the children of non-commissioned officers. Later, during the rebuilding of the north range of the barracks, the old infirmary was built over; so from 1859 the Longroom found a new use as an infirmary. A pair of houses were built nearby to house the surgeon and assistant surgeon. The Longroom is still part of the barracks, currently used as a gymnasium.

During the Crimean War there were further moves to expand the barracks and much rebuilding followed. In around 1860 the east barracks block was extended northwards to accommodate more men, and the south block was extended westwards, providing accommodation for more officers. The north range, however, was entirely rebuilt (longer and further to the north, giving the site its present irregular shape). The archway block on Durnford Street, which forms the west side of the parade ground, also dates from this period (1867–71); the range consists of a set of six houses for senior officers, administrative offices and a chapel (originally a schoolroom) above the central entrance arch. A rare survival from the 1830s is a former racquet court, which was converted into a theatre at the time of this rebuilding.

=== 20th century ===
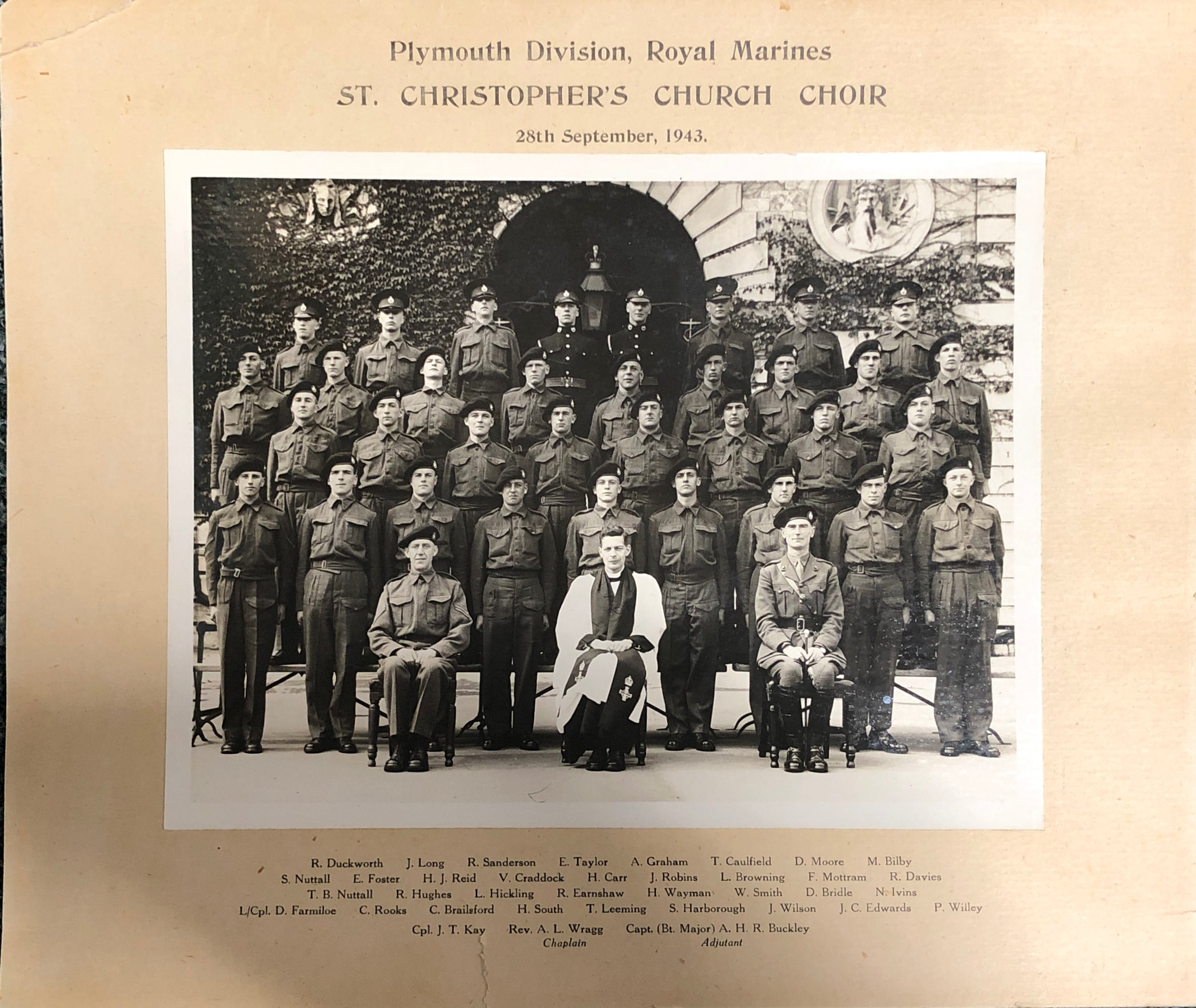
Stonehouse Barracks Church Choir during World War II; 28 September 1943

The divisional structure of the Royal Marines (with divisions based at Chatham, Portsmouth and Plymouth) was dismantled during the Second World War although elements of 41 Commando remained at the barracks after the war. In 1961 the barracks became the home of 43 Commando, a unit which disbanded in 1967, but the barracks accommodated 45 Commando until it moved to RM Condor in 1971. In that year, the barracks became the headquarters of 3 Commando Brigade.

== Present day ==
The barracks remain in current use as the headquarters of UK Commando Force.

== Cadets ==
RM Stonehouse also accommodates:

- Plymouth Division of the Royal Marines Volunteer Cadet Corps
- Band of the Royal Marines Volunteer Cadet Corps Plymouth

== Future ==
In September 2016 the Ministry of Defence announced that Stonehouse Barracks were to be sold off. A Better Defence Estate, published in November 2016, indicates that the site will be disposed of by 2023. In March 2019 it was reported that the closure of the Barracks had been put off until 2027, with plans for a replacement headquarters base having been shelved. The closure date was again later extended to at least 2029, and once more to 2031.

== Gallery ==
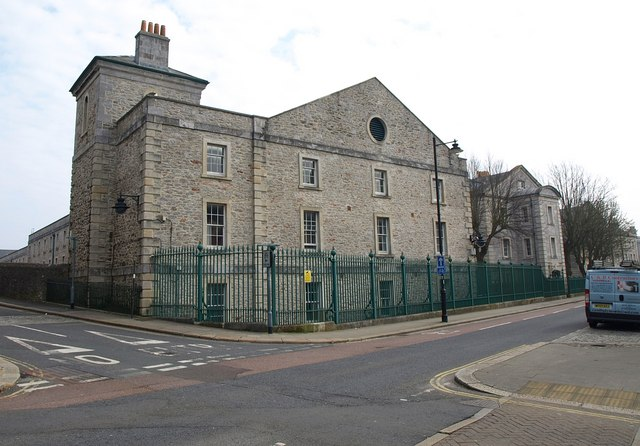
North-west corner of the north barracks block (part of the 1860s expansion of the site by Col. Godfrey Greene).

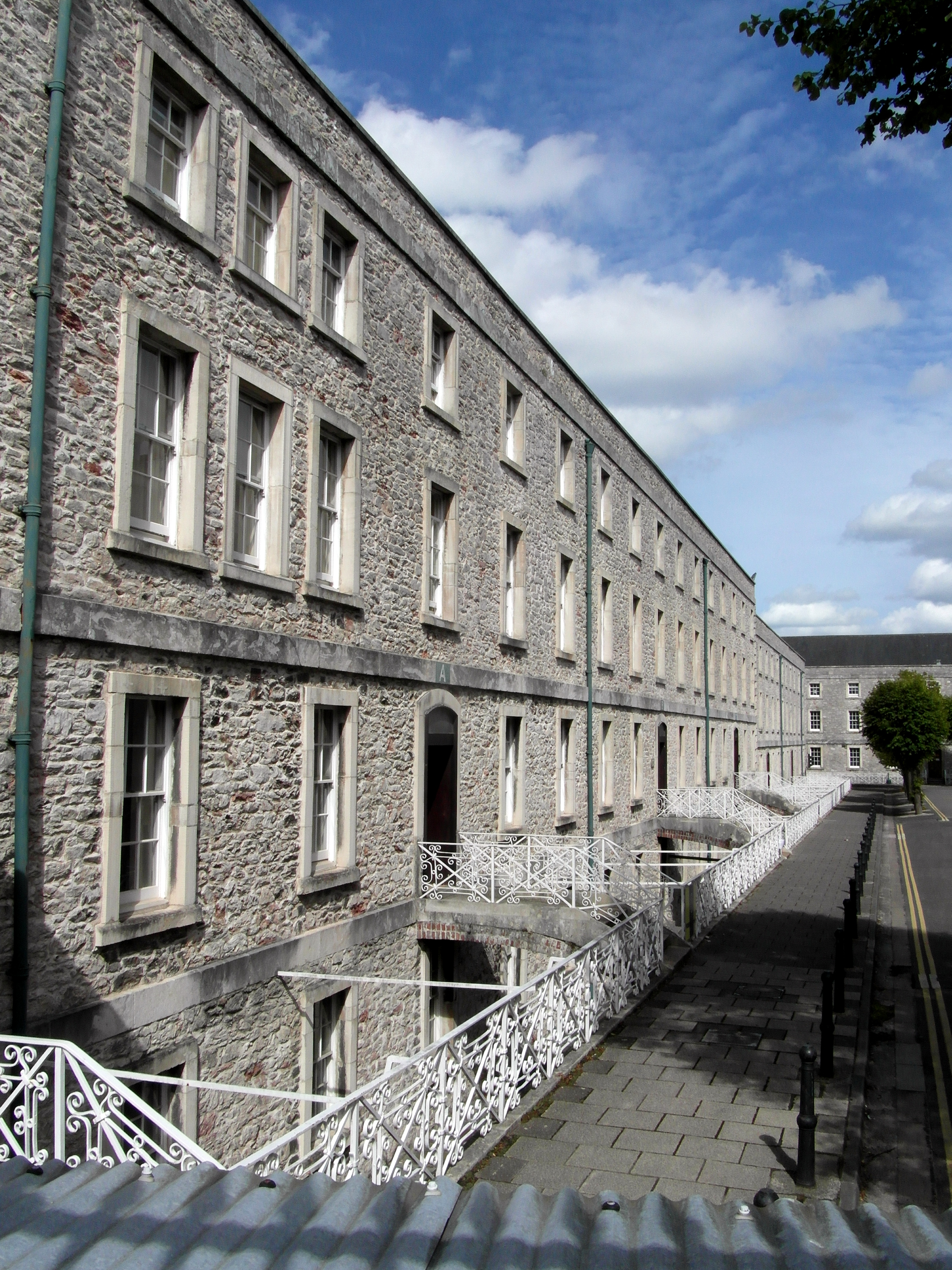
North barracks block, built c.1860; replaced the original 1780s north block.

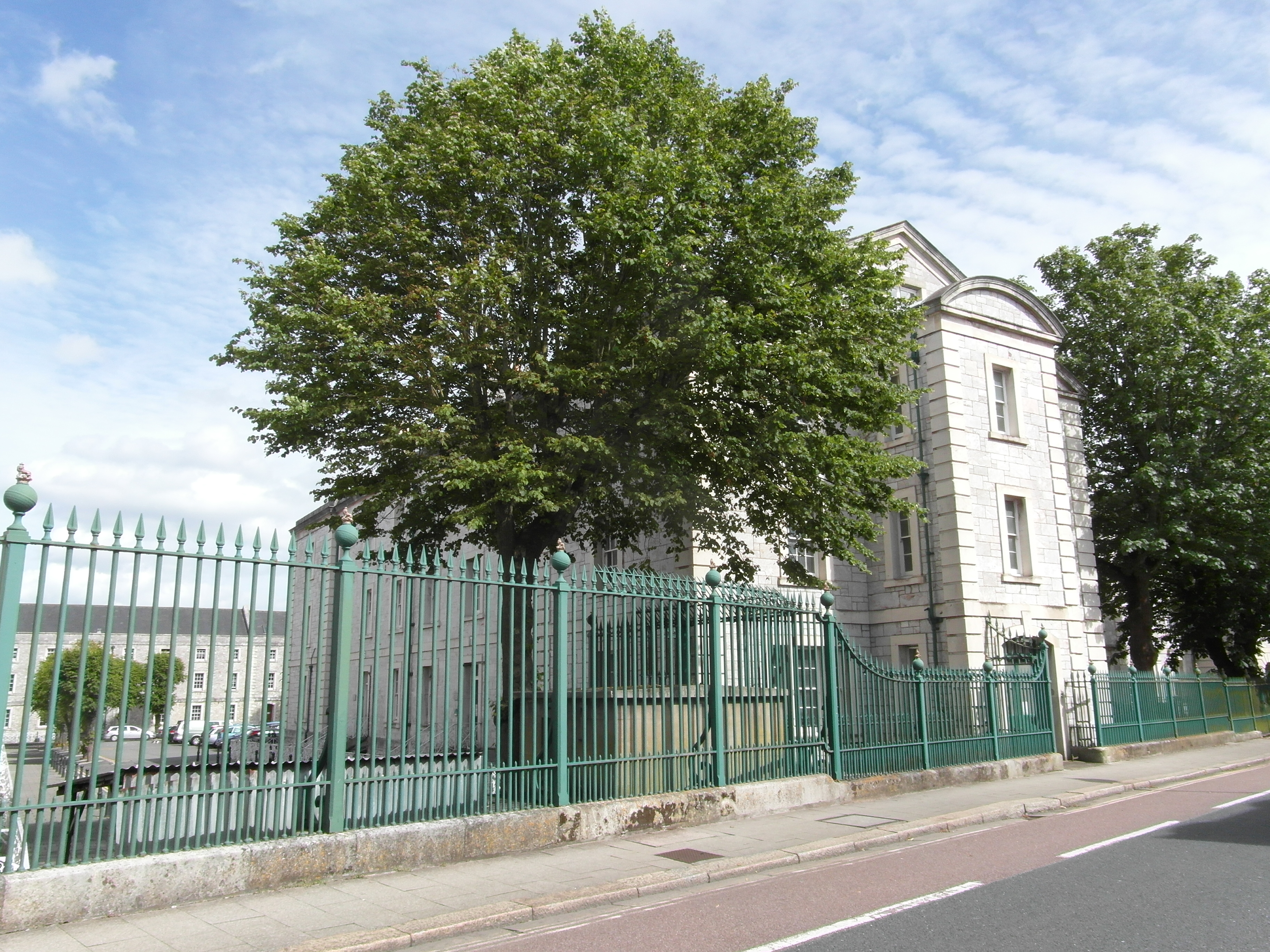
Block built as part of the new west front (1867–71) to house 24 subalterns. In the background part of the east barrack block (1783).

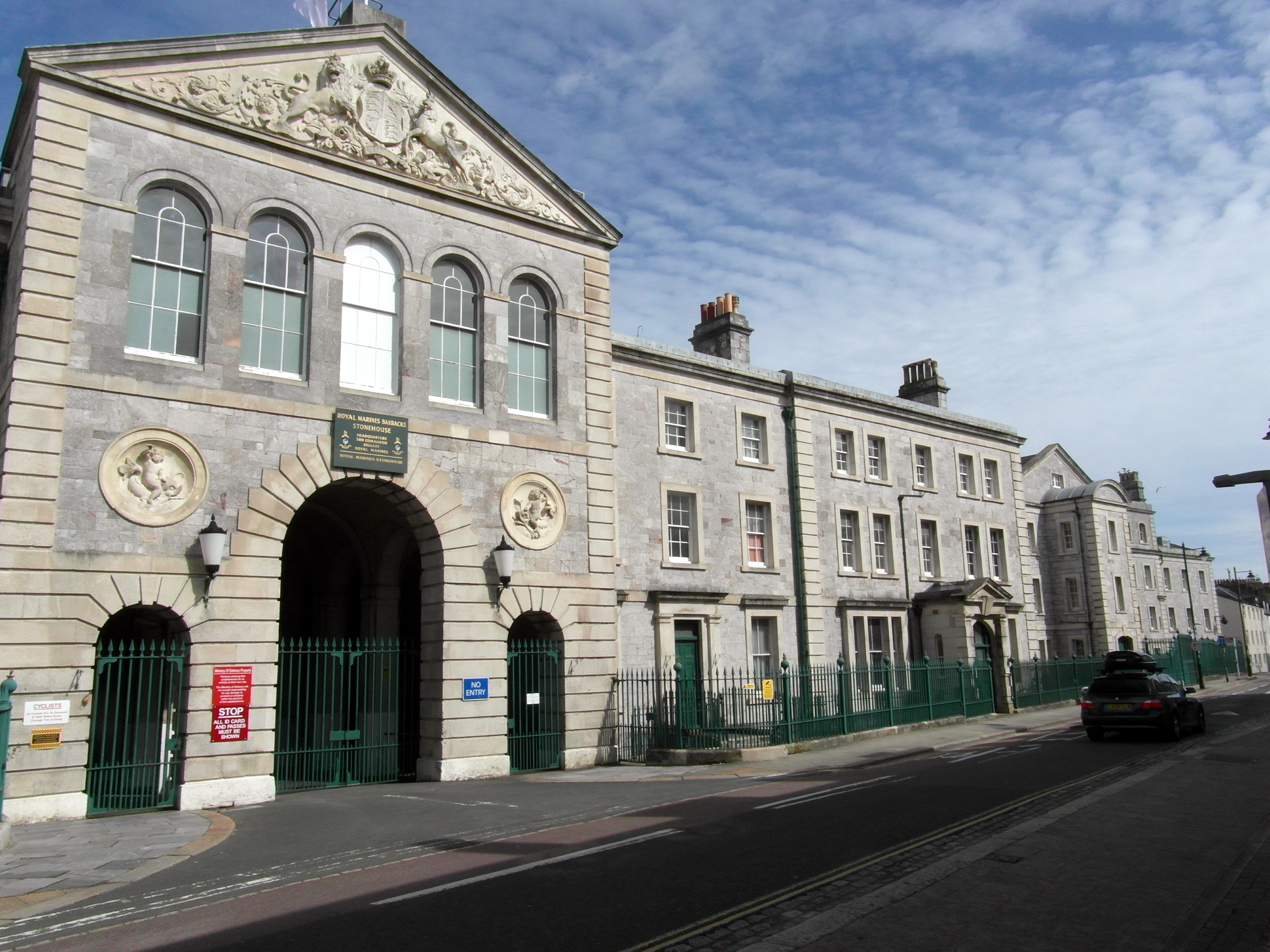
Part of the west front (1867–71) including main entrance and former houses for senior officers, now offices.
