= A Life on the Ocean Wave =

1838 song by Epes Sargent

"A Life on the Ocean Wave" is a poem-turned-song by Epes Sargent published in 1838 and set to music by Henry Russell. It is the iconic Regimental March of His Majesty's Royal Marines.

== Origin of the poem and song ==
One day Sargent was walking on The Battery in New York City watching the ships enter the harbour. This scene inspired Sargent to write a poem, which Russell later put to music. The song soon became popular in both the United Kingdom and the United States.

== Lyrics ==
A life on the ocean wave!
A home on the rolling deep!
Where the scatter'd waters rave, and the winds their revels keep;
Like an eagle cag'd I pine,
On this dull, unchanging shore;
Oh give me the flashing brine,
The spray and the tempest's roar.

(Chorus)
A life on the ocean wave,
A home on the rolling deep,
Where the scattered waters rave, and the winds their revels keep,
The winds, the winds, the winds their revels keep,
(the winds, the winds, the winds their revels keep).

Once more on the deck I stand,
Of my own swift gliding craft,
Set sail! and farewell to the land,
The gale follows fair abaft!
We shoot thro' the sparkling foam,
Like an ocean bird set free;
Like the ocean bird, our home
We'll find far out on the sea.

(Chorus)
A life on the ocean wave,
A home on the rolling deep,
Where the scattered waters rave, and the winds their revels keep,
The winds, the winds, the winds their revels keep,
(the winds, the winds, the winds their revels keep).

The land is no longer in view,
The clouds have begun to frown;
But with a stout vessel and crew,
We'll say, let the storm come down.
And the song of our hearts shall be,
While the wind and the water rave.
A life on the heaving sea,
A home on the bounding wave.

(Chorus)
A life on the ocean wave,
A home on the rolling deep,
Where the scattered waters rave, and the winds their revels keep,
The winds, the winds, the winds their revels keep,
(the winds, the winds, the winds their revels keep).

== Historical usage ==
- At an 1851 celebration in Salem, Massachusetts, the Boston Cadet Band gave the new clipper ship Witch of the Wave a lively sendoff by striking up "A Life on the Ocean Wave" as the SS R. B. Forbes towed the new clipper out to set sail for Boston.
- In 1882, the Deputy Adjutant General of the Royal Marines requested that the Bandmaster of each Royal Marine Division (Portsmouth, Plymouth, Chatham) submit an arrangement for a new regimental march for the Corps, if possible based on a naval song. Jacob Kappey, the Bandmaster of the Chatham Division, submitted an arrangement of "A Life on the Ocean Wave", with an eight bar trio from "The Sea" by Sigismund Neukomm, which was authorised for use as the regimental quick march of the Corps of Royal Marines in 1882.
- The tune, slightly altered, provides the music for the 1905 Latter-day Saint hymn "Who's On The Lord's Side?"
- They use the song from the 1945 Disney short film No Sail.
- In the United States, it is the official march of the U.S. Merchant Marine Academy.
- The tune is traditionally performed by the United States Merchant Marine Academy Regimental Band during presidential inauguration parades.
- In Portugal, it was adopted as the theme of the Armed Forces Movement (MFA) that overthrew the Estado Novo dictatorship on 25 April 1974.
- The tune, played by the Band of the Royal Marines, is played over the opening credits of the 1992 BBC television film An Ungentlemanly Act, about the first days of the invasion of the Falkland Islands in 1982.
