= List of equipment of the Royal Marines =

This is a list of equipment of the Royal Marines currently in use. It includes personal equipment, small arms, combat vehicles, snowmobiles and watercraft. The Royal Marines are a highly specialised and adaptable light infantry force, a part of His Majesty's Naval Service. The equipment of the Royal Marines has a high degree of commonality with other arms of the British Armed Forces – particularly the British Army – but includes some unique items.

To meet their commitments, the equipment of the armed forces is periodically updated and modified. Programs exist to ensure the Royal Marines are suitably equipped for both current conflicts and expected future conflicts, with any shortcomings in equipment addressed as Urgent Operational Requirements (UOR), which supplements planned equipment programmes.

== Infantry equipment ==
=== Personal equipment ===
==== Helmet ====
The Royal Marines now use the Ops-Core Future Assault Shell Technology Helmet, also known as the FAST helmet, as part of the Future Commando Force programme. The Revision Batlskin Cobra Plus helmet, which formed the helmet component of the earlier Virtus programme, remains in limited use.

==== Combat body armour ====
As part of the Future Commando Force programme, the standard issue combat body armor / plate carrier is the C2R CBAV (Commando Ballistic Armour Vest) Plate Carrier, which forms the core of the Commando Modular Assault System. The Scalable Tactical Vest component of the earlier Virtus programme remains in limited use.

==== Respirator ====
The General Service Respirator replaces the older S10 respirator. These respirators are also used by the rest of the Naval Service, the British Army and Royal Air Force.

==== Uniforms ====
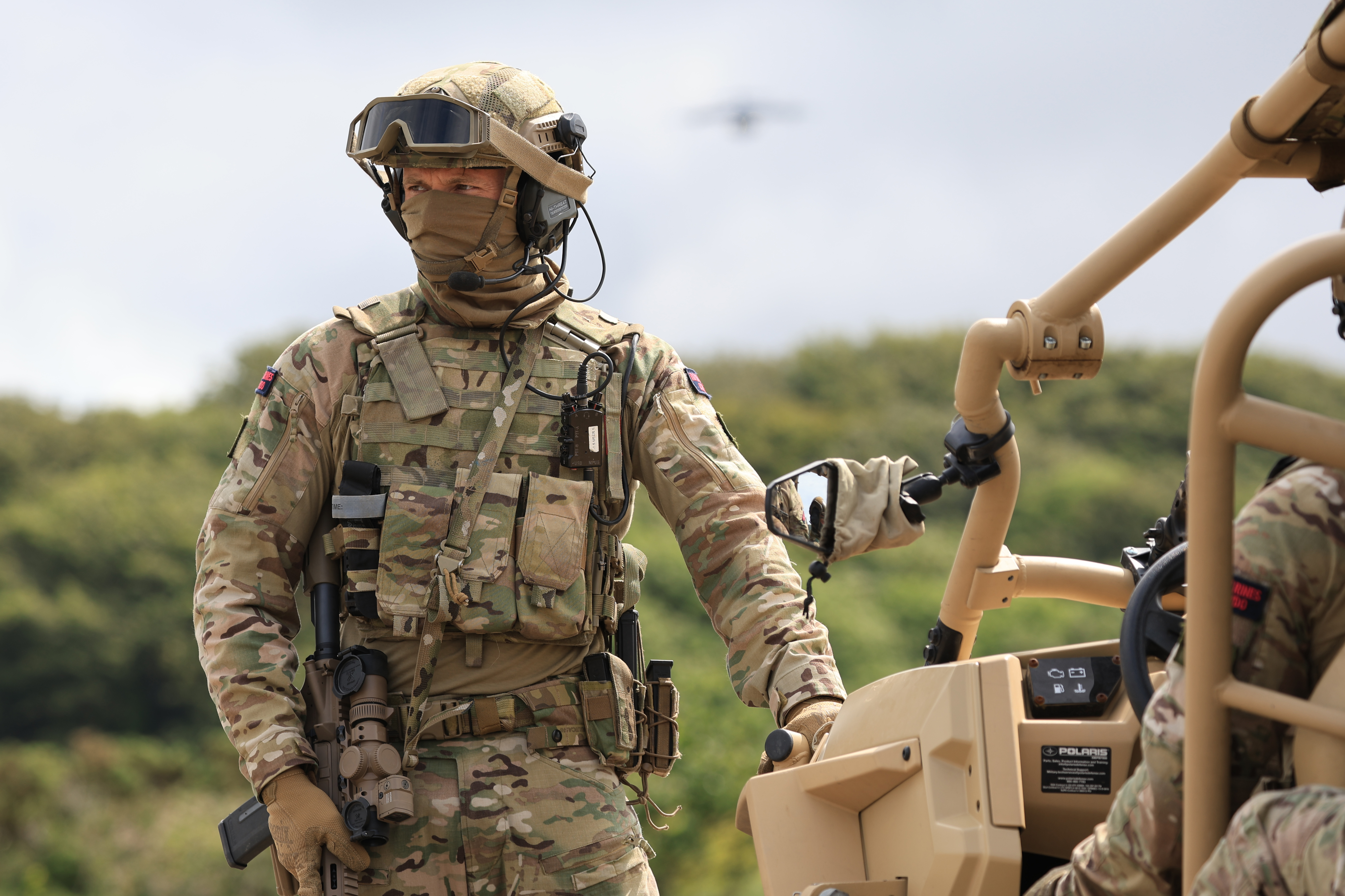
Royal Marine at Lulworth Range in July 2023 with Crye uniform and Ops-Core helmet; he also wears the Virtus programme's Scalable Tactical Vest.

As part of the Future Commando Force programme, the standard issue uniform since autumn 2020 has been an off-the-shelf design from Crye Precision featuring the company's MultiCam camouflage pattern. The Crye uniform is lighter weight, has higher tear-strength, is faster-drying, and is more breathable than typical cotton-nylon uniforms. It replaces the previously used Multi-Terrain Pattern Personal Clothing System uniform, which is still in use by the rest of the British Armed Forces.

=== Weapons ===
Name	Origin	Type	Cartridge	Image	Details
L119A1, L119A2	Canada	Assault rifle	5.56×45 mm		Colt C8. Initially used by 43 Commando, before being declared as the replacement for the SA80 family of weapons in all Royal Marines units. Both A1 and A2 variants are used.
L403A1	United States	Assault rifle	5.56×45mm		Knight's Stoner 1 (KS-1) variant of the ambidextrous Knight's Armament Company SR-16 fitted with a muzzle signature reduction system (suppressor) and a magnified optic. It is chambered in 5.56x45mm, and weighs 3.1 kg. Handguard allows mounting of enablers such as torches and laser aiming devices. An initial order of 1,620 systems has been placed, with an option to procure up to 10,000 systems over the next decade. Following the adoption of the SIG MCX for 42 and 47 Commando, the KS-1 is now mostly used by 40 and 45 Commando as well as the Surveillance and Reconnaissance Squadron.
L143A2	United States	Assault rifle	5.56×45 mm, .300 AAC Blackout		Sig Sauer MCX More than 1,500 rifles have been purchased for use by Commando Force personnel operating in 42 Commando and 47 Commando (Raiding Group), for use on more specialist operations including counter-terrorism and, ship boarding. Both 5.56mm and .300 AAC Blackout ammunition is used, with colour-coded accessories being used to ensure that a given weapon uses its correct calibre (tan accessories for 5.56mm weapons and black accessories for .300 AAC Blackout weapons).
L85A2, L85A3	United Kingdom	Assault rifle	5.56×45 mm		Formerly the standard issue assault rifle, the SA80 is currently being phased out in favour of the L119 series and/or the L403A1 but remains in limited service. As of April 2025, there was no concrete timeline for the weapon to be completely phased out in Royal Marines service, though 2030 was mentioned as the intended out-of-service date. Can be fitted with SUSAT, ACOG, Elcan SpecterOS 4X or Thermal Viper 2 sights. The LLM-Vario Ray laser aiming module and the L123 Underslung Grenade Launcher (UGL) can also be attached.
L7A2	Belgium	General-purpose machine gun	7.62×51 mm		FN MAG (British version). The designated GPMG for sustained fire out to 1,800 m. The L7A2 GPMG is a 7.62mm x 51mm belt-fed machine gun which can be used as a light weapon and in a sustained fire (SF) role. In the SF role, mounted on a tripod and fitted with the C2 optical sight, it is fired by a two-man team who are grouped in a specialist Machine Gun Troop to provide battalion-level fire support. In SF mode, the GPMG lays down 750 rounds-per-minute at ranges up to 1800 metres. The GPMG can be carried by a single marine and employed as a light machine gun (LMG). A fold-out bipod is used to support the GPMG in the LMG role.
L129A1, L129A2	United States	Designated marksman rifle	7.62×51 mm		The primary designated marksman rifle, known as the Sharpshooter, equipped with an ACOG optical sight for long-range engagements. There is also a Sniper Support Weapon (SSW) version fitted with a 12x Schmidt & Bender scope and a suppressor for use by the second man in each sniper team. An improved L129A2 version with a new Leupold scope, a HuxWrx suppressor, an Envision Technology ballistic calculator, and a Pixels-on-Target thermal sight is currently being adopted.
L115A3	United Kingdom	Precision rifle	8.6x70 mm		Now regarded as the primary precision rifle for all British military trained snipers. It is equipped with a 25x scope, a suppressor, a folding stock, a five-round .338 Lapua Magnum magazine and has an effective range in excess of 1,100 m (3,600 ft).
L131A1 (Glock 17), L137A1 (Glock 19)	Austria	Semi-automatic pistol	9×19 mm		Adopted as the new standard issue sidearm to replace the L9A1, L47A1, and SIG Sauer pistols, the L131A1 is a sidearm used for close combat with a magazine capacity of 17 rounds; where deemed appropriate, it is the primary weapon of personnel working in operational staff appointments and vehicle commanders and carried as a backup weapon by frontline personnel.
L3A1	United Kingdom	Bayonet			The blade is offset to the side of the handle to allow the rifle to be fired while the bayonet is fitted; it is shaped to produce good penetration when thrust and a ribbed section for rope cutting. The bayonet handle is shaped so as to allow the bayonet to be used as a multi-purpose knife when needed. The L3A1's scabbard features a saw blade for use on wood, a sharpening stone to hone the bayonet, and a bottle opener; when combined with the bayonet, it also forms a wire cutter. A rail-mounted adaptor was developed to allow the bayonet to be used with the L129A1 Sharpshooter Rifle.
L109A2	Switzerland	HE grenade	Fuse		British version of the Swiss HG 85 Grenade. It differs from the original in that it has a matte black safety clip similar to the American M67 grenade. It has a 3–5 second fuse (climate dependent), contains 155g of high explosive and has a lethal range of 10 m (33 ft).
NLAW	Sweden; United Kingdom	Anti-tank weapon	150 mm		Man-portable, short range fire-and-forget anti-tank guided missile system designed for non-expert use. It is designed to "rapidly knock out any main battle tank in just one shot by striking it from above".
FGM-148 Javelin	United States	Anti-tank guided missile	127 mm		Man-portable medium range anti-tank missile system. It fires a high-explosive anti-tank (HEAT) warhead and can penetrate explosive reactive armour. Compared to the American original, the version in British service has a more effective sight system and a tripod for improved firing and observation.
Accuracy International AX50	United Kingdom	Long range rifle	12.7x99 mm		Long range standalone .50 BMG anti-material rifle that is based on and replaced the earlier AW50. Royal Marines snipers are trained to use the AX50 to shoot the engine blocks of fast moving boats from Wildcat helicopters to aid the Royal Navy in the prevention of drug smuggling.
L111A1	United States	Heavy machine gun	12.7x99 mm		The L111A1 is the British version of the American M2 Browning. It can be attached to both armoured and soft-skin vehicles, or a ground-mount tripod. The belt-fed HMG fires .50 BMG at a rate of 485-635 rounds-per-minute to a range up to 2000 meters.
L16A2	United Kingdom; Canada	Mortar	81 mm		The L16A2 81mm Mortar is an indirect fire weapon which is capable of providing accurate High Explosive, Smoke and Illuminating rounds out to a maximum range of 5,650m, at a rate of 15 rounds per minute. The modernised L16A2 features GPS and laser-range finding systems. The Viking Mortar Section of the Armoured Support Group transport and fire their mortars in BvS10 Viking vehicles. Otherwise, it is carried disassembled in three loads, (barrel, baseplate and bipod with sights, each approximately 11 kg), normally carried by a vehicle or helicopter, but can be carried by a marine on foot and assembled for firing from the ground.

== Watercraft ==
Name	Origin	Type	Number	Displacement	Image	Details
Landing Craft, Utility Mk 10	United Kingdom	Landing craft	9	240 tonnes (240 long tons; 260 short tons)		The LCU is the Royal Marines' largest landing craft, carried by the Bay-class landing ship. These vessels are capable of carrying 120 Royal Marines Commandos and operating independently with a range of 600 nautical miles.
Rigid (Inshore) Raiding Craft	United Kingdom	Raiding craft	50	2.25 tonnes (2.21 long tons; 2.48 short tons)	IRC	The MK III RRC has a top speed of 33 knots laden with a payload of eight troops plus two crew and up to 680 kg of equipment, making it ideal for beach assaults, river patrol and dive support and comes complete with four lifting points to allow for transportation by helicopter or larger vessels.
Offshore Raiding Craft	United Kingdom	Rigid-hulled inflatable boat	27 (troop carrying) + 8 (fire support)	5 tonnes (4.9 long tons; 5.5 short tons)	ORC	The ORC is designed for commando insertion/extraction, patrol, maritime interdiction and fire support missions, and can operate in two variants; the Troop Carrying version and the Fire Support Platform version. Swapping between these variants can be completed in 60 minutes.
MK 11 Shallow Water Combat Submersibles	United States	Submersible	3	4.5 tonnes (4.4 long tons; 5.0 short tons)		Manned submersible used primarily for covert or clandestine missions by the Special Boat Service (SBS). The system fits inside the CHALFONT dry deck shelter on the Astute-class submarines.
Landing Craft, Vehicle Personnel Mk 5b	United Kingdom	Landing craft	8	8.2 tonnes (8.1 long tons; 9.0 short tons)		It will be replaced by the new Commando Insertion Craft (CIC) by 2027.
Island-class patrol boat	United Kingdom	Patrol boat	3	20 tonnes (20 long tons; 22 short tons)	Patrol boat	Three Island-class patrol boats (Mull, Rona, Eorsa) are used for force protection duties by 43 Commando Fleet Protection Group at HM Naval Base Clyde.
Inflatable Raiding Craft	United Kingdom	Inflatable boat		1.25 tonnes (1.23 long tons; 1.38 short tons)	IRC	Small raiding craft primarily used for over-the-horizon clandestine insertions of small teams of Royal Marines or SBS commandos.
BAE Fast Interceptor Craft	United Kingdom	Stealth boat	At least 2			The Fast Interceptor Craft is a stealth boat used by the Special Boat Service, for the role of insertion and interception. It has a rumoured top speed of at least 60 knots and has a low radar and thermal signature.

== Vehicles ==
The Royal Marines maintain no heavy armoured units, instead, they operate a fleet of lightly armoured and highly mobile vehicles intended for amphibious landings or rapid deployment. The primary armoured fighting vehicle operated by the RM Armoured Support Group (RMASG) is the BvS 10 Viking amphibious armoured all-terrain vehicle. Other, lighter vehicles include the Land Rover Wolf, the Jackal 2(MWMIK), and the Polaris MRZR.

Name	Origin	Type	Image	Details
Viking	Sweden	Amphibious armoured fighting vehicle		The RM currently operates 99 in four variants of the vehicle: The Troop Carrying Variant (TCV) capable of carrying 2 crew plus 10 passengers; the Command Variant (CV), which carries 2 crew plus up to 8 passengers with the rear cab being designed as an enhanced digital communications platform, the Repair and Recovery Variant (RRV), carrying 4 specialist maintenance vehicle mechanic crewmen and the Ambulance Variant (AV). The rear cab of the RRV carries a HIAB crane, a fully mobile workshop, an air compressor and a 9 tonne capacity capstan winch, together with hydraulic anchors. All variants are fully air-portable under a CH-47 Chinook helicopter, and are also fully amphibious; being capable of swimming in varying sea-states with a full load of passengers and stores. Will be replaced by the Future All-Terrain Vehicles (FATV) as part of the Collaborative All-Vehicle (CATV) programme, starting from February 2025.
Jackal 2 & Coyote	United Kingdom	Protected mobility vehicle		The primary roles of these vehicles in the Royal Marines are deep battlespace reconnaissance, rapid assault, patrol and fire support – roles where mobility, endurance and manoeuvrability are important. The Coyote 6×6 Tactical Support Vehicle (TSV) is a larger derivative of the Jackal, which acts in support of the Jackal 2 4×4 and allows transportation of supplies and equipment over similar terrain (up to 1.5t).
Land Rover Wolf	United Kingdom	Utility vehicle		The Land Rover Wolf is a militarised version of the Land Rover Defender. They can be found in service with British forces worldwide, and can be armed with one 12.7mm Heavy Machine Gun and a 7.62mm General Purpose Machine Gun. The Land Rover Wolf is designated as a Truck Utility Light (TUL – Defender 90) and Medium (TUM – Defender 110).
Polaris MRZR 4	United States	Utility vehicle		The Polaris MRZR-D4 is an ultralight 4x4 off-roader that can carry up to four marines and reach speeds of 60 mph for rapid movement across the battlefield. It is ideally equipped for the Future Commando Force programme. The turbocharged diesel vehicle can be used to carry supplies and equipment – like ammunition, water and fuel – for commando missions, but can also be fitted with machine guns and grenade launchers for added firepower. It can be used for quick attacks and withdrawals, but also for logistical resupply and casualty evacuation. The MRZR can be stored in the interior of Chinook helicopters, meaning that marines riding the vehicle can be quickly deployed to the mission area.
Hippo BRV	United Kingdom/ Germany	Armoured recovery vehicle	BARV	The Hippo is a conversion by Alvis Moelv, now BAE Systems, of a Leopard 1A5 tank. The turret has been replaced with a raised superstructure which resembles the bridge of a small ship. The original 830-horsepower (620 kW) diesel engine has been retained but the gearing of the transmission lowered; reducing the vehicle's road speed from 65 to 20 kilometres per hour (40 to 12 mph), but increasing its tractive force to 250 kilonewtons (56,000 lbf). Other modifications include the addition of working platforms, a nosing block, raised air intakes and an auxiliary power unit. The Hippo has a fording depth of 2.95 metres (9 ft 8 in) and can pull vehicles up to 50 tonnes weight or push a 240 tonne displacement landing craft off the beach. Four vehicles are in service, primarily deployed on the landing platform docks HMS Albion and HMS Bulwark.
Lynx Brutal	Finland	Snowmobile		159 Lynx Brutal Over Snow Reconnaissance Vehicles (OSRV) delivered in 2025 for use by the Surveillance and Reconnaissance Squadron (SRS). The squadron comprises highly-trained Mountain Leaders – experts in reconnaissance, mountain and arctic warfare. They are trained to use these snowmobiles (known as ski-doos) to gather valuable information on the terrain, the enemy and suitable beach landing places for larger amphibious forces to come ashore.
Malloy Aeronautics T150	United Kingdom	Unmanned aerial vehicle		22 quad-copters acquired in 2024. The T150 is capable of carrying payloads weighing 68 kg from distances of up to 70 km and is used to replenish commandos on the ground by flying from ship to shore with ammo, food and supplies.

== Future equipment ==
- The Royal Navy plans to retire the LCVP Mk5 in 2027 and replace it with the new Commando Insertion Craft (CIC). A competition for CIC design, manufacture and support is expected to commence at the end of 2024. The Commando Force programme director, said that top-level requirements called for a vessel “that can carry a strike team and a small vehicle in from 150 miles, at 25 knots plus and with a low (thermal, radar, visual, acoustic) signature".
- Under the international Collaborative All-Terrain Vehicle (CATV) programme, the UK Commando Force will receive 60 Future All-Terrain Vehicles (FATV) starting from February 2025.The FATVs will be in-service until 2058, replacing the BV206 tracked and older BvS 10 ‘Viking’ models. Their articulated mobility systems provide optimal manoeuvrability across varying terrains so they can traverse snow, ice, rock, sand, mud or swamps, as well as steep mountain environments. The vehicles’ amphibious feature also allows them to swim in flooded areas or coastal waters, and a logistics variant can carry 6 tonnes of equipment.

== See also ==
- List of equipment of the British Army
- List of equipment of the RAF Regiment
