= List of active Royal Marines military watercraft =

List of active Royal Marines military watercraft is a list of landing craft and other watercraft in service with the Royal Marines. It consists of a varied fleet of landing craft, patrol vessels and special forces watercraft (I.e. mini submarines etc.) maintained by the Royal Navy and designed to transport the Royal Marines or special forces from ship to shore as well as conduct river or estuary patrols.

== Landing Craft ==
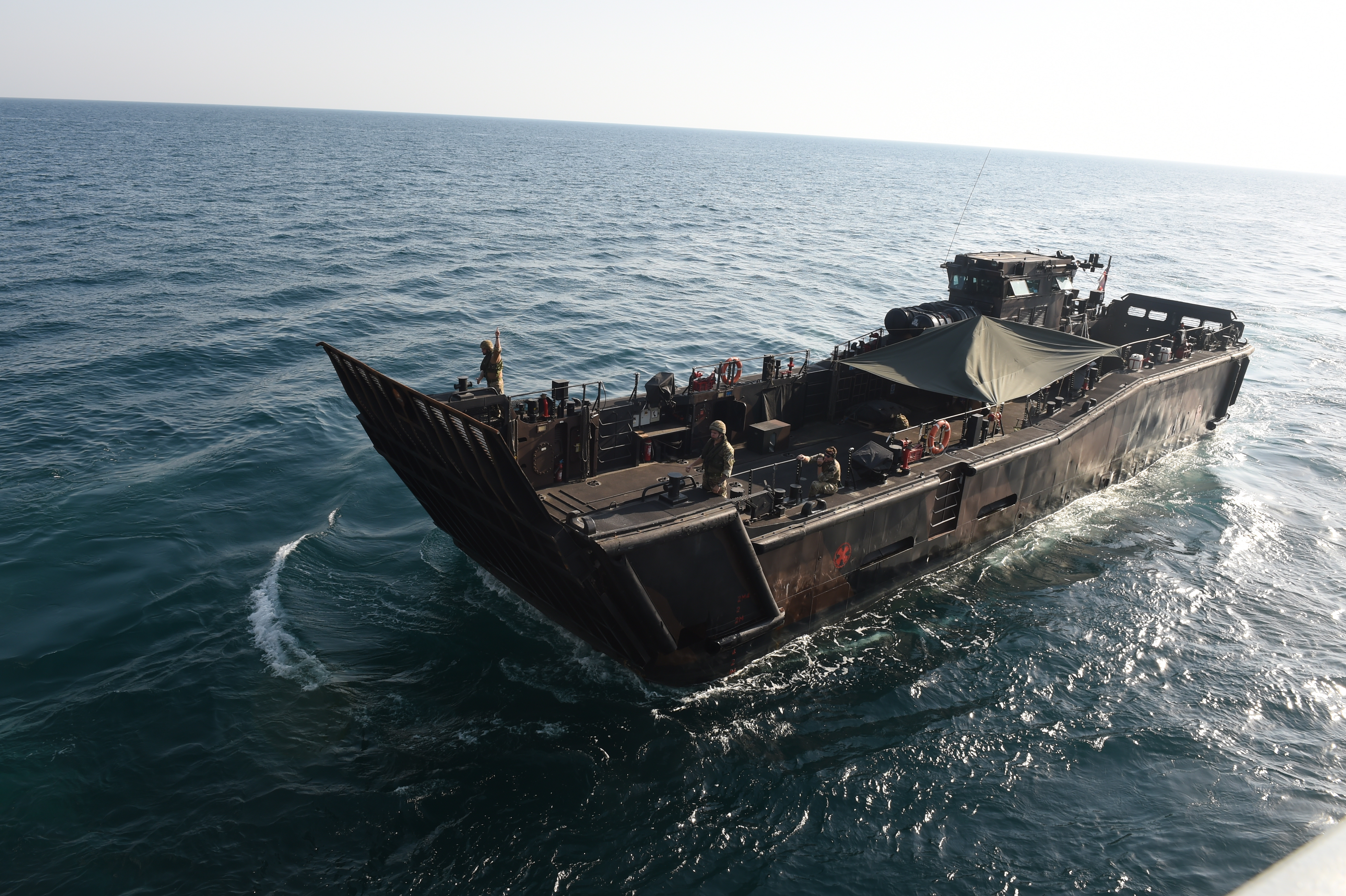
Royal Marines Landing Craft Utility (LCU) Mk10.

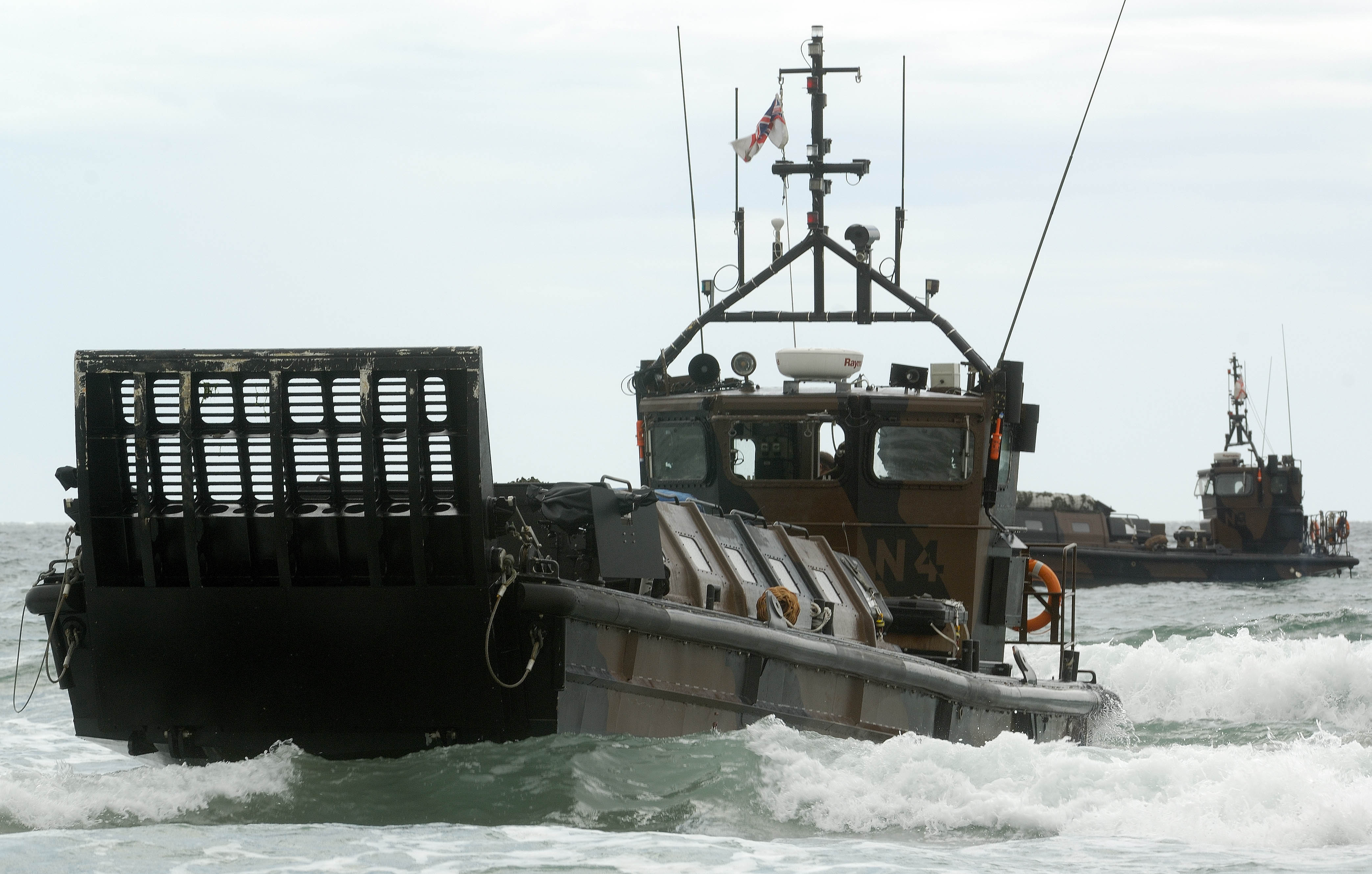
Royal Marines Landing Craft Vehicle Personnel (LCVP) Mk5.

The principal landing craft of the Royal Marines are the Mk 10 LCUs and the Mk 5B LCVPs. One LCU or two LCVPs can be carried on each of the Royal Fleet Auxiliary's Bay-class landing ships.

As of 2023, there were 9 Mk 10 LCUs and 8 Mk 5B LCVPs reported to be in service with the Royal Marines. The LCUs had a displacement of 240 tonnes and were capable of carrying a main battle tank, four other vehicles or 120 troops. The LCVPs displaced 8.2 tonnes and could carry 6 tonnes of stores or 35 troops.

With the 2025 retirement of the Royal Navy's former Albion-class landing platform docks, the LCUs are without a fully capable vessel on which they can be embarked given the much more limited capacity of the Bay-class ships. This may shift the emphasis of future Royal Marine capabilities to smaller insertion craft such as the LCVPs and the Commando Raiding Craft (CRC). In 2023 it was reported that the Royal Navy and Marines were seeking a replacement for the LCVP Mk 5 with the objective of securing service entry by 2027. The new Commando Insertion Craft were to have a low signature and be able to carry a strike team and small vehicle over a distance of 150 miles at a speed of 25 knots. A production contract had been envisaged by 2025, though this was delayed.

In June 2026, the Government announced that new high-speed "Joint Commando Craft" were to be acquired for the Royal Marines, in conjunction with Norway, together with "drone and autonomous technology". However, the precise timing of the acquisition remained unclear. These vessels are envisaged as likely operating from the future joint-Anglo-Dutch ATS-class amphibious warfare ship (projected to enter service in the 2030s), though precise operating concepts had yet to be defined.

Four Griffon 2400 TD Landing Craft Air Cushion (Light) were in service with the Royal Marines prior to 2021. These craft were capable of a 34-knot speed and could carry 16 troops or 2.4 tonnes of supplies. However, they were reported decommissioned as of 2021. In 2025, it was reported that three of the craft had been transferred to the Pakistan Navy.

== Commando Raiding Craft ==
The Commando Raiding Craft (CRC) is a recent upgrade from the previous Offshore Raiding Craft (ORC) operated by the Royal Marines. The CRC is primarily employed for 'Strategic Raiding' where speed and covertness is desired, however, the Commando Raiding Craft is equally as capable when conducting amphibious operations alongside the larger and more traditional LCACs, LCUs and LCVPs. The CRC is fitted with three general purpose machine guns or .50 heavy machine gun mounts as well as protection against enemy fire for the troops inside. The CRC has a speed of up to 40 knots, a range of 200 nautical miles and can be underslung from a helicopter or deployed from ships of various sizes. As of 2024, it is reportedly employed with 539 Raiding Squadron RM.

35 ORC were originally reported to be in service with the Royal Marines. However, 23 of these were reportedly donated to Ukraine. The CRC, which began entering service in 2023/24, incorporate both troop-carrying variants and fire-support variants, with the latter equipped with both machine gun mounts and 40mm grenade launchers.

== Raiding Craft ==
The Raiding Craft (RC) are operated in large numbers by the Royal Marines and can be divided into two groups; The Rigid Raider (RRC), and the smaller Inflatable Raiding Craft (IRC). Despite being the smallest of the amphibious craft, the Raiding Craft are the most widely used due to their mobility and versatility. As such, the RCs often find themselves deployed in amphibious and riverine operations around the globe, in environments ranging from the Arctic to the tropics. Examples of these craft are not only embarked on all amphibious warfare vessels, but are also carried aboard other Royal Navy ships for use on patrol duties, such as searching ships or anti-piracy.

== Specialist Craft ==
The Royal Navy operate three MK 11 Shallow Water Combat Submersibles (SWCS) for use by the Special Boat Service. They are designed to deliver special forces personnel and their equipment for covert special operations missions on hostile shores. They replace the previously used SDV Mk8 Mod 1, which was the same as used by the United States Navy SEALs.

From 2011 to 2013, the Royal Marines leased four CB90-class fast assault craft from the Swedish Armed Forces to gain operational insight into the design and capabilities of such a craft. The CB90 or a similar vessel may in future fulfil the Royal Marines concept of the 'Future Force Protection Craft'. It is intended that such a vessel would provide a Task Group in the littoral zones protection from hostile fast attack craft.

The Fast Interceptor Craft (FIC) is in use with the Special Boat Service. It has a reported maximum speed of up to 55 knots and its hull features a highly stealthy design and advanced 'wave piercing' qualities. It is similar to the American Mark V Special Operations Craft.

== Patrol Boats ==
The Royal Marines operate three dedicated patrol vessels of the Island-class based at HMNB Clyde. They are tasked with protecting high value Royal Navy ships such as the Vanguard-class submarines. The vessels, called Mull, Rona and Eorsa, are ex-MoD Police boats. Mull and Rona were handed over to the Royal Marines during 2013, with Eorsa arriving at a later date.

== See also ==
Lists of ships operated by or in support of His Majesty's Naval Service

- List of active Royal Navy ships
- List of active Royal Fleet Auxiliary ships
- List of ships of Serco Marine Services
