= MV St Faith =

Isle of Wight car and passenger ferry

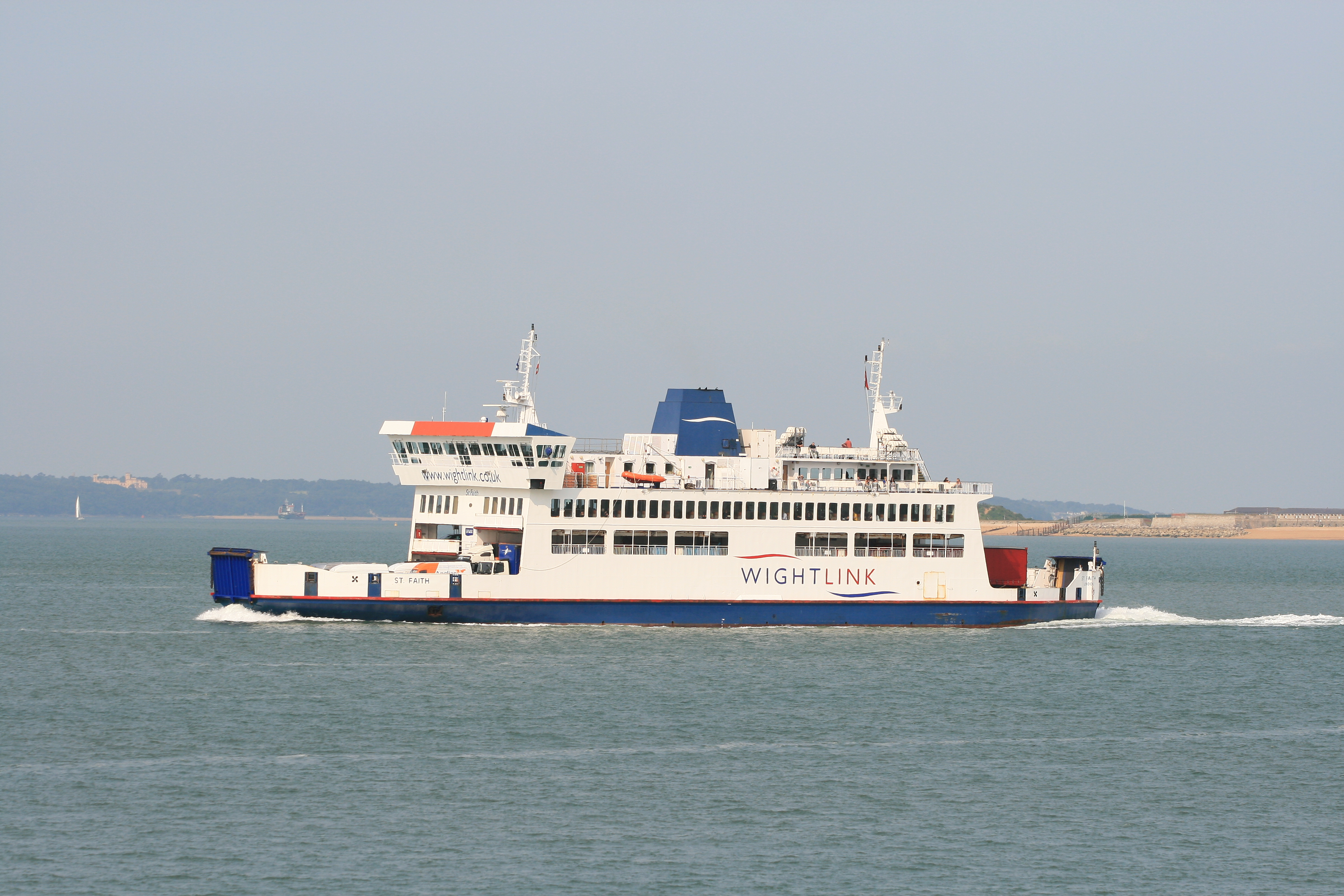
- St Faith outbound from Portsmouth Harbour 27 June 2013.

History

United Kingdom
- Name: MV St Faith
- Operator: Wightlink
- Port of registry: London
- Builder: Cochrane Shipbuilders Ltd, Selby
- Launched: 28 February 1990
- In service: 1990
- Identification: IMO number: 8907228; MMSI number: 235031618; Callsign: MMDA5
- Status: In service

General characteristics
- Class & type: Car Passenger Ferry
- Tonnage: 3,009 GT
- Length: 77.05 metres (252.8 ft)
- Beam: 17.2 metres (56 ft)
- Draught: 2.48 metres (8 ft 2 in)
- Installed power: 3x 850bhp 6-cyl MAN 6ASL25 diesel engines
- Propulsion: 3x Voith Schneider cycloidal propellers
- Speed: 12.5 knots (23.2 km/h; 14.4 mph)
- Capacity: 722 passengers; 142 cars; 12 lorries
- Crew: 10-12

MV St Faith is a vehicle and passenger ferry operated by Wightlink on its route from Portsmouth to Fishbourne on the Isle of Wight. As with former sister ship St Cecilia, there were plans to increase St Faith's capacity by extending her length by 12 metres (39 ft). Entering service in 1990, the ferry's name is taken from St Faith's Church, Cowes.

== Incidents ==
=== 2010 dock collision ===
On arrival in Portsmouth on 28 May 2010, St Faith collided heavily with the dock, injuring two passengers and causing minor damage. The vessel was temporarily withdrawn from service.

=== 2015 breakdown ===
On 28 February 2015 the St Faith suffered an engine failure in the middle of the Solent around 20 minutes into the 8 am crossing to the Isle of Wight. The captain decided to return to Portsmouth, and tug SD Bountiful towed the ferry back to the Gunwharf Quays terminal. The crew switched to St Helen to continue the service. After repairs, St Faith returned to service on 13 March 2015.

=== 2017 fire ===
On 19 January 2017 a fire broke out in a cigarette bin on the port side bridge wing of the ferry whilst mid-Solent. The fire was extinguished by crew and no casualties were reported. Two fire appliances from Ryde Fire Station were sent to the scene at Wightlink's Fishbourne ferry terminal along with the Isle of Wight Fire and Rescue Service's Incident Support Unit from East Cowes. Bembridge Coastguard Rescue Team, the Isle of Wight Ambulance Service and local police also attended the incident.
