= HMNS (disambiguation) =

HMNS refers to His Majesty's Naval Service, the naval service of the United Kingdom.

HMNS may also refer to:

- Houston Museum of Natural Science, a natural history museum in Houston, Texas
- Hayashibara Museum of Natural Sciences, a museum in Okayama, Japan
