= Naval Service =

Naval Service may refer to either:

- His Majesty's Naval Service, Britain's Royal Navy plus additional services
- Naval Service (Ireland), a branch of the Irish Defence Forces
- United States Department of the Navy, United States military department encompassing the United States Navy and United States Marine Corps
- Vietnam People's Navy (alternatively Naval Service), the naval force of the former North Vietnam and now the Socialist Republic of Vietnam
