= Naval Careers Service =

Royal Navy Careers Service
- Active: 1 April 1963–Present
- Country: United Kingdom
- Role: Royal Navy Recruiting Organisation
- Part of: British Armed Forces
- Navy Command HQ: Whale Island, Portsmouth, UK

Commanders
- First Sea Lord: General Sir Gwyn Jenkins
- Director People and Training & Naval Secretary: Rear Admiral Jude Terry
- Head of Recruiting & Attraction Royal Navy: Captain Stephanie Pearmaine

Insignia
- White Ensign

The Naval Careers Service (NCS) is part of the Naval Service in the United Kingdom which includes the Royal Navy, Royal Marines and the Reserve Naval and Marine Forces. RNCS career advisors are responsible for the running of Armed Forces Careers Offices, providing career advice to potential recruits and managing their applications. When required, regular and reserve ranks and rates can be temporarily assigned to the service.

The Naval Careers Service processes applications to the Royal Navy (both Regular and Reserve), the Royal Marines and the Royal Fleet Auxiliary.

== Organisation ==
The Naval Careers Service (NCS) was formed on 1 April 1963 when the Naval Recruiting Service was renamed. It is one of the four components of His Majesty's Naval Service – alongside the Royal Navy, the Royal Marines and the Reserve Naval and Marine Forces – and is governed by the Admiralty Board of the Defence Council. The service is led by the Captain of Naval Recruiting, now known as Head of Recruiting and Attraction. The service's personnel consist of former Royal Navy, Royal Naval Reserve, Royal Marines and Royal Marines Reserve Warrant Officers, Senior Non-Commissioned Officers and Senior Rates. These personnel hold the named title of Careers Advisor in the NCS, of which there are three ranks – CA3, CA2, CA1 (in order of ascending seniority). Personnel wear the uniform conforming to the rank or rate they held in their regular service, with the addition of the NCS badge. Careers advisers are typically assigned to one of the 48 Armed Forces Careers Offices.

NCS members are subject to the King's Regulations, service law and the provisions of the Armed Forces Act 2006. Service members are classed as Full Time Reserve Service (FTRS) under the Reserve Forces Act 1996 and are subject to call-out (mobilisation) in addition to any liability they have as ex-regular service personnel (as recall reserve). RNCS members are also entitled to the Volunteer Reserves Service Medal.

The NCS is by far the smallest of the four components of the Naval Service: in September 2017 it amounted to 180 full-time trained personnel. The Royal Navy had a strength of around 22,500 regular personnel and the Royal Marines around 6,600. The combined Royal Navy and Royal Marine reserves amounted to around 2,700 personnel.

== Entry ==
Applicants are only accepted as direct entrants from the other components of the Naval Service. They must have 12 years service and have held the minimum rank of petty officer (or sergeant in the Royal Marines) for at least two years. Applications may be made whilst serving in the regular forces or within two years of leaving (extended to five years where applicants entered the reserve forces upon end of regular service). The maximum age on entry is 52 and the normal retirement age is 55, which may be extended in exceptional circumstances to 60 years. Additionally all entrants must pass a selection board and have a clean driving licence, no unspent convictions and pass medical fitness checks.

New entrants are always assigned to the CA3 rank, regardless of previous rank. Initial and further training is carried out at the Recruiting and Training Advisory Group (RTAG) in HMS Sultan. Progression is via promotion boards specific to the NCS.

Additionally regular and reserve officers and ratings can be temporarily assigned to the service. Such personnel are generally required to be over 30, present a good image and able to communicate with potential recruits and their parents. These personnel typically serve in an Armed Forces Careers Office, a Royal Navy Careers Information Office, an Officer Careers Liaison Centre or for university presentations and displays.

== Role ==
The role of NCS Career Advisors is to increase awareness of the Naval Service to potential recruits and the general public and to enable the service to meet recruitment targets. Career Advisors interview potential applicants, administer selection tests, check recruits meet eligibility requirements and assist them in completing necessary documentation and process requirements. They may also accompany potential recruits on visits to Royal Navy establishments, attend careers fairs and carry out presentations to schools and colleges and outreach events.
