= Island-class patrol vessel (2013) =

Class of police patrol boat

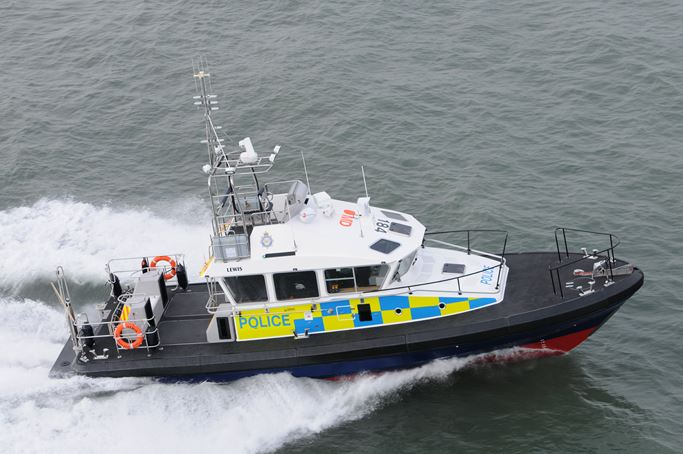
- Island-class Police patrol vessel

Class overview
- Builders: Holyhead Marine Services
- Operators: MoD Police Clyde Marine Unit (primary) . Portsmouth Marine Unit. Force Protection Group Royal Marines
- Preceded by: 14m police boat
- Succeeded by: new hull in design phase
- Subclasses: RM patrol craft
- Built: 294 miles at 33kts full load
- In commission: 12
- Planned: 12
- Completed: 12
- Active: 12

General characteristics
- Type: Police Patrol Boat
- Displacement: 19.9 tonnes
- Length: 14.90m (OA)
- Beam: 4.58m
- Draught: 0.90m (Full Load)
- Propulsion: Twin Caterpillar C18 @ 715bhp (533kW) coupled to Rolls-Royce FF37 Waterjets
- Speed: 33kts @ 19.9 tonnes
- Complement: 3
- Armament: Capable of carrying variety of weapons fit
- Armour: Ballistically protected

The Island-class is a class of Police patrol boat operated primarily by the MOD Police Clyde Marine Unit at HMNB Clyde. They are tasked with protecting high value Royal Navy ships such as the Vanguard-class submarines. Royal Marines currently operate two ex police boats of the class Mull and Rona- these were handed over to the Royal Marines during 2013. Rona and Mull are interchangeable in their roles and can be used by both RM and MDP. The RMs also have a third vessel named Eorsa. Mod Police Portsmouth Marine Unit also operate Gigha and Lewis. Gigha was the prototype and first of class.

== Specifications ==
The Island-class patrol vessel has the following specifications:

- Weight (full): 20,000 kg (20 tonnes)
- Length: 14.9 m (48 ft 11 in)
- Width : 4.6 m (15 ft 1 in)
- Speed: 33 kn (61 km/h; 38 mph)
- Endurance: In excess of 275 nautical miles (509 km)
- Crew: 3
- Armament: Weapon mounts for GPMGs, GMGs and HMGs

== Current fleet ==
MoD Police

- Gigha (Portsmouth Marine Unit)
- Iona
- Skye
- Lismore
- Barra
- Harris
- Lewis (Portsmouth Marine Unit)
- Jura
- Tiree

Royal Marines

- Mull
- Rona
- Eorsa

== See also ==
- MoD Police
- List of active Royal Marines military watercraft
