= Inflatable Raiding Craft =

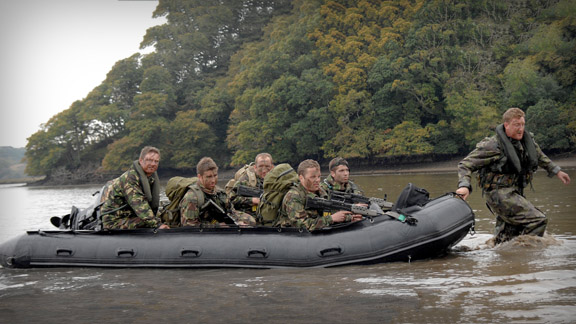
A Royal Marines' Inflatable Raiding Craft (IRC).

The Inflatable Raiding Craft (IRC) is a series of fast raiding and assault craft in service with the Royal Navy (incl. the Royal Marines and the Special Boat Service). Despite being among the smallest of the amphibious craft, the IRC is one of the most widely used due to its mobility and versatility. The IRC is essentially a type of inflatable boat, the American equivalent is the Combat Rubber Raiding Craft.

== Specifications ==
The Inflatable Raiding Craft has the following specifications:

- Weight (full): 1,250 kg (1.25 tonnes)
- Length: 5 m (16 ft 5 in)
- Width: 1.9 m (6 ft 3 in)
- Speed (full): 20 kn (37 km/h; 23 mph)
- Endurance: 2 hours
- Troops: 6 Royal Marines (1 driver, 5 fully equipped troops)

== See also ==
- List of active Royal Marines military watercraft
