= SD Bountiful =

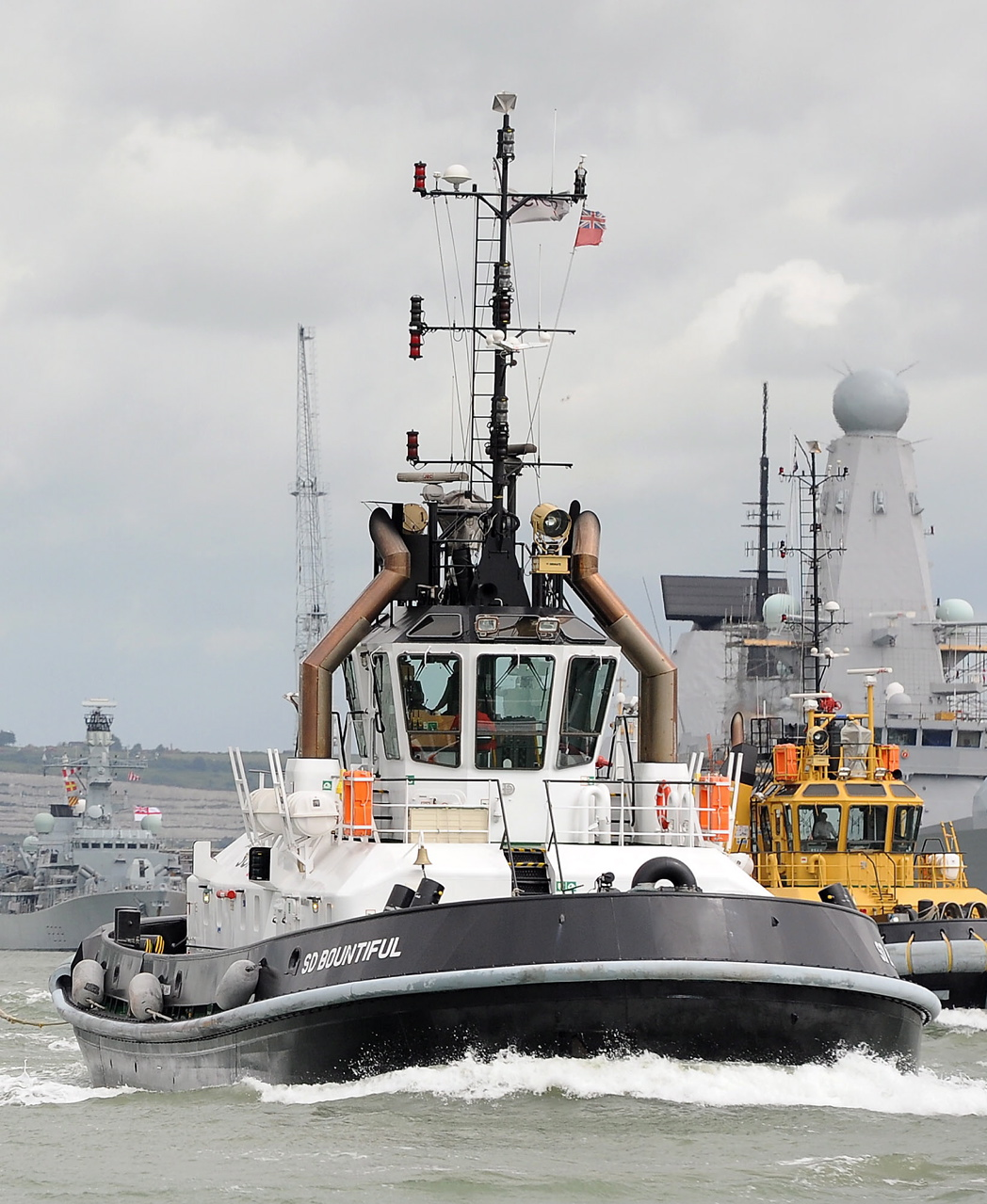
- SD Bountiful escorting HMS Iron Duke (F234) after a 16-month upgrade, June 2013

History

United Kingdom
- Name: SD Bountiful
- Builder: Damen, Stellendam
- In service: 2010
- Homeport: HMNB Portsmouth
- Identification: IMO number: 9533787; MMSI number: 235072757; Callsign: 2CHE8
- Status: Active

General characteristics
- Class & type: ATD 2909-class tug
- Tonnage: 271 GT
- Length: 29.14 m (95 ft 7 in)
- Beam: 9.98 m (32 ft 9 in)
- Draught: 4.8 m (15 ft 9 in)
- Speed: 13 kn (24 km/h; 15 mph)
- Complement: 5

SD Bountiful is an ATD 2909-class tug operated by Serco Marine Services in support of the United Kingdom's Naval Service.

== See also ==
- Naval Service (United Kingdom)
- List of ships of Serco Marine Services
