= His Majesty's Naval Service =

Maritime service of the British Armed Forces

- Naval Ensign of the United Kingdom and of the Royal Navy
- Country: United Kingdom (Note: Kingdom of England (until 1707); Kingdom of Scotland (until 1707); Kingdom of Great Britain (1707–1800); United Kingdom of Great Britain and Ireland (1801-1922); United Kingdom (since 1922))
- Type: Naval service
- Role: Naval and amphibious warfare
- Size: 31,906 active personnel; 3,217 reserve personnel (Note: Since April 2013, MoD publications no longer report the entire strength of the Regular Reserve, instead, only Regular Reserves serving under a fixed-term reserve contract are counted.); 2,478 other personnel
- Part of: British Armed Forces
- Garrison/HQ: Whitehall, London
- Branches: Royal Navy; Royal Marines; (United Kingdom) Maritime Reserve; Royal Fleet Auxiliary; (United Kingdom) Naval Careers Service

Commanders
- Head of the Armed Forces and Lord High Admiral: Charles III
- First Sea Lord and Chief of the Naval Staff: General Sir Gwyn Jenkins
- Second Sea Lord and Deputy Chief of the Naval Staff: Vice Admiral Paul Beattie
- Fleet Commander: Vice Admiral Steve Moorhouse

Insignia
- White Ensign (Note: 1630–1707 Middle Ages–1707 1707–1800 since 1801)

His Majesty's Naval Service, (Note: when the reigning monarch is female, it is known as Her Majesty's Naval Service) referred to colloquially as the Royal Navy, is the United Kingdom's naval warfare and maritime service. It consists of the Royal Navy, Royal Marines, Maritime Reserve, Royal Fleet Auxiliary, and Naval Careers Service. The Naval Service as a whole falls under the command of the Navy Board, which is headed by the First Sea Lord. This position is currently held by General Sir Gwyn Jenkins (appointed May 2025). The Defence Council delegates administration of the Naval Service to the Admiralty Board, chaired by the Secretary of State for Defence.

The Naval Service is dominated by the Royal Navy, and operates primarily from three bases in the United Kingdom where commissioned ships are based; Portsmouth, Clyde and Devonport, the last being the largest operational naval base in Western Europe. As of July 2026, there were more than 85 vessels in service with the various branches of the Naval Service, plus more than 90 additional vessels operated by the supporting Serco Marine Services. These vessels included: 60 commissioned and active ships of the Royal Navy, 17 principal landing craft of the Royal Marines, 9 auxiliary ships of the Royal Fleet Auxiliary and 90+ supporting Marine Services vessels. Additional vessels are under charter to the Ministry of Defence. As of 2022, HM Naval Service (Royal Navy, Royal Marines, Royal Fleet Auxiliary and Naval Careers Service) employed about 39,500 regular and reserve personnel.

In 2020, the First Sea Lord announced that the 'Naval Service' will informally be known as the 'Royal Navy'. The Royal Navy was made a colloquial name for the Naval Service as part of a transformation programme with the approval of the Navy Executive Committee to reflect the strength of the Royal Navy brand and assist with unifying the force.

The total displacement of the Royal Navy and the Royal Fleet Auxiliary is, as of July 2026, around 635,000 tonnes, while the combined displacement of Royal Marine landing craft is approximately an additional 2,200 tonnes.

== King's Regulations for the Royal Navy ==
=== Components as of 2017 ===
The 2017 Queen's Regulations for the Royal Navy stipulate that the Naval Service consists of:

- The Royal Navy (Royal Naval Reserve) - including Queen Alexandra's Royal Naval Nursing Service
- The Royal Marines (Royal Marines Reserve)
- Naval Careers Service

The Royal Fleet Auxiliary (RFA) operate a fleet of auxiliaries in support of the Royal Navy. RFA personnel are part of the Ministry of Defence civil service. Among the many contractors which support the Ministry of Defence and Royal Navy is Serco Marine Services, provided under a private finance initiative.

=== Former composition ===
The following services were formerly also components of the Naval Service:

- The Women's Royal Naval Service (merged into the Royal Navy in 1993)
- The Royal Naval Minewatching Service (reformed into the Royal Naval Auxiliary Service in 1962 and disbanded in 1994)
- The Queen Alexandra's Royal Naval Nursing Service (incorporated within the Royal Navy in 2000)

Naval Reserve Forces:

- The Royal Naval Volunteer Reserve (merged with the Royal Naval Reserve in 1958)
  - The Royal Naval Volunteer (Supplementary) Reserve
  - The Royal Naval Volunteer (Wireless) Reserve
  - The Royal Naval Volunteer (Postal) Reserve)
- The Royal Naval Emergency Reserve (disbanded c. 1959)
- The Royal Naval Special Reserve (disbanded c. 1960)
- The Women's Royal Naval Volunteer Reserve (renamed the Women's Royal Naval Reserve in 1958, merged into the Royal Naval Reserve in 1993)
  - The Women's Royal Naval Supplementary Reserve
- The Queen Alexandra's Royal Naval Nursing Service Reserve (incorporated within the Royal Naval Reserve in 2000)

Formerly the Royal Maritime Auxiliary Service (merged with the former Port Auxiliary Service in 1976), the Fleet Reserve, and the Royal Corps of Naval Constructors were also considered part of the Naval Service.

== Composition of the Naval Service ==
=== Royal Navy ===
Referred to as the "Senior Service" by virtue of it being the oldest service within the British Armed Forces, the Royal Navy is a technologically sophisticated naval force and forms the core structure of the Naval Service. Command of deployable assets is exercised by the Fleet Commander. The United Kingdom's nuclear deterrent is carried aboard the navy's Vanguard class of four nuclear ballistic-missile submarines. The surface fleet consists of aircraft carriers, destroyers, frigates, patrol ships, mine-countermeasures, and miscellaneous vessels. The submarine service has existed within the Royal Navy for more than 100 years. The service possessed a combined fleet of diesel-electric and nuclear-powered submarines until the early 1990s. Following the Options for Change defence review, the Upholder-class diesel-electric submarines were withdrawn and the attack submarine flotilla is now exclusively nuclear-powered.

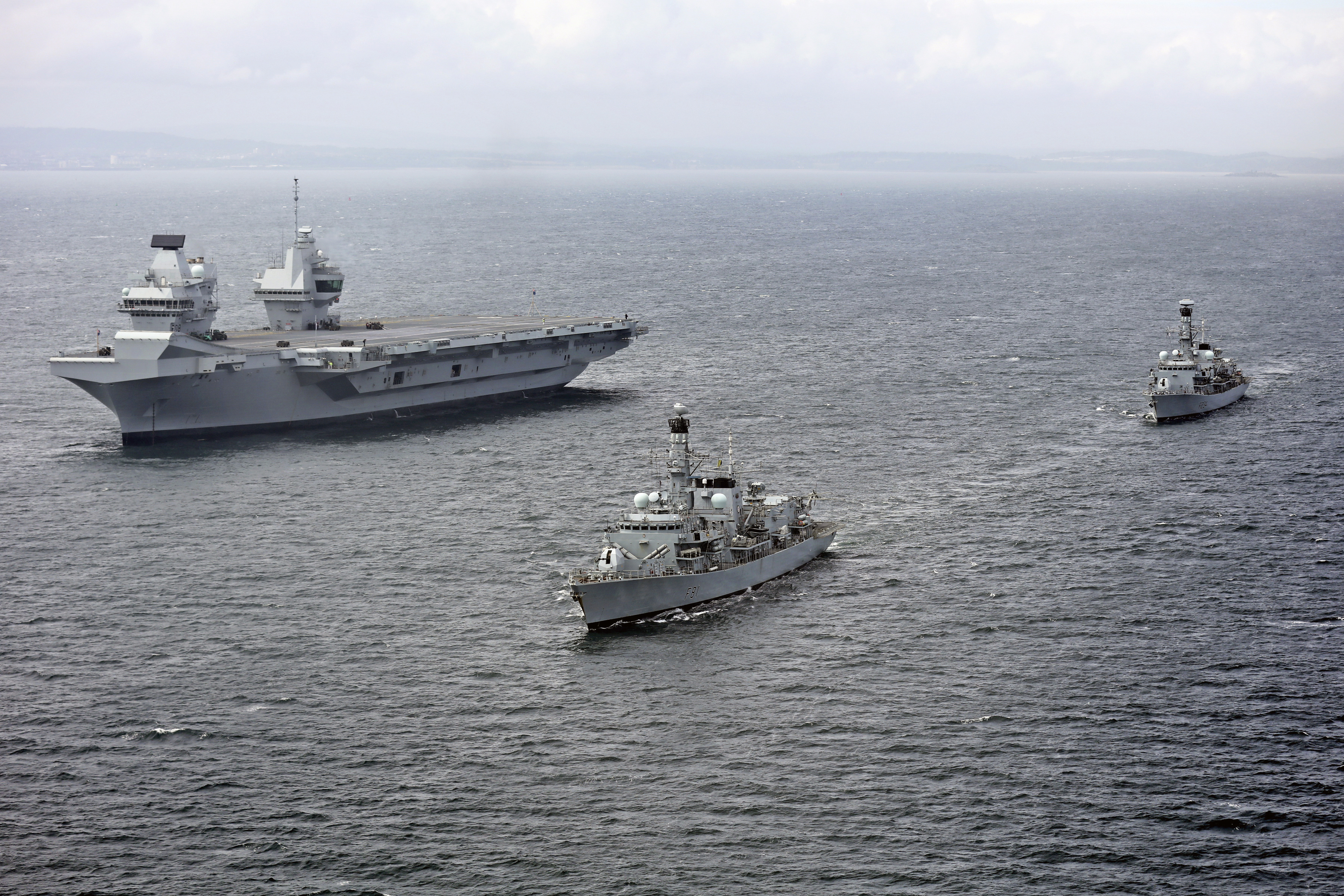
HMS Queen Elizabeth on sea trials in June 2017

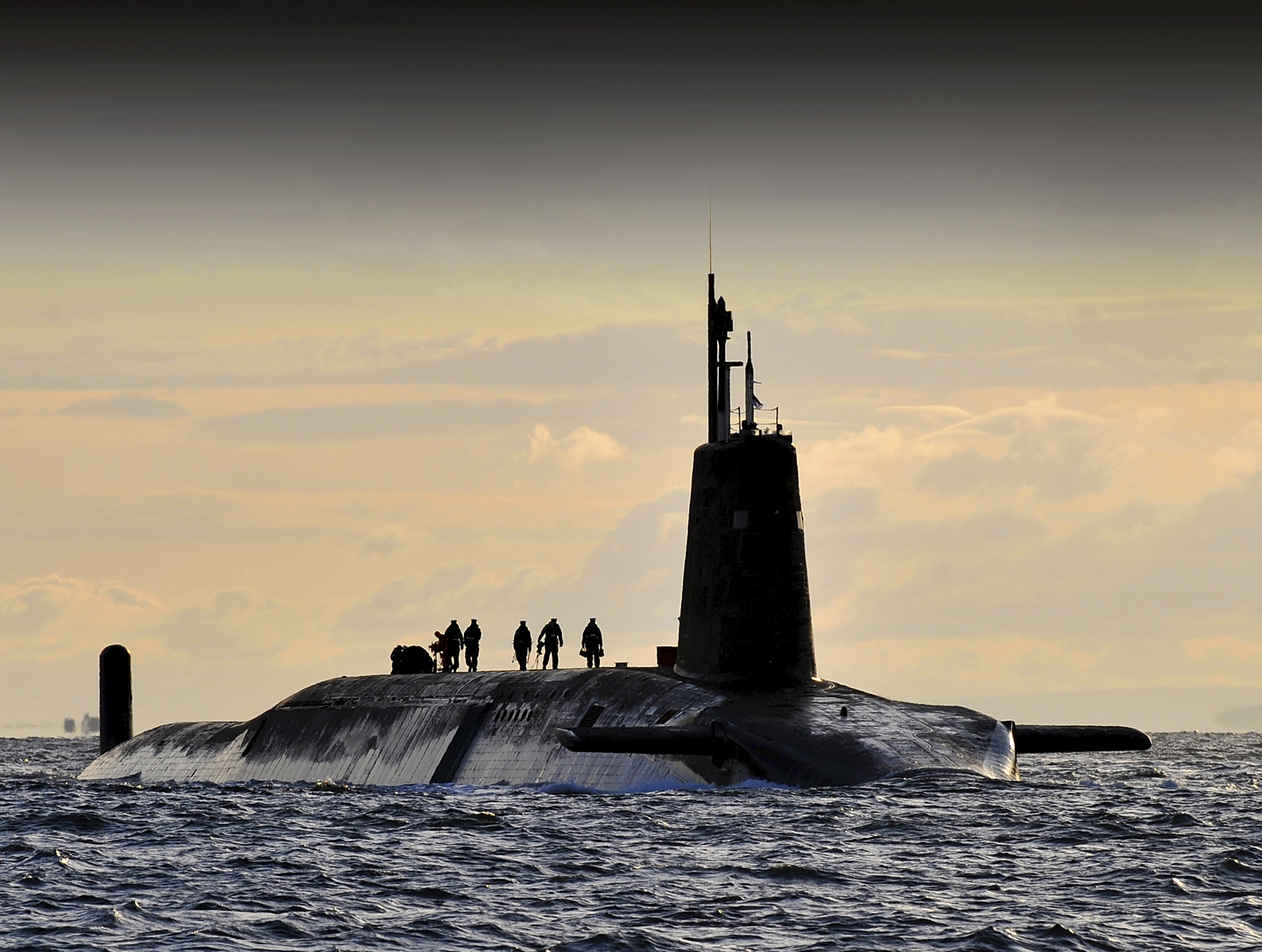
HMS Vanguard, a Vanguard-class ballistic missile submarine

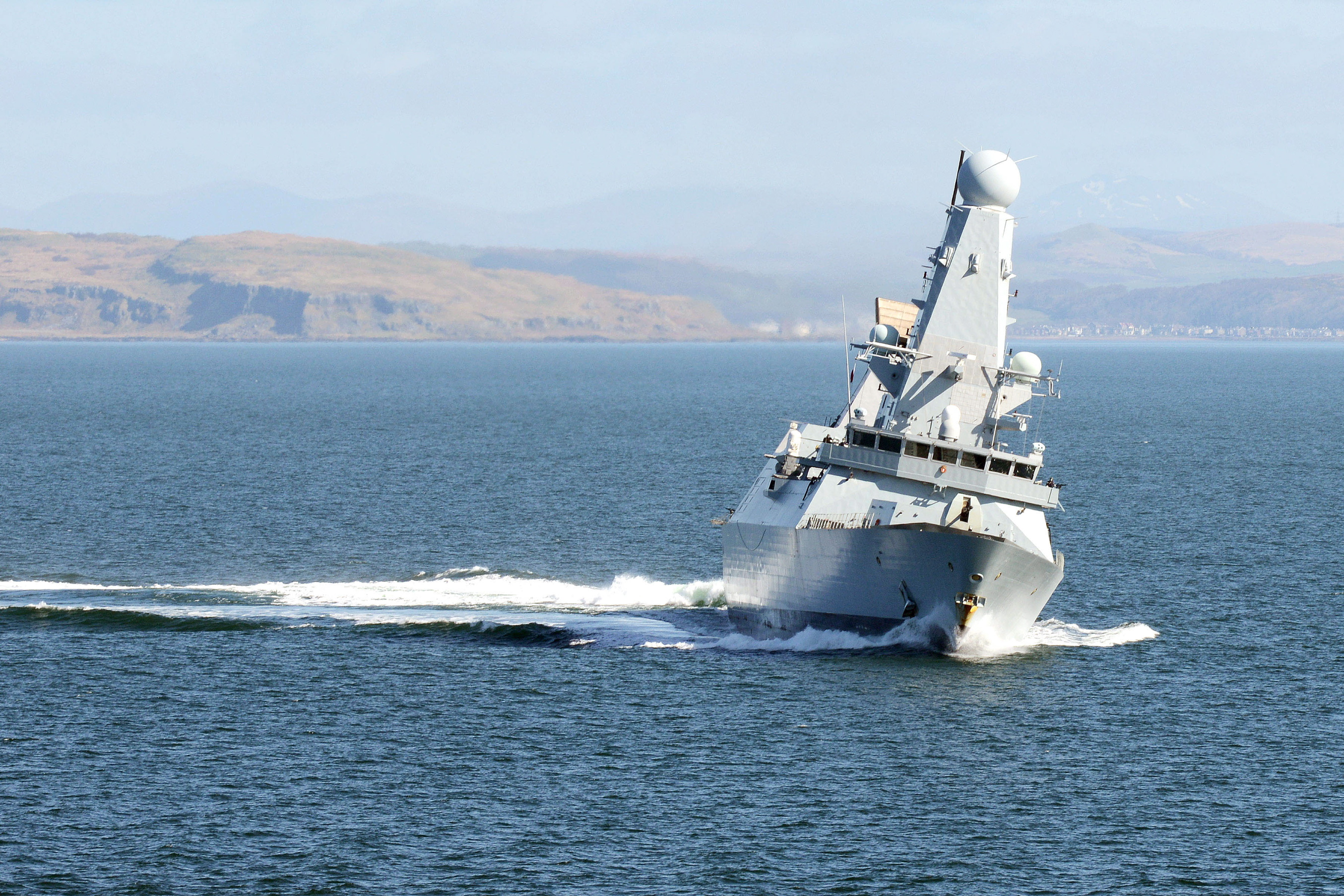
HMS Diamond, a Type 45 guided missile destroyer

=== Royal Marines ===
The infantry component of the Naval Service is the Corps of Royal Marines. Consisting of a single manoeuvre brigade (UK Commando Force) and various independent units, the Royal Marines specialise in amphibious, arctic, and mountain warfare. Contained within the UK Commando Force are attached army units; 29 Commando Regiment Royal Artillery, an artillery regiment based in Plymouth, and 24 Commando Regiment Royal Engineers. Both regiments have Commando REME detachments. The Commando Logistic Regiment consists of personnel from the Army, Royal Marines, and Royal Navy.

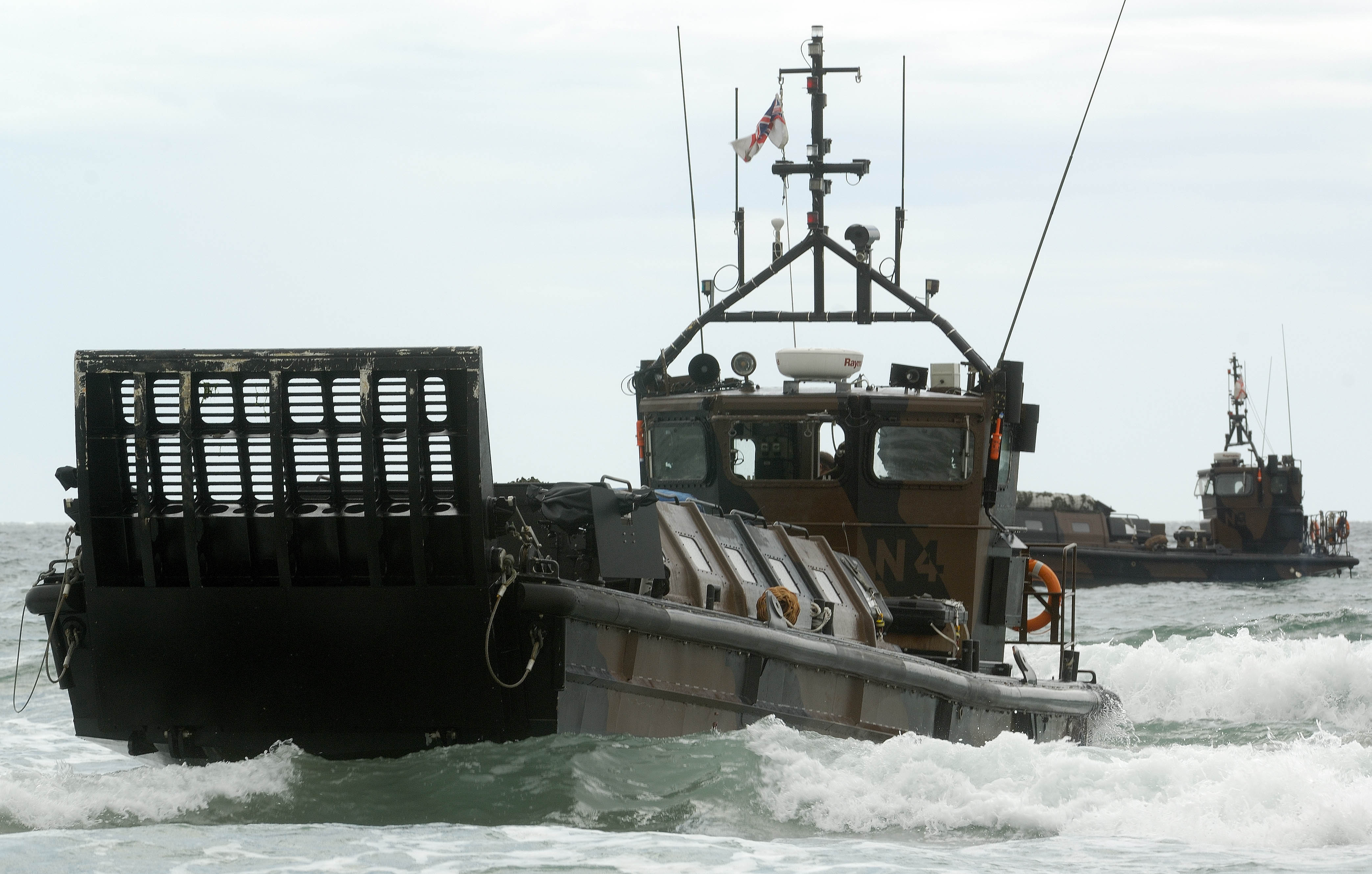
Mk5 Landing Craft Vehicle Personnel

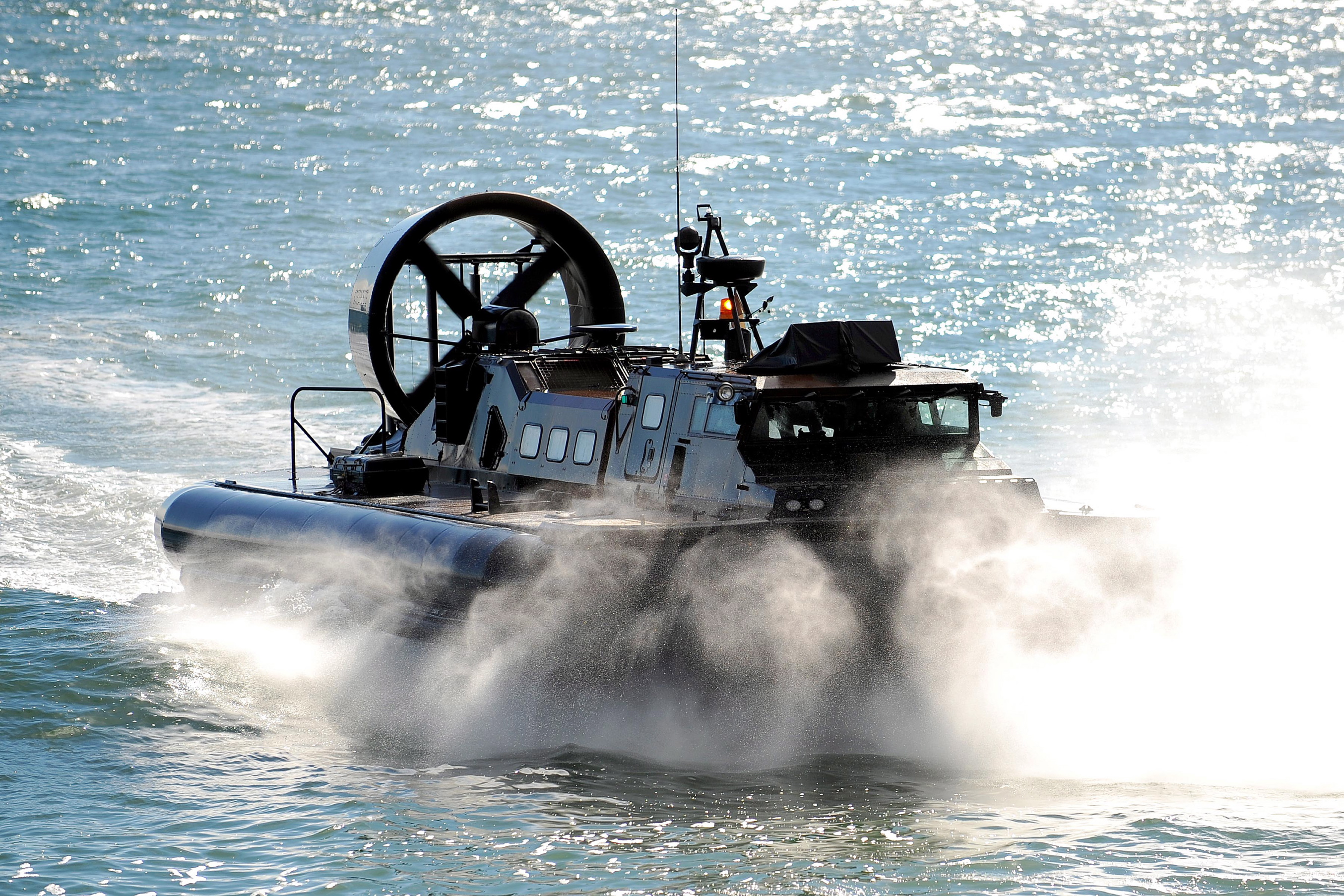
2000TDX Landing Craft Air Cushion

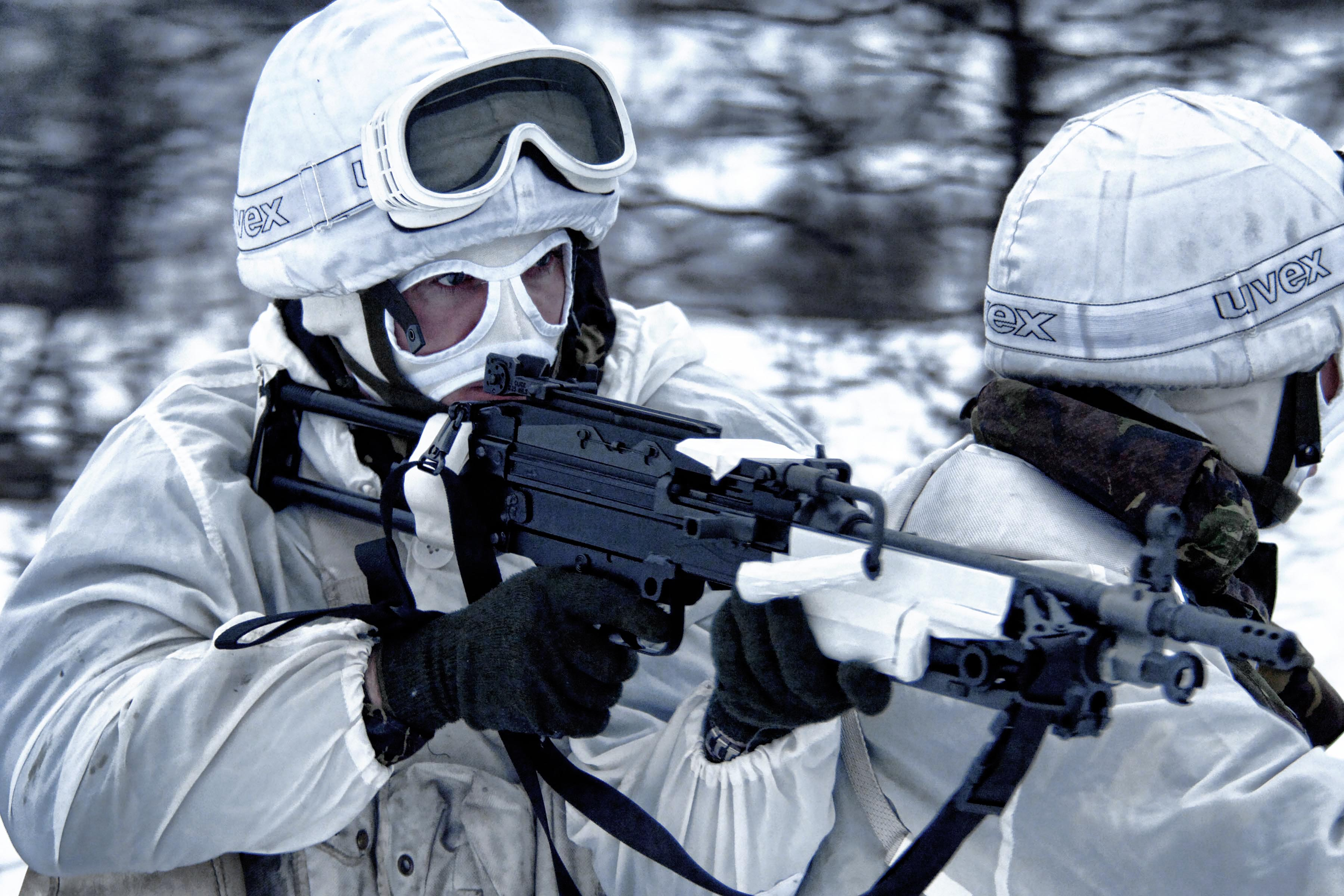
Royal Marines during the annual Cold Weather Training exercise

=== Royal Fleet Auxiliary ===
The Royal Fleet Auxiliary is a civilian-crewed fleet owned by the British Ministry of Defence. The RFA enables ships of the Royal Navy to maintain operations around the world. Its primary role is to supply the Royal Navy with fuel, ammunition and supplies, normally by replenishment at sea (RAS). It also transports Army and Royal Marine personnel, as well as supporting training exercises. RFA personnel are members of the Ministry of Defence civil service who wear Merchant Navy rank insignia with naval uniforms and are under naval discipline when the vessel is engaged on warlike operations. RFA vessels are commanded and crewed by these civilians, augmented with regular and reserve Royal Navy personnel to perform specialised military functions such as operating and maintaining helicopters or providing hospital facilities. The RFA is funded out of the UK defence budget and the Commodore commanding the RFA is directly responsible to the Royal Navy Fleet Commander.

The Royal Fleet Auxiliary also provides the naval service's principal amphibious warfare capability through its three Bay-class landing ship dock vessels. The service is crewed by around 1,750 civilian personnel (as of late 2022).

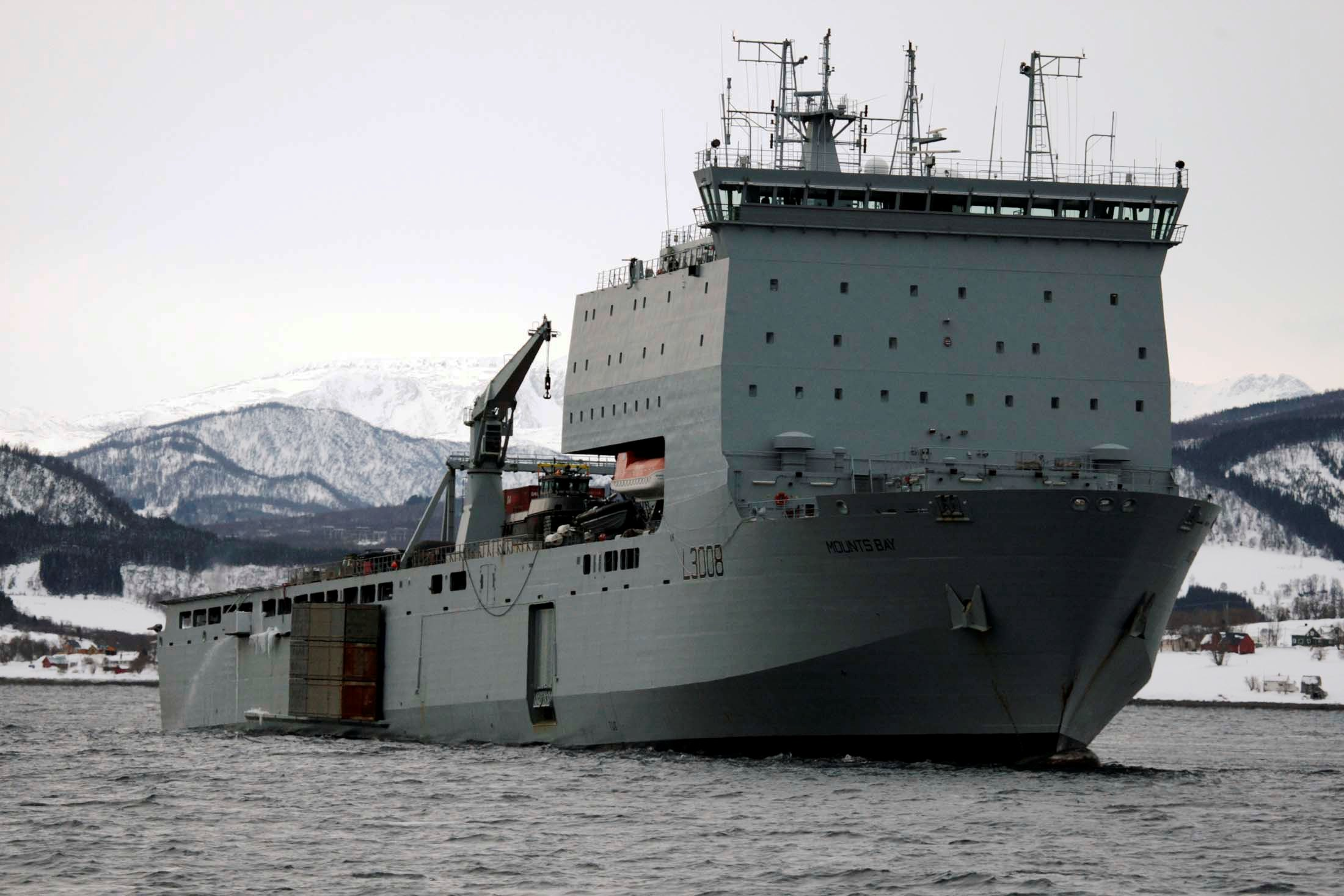
RFA Mounts Bay, a Bay-class landing ship

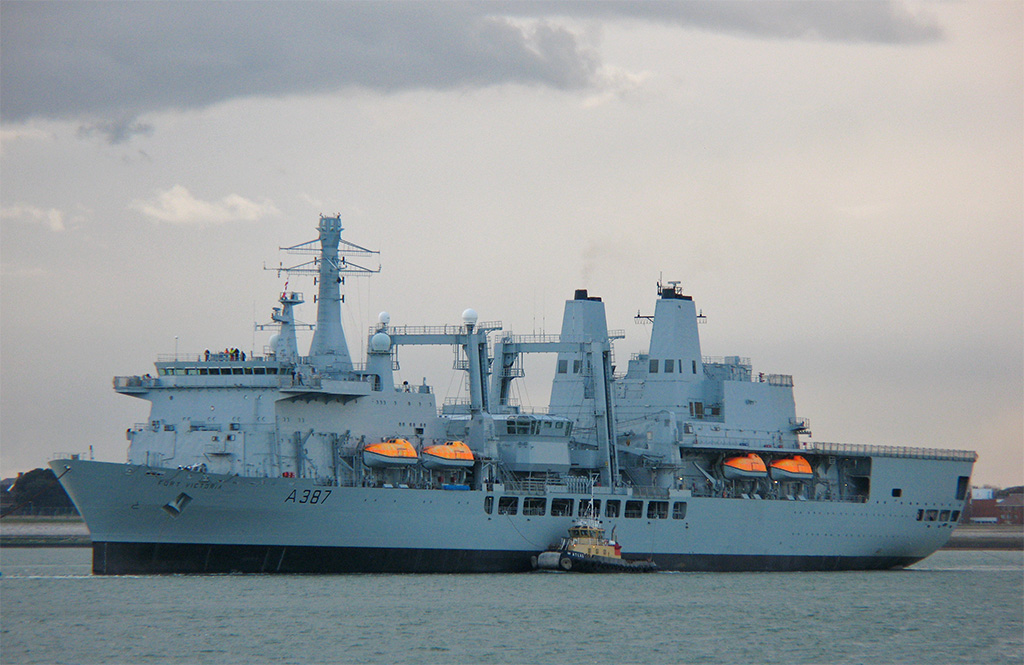
RFA Fort Victoria, a replenishment oiler

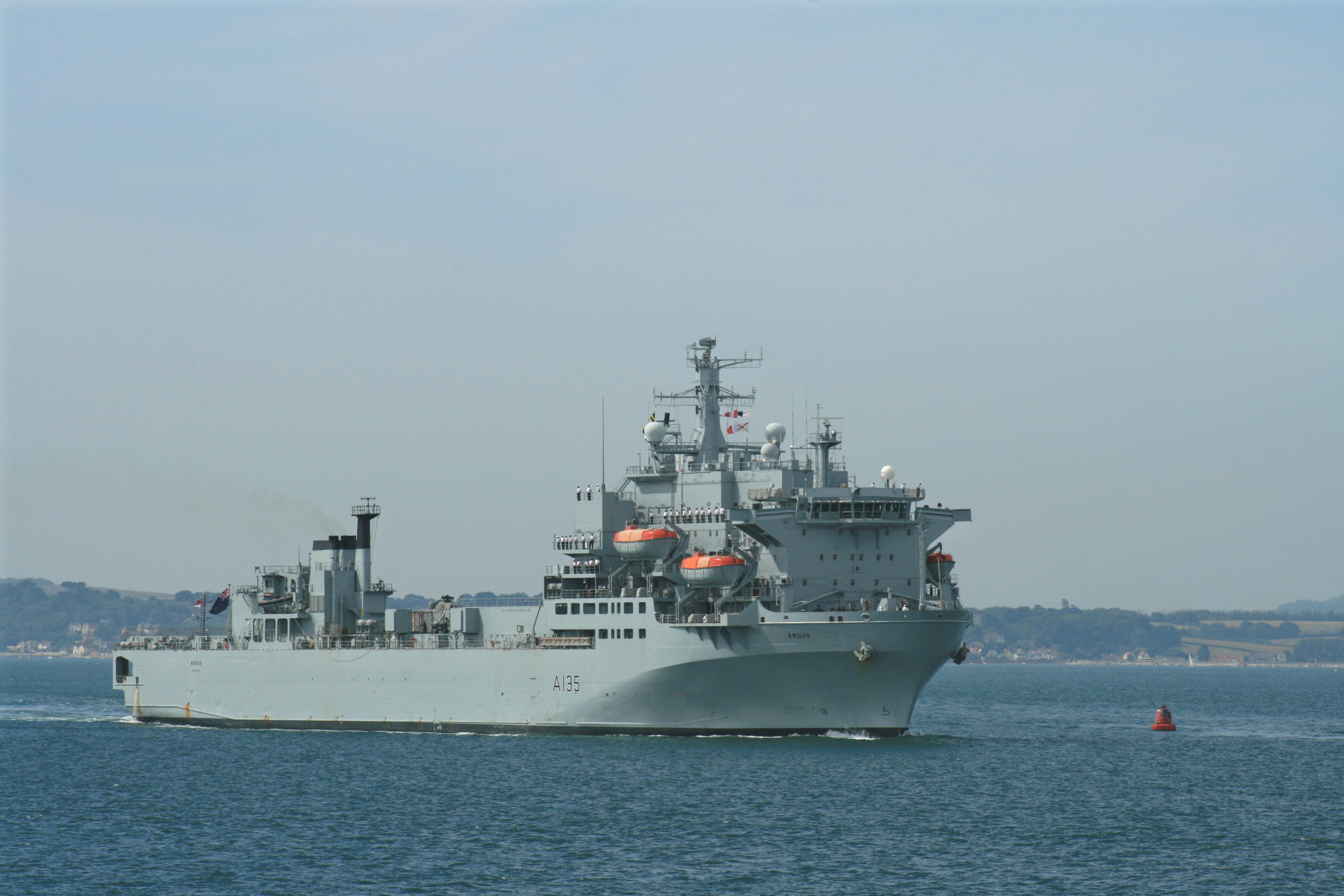
RFA Argus, an aviation training and casualty receiving ship

=== Naval Careers Service ===
The Naval Careers Service is the recruiting arm of the Naval Service. It is crewed by former Royal Navy and Royal Marine personnel who are typically based at Armed Forces Careers Offices. It is the smallest component of the Naval Service, comprising fewer than 200 personnel.

== In support of the Naval Service ==
=== Marine Services, U.K. ===
Marine Services enables Royal Navy and Royal Fleet Auxiliary Ships, including the United Kingdom's Strategic Nuclear Deterrent, to either move in or out of port for operational deployment and training exercises around the world. The service operates a large assortment of vessels including tugs and pilot boats as well as transporting stores, liquid and munitions and providing passenger transfer services to and from ships for officers and crew. Serco Denholm took over Marine Services to the Naval Service from the now disbanded Royal Maritime Auxiliary Service in 2008. In late 2009 Serco bought out Denholm's share, with the service now being known as Serco Marine Services. In 2025, Serco won a renewal of the contract to continue services for the Naval Service until 2035.

=== Marine Services, Gibraltar ===
Marine services at the Port of Gibraltar, including naval vessels using the port, are provided by Boluda Towage Europe. Boluda acquired Resolve Marine Group in 2024, which had been equipped with one ASD ocean-going and harbour tug (Resolve Hercules), four harbour tugs (Rooke, Wellington, Egerton and Eliott), two barges (Isaac 1874 and RMG 280) as well as the anchor-handling tug Resolve Blizzard, which provided regional firefighting, oil pollution and emergency response services. Several of these assets were acquired by Boluda which, in June 2024, also strengthened its own presence at Gibraltar by adding the tugboat “VB Responder” to its fleet.

=== Marine Services, Falkland Islands ===
As of 2021, marine services at the British military and naval port in the Falkland Islands, Mare Harbour, were provided by the contracted Netherlands Marine Services company Van Wijngaarden. The company operated two tugs (Giesenstroom and Dintelstroom) as well as a multi-purpose barge (MP3002) at the port.

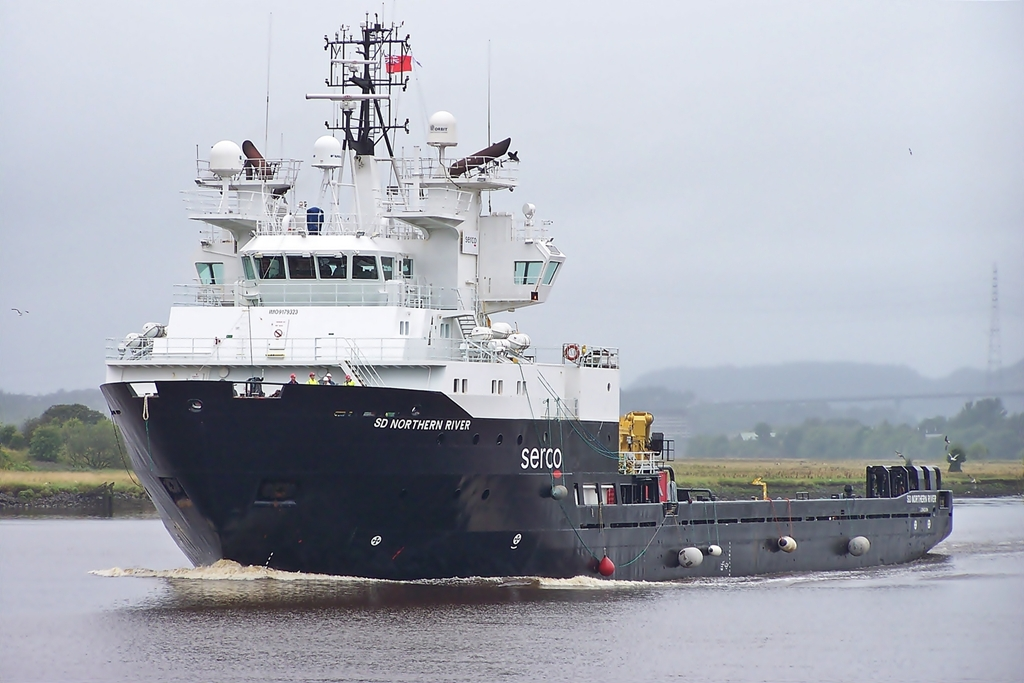
SD Northern River, a Marine Services multi-purpose ship

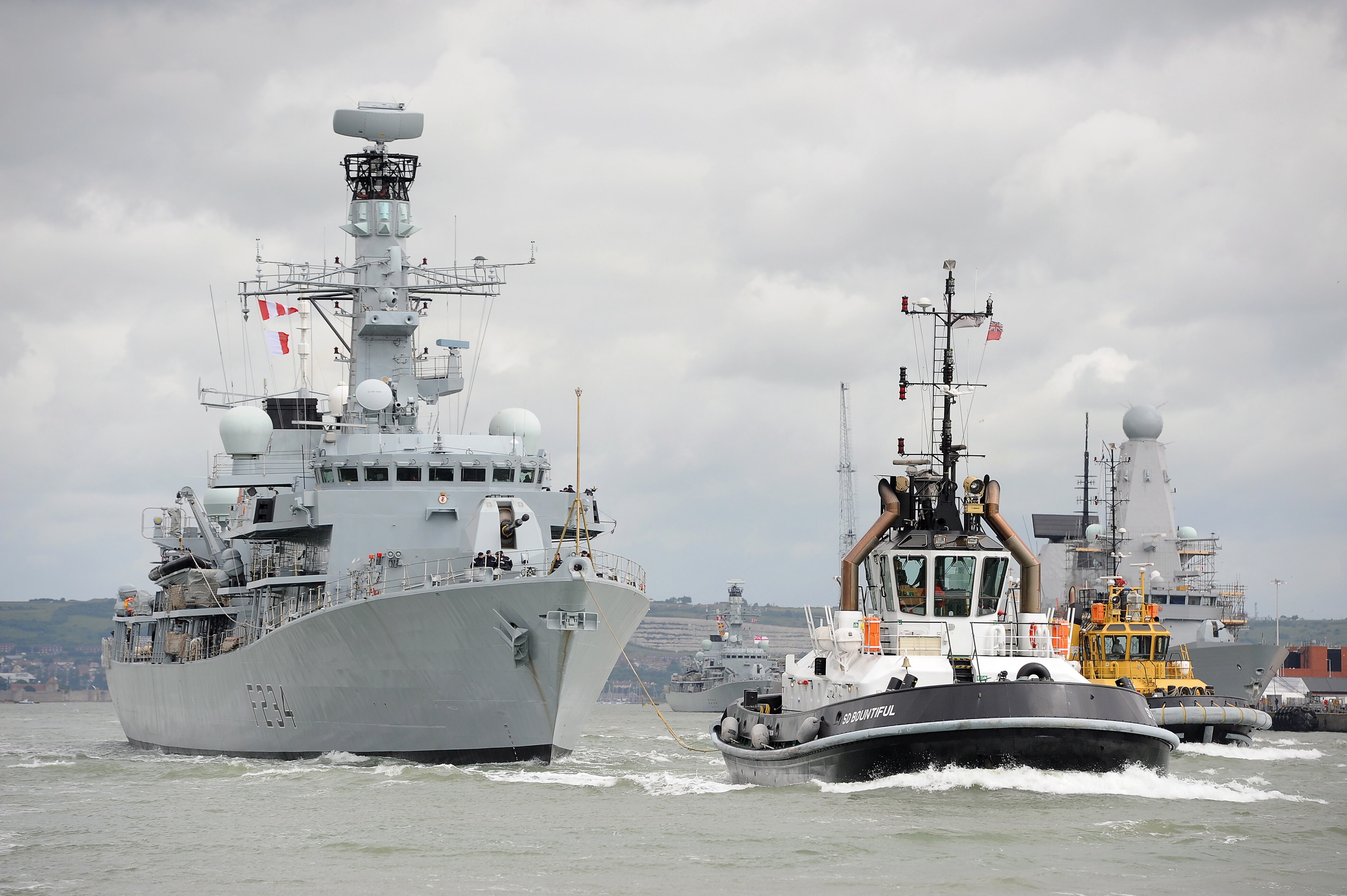
SD Bountiful, a Marine Services ATD 2909-class tug

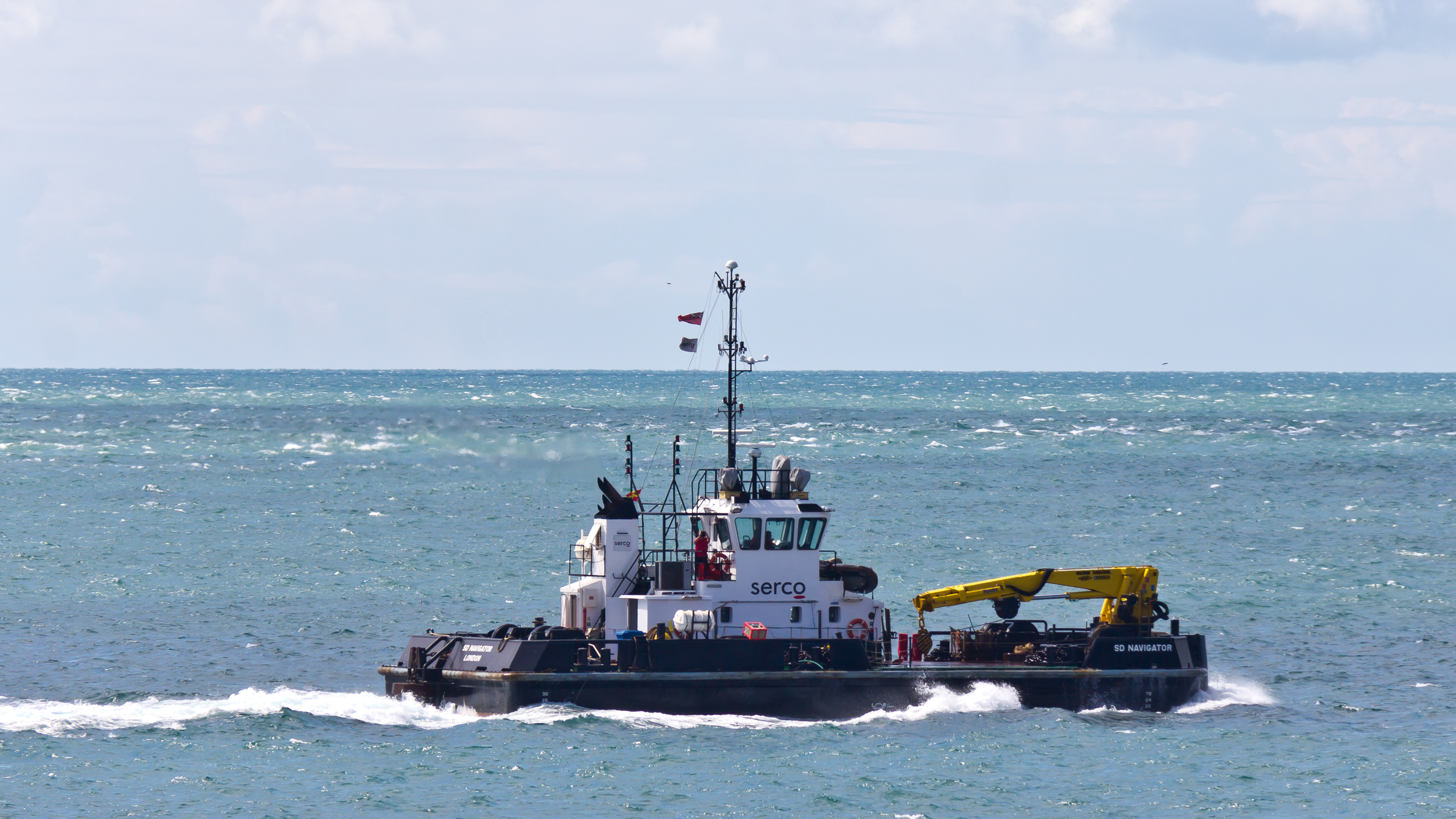
SD Navigator, a Marine Services Multicat 2510-class recovery vessel

== Lists of vessels ==
See the articles below for lists of vessels operated by or in support of His Majesty's Naval Service:

- List of active Royal Navy ships - 60 (including ten nuclear-powered submarines; plus additionally two non-commissioned training vessels, one experimental ship, one experimental uncrewed submarine and several dozen smaller boats)
- List of active Royal Marines military watercraft - 17 principal landing craft (plus three patrol boats and some 85 smaller Commando and inshore raiding craft; Special Boat Service operates additional specialist craft, including up to three combat submersibles)
- List of active Royal Fleet Auxiliary ships - 9 (plus additional ships under charter to the MoD)
- List of ships of Serco Marine Services - 90+ (plus additional vessels operated by other companies in certain overseas territories)

== See also ==
- List of all naval vessels current and former of the United Kingdom
- British Armed Forces
- Royal Navy
- Royal Marines
- Royal Fleet Auxiliary
- His Majesty's Coastguard
- Border Force
- Special Boat Service (SBS)
- Royal Naval Association
