= Rigid Raider =

Series of craft made by RTK Marine

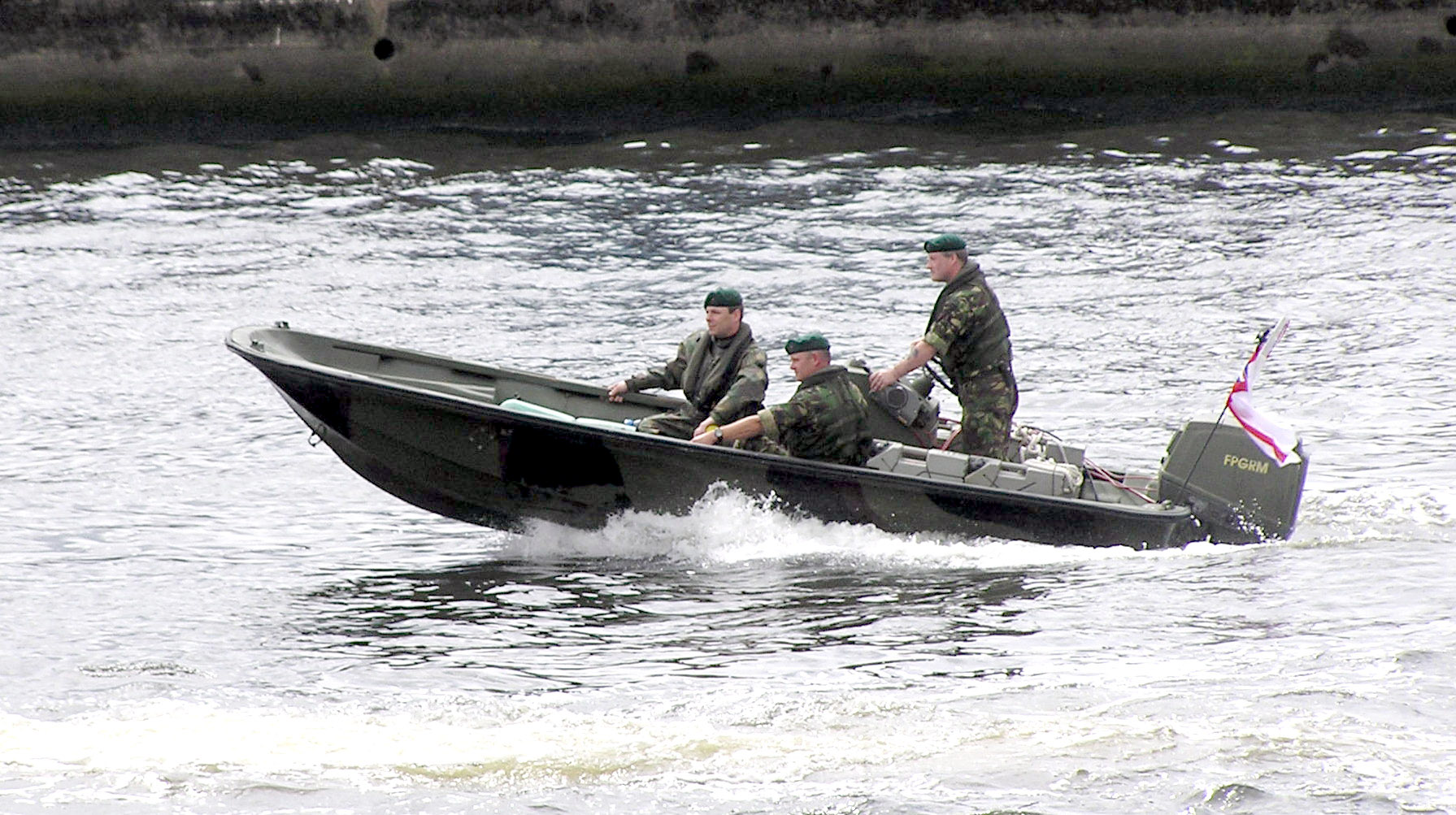
A Royal Marines' Rigid Raider (RRC)

The Rigid Raider (RRC) is a series of fast raiding and assault craft made by RTK Marine, a subsidiary of Halmatic, part of BAE Systems Surface Ships. They are primarily in service with two branches of the British Armed Forces: The Royal Navy (incl. the Royal Marines and the Special Boat Service) and the British Army. Despite being among the smallest of the amphibious craft, the RRC is one of the most widely used due to its mobility and versatility. As such, the Rigid Raider often finds itself deployed in amphibious and riverine operations around the globe, in environments ranging from the Arctic to the tropics.

== Specifications ==
The Rigid Raider Mk3 has the following specifications:

- Hull: Glass-reinforced plastic
- Weight (full): 2,500 kg (2.5 tonnes)
- Length: 6.5 m (21 ft 4 in)
- Width: 1.9 m (6 ft 3 in)
- Engine: 6-cylinder turbo-diesel, 240 hp (180 kW)
- Speed (full): 33 kn (61 km/h; 38 mph)
- Range: In excess of 120 nautical miles (220 km)
- Troops: 10 Royal Marines (2 crew, 8 fully equipped troops)
- Number in service: 50 as of 2023

There is also a larger 8 meter version of the RRC in service with the Royal Navy and Royal Marines.

== See also ==
- List of active Royal Marines military watercraft
