= BAE Fast Interceptor Craft =

Special operations vessel

Class overview
- Builders: BAE Systems
- Operators: Special Boat Service

General characteristics
- Type: Special forces boat
- Length: 33: 10.75 metres (35.3 ft); 40: 13.07 metres (42.9 ft); 180: 18.1 metres (59 ft)
- Beam: 33: 2.59 metres (8 ft 6 in); 40: 2.83 metres (9 ft 3 in); 180: 3.8 metres (12 ft)
- Draught: 33: 0.7 metres (2 ft 4 in); 40: 0.82 metres (2 ft 8 in); 180: 0.9 metres (2 ft 11 in)
- Propulsion: See text
- Armament: Weapons of up to .50" calibre

The BAE Systems Fast Interceptor Craft is a stealthy boat used by the Special Boat Service. The builder offers it in several configurations, the 33, 40 and 180 versions. There are a variety of propulsion types available, including both inboard and outboard engines with surface drives or water jets. The boats are air portable in Hercules, C-17 and A400M aircraft.
