= HMNB Clyde =

Royal Naval base in Scotland

HMNB Clyde
- Gare Loch and Loch Long, Argyll and Bute, Scotland
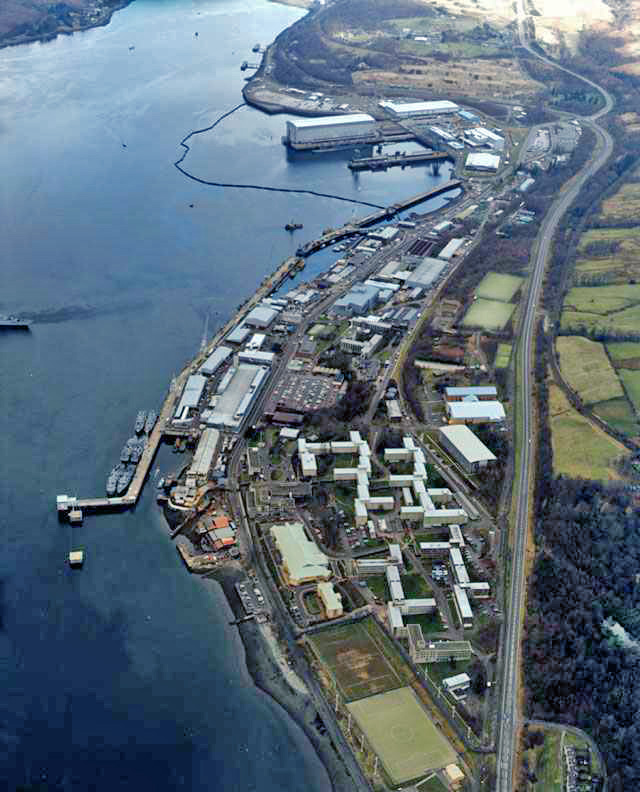
- Aerial view of Faslane Bay and HMS Neptune

Site information
- Type: Naval base
- Owner: Ministry of Defence
- Operator: Royal Navy
- Controlled by: Naval Base Commander, Clyde
- Condition: Operational
- Website: HMMB Clyde - Royal Navy

Location
- Location in Argyll and Bute HMNB Clyde (the United Kingdom)
- Coordinates: 56°03′58″N 04°49′03″W
- Area: 87 hectares (210 acres)

Site history
- Built: 1940s
- In use: 1940s–present

Garrison information
- Current commander: Commodore Sharon Malkin: December 2022 – present
- Garrison: Submarine Service

His Majesty's Naval Base Clyde (HMNB Clyde) is the Royal Navy's main shore establishment in Scotland. It is home to the United Kingdom's fleet of nuclear submarines, including attack submarines and ballistic missile submarines. The main part of the base, officially named HMS Neptune and commonly known as Faslane, lies on Faslane Bay in Gare Loch, an inlet of the Firth of Clyde. The base also includes the Royal Naval Armaments Depot at Coulport on Loch Long, which stores, maintains and issues Trident missiles.

== History ==
Faslane Port was first constructed in the Second World War. During the 1960s, the British Government began negotiating the Polaris Sales Agreement with the United States regarding the purchase of a Polaris missile system to fire British-built nuclear weapons from five specially constructed submarines. In the end, only four were constructed: HMS Resolution, HMS Repulse, HMS Renown and HMS Revenge. These four submarines were permanently based at Faslane.

Faslane itself was chosen to host these vessels at the height of the Cold War because of its geographic position, which forms a bastion on the relatively secluded but deep and easily navigable Gare Loch and Firth of Clyde on the west coast of Scotland. This position provides for rapid and stealthy access through the North Channel to the submarine patrolling areas in the North Atlantic, through the GIUK gap to the Norwegian Sea. At the time it was chosen, the location was also close to the American SSBN base at Holy Loch, which operated between 1961 and 1992. One boat was always on patrol at any given time.

In 1971, the base was home to the 3rd Submarine Squadron of Nuclear Fleet and Diesel Patrol Submarines, "the fighters", and the 10th Submarine Squadron, consisting of the four Polaris submarines, "the bombers".

On 19 March 2026, a 34-year-old Iranian man and a 31-year-old Romanian woman were arrested at the base after being refused permission to enter. Their intentions were unclear.

== Clyde-based vessels and units ==
The following notable vessels and units are based at Faslane.

=== Royal Navy ===
Commodore J. L. Perks OBE, Commander Submarine Flotilla/Commodore Submarine Service

- Vanguard-class SSBNs
  - HMS Vanguard
  - HMS Victorious
  - HMS Vigilant
  - HMS Vengeance
- Astute-class SSNs
  - HMS Astute
  - HMS Ambush
  - HMS Artful
  - HMS Audacious
  - HMS Anson
  - HMS Agamemnon (on sea trials as of September 2026)
- Sandown-class mine countermeasures vessel:
  - HMS Bangor
- Faslane Patrol Boat Squadron (Archer-class patrol vessels):
  - HMS Tracker
  - HMS Raider
- Northern Diving Group
  - 1 x Sea-class 15m diving support boat
- Mine Threat and Exploitation Group
  - Arcims-class autonomous vessels
    - RNMB Hebe
    - RNMB Hydra
    - RNMB Hussar
    - RNMB Hazard
    - RNMB Harrier (forward deployed with 9 MCM Squadron at HMS Jufair, Bahrain in 2023)
    - RNMB Halcyon
    - RNMB Hellcat

Four vessels (Halcyon, Hussar, Hydra and Harrier) enabled for autonomous/uncrewed operations. Hebe accommodates a Portable Operations Centre Afloat that allows command & control of autonomous operations. The other vessels have been employed as crewed workboats for route surveys in Britain and elsewhere, as well as for trials of small uncrewed underwater vehicles.

Royal Marines (UK Commando Force)

- 43 Commando Fleet Protection Group
  - Headquarters Squadron
  - O Rifle Squadron
  - P Rifle Squadron
  - R Rifle Squadron
  - Island-class patrol vessels
    - Mull
    - Rona
    - Eorsa

=== Serco Marine Services ===
- Multicat 2613-class utility boat
  - SD Angeline
- Coastal oilers
  - SD Oilman
  - SD Waterpress
- Impulse-class tugs
  - SD Impulse (A344)
  - SD Impetus (A345)
- ATD 2909-class tugs
  - SD Reliable
  - SD Resourceful
  - SD Dependable
- STAN 2608-class tugs
  - SD Jupiter
- Oban-class tenders
  - SD Oronsay
  - SD Omagh
- Personnel ferries
- STAN 1505-class tenders
  - SD Clyde Racer
- STAN 1905-class tenders
  - SD Clyde Spirit

=== Ministry of Defence Police ===
- Clyde Marine Unit
  - Island-class patrol vessels
    - Iona
    - Skye
    - Lismore
    - Barra
    - Harris
    - Jura
- Nuclear Division (Faslane Station)
- Central Support Group

== Role and operations ==
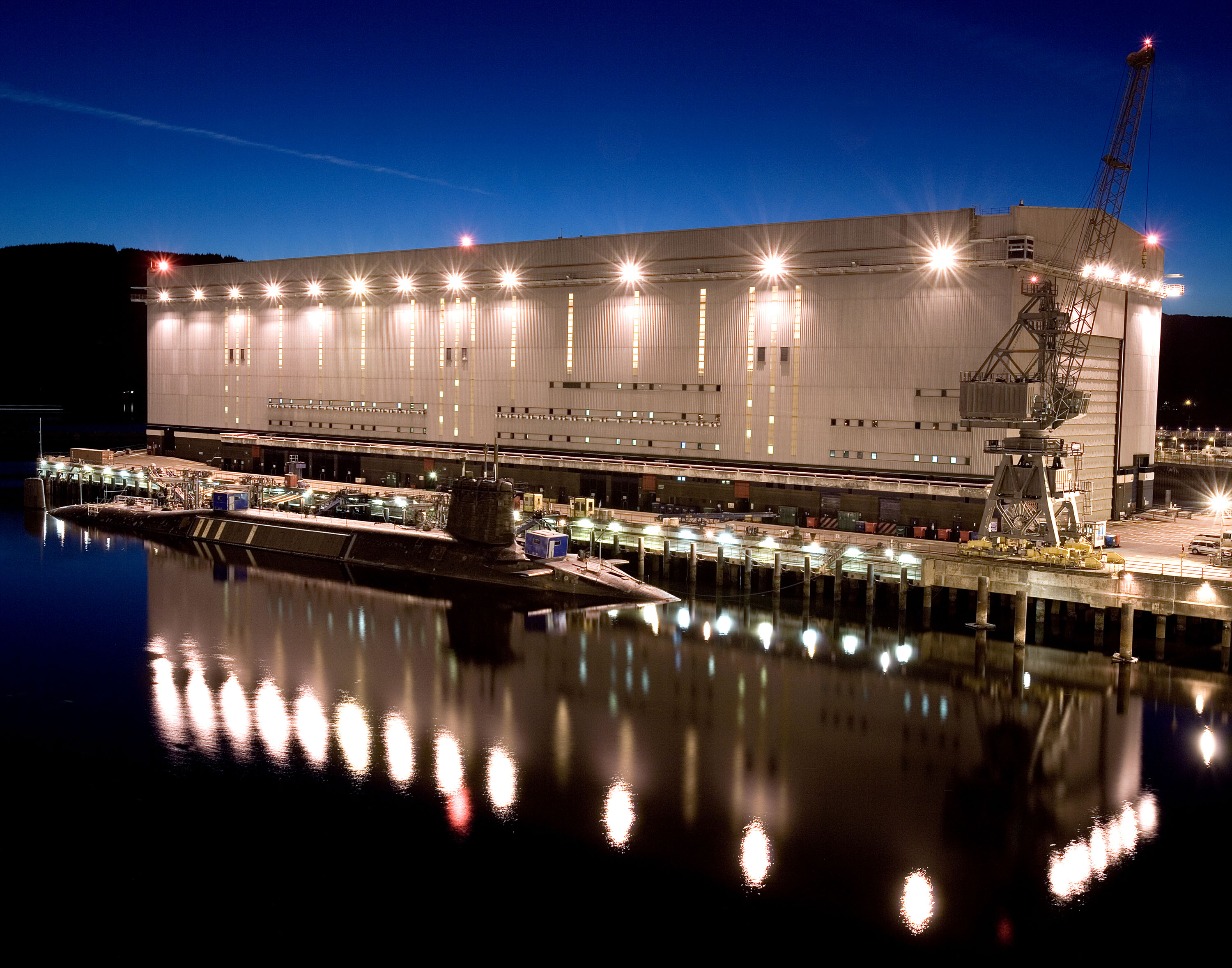
HMS Vigilant alongside at Faslane

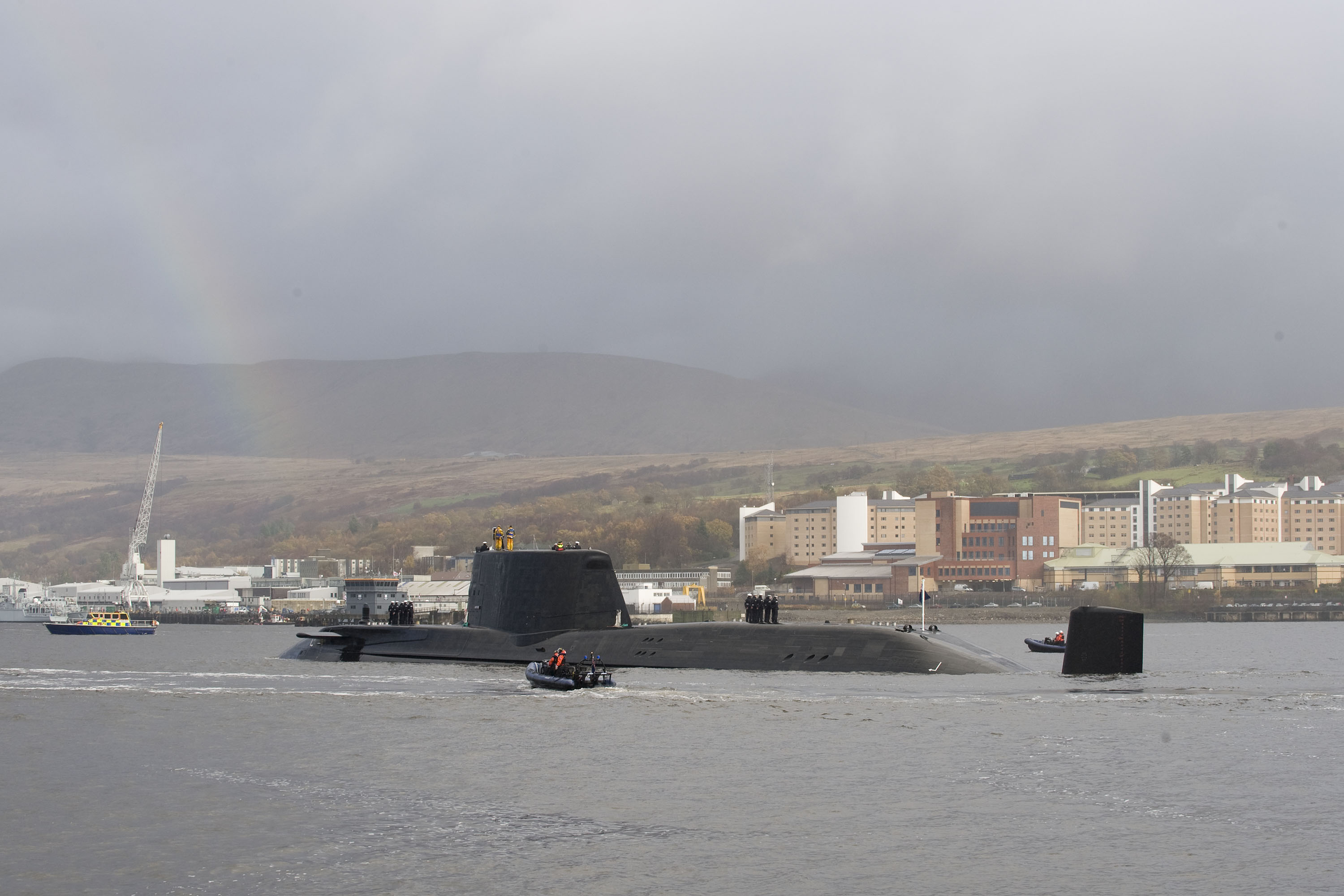
HMS Astute arriving at Faslane for the first time

HMNB Clyde lies on the eastern shore of Gare Loch in Argyll and Bute, to the north of the Firth of Clyde and 25 mi (40 km) west of Glasgow. The submarine base encompasses a number of separate sites, the primary two being:

- Faslane, 25 miles from Glasgow;
- RNAD Coulport, beside Loch Long, 2 mi (3.2 km) west of Faslane by air, approximately 8 mi (13 km) by road or 19 mi (31 km) by sea.

Faslane is also a Defence Equipment and Support site, operated in dual site organisation with Great Harbour, Greenock, by Babcock Marine and Technology, and managed by Serco Denholm.

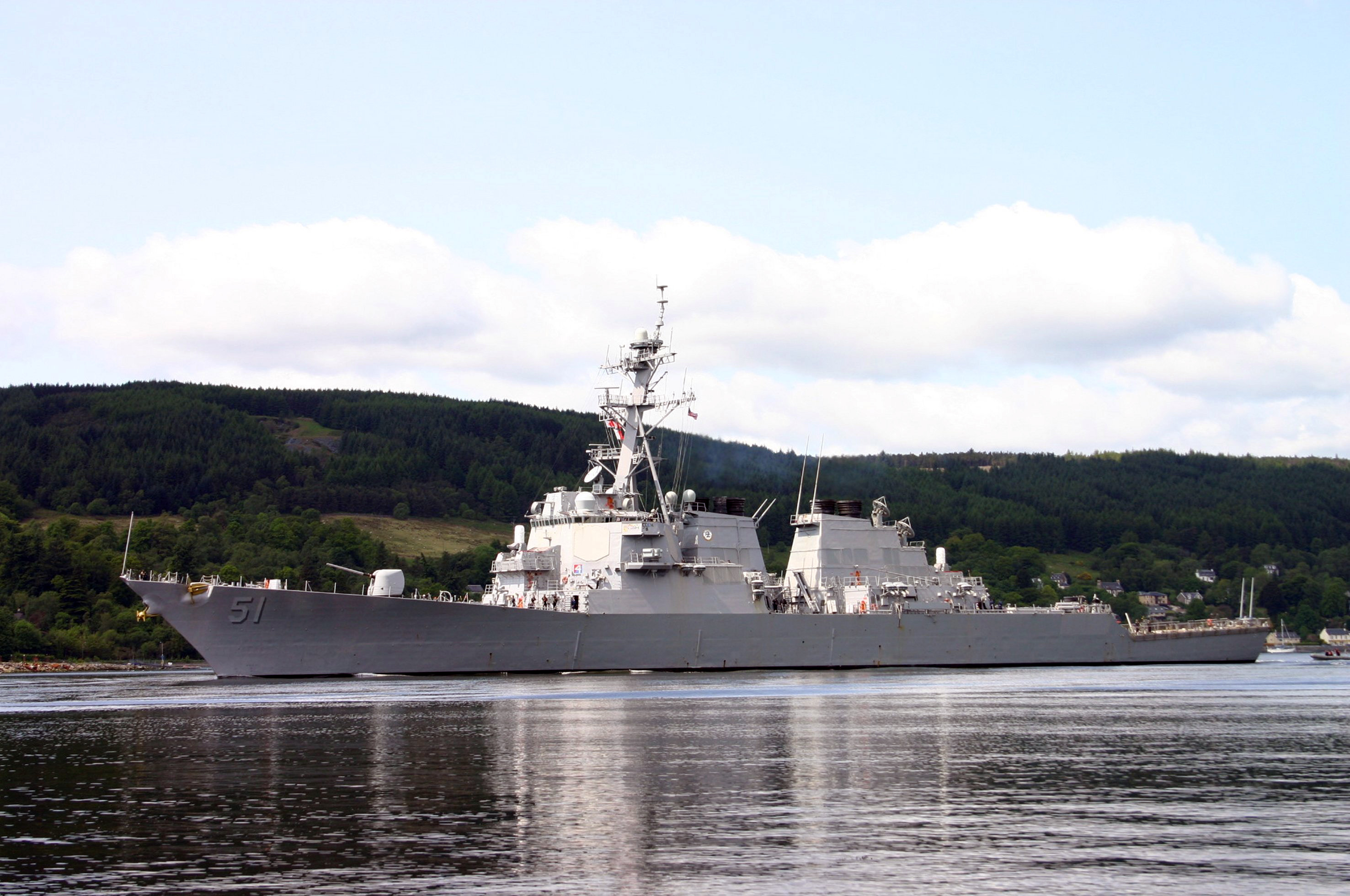
USS Arleigh Burke departing HMNB Clyde

The naval shore establishment at Faslane is HMS Neptune. Naval personnel appointed to the base who do not belong to a seagoing vessel make up ship's company. Both Gare Loch and Loch Long are sea lochs extending northwards from the Firth of Clyde. The base serves as home base to Britain's fleet of Vanguard-class nuclear-powered and nuclear-armed submarines, as well as conventionally armed nuclear-powered submarines, supported by the 43 Commando Fleet Protection Group Royal Marines.

In command of HMNB Clyde is the Naval Base Commander (Clyde), Commodore Sharon Malkin. The base is home to a number of lodger units, including Flag Officer Scotland and Northern Ireland (who is also Rear Admiral Submarines), the Northern Diving Group and the Scottish headquarters of the Ministry of Defence Police. It is base to 3,000 service personnel, 800 of their families and 4,000 civilian workers, largely from Babcock Marine, forming a major part of the economy of Argyll and Bute and West Dunbartonshire.

In 2018, the Secretary of State for Scotland at the time, David Mundell, said: "The UK's entire submarine fleet will be based at Faslane by 2020. This will reinforce Scotland's vital role in protecting our country, and guarantee skilled, secure jobs on the Clyde for years to come."

== Safety and accidents at Faslane ==
Exercise Evening Star is the annual test of the emergency response routines to a nuclear weapon accident at Faslane. It is conducted by the Office for Nuclear Regulation. In 2011 the test failed as "a number of command and control aspects of the exercise were not considered to have been adequately demonstrated".

In 2013–14 there were 99 radiation accidents concerning nuclear reactors, and 6 with nuclear weapons. These are the highest numbers for at least six years. The Ministry of Defence (MoD) maintains that there was no risk to the public as most of them were minor accidents. The SNP defence spokesman, Angus Robertson, called the figures "totally shocking".

In 2015 the MoD argued that it was "entirely misleading" to focus only on the number of incidents, because they include "very minor issues such as the failure to fill out the correct form before painting works began." Indeed, the MoD stated that this "rigorous system shows how seriously MoD takes all aspects of nuclear safety, ensuring lessons are learned, and we can be clear that none of the events in the reports posed any risk to the health of our personnel, or to any members of the public." Indeed, one of the recorded events was the incorrect labeling of an empty pallet. Minor events were reported and investigated so that performance could be continuously improved. "This comprehensive, independent recording process allows Clyde to maintain a robust reporting culture, undertake learning from experience and to take early corrective action," the Defence Minister, Philip Dunne, told MPs.

In August 2025, Defence Procurement Minister Maria Eagle announced that a Category A event had occurred at the base between January and April 2025, defined as an incident with "actual or high potential for radioactive release to the environment". She would not provide details for national security reasons. She also stated two Category B events ("contained radiation exposure") and 100 Category C and D failures had occurred between 22 April 2024 and 22 April 2025. All the events were at International Nuclear and Radiological Event Scale level one and no staff or public were harmed.

== Anti-nuclear demonstrations ==
Given the presence of these nuclear capable missiles, Faslane has attracted demonstrations by Campaign for Nuclear Disarmament and other Scottish pressure groups, including Trident Ploughshares. Since 1982, a permanent peace camp is outside the base gates, where there are frequent demonstrations and regular Wednesday protests. The presence of Faslane is also an issue in Scottish politics.

The Scottish National Party (SNP), the Scottish Socialist Party, and the Scottish Greens all oppose the deployment of nuclear weapons although the SNP have made assurances that they would retain the base for the servicing of conventionally armed and conventionally powered naval units. Members of those parties and indeed some from the Labour Party are often present at rallies. Also, some former independents, such as George Galloway attend rallies outside Faslane.

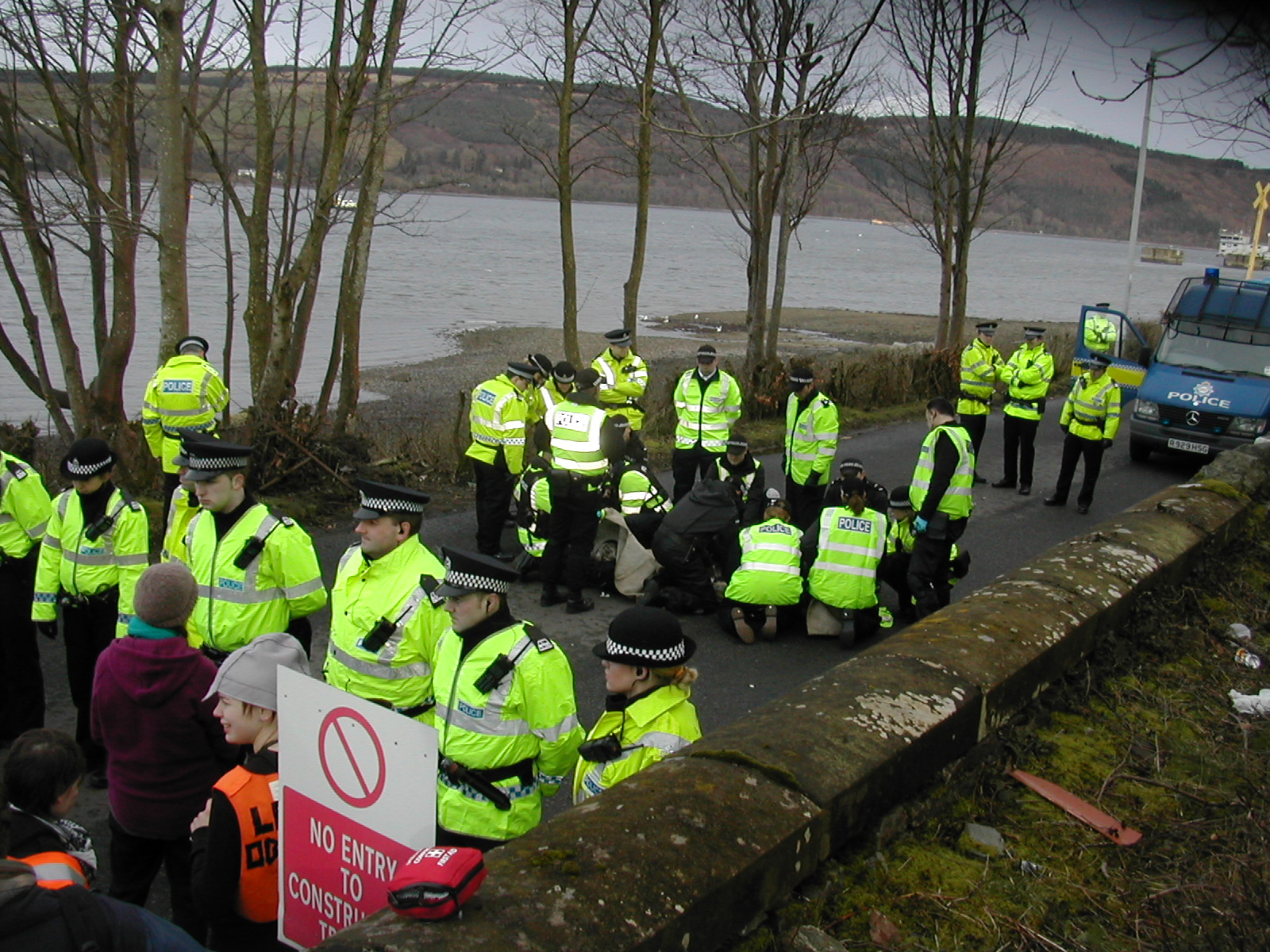
Police dismantling a blockade of protesters from York at the south gate of the Faslane base

=== Faslane 365 ===
The Faslane 365 campaign was a one-year protest at the base. It was a civil resistance initiative to apply critical public pressure for the disarmament of Britain's nuclear weapons.

The campaign was launched in September 2006, with the first protest action commencing on 1 October 2006 carried out by a campaigning group of women associated with protests at Greenham Common. It formally ended with a "Big Blockade" on 1 October 2007.

131 blockading groups took part in Faslane 365 and 1150 arrests were made.

== See also ==
- Armed forces in Scotland
- Military history of Scotland
