= Royal Marines =

Maritime land warfare force of the United Kingdom

- Badge of the Royal Marines
- Active: 28 October 1664 – present (361 years, 11 months)
- Country: United Kingdom
- Type: Marines
- Role: Amphibious warfare Special operations capable
- Size: 5,820 as of 1 April 2022: 770 officers; 5,050 other ranks
- Part of: His Majesty's Naval Service
- Nicknames: "Royals" "Bootnecks" "The Commandos" "Jollies"
- Mottos: Per Mare, Per Terram (Latin) (English: "By Sea, By Land")
- Colours: Royal Navy Blue; Old Gold; Light Infantry Green; Drummer Red
- March: Quick: "A Life on the Ocean Wave"; Slow: "Preobrajensky"
- Engagements: See list: Second Anglo-Dutch War; Third Anglo-Dutch War; Williamite War in Ireland; War of the Spanish Succession; War of Jenkins' Ear; Seven Years' War; American Revolutionary War; French Revolutionary Wars; War of 1812; Battle of Berbera; Napoleonic Wars; Crimean War; First Opium War; Second Opium War; Indian Rebellion; Māori Wars; Anglo-Satsuma War; Expedition to Abyssinia; Anglo-Ashanti wars; Anglo-Egyptian War; Mahdist War; Second Boer War; Boxer Rebellion; First World War; Russian Civil War; Second World War; Invasion of Iceland; Insurgency in Palestine; Civil War in Palestine; Korean War; Suez Crisis; Malayan Emergency; Cyprus Emergency; Indonesia-Malaysia Confrontation; Aden Emergency; The Troubles; Dhofar Rebellion; Falklands War; Persian Gulf War; Bosnian War; Kosovo War; Sierra Leone Civil War; Iraq War; Intervention in Libya; War in Afghanistan
- Website: Official website

Commanders
- Head of the Armed Forces and Captain General: King Charles III
- First Sea Lord and Chief of the Naval Staff: General Sir Gwyn Jenkins
- Second Sea Lord and Deputy Chief of the Naval Staff: Vice Admiral Paul Beattie
- Commandant General: General Sir Gwyn Jenkins

Insignia
- Non‑ceremonial flag

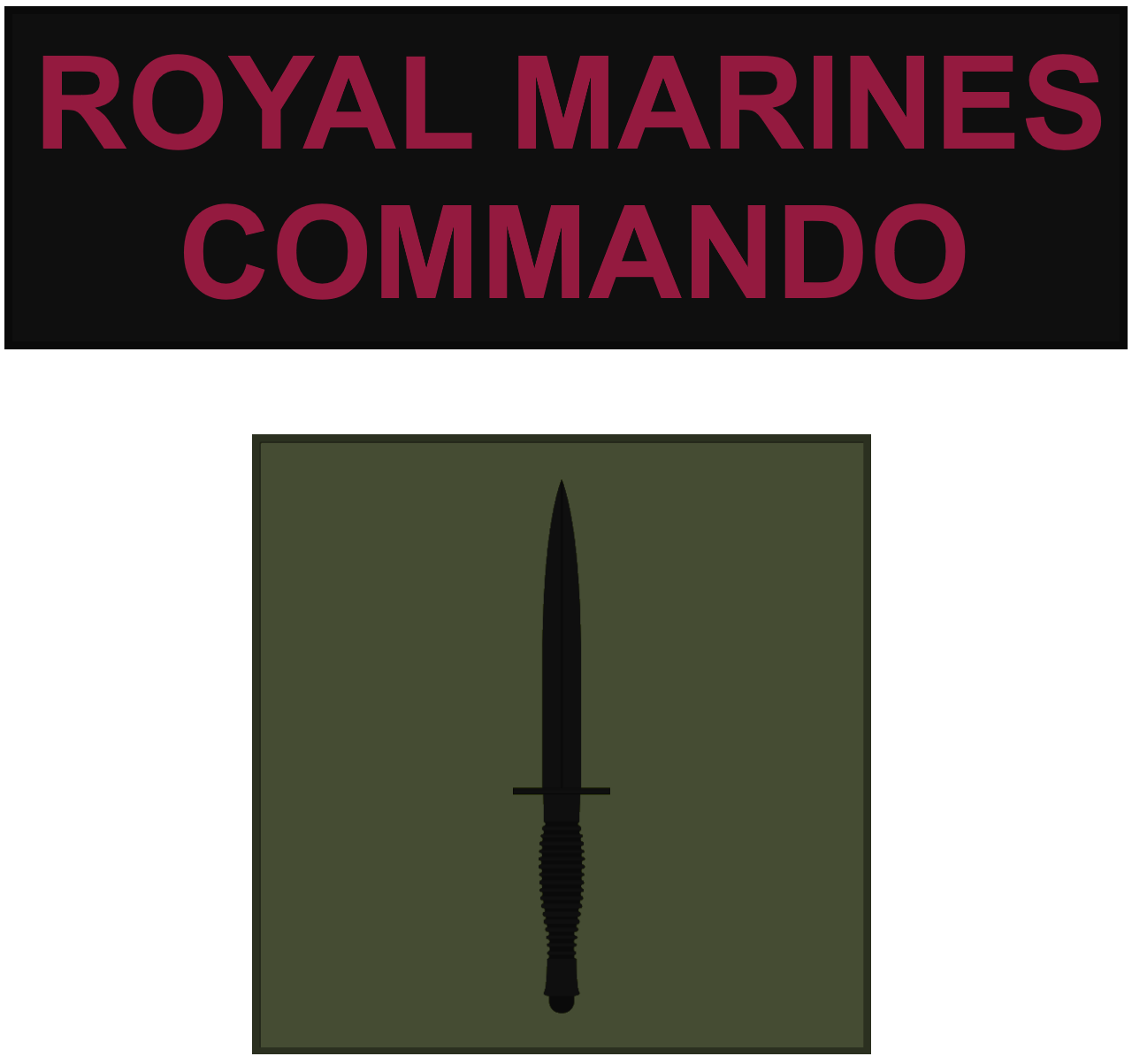
- Identification symbol

His Majesty's Royal Marines are the United Kingdom's special operations-capable naval infantry force and constitute one of the five fighting arms of the Royal Navy. They provide a company-sized sub-unit to the Special Forces Support Group, personnel for landing craft crews, and personnel for the Royal Navy's military bands. The Corps traces its origins to the "Duke of York and Albany's Maritime Regiment of Foot", formed on 28 October 1664. The first Royal Marines commando unit was formed at Deal, Kent, on 14 February 1942 and was designated "The Royal Marine Commando".

The Royal Marines have served in numerous conflicts but, unlike most British Army regiments, do not carry individual battle honours. Instead, the "Great Globe Itself" was granted by George IV in 1827 in recognition of the Marines' service in engagements across the world. Today, the Corps comprises the United Kingdom Commando Force, the Royal Marines Band Service, the Commando Training Centre, and four reserve units.

== History ==
=== Origins ===
The Royal Marines trace their origins back to 28 October 1664, when the Duke of York and Albany's Maritime Regiment of Foot was formed at the grounds of the Honourable Artillery Company.

The "first official" unit of English naval infantry, originally called the Duke of York and Albany's Maritime Regiment of Foot and soon becoming known as the Admiral's Regiment, was formed on 28 October 1664, with an initial strength of 1,200 infantrymen recruited from the Trained Bands of London as part of the mobilisation for the Second Anglo-Dutch War. James, Duke of York and Albany, Lord High Admiral and brother of Charles II, was Captain-General of the Artillery Company, the unit that trained the Trained Bands.

It was the fifth European marine unit formed, being preceded by the Spain's Infantería de Marina (1537), the Fanti da Mar of the Republic of Venice (1550), the Portuguese Marine Corps (1610) and France's Troupes de marine (1622). It consisted of six 200-man companies and was initially commanded by Colonel Sir William Killigrew with Sir Charles Lyttleton as lieutenant-colonel. Killigrew had commanded an English regiment in Dutch service, and many of the regiment's initial complement of officers had served there as well.

The Holland Regiment (later The Buffs) was also raised to serve at sea and both of these "naval" regiments were paid for by the Treasurer of the Navy by Order of Council of 11 July 1665. John Churchill, later the 1st Duke of Marlborough, was a famous member of this regiment. A Company of Foot Guards served as Marines to augment the Marines of the Admiral's Regiment during the key sea battle the Battle of Solebay in 1672. The regiment was disbanded in 1689 shortly after James II was deposed in the Glorious Revolution.

Two marine regiments of the army were raised in 1690. They were the Earl of Pembroke's and Torrington's, later Lord Berkeley's. These two regiments participated in an opposed landing during the Williamite War in Ireland at Cork, Ireland on 21 September 1690 under the command of John Churchill, later Duke of Marlborough.

In 1699 the marine regiments were disbanded, but they were raised again from 1702 to 1713 to fight in the War of the Spanish Succession; their most notable contribution being the capture of Gibraltar in 1704.

=== Early British Empire ===
On 5 April 1755, His Majesty's Marine Forces, fifty companies in three divisions, headquartered at Chatham, Portsmouth, and Plymouth, were formed by Order of Council under Admiralty control. Initially Marine field officer ranks were honorary sinecure positions awarded to senior Royal Navy officers. This meant that the furthest a Marine officer could advance was to lieutenant colonel. It was not until 1771 that the first Marine was promoted to colonel. This attitude persisted well into the 1800s. During the rest of the 18th century, they served in numerous landings all over the world, the most famous being the landing at Belle Île on the Brittany coast in 1761. They also served in the American War of Independence, notably in the Battle of Bunker Hill led by Major John Pitcairn.

Major General John Tupper His Majesty's Marine Forces

In 1788 a detachment of four companies of marines, under Major Robert Ross, accompanied the First Fleet to protect a new colony at Botany Bay (New South Wales). Due to an error the Fleet left Portsmouth without its main supply of ammunition, and were not resupplied until the Fleet docked in Rio de Janeiro midway through the voyage. Some scholars contend that the Marines deliberately spread smallpox among Australia's Indigenous population in order to protect the settlement, but this incident does not appear in contemporaneous Marine or government records and most researchers associate the disease outbreak with other causes.

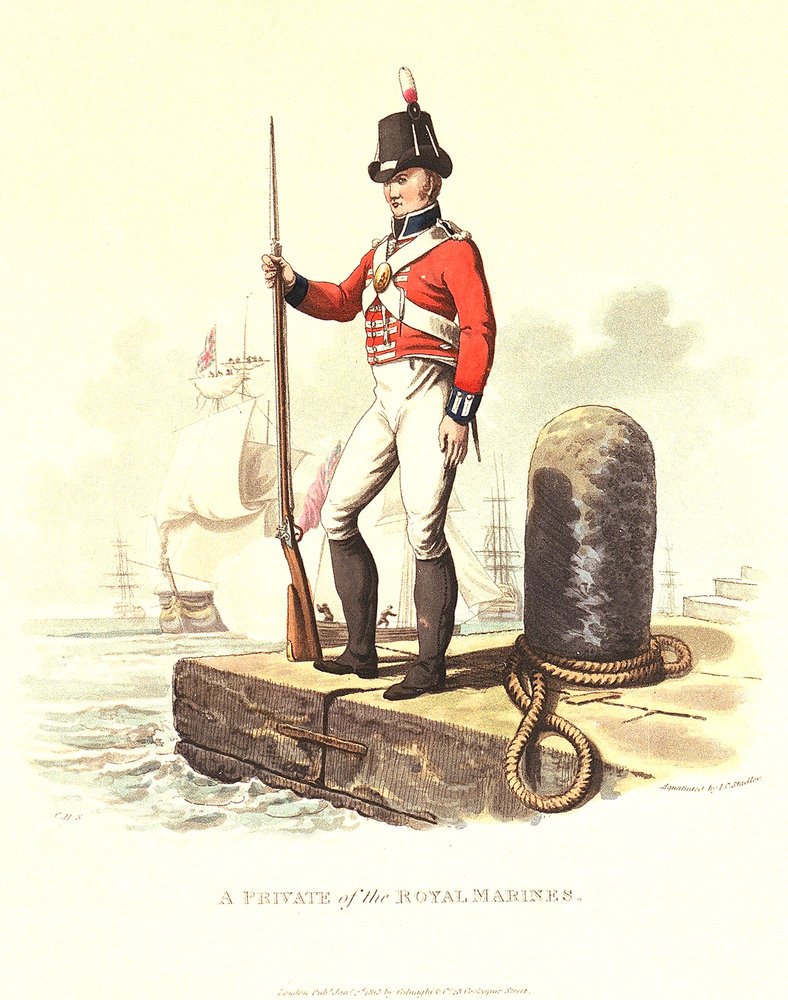
Private of Marines, 1815

In 1802, largely at the instigation of Admiral the Earl St Vincent, they were titled the Royal Marines by King George III. The Royal Marines Artillery (RMA) was formed as a separate unit in 1804 to man the artillery in bomb ketches. These had been manned by the Army's Royal Regiment of Artillery, but a lawsuit by a Royal Artillery officer resulted in a court decision that Army officers were not subject to Naval orders. As RMA uniforms were the blue of the Royal Regiment of Artillery they were nicknamed the "Blue Marines" and the infantry element, who wore the red uniforms of the British infantry, became known as the "Red Marines", often given the semi-derogatory nickname "Lobsters" by sailors. A fourth division of the Royal Marines, headquartered at Woolwich, was formed in 1805.

During the Napoleonic Wars the Royal Marines participated in every notable naval battle on board the Royal Navy's ships and also took part in multiple amphibious actions. Marines had a dual function aboard ships of the Royal Navy in this period; routinely, they ensured the security of the ship's officers and supported their maintenance of discipline in the ship's crew, and in battle, they engaged the enemy's crews, whether firing from positions on their own ship, or fighting in boarding actions. In the Caribbean theatre volunteers from freed French slaves on Marie-Galante were used to form Sir Alexander Cochrane's first Corps of Colonial Marines. These men bolstered the ranks, helping the British to hold the island until reinforcements arrived. This practice was repeated during the War of 1812, where escaped American slaves were formed into Cochrane's second Corps of Colonial Marines. These men were commanded by Royal Marines officers and fought alongside their regular Royal Marines counterparts at the Battle of Bladensburg. Throughout the war Royal Marines units raided up and down the east coast of America including up the Penobscot River and in the Chesapeake Bay. They fought in the Battle of New Orleans and later helped capture Fort Bowyer in Mobile Bay in what was the last action of the war.

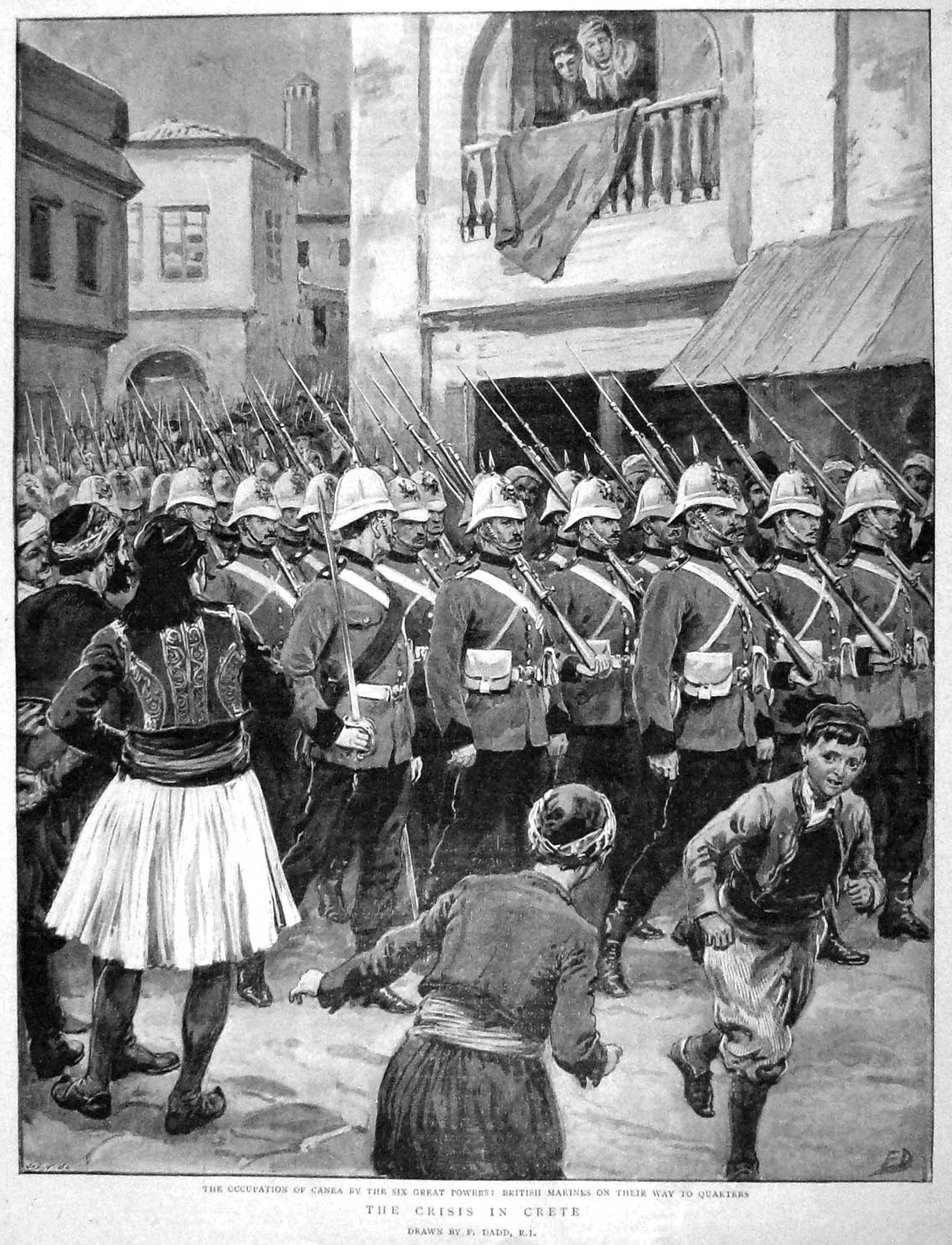
Royal Marines march through the streets of Chania, Crete, in spring 1897, as part of the British occupation during the Greco-Turkish War

In 1855 the infantry forces were renamed the Royal Marines Light Infantry (RMLI). During the Crimean War in 1854 and 1855, three Royal Marines earned the Victoria Cross, two in the Crimea and one in the Baltic. In 1862 the name was slightly altered to "Royal Marine Light Infantry". The Royal Navy did not fight any other ships after 1850 and became interested in landings by Naval Brigades. In these Naval Brigades, the function of the Royal Marines was to land first and act as skirmishers ahead of the sailor infantry and artillery. This skirmishing was the traditional function of light infantry. For most of their history, British Marines had been organised as fusiliers. In the rest of the 19th Century the Royal Marines served in many landings especially in the First and Second Opium Wars (1839–1842 and 1856–1860) against the Chinese. These were all successful except for the landing at the Mouth of the Peiho in 1859, where Admiral Sir James Hope ordered a landing across extensive mud flats.

The Royal Marines also played a prominent role in the Boxer Rebellion in China (1900), where a Royal Marine earned a Victoria Cross.

=== Status and roles ===
Through much of the 18th and 19th centuries Marine officers had a lower standing status than their counterparts in the Royal Navy. A short-lived effort was made in 1907, through the common entry or "Selborne scheme", to reduce the professional differences between RN and RM officers through a system of common entry that provided for an initial period of shared training.

By the early twentieth century the Royal Marines had achieved a high professional status, although there was a serious shortage of junior officers. Numbering about 15,000 during the Edwardian era, enlistment for other ranks was for at least 12 years, with entitlement to a pension after 21 years of service. After basic training new recruits were assigned to one of three land-based divisions and from there to warships as vacancies arose. From 1908 onwards one gun turret on each battleship was manned by RMA gunners. The RMLI continued their traditional role of providing landing parties and shore-based detachments. Specialist positions on board ship, such as postmen, barbers, lamp trimmers and butchers, were reserved for Royal Marines. After 1903 the Royal Marines provided bands for service on board battleships and other large vessels.

=== World wars ===
==== First World War ====
During the First World War, in addition to their usual stations aboard ship, Royal Marines were part of the Royal Naval Division which landed in Belgium in 1914 to help defend Antwerp and later took part in the amphibious landing at Gallipoli in 1915. It also served on the Western Front. The Division's first two commanders were Royal Marine Artillery Generals. Other Royal Marines acted as landing parties in the Naval campaign against the Turkish fortifications in the Dardanelles before the Gallipoli landing. They were sent ashore to assess damage to Turkish fortifications after bombardment by British and French ships and, if necessary, to complete their destruction. The Royal Marines were the last to leave Gallipoli, replacing both British and French troops in a neatly planned and executed withdrawal from the beaches.

The Royal Marines also took part in the Zeebrugge Raid in 1918. Five Royal Marines earned the Victoria Cross in the First World War, two at Zeebrugge, one at Gallipoli, one at Jutland and one on the Western Front.

==== Between the wars ====
After the war Royal Marines took part in the allied intervention in Russia. In 1919, the 6th Battalion RMLI mutinied and was disbanded at Murmansk. The Royal Marine Artillery (RMA) and Royal Marine Light Infantry (RMLI) were amalgamated on 22 June 1923. Post-war demobilisation had seen the Royal Marines reduced from 55,000 (1918) to 15,000 in 1922 and there was Treasury pressure for a further reduction to 6,000 or even the entire disbandment of the Corps. As a compromise an establishment of 9,500 was settled upon but this meant that two separate branches could no longer be maintained. The abandonment of the Marine's artillery role meant that the Corps would subsequently have to rely on Royal Artillery support when ashore, that the title of Royal Marines would apply to the entire Corps and that only a few specialists would now receive gunnery training. As a form of consolation the dark blue and red uniform of the Royal Marine Artillery now became the full dress of the entire Corps. Royal Marine officers and SNCO's however continue to wear the historic scarlet in mess dress to the present day. The ranks of private, used by the RMLI, and gunner, used by the RMA, were abolished and replaced by the rank of Marine.

==== Second World War ====
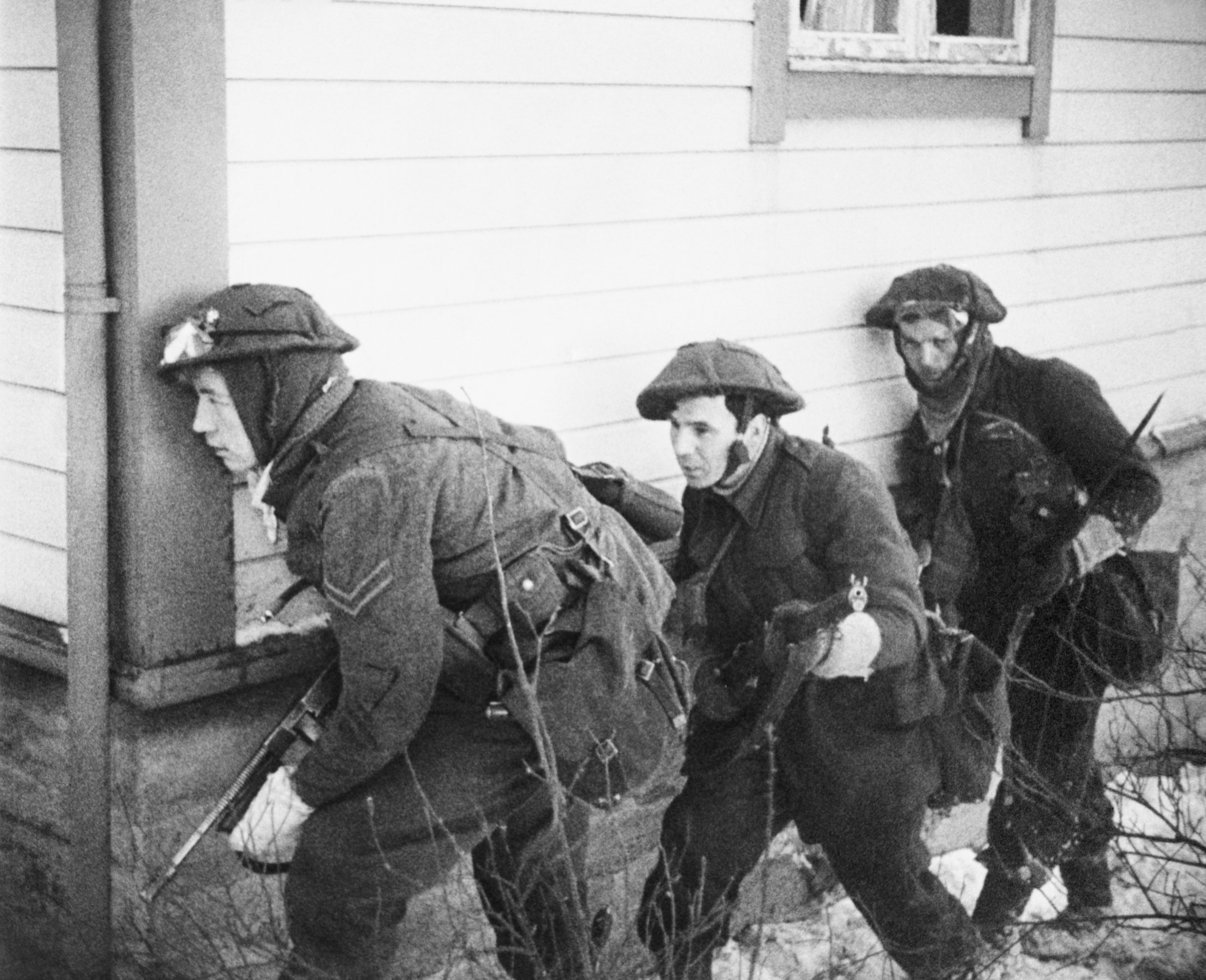
British Commandos in action during Operation Archery, Norway

During the Second World War, a small party of Royal Marines were first ashore at Namsos in April 1940, seizing the approaches to the Norwegian town preparatory to a landing by the British Army two days later. The Royal Marines formed the Royal Marine Division as an amphibiously trained division, parts of which served at Dakar and in the capture of Madagascar. After the assault on the French naval base at Antsirane in Madagascar was held up, fifty Sea Service Royal Marines from HMS Ramillies commanded by Captain Martin Price were landed on the quay of the base by the destroyer HMS Anthony after it ran the gauntlet of French shore batteries defending Diego Suarez Bay. They then captured two of the batteries, which led to a quick surrender by the French.

In addition the Royal Marines formed Mobile Naval Base Defence Organisations (MNBDOs) similar to the United States Marine Corps Defense Battalions. One of these took part in the defence of Crete. Royal Marines also served in Malaya and in Singapore, where due to losses they were joined with remnants of the 2nd Battalion of Argyll and Sutherland Highlanders at Tyersall Park to form the "Plymouth Argylls". The Royal Marines formed one Commando (A Commando) which served at Dieppe. One month after Dieppe, most of the 11th Royal Marine Battalion was killed or captured in an ill staged amphibious landing at Tobruk in Operation Agreement. Again, the Marines were involved with the Argyll and Sutherland Highlanders, this time the 1st Battalion. In 1942 the Infantry Battalions of the Royal Marine Division were re-organised as Commandos, joining the British Army Commandos. The Division command structure became a Special Service Brigade command. The support troops became landing craft crew and saw extensive action on D-Day in June 1944.

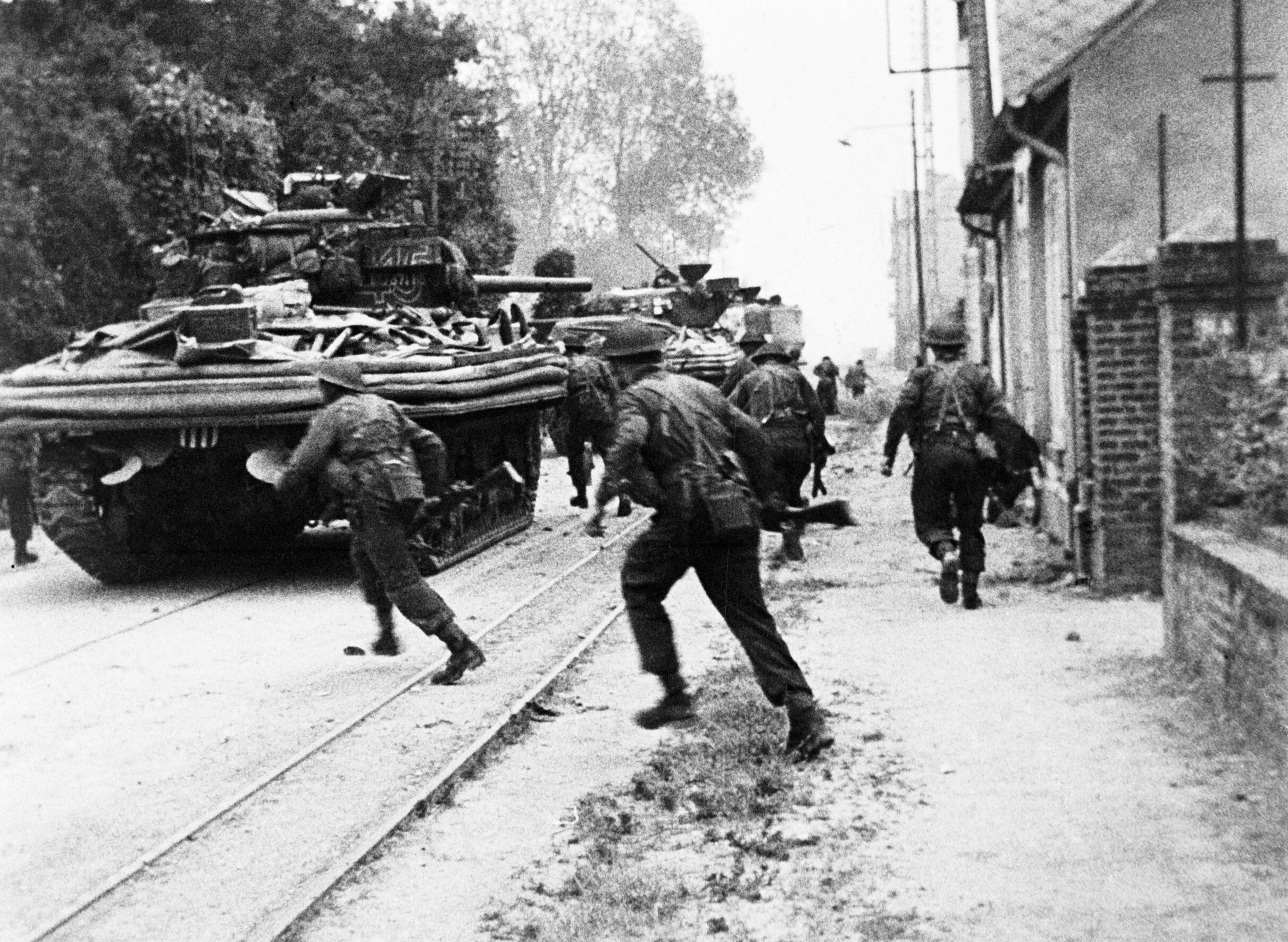
Men of 4 (Army) Commando engaged in house to house fighting with the Germans at Riva Bella, near Ouistreham

A total of four Special Service Brigades (redesignated Commando brigades in December 1944 as the "SS" abbreviation was unpopular) were raised during the war, and Royal Marines were represented in all of them. A total of nine RM Commandos were raised during the war, numbered from 40 to 48. These were distributed as follows:

- 1 Commando Brigade
  - 45 (RM) Commando
- 2 Commando Brigade
  - 40 (RM) Commando
  - 43 (RM) Commando
- 3 Commando Brigade
  - 42 (RM) Commando
  - 44 (RM) Commando
- 4 Commando Brigade (entirely Royal Marine after March 1944)
  - 41 (RM) Commando
  - 46 (RM) Commando
  - 47 (RM) Commando
  - 48 (RM) Commando

1 Commando Brigade took part in first in the Tunisia Campaign and then assaults on Sicily and Normandy, campaigns in the Rhineland and crossing the Rhine. 2 Commando Brigade was involved in the Salerno landings, Anzio, Comacchio, and operations in the Argenta Gap. 3 Commando Brigade served in Sicily and Burma. 4 Commando Brigade served in the Battle of Normandy and in the Battle of the Scheldt on the island of Walcheren during the clearing of Antwerp.

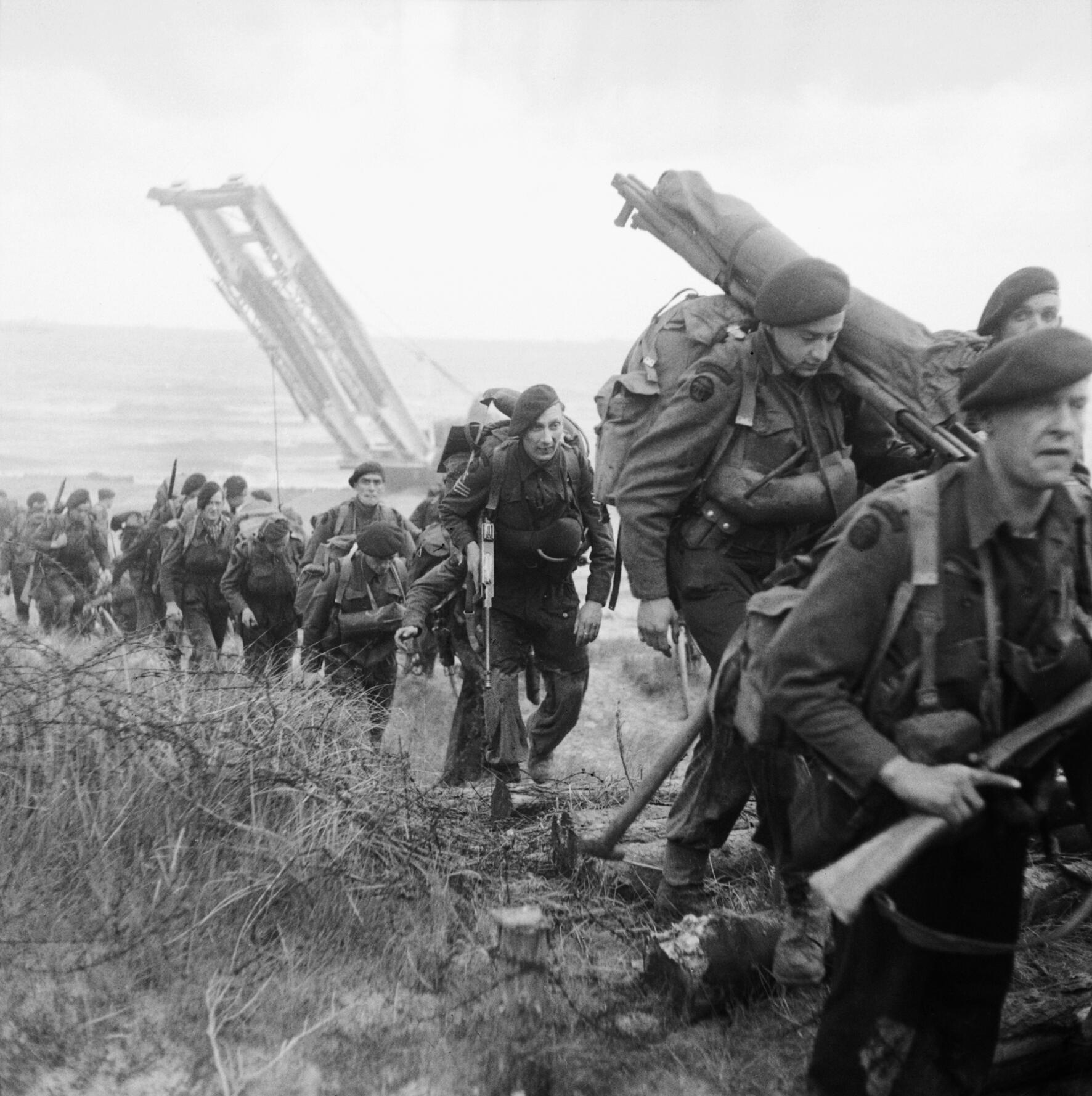
Royal Marine Commandos attached to 3rd Division move inland from Sword Beach on the Normandy coast, 6 June 1944

In January 1945, two further RM Brigades were formed, 116th Brigade and 117th Brigade. Both were conventional Infantry, rather than in the Commando role. 116th Brigade saw some action in the Netherlands, but 117th Brigade was hardly used operationally. In addition one Landing Craft Assault (LCA) unit was stationed in Australia late in the war as a training unit. In 1946 the Army Commandos were disbanded, leaving the Royal Marines to continue the Commando role (with supporting Army elements). A number of Royal Marines served as pilots during the Second World War. It was a Royal Marines officer who led the attack by a formation of Blackburn Skuas that sank the Königsberg. Eighteen Royal Marines commanded Fleet Air Arm squadrons during the course of the war, and with the formation of the British Pacific Fleet were well represented in the final drive on Japan. Captains and Majors generally commanded squadrons, whilst in one case Lt Colonel R.C. Hay on HMS Indefatigable was Air Group Co-ordinator from HMS Victorious of the entire British Pacific Fleet.

Throughout the war Royal Marines continued in their traditional role of providing ships detachments and manning a proportion of the guns on Cruisers and Capital Ships. They also provided the crew for the UK's Minor Landing craft, and the Royal Marines Armoured Support Group manned Centaur IV tanks on D Day; one of these is still on display at Pegasus Bridge.

Only one marine (Corporal Thomas Peck Hunter of 43 Commando) was awarded the Victoria Cross in the Second World War for action at Lake Comacchio in Italy. Hunter was the most recent RM Commando to be awarded the medal. The Royal Marines Boom Patrol Detachment under Blondie Haslar carried out Operation Frankton and provided the basis for the post-war continuation of the SBS.

=== Post-colonial era ===
The Royal Marines underwent a notable change after 1945 however, when the Royal Marines took on the main responsibility for the role and training of the British Commandos. As of 2009, since their creation in 1942 Royal Marines Commandos had engaged on active operations across the globe, every year except 1968. Notably they provided the first military unit to perform an air assault insertion by helicopter, during the Suez Crisis in 1956. They were also part of the land element during the 1982 Falklands War.

43 Commando was active as amphibious infantry from 1961 to 1968, and 41 Commando was disbanded in 1981.

=== After 1945 and the Cold War ===
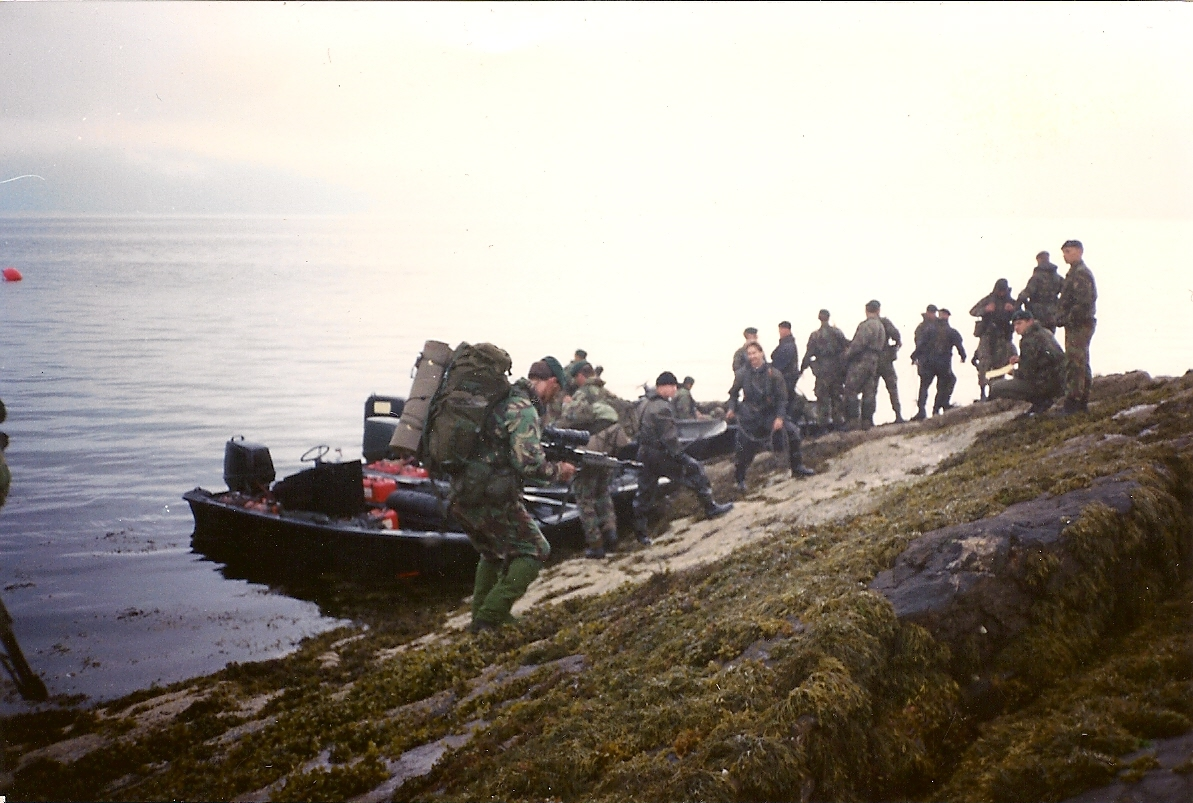
Royal Marines during an exercise in Scotland

In 1946 the Army Commandos were disbanded, leaving the Royal Marines to continue the commando role (with supporting army elements). During the Cold War the Royal Marines were earmarked to reinforce NATO's northernmost command Allied Forces North Norway. Therefore, 3 Commando Brigade began to train annually in Northern Norway and had large stores of vehicles and supplies pre-positioned there. At the end of the Cold War in 1989 the structure of the Royal Marines was as follows:

- Commandant General Royal Marines, London
  - 3 Commando Brigade, Plymouth
    - 40 Commando, Taunton
    - 42 Commando, Bickleigh
    - 45 Commando, Arbroath
    - 29 Commando Regiment, Royal Artillery, Plymouth, one battery in Arbroath, (18× L118 light guns)
    - 4 Assault Squadron, Plymouth (4× LCU Mk.9, 4× LCVP Mk.4, 2× Centurion BARV), served aboard HMS Fearless (L10)
    - 539 Assault Squadron, Plymouth (4× LCU Mk.9, 4× LCVP Mk.4, 2× Centurion BARV), served aboard HMS Intrepid (L11)
    - 59 Independent Commando Squadron, Royal Engineers, Plymouth, one troop in Arbroath
    - 3 Commando Brigade Air Squadron, RNAS Yeovilton, (12× Gazelle AH.1, 6× Lynx AH.1)
    - 2 Raiding Squadron, Royal Marines Reserve, Plymouth
    - 131 Independent Commando Squadron, Royal Engineers (V), Kingsbury, London
    - 289 Commando Battery, Royal Artillery (V), East Ham (6× L118 light guns)
  - Special Boat Service, Poole, under operational control of United Kingdom Special Forces
  - Comacchio Group, HMNB Clyde, guarded HMNB Clyde and the UK's naval nuclear weapons stored at RNAD Coulport
  - Royal Marines Police, Plymouth
  - Commando Training Centre Royal Marines, Lympstone
  - Royal Marines Band Service RMSoM, Deal
  - Royal Marines Reserve
    - RMR Plymouth, Plymouth
    - RMR Bristol, Bristol
    - RMR London, Wandsworth
    - RMR Merseyside, Liverpool
    - RMR Scotland, Edinburgh
    - RMR Tyne, Newcastle

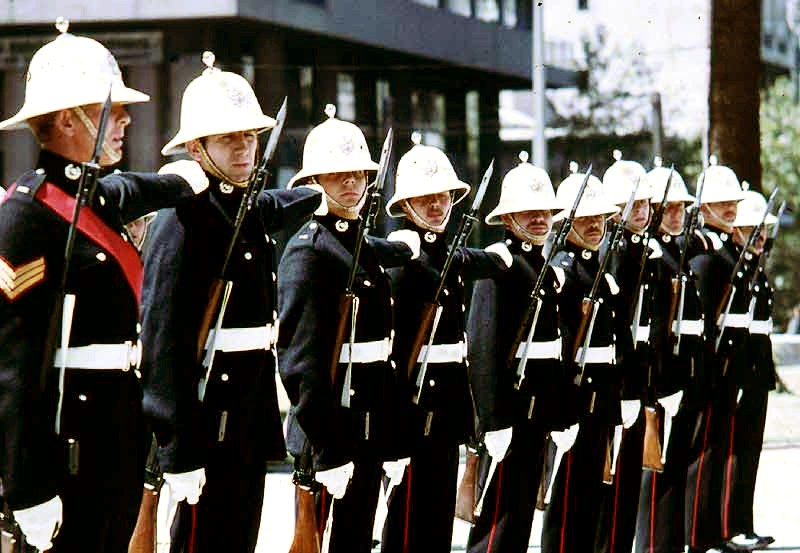
Royal Marines in 1972

Royal Marines personnel were involved in the Korean War. 41 (Independent) Commando was reformed in 1950 and was initially envisaged as a raiding force for operations against North Korea. It carried out this role in partnership with the United States Navy until after the landing of United States Army X Corps at Wonsan. It subsequently joined the 1st Marine Division at Koto-ri. As Task Force Drysdale, under the command of Lieutenant Colonel D. B. Drysdale RM, 41 Commando, a USMC company, a US Army company, and part of the divisional train fought their way from Koto-ri to Hagaru-ri after Chinese forces blocked the road to the north. The force then took part in the withdrawal from the Chosin Reservoir. Thereafter, a limited amount of raiding followed before the Marines were withdrawn from the conflict in 1951. The Commando received the Presidential Citation after the USMC amended its regulations to permit foreign units to receive the award.

After participating in the long-running Malayan Emergency, the next major action came in 1956 during the Suez Crisis. Headquarters 3 Commando Brigade, together with Nos. 40, 42 and 45 Commandos, took part in the operation. It marked the first operational use of a helicopter assault to land troops during an amphibious attack. British and French forces defeated the Egyptians militarily, but pressure from the United States and domestic political pressure in France forced their withdrawal.

In September 1955, 45 Commando was deployed to Cyprus to conduct counter-insurgency operations against the EOKA guerrillas during the Cypriot independence struggle against British rule. EOKA was a small but highly effective organisation of Greek Cypriots with considerable local support from the Greek Cypriot community. The unit, then based in Malta, deployed to the Kyrenia Mountains area of the island and, in December 1955, launched Operation Foxhunter, an operation intended to destroy EOKA's principal base.

Further action in the Far East occurred during the Indonesia–Malaysia confrontation. Nos. 40 and 42 Commandos deployed to Borneo at various times to prevent Indonesian forces from escalating tensions in the neighbouring region, against the backdrop of wider conflicts in Cambodia, Laos, and Vietnam. During the campaign, Lima Company of 42 Commando carried out a company-strength amphibious assault on the town of Limbang to rescue hostages. The Limbang raid resulted in three of the 150 Marines involved receiving decorations, and L Company, 42 Commando, is still referred to as "Limbang Company" in commemoration of the operation.

In January 1964, part of the Tanzanian Army mutinied. Within 24 hours, elements of 41 Commando had departed Bickleigh Camp, Plymouth, Devon, and were flown to Nairobi, Kenya, before continuing by road into Tanzania. At the same time, Commandos aboard HMS Bulwark sailed to East Africa and anchored offshore from Dar es Salaam. The mutiny was suppressed, and the following six months were spent touring Tanzanian military outposts and disarming military personnel.

From 1969 onwards, Royal Marine units regularly deployed to Northern Ireland during The Troubles, during which 13 personnel were killed in action. A further 11 died in the Deal barracks bombing at the Royal Marines School of Music in 1989. Between 1974 and 1984, the Royal Marines undertook three United Nations tours of duty in Cyprus. The first began in November 1974, when 41 Commando took over responsibility for the Limassol district from the 2nd Battalion of the Guards Brigade following the Turkish invasion of Cyprus, becoming the first Commando unit to wear the UN's light blue berets during the Corps' first six-month tour with the United Nations Peacekeeping Force in Cyprus (UNFICYP).

The Falklands War formed the backdrop to the next major action involving the Royal Marines. Argentina invaded the islands in April 1982, prompting the immediate dispatch of a British task force to retake them. As an amphibious assault was required, the Royal Marines played a central role in the campaign. 3 Commando Brigade was brought up to full combat strength with the addition of the 2nd and 3rd Battalions of the Parachute Regiment alongside 40, 42 and 45 Commandos. Troops landed at San Carlos Water on the western side of East Falkland and subsequently "yomped" across the island towards the capital, Stanley, which surrendered on 14 June 1982 to the 2nd Battalion, Parachute Regiment. A Royal Marines divisional headquarters, under Major-General Jeremy Moore, was deployed, with Moore serving as commander of British land forces during the conflict.

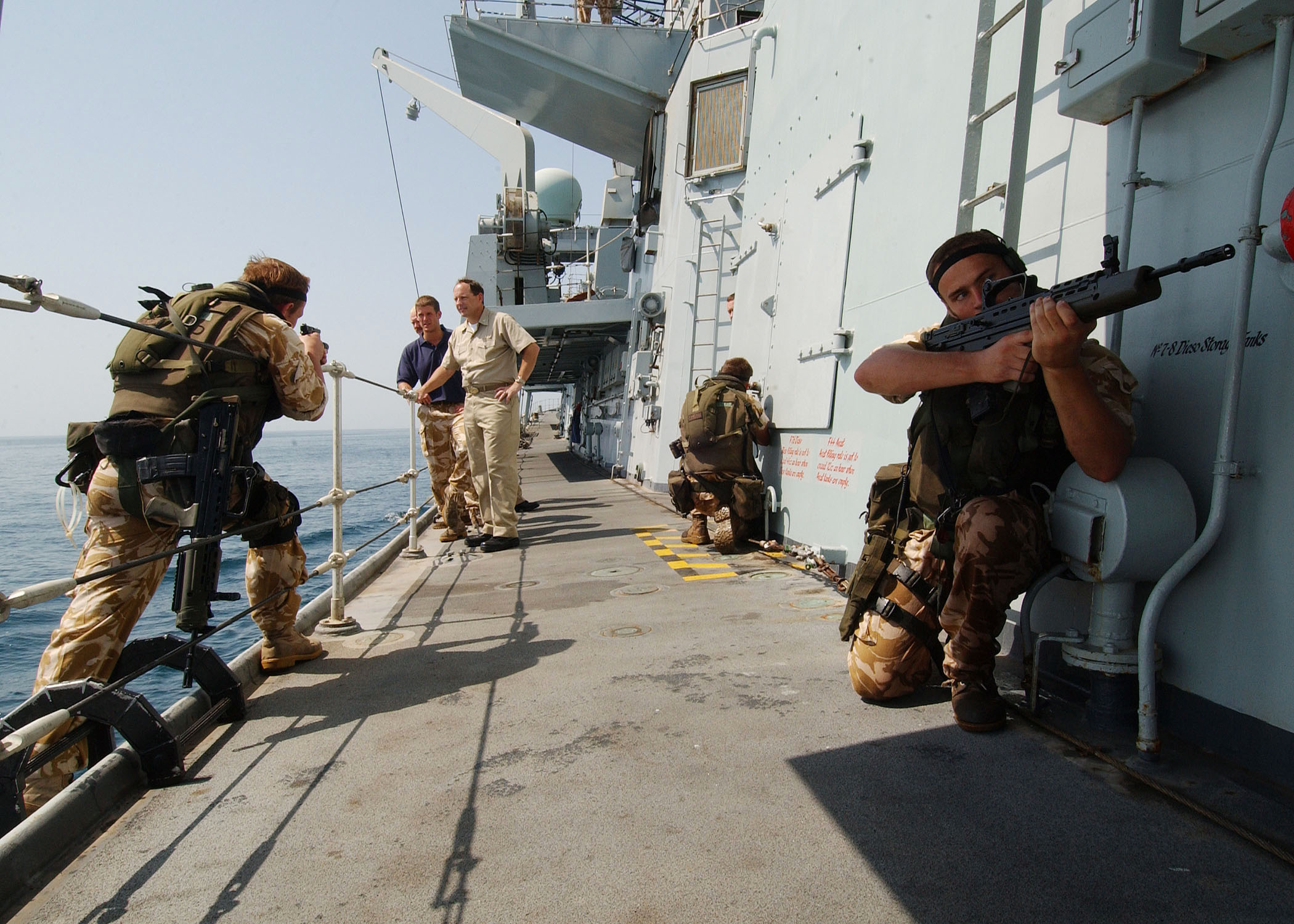
Boarding procedures demonstrated by Royal Marines aboard the frigate HMS Somerset in the Persian Gulf in 2004

The main element of 3 Commando Brigade was not deployed during the 1991 Gulf War. However, 24 men from K Company, 42 Commando Royal Marines, were deployed in six-man teams aboard two Royal Navy destroyers and frigates. They served as ship boarding parties and took part in numerous boardings of suspect vessels. Additional elements were deployed to provide protection for shipping in ports throughout the Gulf. The main element of 3 Commando Brigade was subsequently deployed to northern Iraq to provide aid to Iraqi Kurds as part of Operation Safe Haven.

In 1992, recruitment into the RM Band Service was opened to women. From 2000 onwards, the Royal Marines began transitioning from their traditional light infantry role with the introduction of the Commando 21 concept. Increased emphasis on force protection led to the introduction of the Viking, the first armoured vehicle operated by the Royal Marines in half a century.

Amid growing concerns about hate crime, terrorism, and attacks targeting Jewish communities in the UK, former Royal Marines were hired to help protect synagogues and Jewish schools. These measures followed incidents including the Golders Green stabbing and arson attacks on Hatzola emergency service vehicles. The use of former Royal Marines for this role is an exceptional arrangement rather than a standard one, as ordinary security guards or volunteers are routinely employed to guard community sites.

Note: "(V)" denoted British Army reserve units.

== Current status and deployment ==
=== Personnel ===
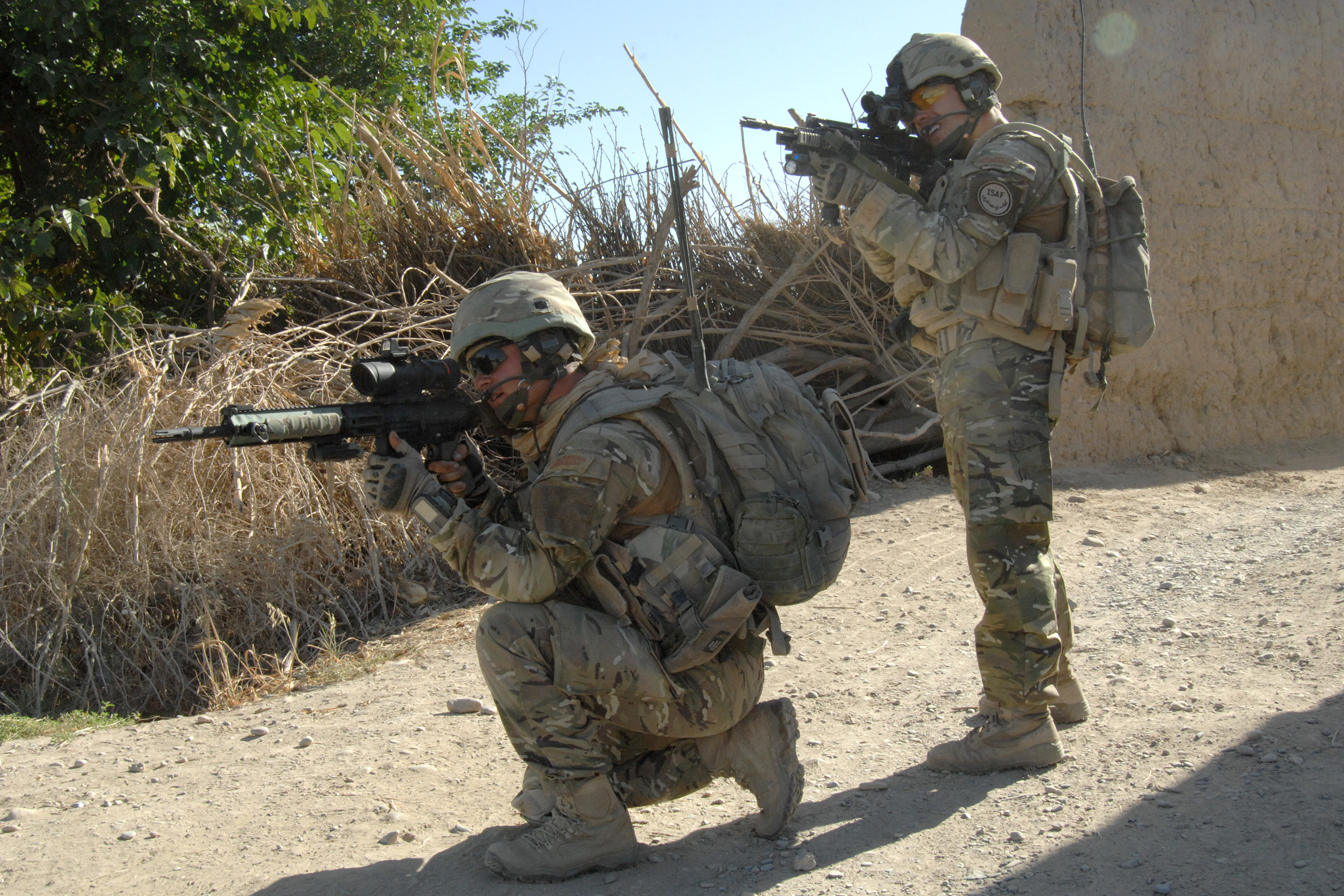
Royal Marines in Sangin, Afghanistan, 2010

The Royal Marines form part of His Majesty's Naval Service, alongside the Royal Navy and the Royal Fleet Auxiliary, and are under the full command of the Fleet Commander. Despite this, the Royal Marines use the same rank structure as the British Army. Uniquely within the British armed forces, officers and other ranks undertake initial, commando, and specialist training together at the Commando Training Centre Royal Marines (CTCRM).

On average, 26,000 people apply to join the Royal Marines Commandos each year, although only around 400 complete training successfully.

Number of Royal Marines personnel, 2000–2022 inclusive.

At their wartime peak in 1944 during the Second World War, more than 70,000 men served in the Royal Marines. Following the Allied victory, the Corps was rapidly reduced to a post-war strength of 13,000 personnel. When National Service ended in 1960, the Marines were reduced again, this time to an all-Commando-trained force of 9,000 personnel. As of 1 January 2021, the Royal Marines had a strength of 5,968 regular personnel and a combined strength of approximately 6,500 including reserves. The Royal Marines are also the only British force element capable of conducting amphibious operations at brigade level.

=== Equipment ===
==== Light weapons ====
The primary general-use rifle of the Future Commando Force is the KS-1 (L403). Specialist commando units also use the Sig Sauer MCX. However, the 5.56 mm L85A2 rifle remains in service with other Royal Marines personnel, sometimes fitted with the L123A3 underslung grenade launcher. Support fire is provided by the L7A2 General Purpose Machine Gun (GPMG).

The Royal Marines' sniper weapon of choice is the bolt-action Accuracy International L96, chambered in .338 Lapua Magnum. The L129A2 is in service as the designated marksman rifle. Other weapons include the Javelin anti-tank guided missile, the NLAW disposable anti-tank missile, the L131A1 pistol, and the Fairbairn–Sykes fighting knife.

==== Vehicles ====
The Royal Marines maintain no heavy armoured units, however, they operate a fleet of lightly armoured and highly mobile vehicles intended for amphibious landings or rapid deployment. The primary armoured fighting vehicle operated by the Viking Squadron is the BvS 10 Viking All Terrain Armoured Vehicle. Other, lighter vehicles include the Land Rover Wolf, and the Jackal 2 (MWMIK) protected patrol vehicle.

==== Artillery ====
Field artillery support is provided by 29th Commando Regiment Royal Artillery of the British Army using the L118 Light Gun, a 105 mm towed howitzer. The regiment is Commando-trained.

==== Aviation ====
The Commando Helicopter Force of the Fleet Air Arm provides transport helicopters in support of the Royal Marines. It currently uses both Merlin HC4/4A medium-lift transport and Wildcat AH1 light transport/reconnaissance helicopters to provide direct aviation support for the Corps. In addition, the Royal Air Force provides Chinook heavy-lift and Puma HC2 medium-lift transport helicopters, and the British Army provides Apache AH-64E attack helicopter gunship support.

==== Vessels ====
The Royal Marines operate a varied fleet of military watercraft designed to transport troops and materiel from ship to shore or conduct river or estuary patrols. These include the Mk10 Landing Craft Utility and the Mk5b Landing Craft Vehicle Personnel, and the BAE Fast Interceptor Craft and MK 11 Shallow Water Combat Submersible used by the Special Boat Service. Other smaller amphibious craft such as the Offshore Raiding Craft, Rigid Raider and Inflatable Raiding Craft are in service in much greater numbers.

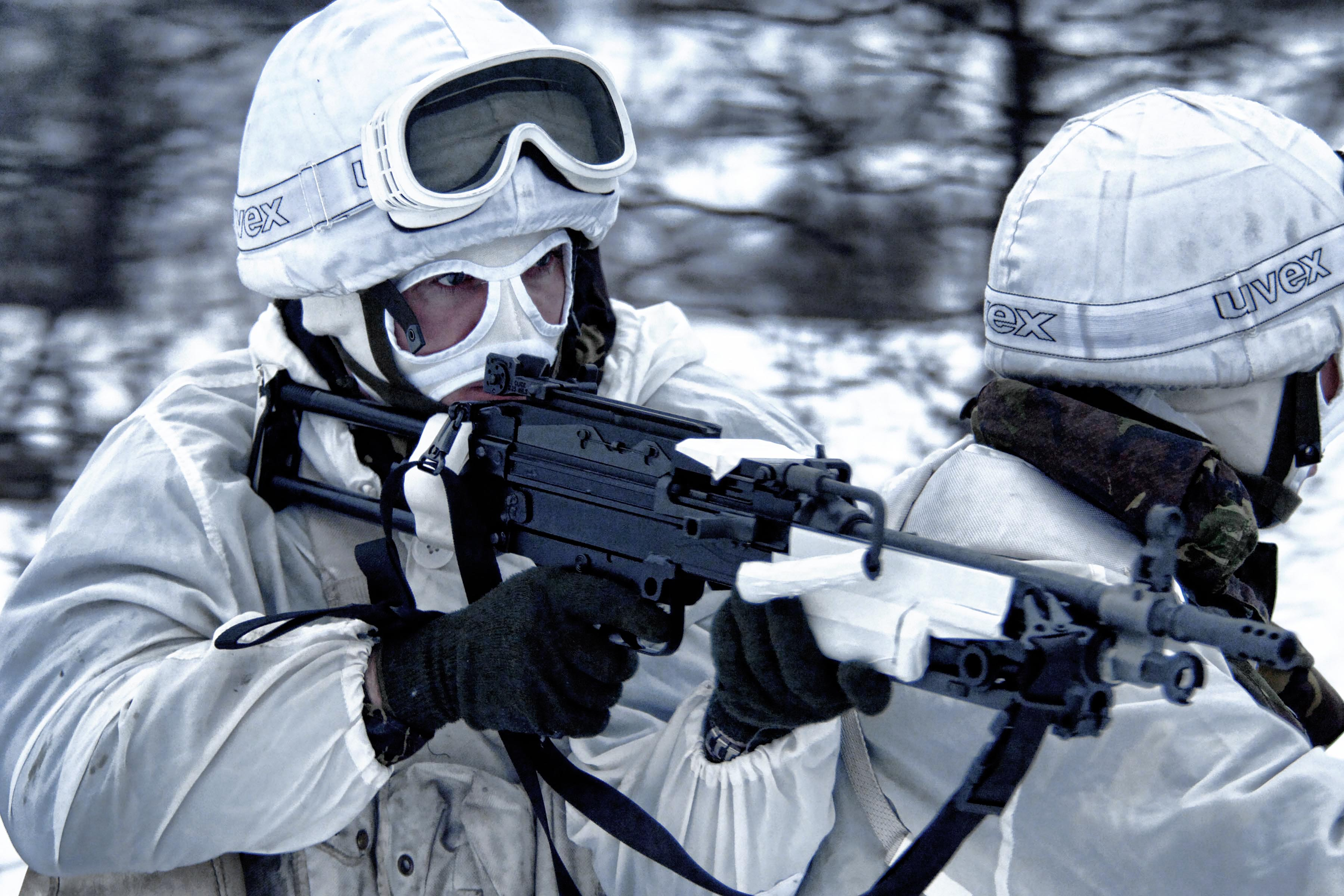
Royal Marines equipped for Arctic warfare during an exercise in Norway

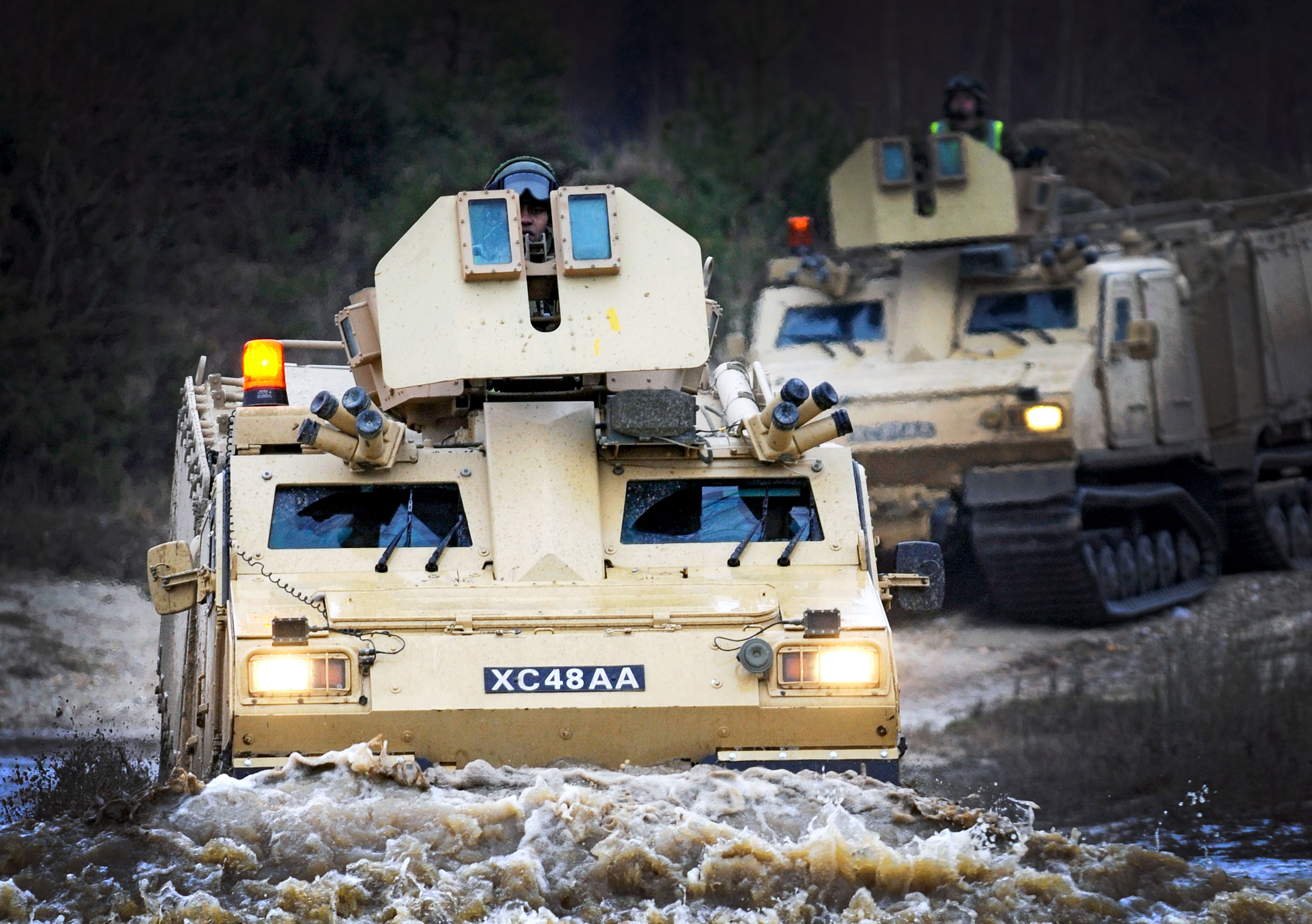
BvS 10 Vikings of the Viking Squadron on exercise

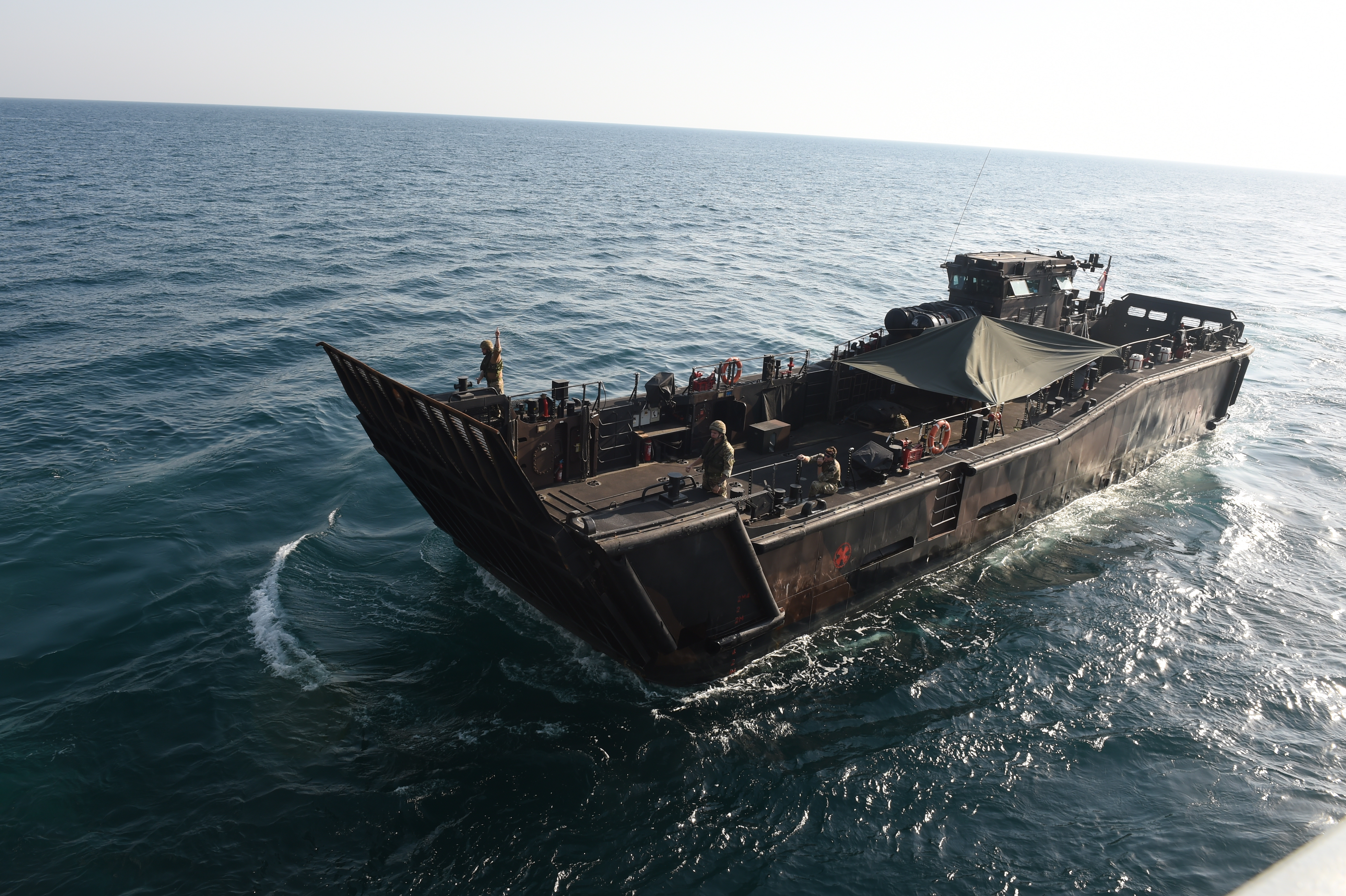
Royal Marines Landing Craft Utility (LCU) Mk10

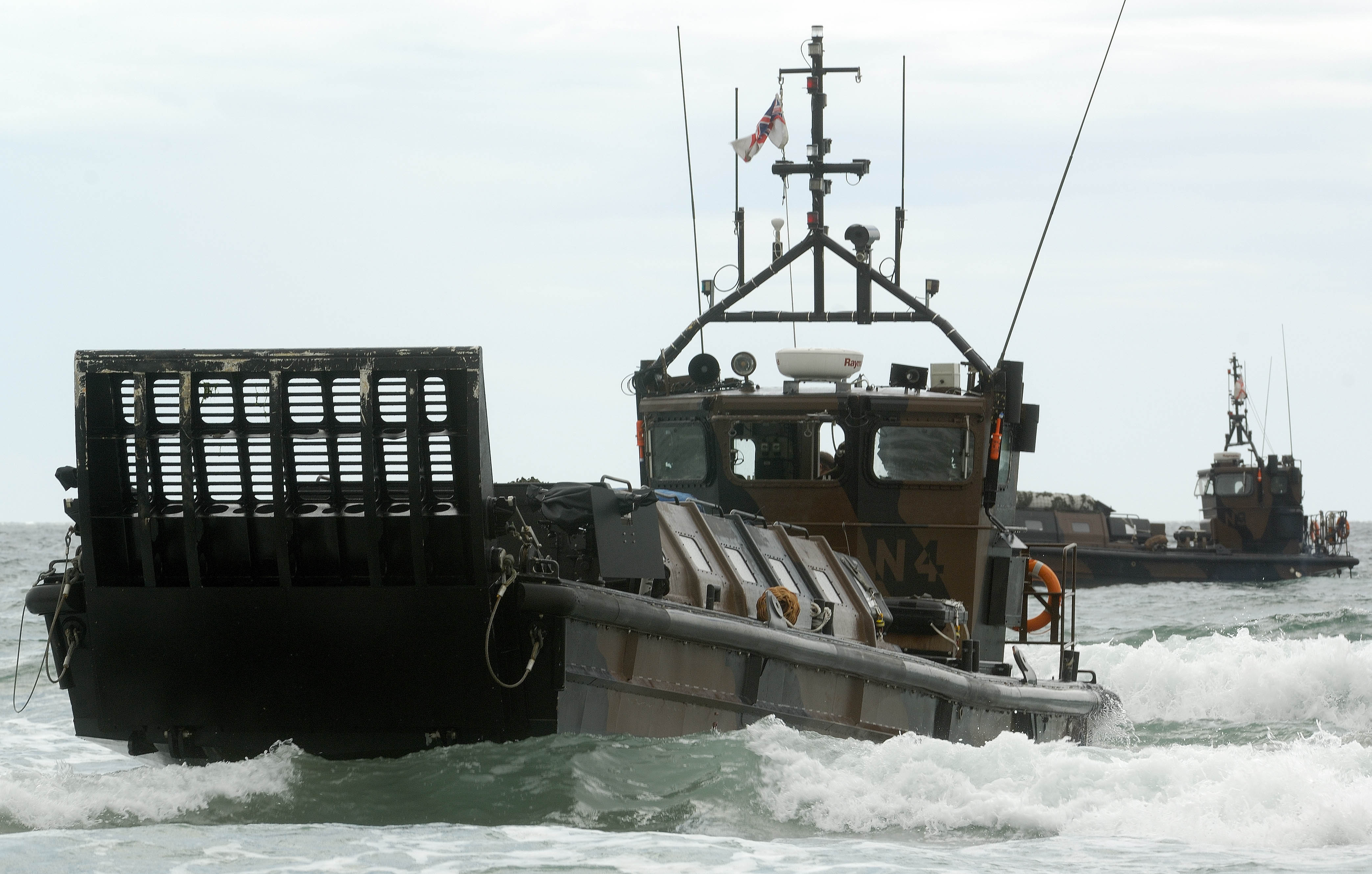
A Royal Marines Landing Craft Vehicle Personnel (LCVP) Mk5

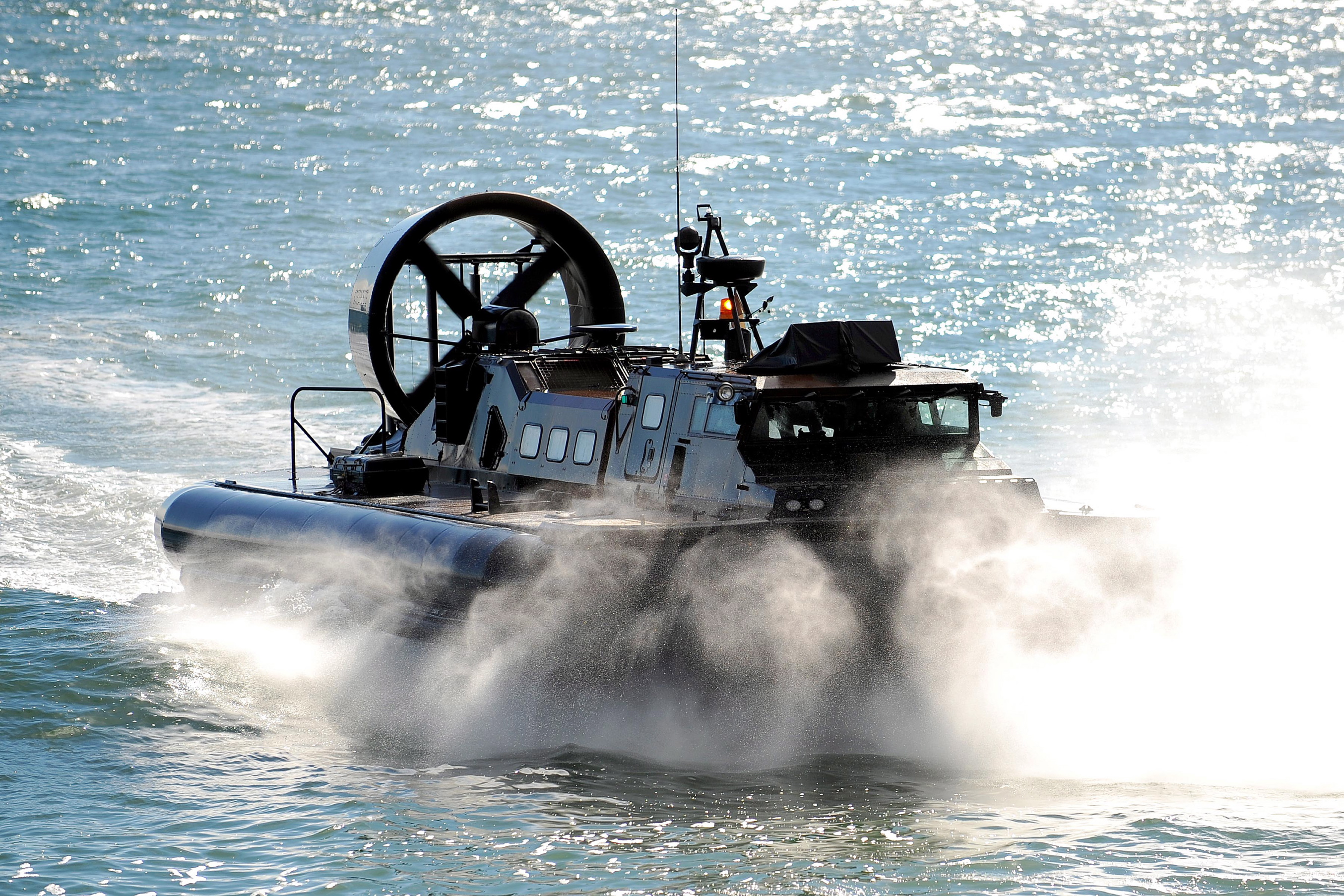
Royal Marines Landing Craft Air Cushion (LCAC)

== Organisation ==
=== Command structure ===
The overall head of the Royal Marines is King Charles III, in his role as Commander-in-Chief of the British Armed Forces. The ceremonial head of the Royal Marines is the Captain General Royal Marines. In October 2022 King Charles was announced as the new Captain General on the occasion of the 358th anniversary of the foundation of the corps. Full Command of the Royal Marines is vested in the Fleet Commander (FLTCDR).

The operational capability of the corps comprises a number of battalion-plus sized units, of which seven are designated as "commandos":

- Commando Units
  - 40 Commando (known as Forty Commando) based at RM Norton Manor, Taunton, Somerset, England
  - 45 Commando (known as Four Five Commando) based at RM Condor, Arbroath, Angus, Scotland
- Maritime Security
  - 42 Commando (known as Four Two Commando) based at RM Bickleigh, Plymouth, Devon, England
- Nuclear Deterrent Protection
  - 43 Commando Fleet Protection Group based at HM Naval Base Clyde, Faslane, Argyll and Bute.
    - Command and Logistics Squadron
    - O Squadrons tasked with specializing in nuclear security within the HMNB Clyde port area and, if required, elsewhere
    - P Squadrons tasked with specializing in nuclear security within the HMNB Clyde port area and, if required, elsewhere
    - R Squadrons tasked with ensuring the security of nuclear materials during transit—whether by land or by sea—throughout the United Kingdom.
- Intelligence, Surveillance and Target Acquisition
  - 30 Commando Information Exploitation Group based at Stonehouse Barracks, Plymouth
    - Headquarters Squadron
      - Intelligence and Information Activities Cells
    - Surveillance and Reconnaissance Squadron (SRS)
      - Brigade Patrol Troop
    - Y Squadron
      - Air Defence Troop
    - Communications Squadron
    - Logistics Squadron
      - Royal Marines Police Troop
    - Base Squadron
- Raiding
  - 47 Commando (Raiding Group) based at RM Tamar, Devonport (previously 1 Assault Group RM)
- Logistic Support
  - 48 Commando Support Group based at RM Chivenor, Devon (previously Commando Logistics Regiment)
    - HQ & Training Squadron Responsible for managing communications and the operation of ground mobility fleets, as well as overseeing all core training—including medical and ground mobility instruction—for the UKCF.
    - Viking Squadron is an element of the Royal Marines that operates the Viking BvS 10 All Terrain Vehicle. It is based at Stanley Barracks, Bovington Garrison in Dorset.
    - Commando Forces Support Squadron tasked with handling garrison security, support, and infrastructure services for 48 Commando
    - Delta Squadron tasked with providing tactical transport capabilities and the distribution of supplies to maintain operational tempo.
    - Workshop Squadron tasked with providing vital first-line equipment support to 48 Commando, as well as second-line equipment support to UK Commando Forces—encompassing the maintenance of vehicles, weaponry, radio equipment, and electrical generators.
    - Victor Squadron Responsible for providing critical operational support regarding supplies and petroleum products—encompassing the storage and distribution of fuel—as well as the management of technical materiel for 48 Commando and the UK Commando Force.
    - Medical Squadron tasked with providing comprehensive medical support to the UKCF, including pre-hospital care, primary healthcare led by general practitioners, and resuscitation/damage-control surgery

With the exception of 43 Commando Fleet Protection Group and the 48 Commando Support Group, which are each commanded by a full colonel, each of these units is commanded by a lieutenant-colonel of the Royal Marines, who may have sub-specialised in a number of ways throughout their career.

=== UK Commando Force ===
Operational command of the five commandos and the 48 Commando Support Group is delegated to UK Commando Force. Based at Stonehouse Barracks, this headquarters exercises control as directed by either CINCFLEET or the Permanent Joint Headquarters.

=== Other elements ===
The other elements of the Royal Marines outside of the UK Commando Force are:

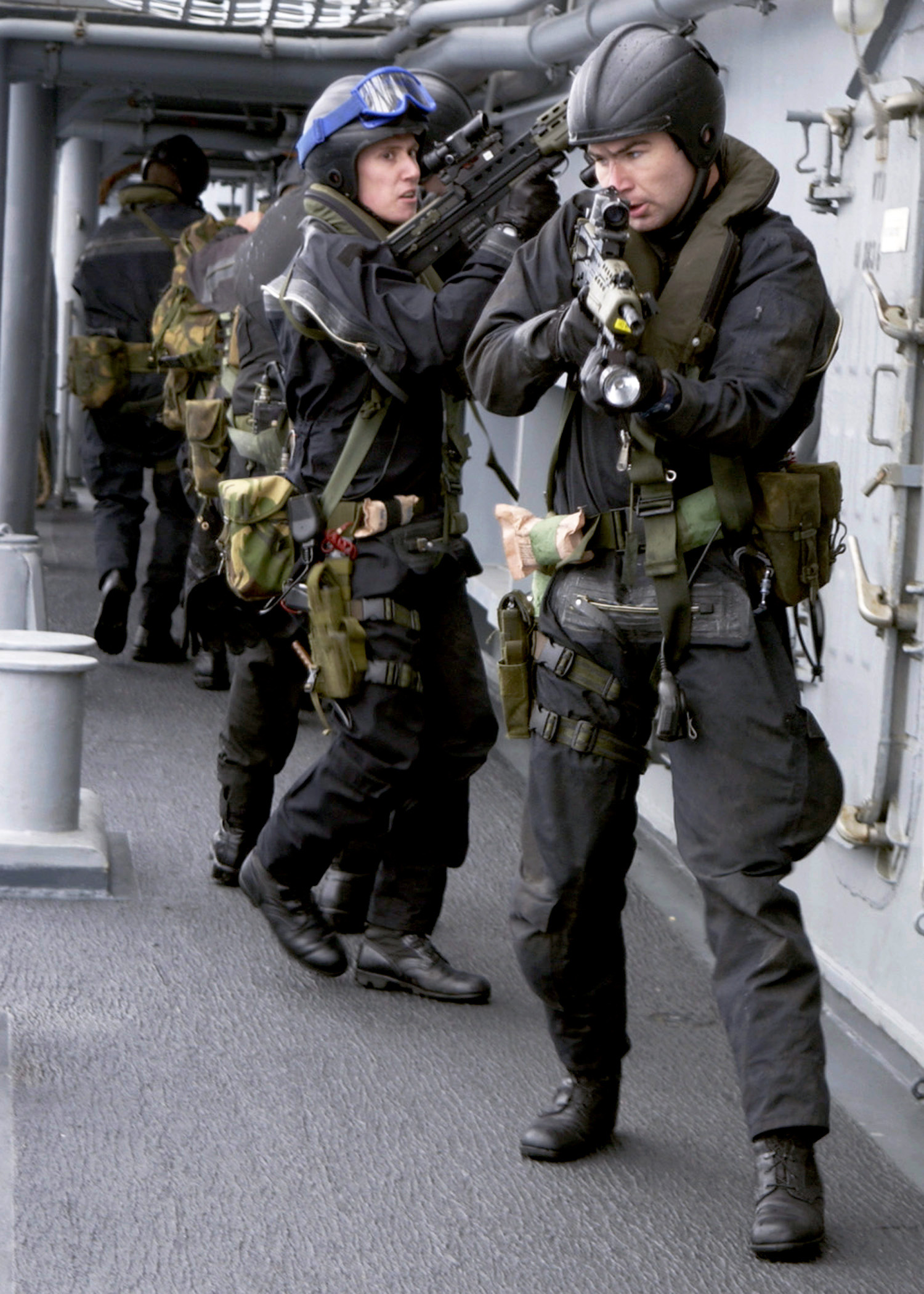
A Royal Marines team boards US Navy destroyer USS O'Bannon

- Commando Training Centre: This is the training unit for the entire corps, and consists of three separate sections:
  - Commando Training Wing: This is the initial basic commando training section for new recruits to the Royal Marines, and the UK Forces All Arms Commando Course.
  - Specialist Wing: This provides specialist training in the various trades which Marines may elect to join once qualified and experienced in a Rifle Company.
  - Command Wing: This provides command training for both officers and NCOs of the Royal Marines.
- Royal Marines Band Service provides regular bands for the Royal Navy and provides expertise to train RN Volunteer Bands. Musicians have an important secondary roles as medics, field hospital orderlies, CBRN specialists and any other roles that may be required of them. Personnel may not be commando trained, usually wearing the dark blue beret instead of green; until 2017, the band service was the only branch of the Royal Marines to admit women.
  - Band of HM Royal Marines, Portsmouth (The Royal Band) (HMS Nelson)
  - Band of HM Royal Marines, Plymouth (HMS Raleigh)
  - Band of HM Royal Marines, Scotland (MoD Caledonia, Rosyth)
  - Band of HM Royal Marines, HMS Collingwood (replacing the Band of Britannia Royal Naval College)
  - Band of HM Royal Marines, Commando Training Centre Royal Marines
  - The Band of the Royal Marines School of Music in Portsmouth (The Training Band)

Relation between Royal Marines, commando-trained personnel, and component units

=== Structure of a commando ===
40 and 45 Commando are each organised into six companies, further organised into platoon-sized troops, as follows:

- Command company
  - Main HQ
  - Tactical HQ
  - Reconnaissance Troop with a sniper section
  - Mortar Troop
  - Anti-Tank (AT) Troop
  - Medium Machine Gun Troop
- 2× Close Combat Companies
  - Company Headquarters
  - 3× Close Combat Troops
- 2× Stand Off Companies
  - Company Headquarters
  - Heavy Machine Gun (HMG) Troop
  - AT Troop
  - Close Combat Troop.
- Logistic Company
  - A Echelon 1
  - A Echelon 2
  - FRT (Forward Repair Team)
  - RAP (Regimental Aid Post)
  - B Echelon

In general a rifle company Marine will be a member of a four-man fire team, the building block of commando operations. A Royal Marine works with their team in the field and shares accommodation if living in barracks. This structure is a recent development, formerly Commandos were structured similarly to British Army light infantry battalions.

== Fleet Air Arm and Flying ==
Royal Marines Officers and NCOs are eligible to serve in the Fleet Air Arm as both fixed wing and rotary wing aircrew. This includes service in the Commando Helicopter Force (CHF) and in fast jets where a Royal Marine officer has commanded 617 Squadron, Royal Air Force.

The CHF comprises three helicopter squadrons and is part of Joint Aviation Command. It consists of both Royal Navy (RN) and Royal Marines personnel. RN personnel need not be commando trained. The CHF not a Royal Marine unit, being neither under the permanent control of UK Commando Force nor the Commandant General Royal Marines, but rather is allocated to support Commando units as required. It uses both Merlin HC4/4A medium-lift and Wildcat AH1 light transport/reconnaissance helicopters.

== Future Commando Force (FCF) Programme ==
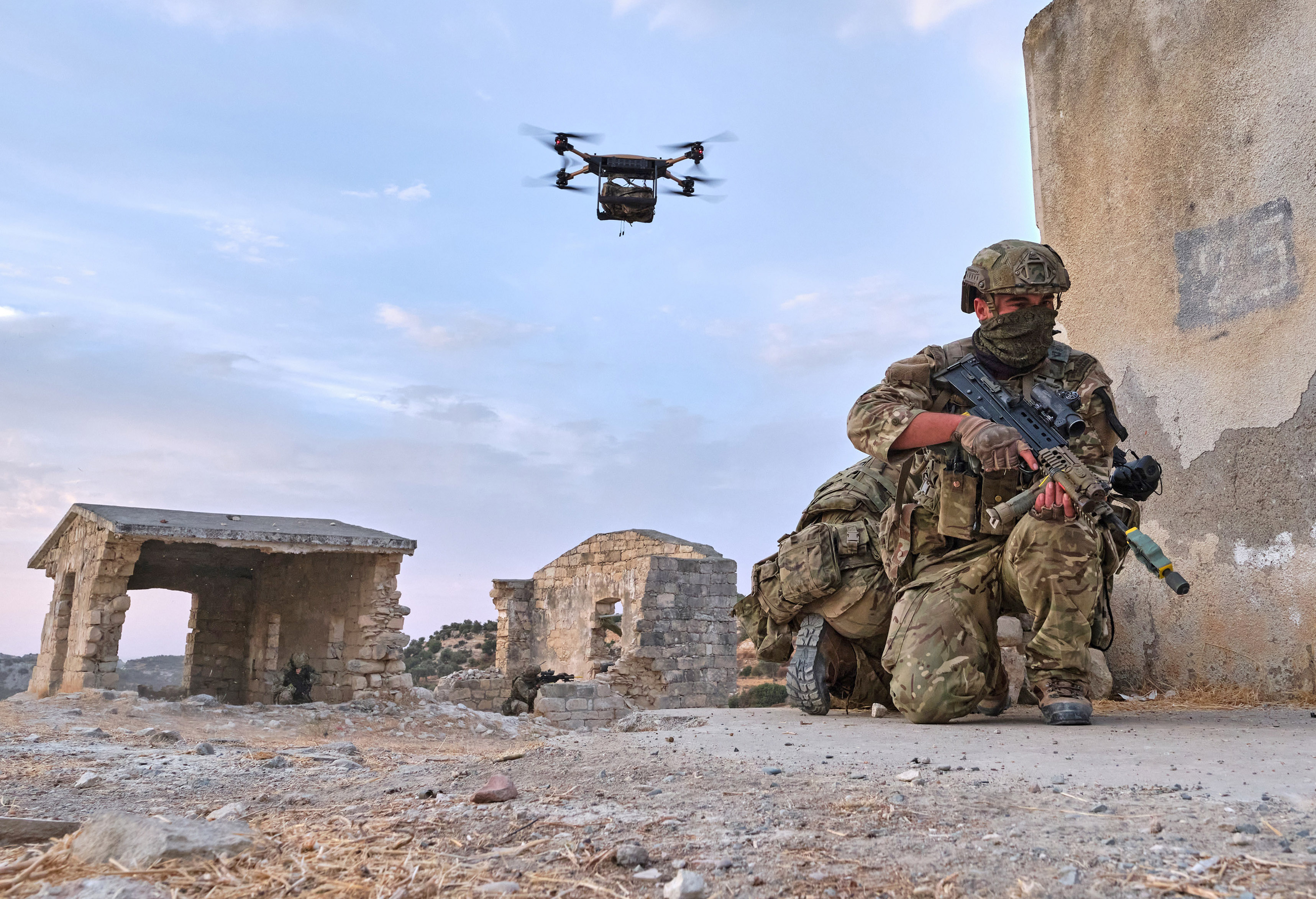
40 Commando Royal Marines helping trial the Littoral Strike concept in 2020.

On 11 April 2017 the First Sea Lord, Admiral Sir Philip Jones, announced that the Royal Marines Commandos would be restructured, making it capable of deploying on special operations as part of the Future Commando Force (FCF) Programme. The Ministry of Defence also said that under the FCF programme, the Royal Marines Commandos would take on many of the traditional tasks of the SAS and SBS, alongside a new Army Ranger Regiment. As part of this programme, Navy Command also announced the designation of staff and technical capability for a land littoral strike division programme. An example of the FCF was depicted by young engineering graduates from the UK Naval Engineering Science and Technology forum (UKNEST). As announced, there would be two Littoral Response Groups: one based East of Suez and one based in the High North. On 27 June 2020, the Royal Marines announced they would adopt a new uniform with MultiCam camouflage to replace the Multi-Terrain Pattern (MTP).

== Selection ==
=== Process ===
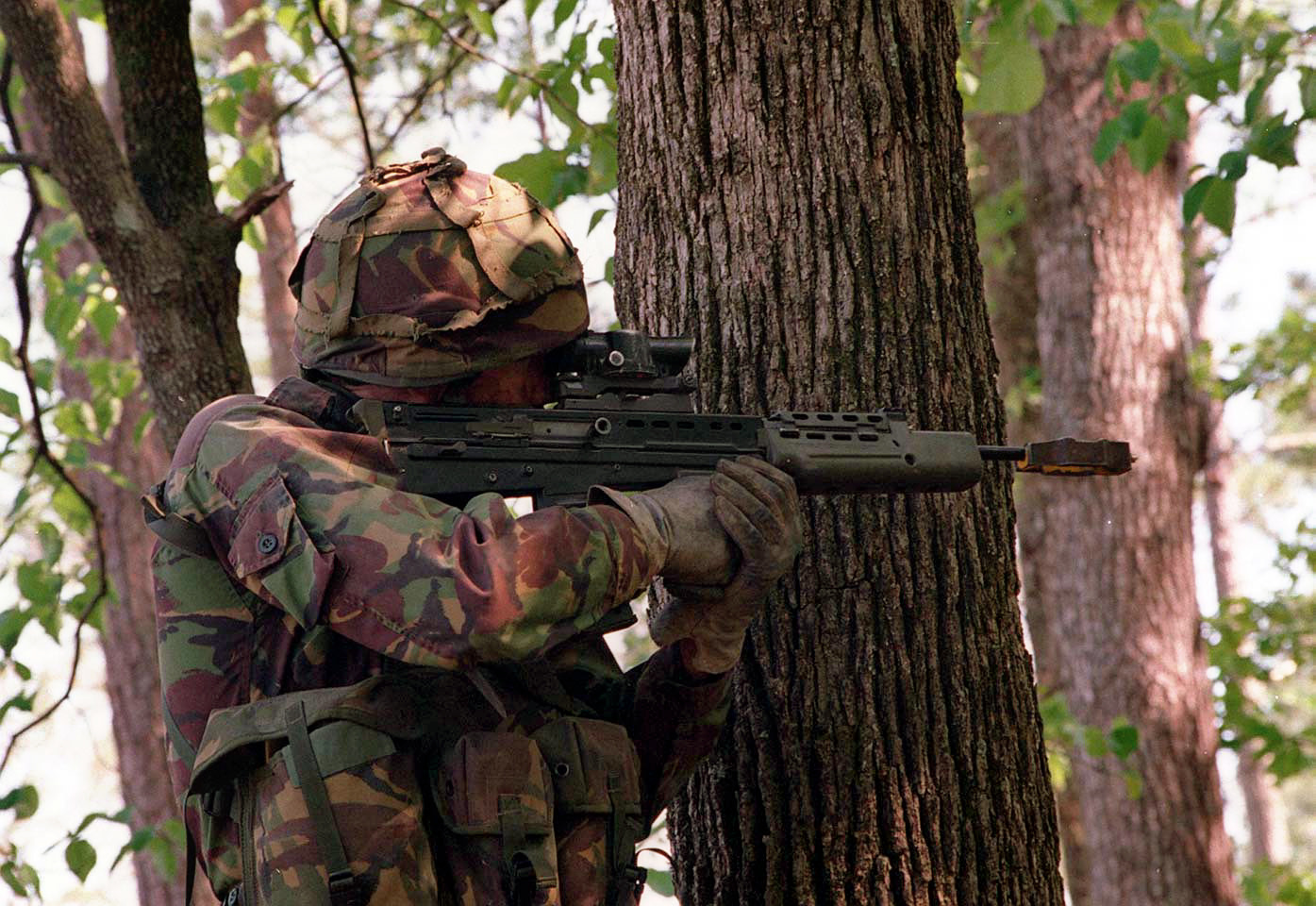
A Royal Marine stands beside a tree to sight in his weapon during a training exercise

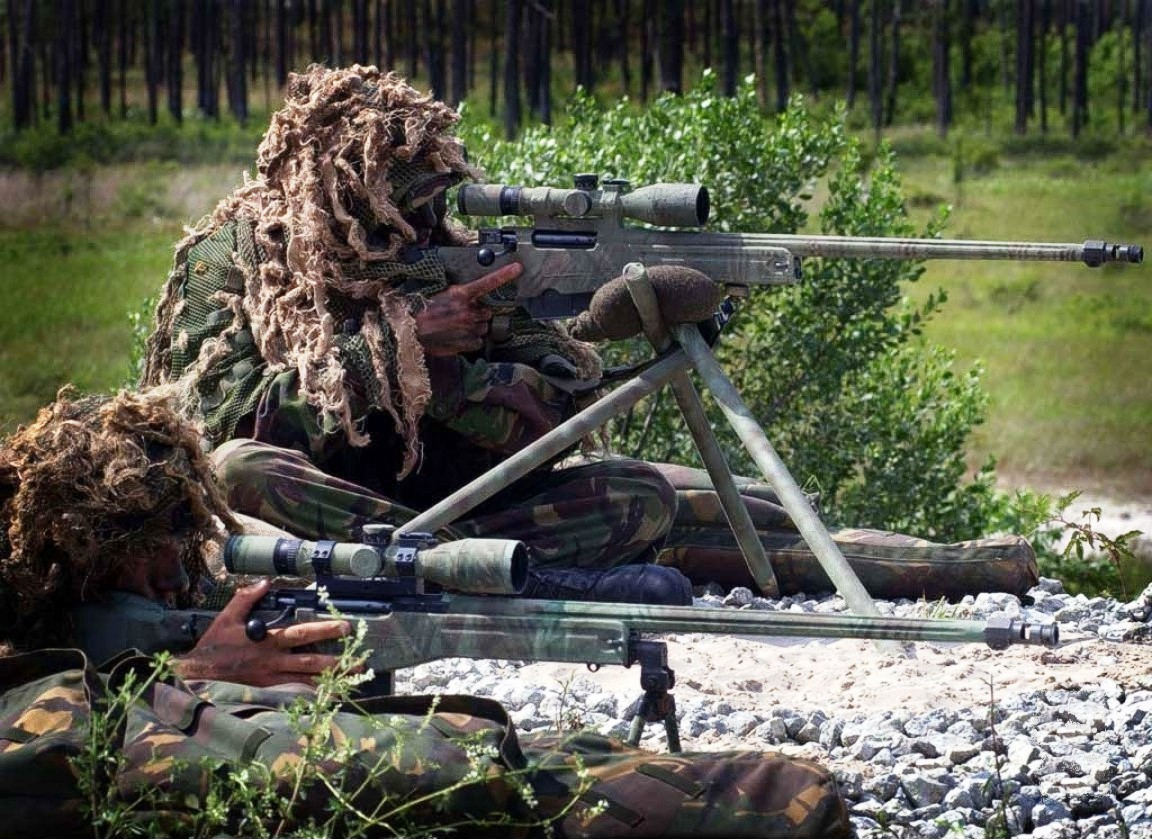
Royal Marines snipers displaying their L115A1 rifles

Royal Marine Commandos are required to undergo the longest and one of the most physically demanding specialist infantry training courses in the world. Recruit training lasts for 36 weeks for Royal Marine Commandos and 64 weeks for Royal Marine Commando Officers. Potential recruits must be aged 16 to 32 (18 to 25 for Commissioned Officers). Applicants must undertake a series of interviews, medical tests, an eye/sight test, psychometric tests, a PJFA (pre-joining fitness Assessment), a 5-day CPC (candidate preparation course), and a 4-week ROP (recruit orientation phase). If an applicant successfully completes all of these phases, then they will get selected for a place in mainstream recruit training, which will take place at CTCRM (commando training centre Royal Marines) in Lympstone, Devon, UK. A large proportion of training is carried out on Dartmoor's inhospitable terrain and Woodbury Common woodland.

=== Training ===
Throughout recruit training, Royal Marines Commando recruits develop foundational combat skills, physical fitness, and mental resilience. Training covers core marksmanship and close quarters combat (CQC), alongside tactical subjects such as demolition, reconnaissance, breaching, raiding, and SERE. Recruits are also instructed in fieldcraft—including camouflage, stalking, and survival skills—as well as mountaineering, fast-roping, CBRN defense, amphibious landings, and military communications. Basic military training further includes map reading, first aid, patrolling, leadership, and parade ground discipline.

The best recruit to finish training is awarded the Kings Badge. King George V directed that his Royal Cypher, surrounded by a laurel wreath, would be known as the King's Badge, and would be awarded to the best all round recruit in the King's Squad, provided that he was worthy of the honour. The badge was to be carried on the left shoulder, and worn in every rank. The King's Badge is not awarded to every squad, and is only presented if a recruit measures up to the very exacting standards required.

Throughout their career, a Royal Marine Commando can specialise in a number of different roles upon completion of their respective courses after spending one to two years as a general duties (GD) rifleman at a unit. Examples of some specialisations and different courses includes the mountain leader (ML), physical training instructor (PTI), Assault Engineer (AE), Royal Marines police (RMP), sniper (S), medical assistant (MA), pilot, reconnaissance operator (RO), drill instructor (DL), driver (D), clerk (C), signaller (SI), combat intelligence (CI), armourer (A), and heavy weapons (HW). Royal Marines can also apply for swimmer canoeist/Special Boat Service selection (SBS) or any other branch of the UKSF. All Royal Marines will also conduct training exercises on differing military skills on a regular basis including development in mountain, arctic, jungle, amphibious and desert warfare. They can also be involved in exchange training programs with other countries' forces – particularly the United States Marine Corps and the Netherlands Marine Corps/Korps Mariniers.

== Museum ==
The Royal Marines Museum (established in October 1958) is an institution dedicated to the history of the Royal Marines. In 2011, it became part of the National Museum of the Royal Navy, which has since been the executive public body of the museum in the Ministry of Defence. It will soon be moving from Eastney Barracks to Portsmouth Dockyard.

== Customs ==
=== Traditions ===
The Royal Marines have a long history and unique traditions. With the exceptions of "Gibraltar" and the laurel wreath for the Battle of Belle Island, their colours (flags) do not carry battle honours in the manner of the regiments of the British Army or of the US Marine Corps, but rather the "globe itself" as a symbol of the Corps. This symbol later became one of the inspirations for the Globe in the United States Marine Corps' Eagle, Globe, and Anchor insignia.

The heraldic badge of the Royal Marines commemorates the history of the Corps. The Lion and Crown denotes a Royal regiment. King George III conferred this honour in 1802 "in consideration of the very meritorious services of the Marines in the late war." The "Great Globe itself" was chosen in 1827 by King George IV in place of battle honours to recognise the Marines' service and successes in multiple engagements in every quarter of the world. The laurels are believed to honour the gallantry they displayed during the investment and capture of Belle Isle, off Lorient, in April–June 1761. The word Gibraltar refers to the Capture of Gibraltar by a force of Anglo-Dutch Marines in 1704 and the subsequent defence of the strategic fortress throughout a nine-month siege against a numerically superior Franco-Spanish force. Their determination and valour throughout the siege led to a contemporary report published in The Triumphs of Her Majesty's Arms in 1707 to announce:

Encouraged by the Prince of Hesse, the garrison did more than could humanly be expected, and the English Marines gained an immortal glory

— referred to by Paul Harris Nicolas, Historical Record of the Royal Marine Forces

There are no other battle honours displayed on the colours of the four battalion-sized units of the current Corps. The Latin motto "Per Mare Per Terram" translates into English as "By Sea By Land". Believed to have been first used in 1775, this motto describes the Royal Marines ability in fighting both afloat on-board ships of the Royal Navy as well as ashore in their many land engagements. The fouled anchor, incorporated into the emblem in 1747, is the badge of the Lord High Admiral, and shows that the Corps is part of the Naval Service.

The regimental quick march of the Royal Marines is "A Life on the Ocean Wave", while the slow march is the march of the Preobrazhensky Regiment, awarded to the Corps by Admiral of the Fleet The Earl Mountbatten of Burma on the occasion of the Corps's tercentenary in 1964. Lord Mountbatten was Life Colonel Commandant of the Royal Marines until his murder by the IRA in 1979.

The Royal Marines are allowed by the Lord Mayor of the City of London to march through the City as a regiment in full array. This dates to the charter of Charles II that allowed recruiting parties of the Admiral's Regiment of 1664 to enter the city with drums beating and colours flying.

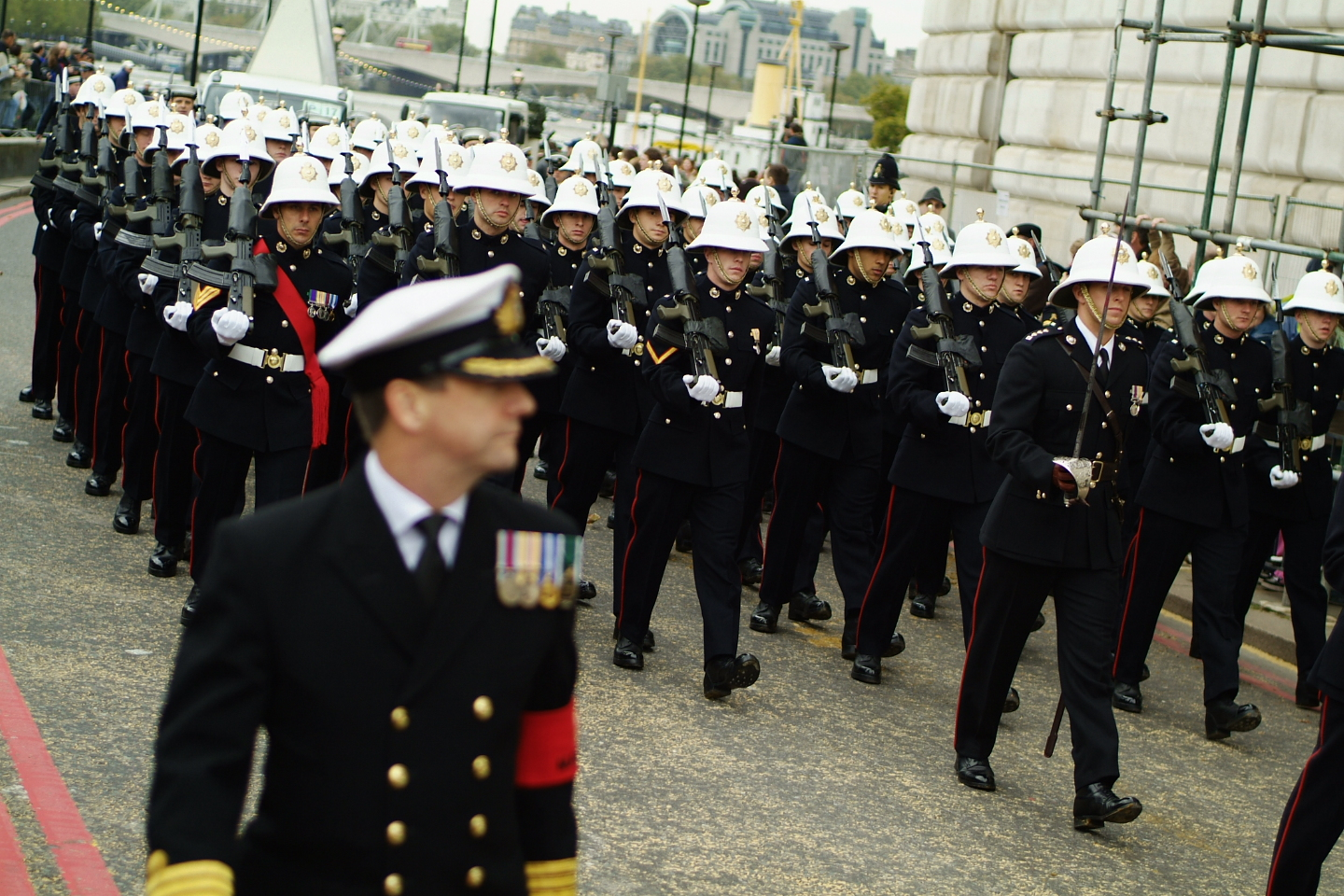
The dark blue Number 1A uniform worn with pith helmets

=== Uniforms ===
Modern Royal Marines uniforms are broadly similar to British Army uniforms but include a number of distinctive uniform items. These include the green "Lovat" shade of service dress uniform; the green beret (for those who have passed the commando course) or navy blue beret with a scarlet patch behind the badge (for those who have not); dark blue parade dress worn with either the white Wolseley Pattern Helmet (commonly referred to as "pith helmet") or white and red peaked cap; the scarlet and blue mess dress for officers and senior non-commissioned officers; and the white hot-weather uniform of the Band Service.

== Ranks and insignia ==
The Royal Marines rank alongside their army equivalents. However, when on the books of any HM Ship or Naval Establishment, Royal Marines were subject to the Naval Discipline Act 1957. In those circumstances, many officer ranks in the Royal Marines formerly enjoyed greater status. Second lieutenants were equivalent to sub lieutenants and ranks from lieutenant to major were considered equivalent to one rank higher (OF-2 to OF-4). Lieutenant colonels were considered equivalent to RN captains with less than six years in the rank, and colonels were equivalent to captains with more than six years seniority. This state of affairs ended on 1 July 1999, when Royal Marine officer ranks were fully aligned with those of the army. Officers in the Royal Marines wear the same rank insignia as their army counterparts but their insignia is smaller at 5/8 inch (16 mm) in diameter. Commissioned officers below the rank of colonel wear the initials "RM" below their rank insignia.

The entry rank of the Royal Marines from 1923 onwards is Marine, abbreviated to Mne.

Rank insignia of the commissioned officers of the Royal Marines
Rank group	General officers			Field officers				Junior officers			Officer cadets
NATO code	OF-9	OF-8	OF-7	OF-6	OF-5	OF-4	OF-3	OF-2	OF-1		N/A
Insignia											
Rank	General	Lieutenant-general	Major-general	Brigadier	Colonel	Lieutenant colonel	Major	Captain	Lieutenant	Second lieutenant	Officer cadet
Abbreviation	Gen	Lt Gen	Maj Gen	Brig	Col	Lt Col	Maj	Capt	Lt	2Lt	OCdt

Rank insignia of the other ranks of the Royal Marines
Rank group	Warrant officers			Senior NCOs			Junior NCOs		Marines
NATO code	OR-9		OR-8	OR-7	OR-6	OR-5	OR-4	OR-3	OR-2
Insignia									No insignia
Typical appointment	Corps regimental sergeant major	Regimental sergeant major	Regimental quartermaster sergeant / company sergeant major	Company quartermaster sergeant					
Rank	Warrant officer class 1		Warrant officer class 2	Colour sergeant	Sergeant		Corporal	Lance corporal	Marine
Abbreviation	WO1		WO2	CSgt	Sgt		Cpl	LCpl	Mne

=== Captain General ===
The current uniform and insignia worn by the Captain General Royal Marines, presently King Charles III, is the uniform and insignia of a field marshal, consisting of two crossed batons surrounded by yellow leaves below a crown.

Rank	Insignia
Captain General Royal Marines	

As Captain General Royal Marines, Prince Harry was entitled to wear crossed batons surrounded by a laurel wreath, crown above, i.e. the rank insignia of a field marshal. Despite this, Prince Harry, at least on some occasions, opted to wear the rank insignia of a colonel, traditionally worn by some colonels-in-chief in the British Army.

== Associations with other regiments and marine corps ==
=== Argyll and Sutherland Highlanders ===
Early connections date from Balaclava in the Crimean War and Lucknow during the Indian Rebellion of 1857, but the main association stems from World War II. In July 1940, after the fall of Dunkirk, the 5th Battalion, Argyll and Sutherland Highlanders served with the Royal Marine Brigade for over a year. When the battleships HMS Prince of Wales and HMS Repulse were sunk in December 1941, the Royal Marines survivors joined up with the remnants of the 2nd Battalion, in the defence of Singapore. They formed what became known as 'The Plymouth Argylls', after the association football team, since both ships were Plymouth manned. Most of the Highlanders and Marines who survived the bitter fighting were taken prisoner by the Japanese. The Royal Marines inter-unit rugby football trophy is the 'Argyll Bowl', presented to the Corps by the Regiment in 1941.

=== Princess of Wales's Royal Regiment ===
The fore-bearer regiments of the Princess of Wales's Royal Regiment, 31st (Huntingdonshire) Regiment of Foot was initially raised as amphibious troops. They served as Marines for a period. To this day one officer from the Royal Marines serves with the PWRR and Vice Versa. Also the Royal Marine Lanyard is worn by all ranks in Service Dress and Number 2 Dress uniform and barrack dress of PWRR.

=== United States Marine Corps ===
The Royal Marines and the United States Marine Corps have close cultural links arising from the Special Relationship, having trained together and fought together on multiple occasions. The two marine corps share an exchange program in which a Royal Marine colour sergeant is assigned to the US Marine Corps Officer Candidate School as a staff member training candidate, while a US marine is assigned to a Royal Marine unit as a staff member.

=== Barbados Defence Force ===
Close links have existed between the Royal Marines and the Barbados Defence Force since 1985 when a bond was established following a series of cross-training exercises in the Caribbean. The Alliance was approved by HM the Queen in 1992.

=== Netherlands Marine Corps ===
The Royal Marines have close links with the Royal Netherlands Marine Corps, with whom they conduct NATO exercises throughout the year. Units of the Royal Netherlands Marine Corps work in close co-operation with 3 Commando Brigade of the Royal Marines. Operational units of the Royal Netherlands Marine Corps are fully integrated into this brigade. This integration is known as the United Kingdom-Netherlands Landing Force and is a component of the United Kingdom-Netherlands Amphibious Force as a key strike force during the Cold War to strengthen the Nordic area.

=== French 9th Marine Infantry Brigade (former 9th Light Armoured Marine Brigade) ===
The 9th Marine Infantry Brigade (9^{e} Brigade d'Infanterie de Marine, 9^{e} BIMa) is a Marine infantry brigade which is one of the two designated amphibious brigades in France. It is unique in being the only 'All Marine' Brigade in the French Army; the other amphibious brigade, 6th Light Armoured Brigade (6^{e} Brigade Légère Blindée, 6^{e} BLB), is composed of a mix of cap badges. 9^{e} BIMa is also a light armoured brigade, formed of two Marine infantry regiments (2^{e} RIMa and 3^{e} RIMa — Régiments d'Infanterie de Marine) and a tank battalion.

== See also ==
- Royal Marines selection and training
- Royal Marines Reserve
- Royal Marines Museum
- Royal Marines Cadets
- Royal Marines Volunteer Cadet Corps
- List of active Royal Marines military watercraft
- List of serving senior officers of the Royal Marines

== Bibliography ==
- Akins, Thomas Beamish (2015) [1895]. History of Halifax. Brookhouse Press. ISBN 978-1-298-60046-2.
- Brooks, Richard; Little, Matthew (2008). Tracing Your Royal Marine Ancestors: A Guide for Family Historians. Pen & Sword, Barnsley. ISBN 978-1-84415-869-0.
- Chappell, Mike (2004). Wellington's Peninsula Regiments (2): The Light Infantry. Oxford: Osprey Publishing. ISBN 978-1-84176-403-0.
- Chartrand, Rene (2002). Colonial American Troops, 1610–1774. Vol. 1. Osprey Publishing. ISBN 978-1-84176-324-8.
- Dutton, Jim (August 2000), "The Royal Marines Today", RUSI Journal, 145 (4): 21–24, doi:10.1080/03071840008446547, S2CID 154589456
- Edye, Lourenço (1893). The Historical Records of the Royal Marines. Vol. v. 1. London: Harrison & Sons.
- Francis, David (1975). The First Peninsular War: 1702–1713. Ernest Benn. ISBN 978-0-510-00205-3.
- Gleig, George Robert (1827). The campaigns of the British army at Washington and New Orleans in the years 1814–1815. John Murray, London.
- Heidler, David; Heidler, Jeanne (2004). Encyclopedia of the War Of 1812. Naval Institute Press. ISBN 978-1-59114-362-8.
- Moore, John (1989). The First Fleet Marines. University of Queensland Press. ISBN 978-0-7022-2065-4.
- Mountbatten, Lord Louis (1943). Combined Operations: The Official Story of the Commandos. New York, The Macmillan Company.
- Nicolas, Paul (1845). Historical record of the Royal marine forces. Thomas and Boone, London.
- Lenihan, Padraig (2008). Consolidating Conquest, Ireland 1603–1727. Pearson Education. ISBN 978-0-582-77217-5.
- Neillands, Robin (2004). By Sea and Land: The Story of the Royal Marine Commandos. Barnsley: Pen & Sword Classics. ISBN 1-84415-043-7.
- Thompson, Julian (2001). The Royal Marines, From Sea Soldiers to a Special Force. Pan Books. ISBN 978-0-330-37702-7.
- Carter, B L (2013). A Short history of The Royal Marines. Royal marines Historical Society. ISBN 978-1-908123-05-3.
