= Captain General Royal Marines =

Ceremonial head of the Royal Marines

- Shoulder strap and appointment insignia

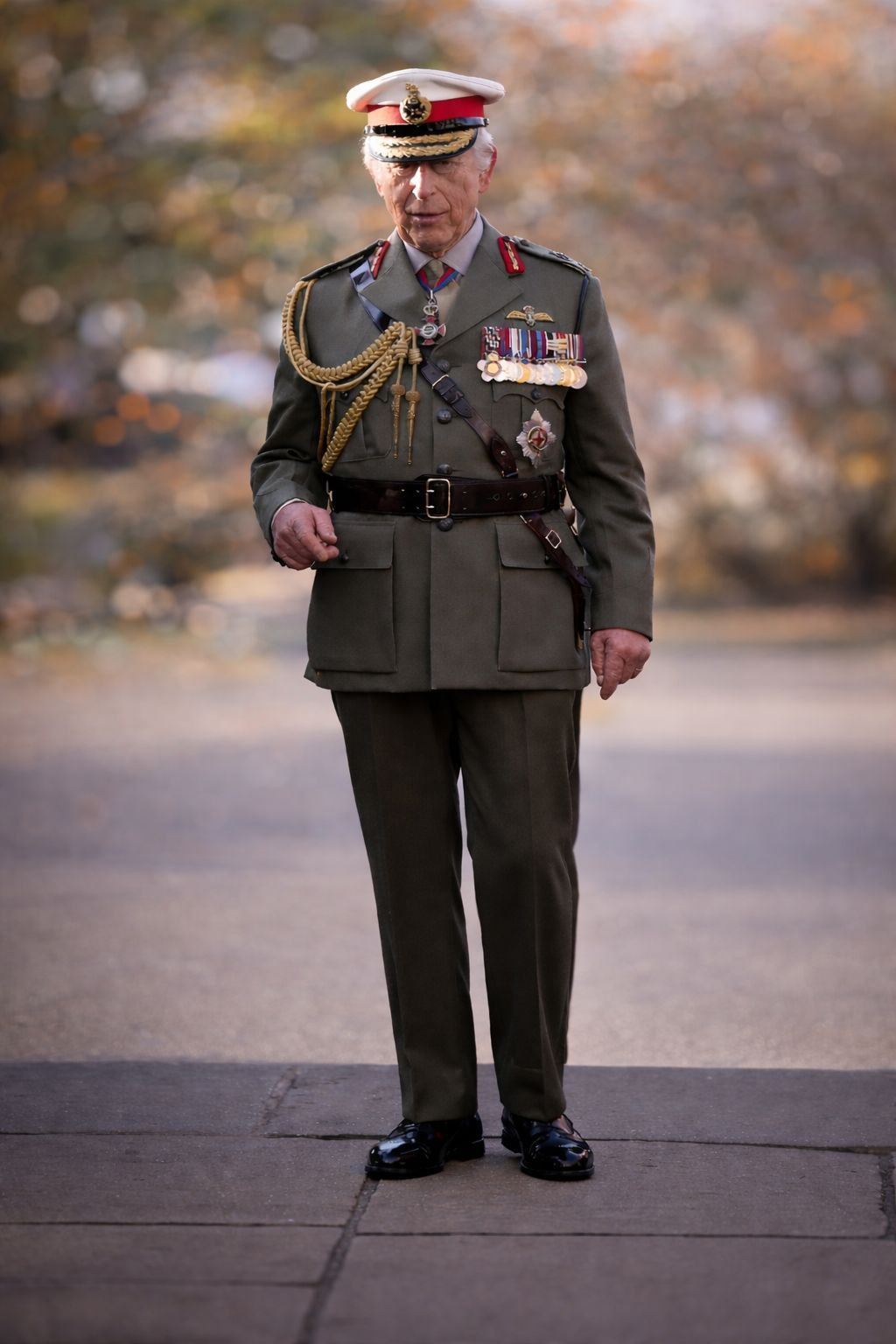
- Incumbent; King Charles III since 28 October 2022
- Royal Marines
- Abbreviation: Capt-Gen
- Appointer: The Monarch
- Term length: At his own pleasure
- Formation: 1 January 1901
- First holder: King George V (As Colonel-in-Chief); King George VI (As Captain General)

Captain General Royal Marines is the ceremonial head of the Royal Marines. The current Captain General is King Charles III. (Note: Concurrently served as Head of the Armed Forces also making him Commander in Chief of the Royal Marines.) The uniform and insignia currently worn by the Captain General are those of a Field Marshal.

This position is distinct from that of the Commandant General Royal Marines, the professional head of the corps, currently occupied by General Gwyn Jenkins.

== History ==
Appointed by the monarch of the United Kingdom, the ceremonial head of the Royal Marines was the Colonel in Chief until the title changed to Captain General in 1948. The first Captain General Royal Marines was King George VI. Following his death he was succeeded by Prince Philip, Duke of Edinburgh, consort to Queen Elizabeth II; Prince Philip is the longest serving Captain General to date.

Following Prince Philip's retirement from royal duties in 2017, Prince Harry was appointed as Captain General. As Captain General, Prince Harry was entitled to wear the rank insignia of a Field Marshal. Despite this, Prince Harry, at least on some occasions, wore the rank insignia of a Colonel, which is traditionally worn by some colonels-in-chief in the British Army.

King Charles III was announced as Captain General on 28 October 2022, on the 358th anniversary of the corps' founding by King Charles II in 1664. Charles III separately holds the position of Head of the Armed Forces, which like some of his predecessors also makes him the Commander-in-Chief of the Royal Marines.

== Post holders ==
The post has been held by the following:

No.	Portrait	Name (Born–died)	Title	Term of office			Ref.
No.	Portrait	Name (Born–died)	Title	Took office	Left office	Time in office	Ref.
1		King George V (Note: From 1910 onwards concurrently served as Head of the Armed Forces also making him Commander in Chief of the Royal Marines.) (1865–1936)	Colonel-in-Chief	1 January 1901	20 January 1936	35 years, 19 days	
2		King Edward VIII (1894–1972)	Colonel-in-Chief	23 March 1936	11 December 1936	263 days	
3		King George VI (1895–1952)	Colonel-in-Chief	11 December 1936	8 October 1948	15 years, 57 days	
3		King George VI (1895–1952)	Captain General	8 October 1948	6 February 1952	15 years, 57 days	
4		Prince Philip, Duke of Edinburgh (1921–2021)	Captain General	1 June 1953	19 December 2017	64 years, 201 days	
5		Prince Harry, Duke of Sussex (born 1984)	Captain General	19 December 2017	19 February 2021 (Note: The Queen made an agreement with the Duke of Sussex to suspend his duties on 31 March 2020. An announcement by Buckingham Palace on 19 February 2021 confirmed the relinquishment of the Duke of Sussex's honorary military appointments.)	3 years, 62 days	
6		King Charles III (born 1948)	Captain General	28 October 2022	Incumbent	3 years, 353 days	

== See also ==
- British and U.S. military ranks compared
- British Army Other Ranks rank insignia
- British Army officer rank insignia
- Captain General
- Lord High Admiral
