= Special operations capable =

Special operations capable may refer to:

- Special operations-capable forces, a term that was used by the British Armed Forces
- Maritime Special Operations Capable (MARSOC), a term used by the Royal Netherlands Marine Corps (Dutch: Korps Mariniers)
- Marine expeditionary unit (special operations capable) (MEU(SOC)), a term used by the United States Marine Corps
