= Buttle (surname) =

Buttle is a surname. Notable people with the surname include:

- Cecil Buttle (1906–1988), English cricketer
- Frank Buttle (1878–1953), English social worker, founder of Buttle UK
- Gladwin Albert Hurst Buttle (1899–1983), British pharmacologist (brother of Frank)
- Greg Buttle (born 1954), retired American football linebacker
- Jeffrey Buttle (born 1982), Canadian figure skater
- Keith Buttle (1900–1973), New Zealand businessman and politician
- Robert D. Buttle (died 1901), the sole Brooklyn survivor of the Marine battalion which took part in the Mexican–American War
- Steve Buttle (1953–2012), English footballer and manager

Fictional characters:

- Buttle family, characters from the 1985 film Brazil
