= Buttel =

Buttel may refer to:

- Büttel, German municipality
- Frederick H. Buttel (1948–2005), American professor of rural sociology

== See also ==
- Buttle (disambiguation)
- Butel, Macedonian municipality
