= Buttle =

Buttle may refer to:

- Buttle (surname)
- Buttle, Gotland, a settlement on the Swedish island of Gotland
- Buttle Lake, a lake on Vancouver Island in Strathcona Regional District, British Columbia, Canada
- Buttle UK, a children's charity based in the United Kingdom
