= Haddon, Cambridgeshire =

Village in Cambridgeshire, England

Coordinates: 52.517°N 0.316°W

Haddon
- Location within Cambridgeshire
- OS grid reference: TL142923
- District: Huntingdonshire
- Shire county: Cambridgeshire
- Region: East
- Country: England
- Sovereign state: United Kingdom
- Post town: Peterborough
- Postcode district: PE7
- Police: Cambridgeshire
- Fire: Cambridgeshire
- Ambulance: East of England
- UK Parliament: North West Cambridgeshire

Haddon is a village and civil parish in Cambridgeshire, England. Haddon lies approximately 5 miles (8 km) south-west of Peterborough city centre, near to Chesterton and Yaxley. Haddon is situated within Huntingdonshire which is a non-metropolitan district of Cambridgeshire as well as being a historic county of England.

From 1927 to 1937 the Rev Frank Buttle was rector of Chesterton with Haddon and Alwalton.

== History ==
In 1085 William the Conqueror ordered that a survey should be carried out across his kingdom to discover who owned which parts and what it was worth. The survey took place in 1086 and the results were recorded in what, since the 12th century, has become known as the Domesday Book. Starting with the king himself, for each landholder within a county there is a list of their estates or manors; and, for each manor, there is a summary of the resources of the manor, the amount of annual rent that was collected by the lord of the manor both in 1066 and in 1086, together with the taxable value.

Haddon was listed in the Domesday Book in the Hundred of Normancross in Huntingdonshire; the name of the settlement was written as Adone in the Domesday Book. In 1086 there was just one manor at Haddon; the annual rent paid to the lord of the manor in 1066 had been £5 and the rent was the same in 1086.

The Domesday Book does not explicitly detail the population of a place but it records that there were 19 households at Haddon. There is no consensus about the average size of a household at that time; estimates range from 3.5 to 5.0 people per household. Using these figures then an estimate of the population of Haddon in 1086 is that it was within the range of 66 and 95 people.

The Domesday Book uses a number of units of measure for areas of land that are now unfamiliar terms, such as hides and ploughlands. In different parts of the country, these were terms for the area of land that a team of eight oxen could plough in a single season and are equivalent to 120 acres (49 hectares); this was the amount of land that was considered to be sufficient to support a single family. By 1086, the hide had become a unit of tax assessment rather than an actual land area; a hide was the amount of land that could be assessed as £1 for tax purposes. The survey records that there were ploughlands at Haddon in 1086 and that there was the capacity for a further four ploughlands. In addition to the arable land, there was 24 acres (10 hectares) of meadows and 1 acre (0 hectares) of woodland at Haddon.

The tax assessment in the Domesday Book was known as geld or danegeld and was a type of land-tax based on the hide or ploughland. It was originally a way of collecting a tribute to pay off the Danes when they attacked England, and was only levied when necessary. Following the Norman Conquest, the geld was used to raise money for the King and to pay for continental wars; by 1130, the geld was being collected annually. Having determined the value of a manor's land and other assets, a tax of so many shillings and pence per pound of value would be levied on the land holder. While this was typically two shillings in the pound the amount did vary; for example, in 1084 it was as high as six shillings in the pound. For the manor at Haddon the total tax assessed was five geld.

By 1086 there was already a church and a priest at Haddon.

== Government ==
Haddon is a small parish and does not have a parish council; it holds an annual parish meeting.

Haddon was in the historic and administrative county of Huntingdonshire until 1965. From 1965, the village was part of the new administrative county of Huntingdon and Peterborough. Then in 1974, following the Local Government Act 1972, Haddon became a part of the county of Cambridgeshire.

The second tier of local government is Huntingdonshire District Council which is a non-metropolitan district of Cambridgeshire and has its headquarters in Huntingdon. Huntingdonshire District Council has 52 councillors representing 29 district wards. Huntingdonshire District Council collects the council tax, and provides services such as building regulations, local planning, environmental health, leisure and tourism. Haddon is a part of the district ward of Elton and Folksworth and is represented on the district council by one councillor. District councillors serve for four-year terms following elections to Huntingdonshire District Council.

For Haddon the highest tier of local government is Cambridgeshire County Council which has administration buildings in Cambridge. The county council provides county-wide services such as major road infrastructure, fire and rescue, education, social services, libraries and heritage services. Cambridgeshire County Council consists of 69 councillors representing 60 electoral divisions. Haddon is part of the electoral division of Norman Cross and is represented on the county council by two councillors.

At Westminster Haddon is in the parliamentary constituency of North West Cambridgeshire, and elects one Member of Parliament (MP) by the first past the post system of election. Haddon is represented in the House of Commons by Shailesh Vara (Conservative). Shailesh Vara has represented the constituency since 2005. The previous member of parliament was Brian Mawhinney (Conservative) who represented the constituency between 1997 and 2005.

== Demography ==
=== Population ===
In the period 1801 to 1901 the population of Haddon was recorded every ten years by the UK census. During this time the population was in the range of 77 (the lowest was in 1801) and 146 (the highest was in 1861).

From 1901, a census was taken every ten years with the exception of 1941 (due to the Second World War).

Parish	1911	1921	1931	1951	1961	1971	1981	1991	2001	2011
Haddon	108	99	114	88	66	48	45	44	50	97

All population census figures from report Historic Census figures Cambridgeshire to 2011 by Cambridgeshire Insight.

In 2011, the parish covered an area of 1,218 acres (493 hectares). Also from the 2011 Census the population being less than 100 was excluded from this listing and included in the civil parish of Chesterton.
