= Chesterton, Cambridgeshire =

Chesterton may refer to:

- Chesterton, Cambridge, a suburb of north-east Cambridge, England
- Chesterton, Huntingdonshire, a village historically separate but now in the far west of Cambridgeshire, England
