= General Houghton =

General Houghton may refer to:

- Kenneth J. Houghton (1920–2006), U.S. Marine Corps major general
- Nick Houghton (born 1954), British Army general
- Robert Houghton (1912–2011), Royal Marines major general
