= Alwalton =

Village in Cambridgeshire, England

Coordinates: 52°32′58″N 0°19′46″W

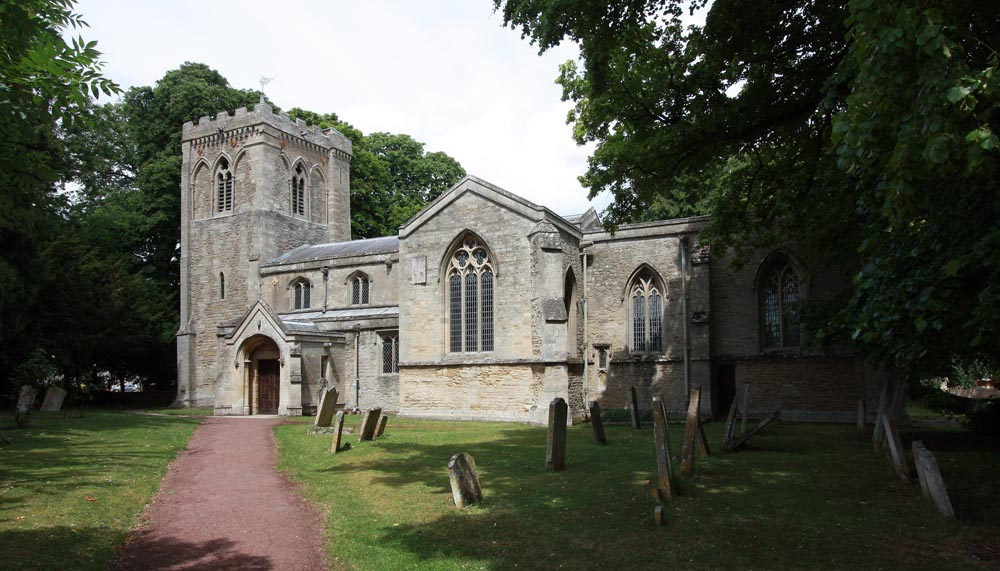
- St Andrew's Church, Alwalton

- Location within Cambridgeshire
- Population: 317 (2011)
- OS grid reference: TL141960
- District: Huntingdonshire
- Shire county: Cambridgeshire
- Region: East
- Country: England
- Sovereign state: United Kingdom
- Post town: Peterborough
- Postcode district: PE7
- Police: Cambridgeshire
- Fire: Cambridgeshire
- Ambulance: East of England
- UK Parliament: North West Cambridgeshire

Alwalton is a village and civil parish in Cambridgeshire, England. Alwalton lies approximately 5 miles (8 km) west of Peterborough city centre. Alwalton is situated within Huntingdonshire which is a non-metropolitan district of Cambridgeshire as well as being a historic county of England. The village runs onto the Peterborough suburb of Orton Northgate, with which the administrative boundary runs along the A605 road, the northern side of the road being in Alwalton and the southern side in Orton Northgate. Alwalton overlooks the southern bank of the River Nene and is close to the line of Ermine Street or the A1 road, west of which lies the neighbouring village of Chesterton.

== Domesday Book ==
Alwalton was listed in the Domesday Book in the hundred of Norman Cross in Huntingdonshire; the name of the settlement was written as Alwoltune. In 1086 there was just one manor at Alwalton; the annual rent paid to the lord of the manor in 1066 had been £7 and the rent was the same in 1086.

The Domesday Book does not explicitly detail the population of a place but it records that there was 20 households at Alwalton. There is no consensus about the average size of a household at that time; estimates range from 3.5 to 5.0 people per household. Using these figures then an estimate of the population of Alwalton in 1086 is that it was within the range of 70 and 100 people. The survey records that there was nine ploughlands at Alwalton in 1086. In addition to the arable land, there was 10 acres (4 hectares) of meadows, two water mills and a fishery at Alwalton. For the manor at Alwalton the total tax assessed was five geld.

There was no mention of a church at Alwalton.

== Governance ==
As a civil parish, Alwalton has a parish council elected by the residents of the parish who have registered on the electoral roll. A parish council is the lowest tier of government in England, responsible for providing and maintaining a variety of local services including allotments and a cemetery; grass cutting and tree planting within public open spaces such as a village green or playing fields. The parish council reviews planning applications that might affect the parish and makes recommendations to the local planning authority. The parish council also represents the views of the parish on issues such as local transport, policing and the environment. The parish council raises the parish precept to pay for services, which is collected as part of the Council Tax. Alwalton parish council consists of five members and normally meets on the third Thursday of every month in the village hall.

Alwalton was in the historic and administrative county of Huntingdonshire until 1965. From 1965, the village was part of the new administrative county of Huntingdon and Peterborough. Then in 1974, following the Local Government Act 1972, Alwalton became a part of the county of Cambridgeshire.

The second tier of local government is Huntingdonshire District Council which is a non-metropolitan district of Cambridgeshire and has its headquarters in Huntingdon. Huntingdonshire District Council has 52 councillors representing 29 district wards. Huntingdonshire District Council collects the council tax, and provides services such as building regulations, local planning, environmental health, leisure and tourism. Alwalton is part of the district ward of Elton and Folksworth, represented by one councillor. District councillors serve for four-year terms following elections to Huntingdonshire District Council.

For Alwalton, the highest tier of local government is Cambridgeshire County Council. The county council provides county-wide services such as major road infrastructure, fire and rescue, education, social services, libraries and heritage services. Cambridgeshire County Council consists of 69 councillors representing 60 electoral divisions. Alwalton is a part of the electoral division of Sawtry & Stilton, represented on the county council by one councillor. County councillors serve four-year terms following elections to Cambridgeshire County Council.

At Westminster, Alwalton is in the parliamentary constituency of North West Cambridgeshire, and elects one Member of Parliament (MP) by the first past the post system of election. Since 2024 the constituency has been represented by Sam Carling of the Labour Party.

== Demography ==
=== Population ===
In the period 1801 to 1901 the population of Alwalton was recorded every ten years by the UK census. During this time the population was in the range of 216 (the lowest in 1811) and 342 (the highest in 1861).

From 1901, a census was taken every ten years with the exception of 1941 (due to the Second World War).

Parish	1911	1921	1931	1951	1961	1971	1981	1991	2001	2011
Alwalton	219	214	201	199	210	326	352	300	336	317

All population census figures from report Historic Census figures Cambridgeshire to 2011 by Cambridgeshire Insight. In 2011, the parish covered an area of 175 acres (71 hectares) and so the population density for Alwalton in 2011 was 1159.3 persons per square mile (446.5 per square kilometre).

== Landmarks ==
Alwalton is a conservation area with a number of listed buildings, the most important of which are the Norman Church of St Andrew's and the Elizabethan Manor House. Alwalton Hall was built for the 4th Earl Fitzwilliam.

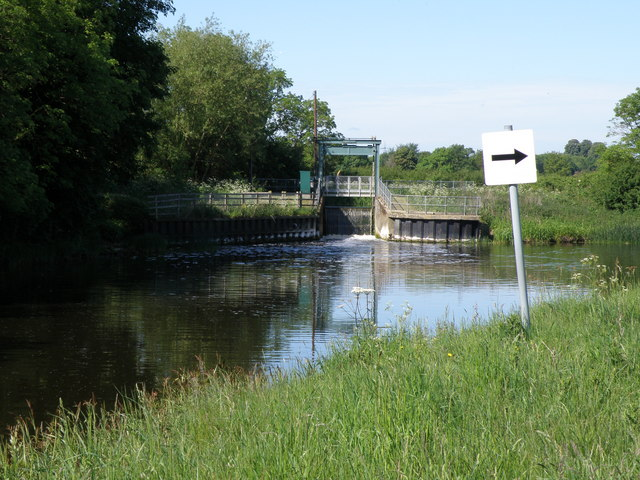
Alwalton weir on the Nene

The East of England Showground lies to the south of the village. The 240-acre (0.97 km^{2}) site was used for shows and commercial exhibitions. Until 2012 it was the home each June for the East of England Show and the home of the Peterborough Panthers Speedway team from 1970 to 2023.

The section of main dual-carriageway was opened on 15 December 1958. Construction had begun around July 1957, by R M Douglas of Erdington, to Water Newton, as part of an 8-mile (13 km), £600,000 section. Four people, from the same family, had been killed in an accident in August 1959, when a car from Kettering hit a 29-seater bus from Harrogate, at the dangerous staggered crossroads.

A Huntingdonshire Council meeting in November 1959 considered a bridge for the A605. There were draft plans for a bridge in April 1960, to be originally planned for around 1961, or to be constructed around the same time as the Alconbury bypass (opened December 1964). But in November 1965, the new Labour government informed the council that other British transport projects would take priority, instead. Traffic lights similar to those installed at Girtford could be built at Alwalton.

There were a series of fatal accidents throughout the 1960s at the staggered junction. In January 1968, Barbara Castle claimed that the Alwalton A605 bridge could not be started until the "Peterborough Master Plan" was completed. Construction finally started in July 1975. The bridge deck was built in January 1976, with 22 concrete box beams, 90 ft (27 m) long, weighing 50 tons each, lifted by Scotts Cranes. The bridge was built by Monk, costing £750,000. The bridge was opened on 5 May 1976.

== Notable people ==
Sir Henry Royce (27 March 1863 to 22 April 1933), the co-founder of Rolls-Royce, was born in the village and his ashes were buried in St Andrew's Church where a plaque has been placed on the wall as well on a spot on the floor, beneath which his ashes were buried in an urn. His remains were originally buried in 1933 beneath a statue of him at the Rolls-Royce works in Derby but in 1937 his urn was removed and brought to Alwalton.

Frank Perkins (20 February 1889 – 15 October 1967), founder of Perkins Engines, died at his home, Alwalton Hall, and is buried at St Andrew's Church.

From 1927 to 1937 Frank Buttle was rector of Chesterton with Haddon and Alwalton.
