= Norton Camp =

Bronze Age hillfort in Somerset, England

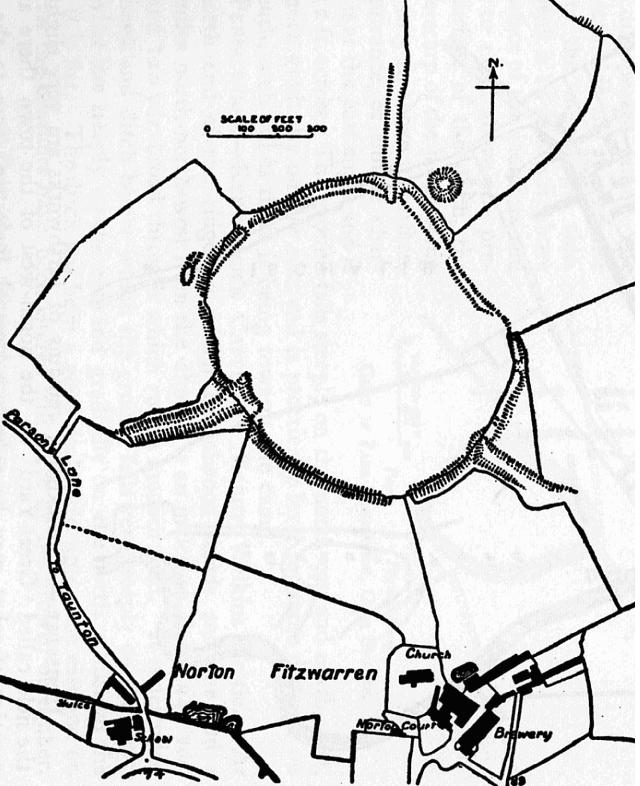
- Plan of earthworks at Norton Camp

- Location within Somerset
- 51°01′50″N 3°09′04″W
- Location: Norton Fitzwarren, Somerset, England

History
- Built: Bronze Age

Site notes
- Area: 5 hectares (12 acres)

Scheduled monument
- Official name: Norton Camp
- Reference no.: 189007

Norton Camp is a Bronze Age hill fort at Norton Fitzwarren near Taunton in Somerset, England.

== Background ==
Hill forts developed in the Late Bronze and Early Iron Age, roughly the start of the 1st millennium BCE. The reason for their emergence in Britain, and their purpose, has been a subject of debate. It has been argued that they could have been military sites constructed in response to invasion from continental Europe, sites built by invaders, or a military reaction to social tensions caused by an increasing population and consequent pressure on agriculture. The dominant view since the 1960s has been that the increasing use of iron led to social changes in Britain. Deposits of iron ore were located in different places to the tin and copper ore necessary to make bronze, and as a result trading patterns shifted and the old elites lost their economic and social status. Power passed into the hands of a new group of people. Archaeologist Barry Cunliffe believes that population increase still played a role and has stated "[the forts] provided defensive possibilities for the community at those times when the stress [of an increasing population] burst out into open warfare. But I wouldn't see them as having been built because there was a state of war. They would be functional as defensive strongholds when there were tensions and undoubtedly some of them were attacked and destroyed, but this was not the only, or even the most significant, factor in their construction".

== Description ==
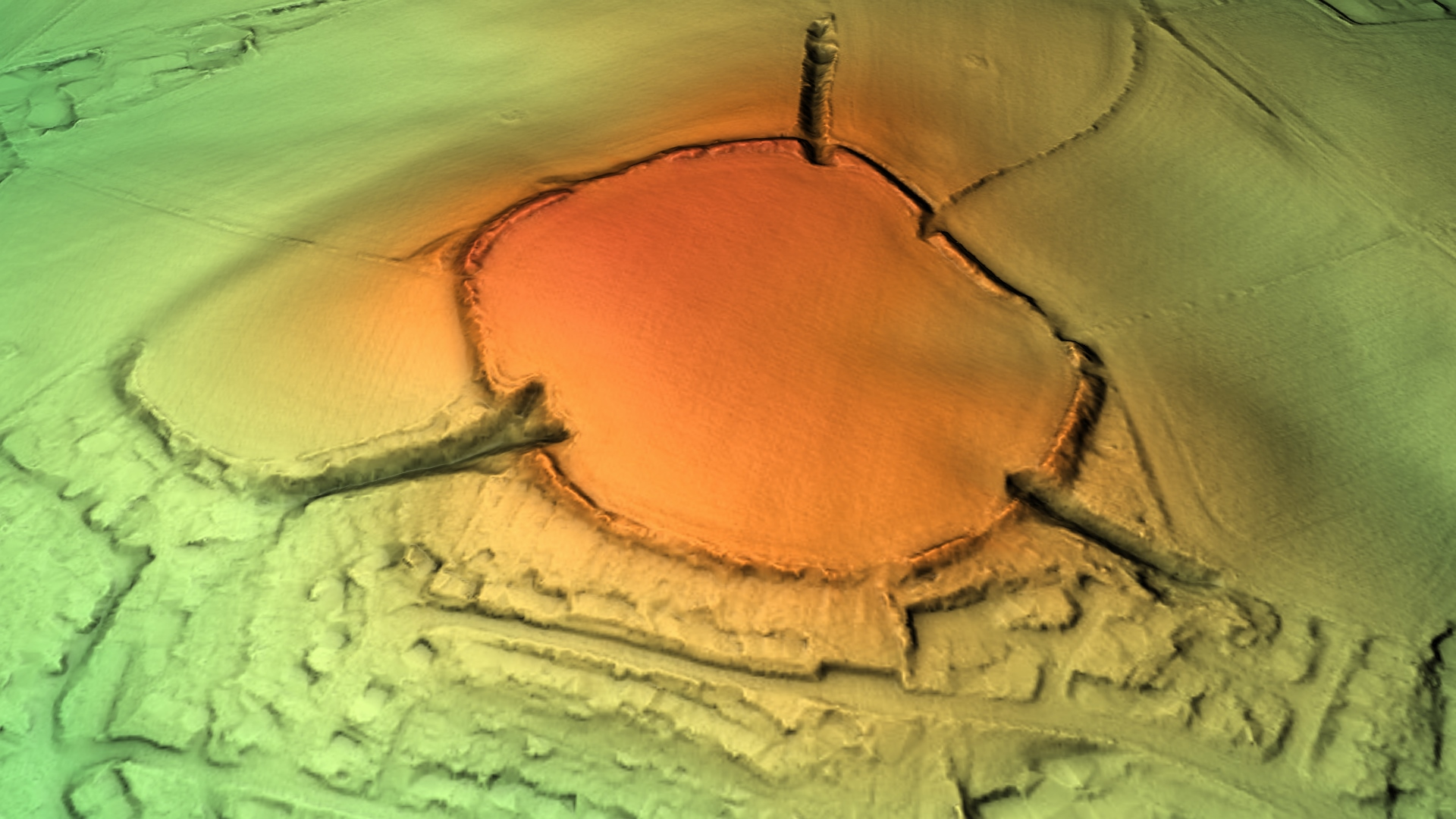
3D view of the digital terrain model

The earthwork consists of a single circular rampart (univallate) up to 3 m high, with three holloway entrances dominated by linear banks extending out from the main perimeter. The ring has a diameter of about 250 m (820 ft), enclosing an area of 5 hectares (12 acres). The fort is at the top of low hill 50 m (160 ft) about 1 km north of the River Tone.

== History ==
The site was excavated by Mr. H. St. George Gray in July 1908. The original ditch was shown to be 2.75 m (9 ft 0 in) deep. Pottery shards dated from the Bronze Age and the Roman period, but no evidence of occupation from other periods.

Further excavations in 1968–1971 by Nancy and Philip Langmaid found flints from the Mesolithic and Neolithic, as well as extensive hoards of bronze metalwork, 9 bracelets, an axe-head and sword moulds from the Bronze Age (700 BCE). They also found evidence of refortifiction in the Iron Age, from the period before Roman occupation (around 43 CE).

In 1981, a Neolithic axe-head made from greensand chert was found. There is further evidence from aerial photographs of cropmarks and post holes, possibly from roundhouses.

The site is next to Norton Manor Camp, home of 40 Commando, Royal Marines.

The Ancient Monument is included on the Heritage at Risk Register due to its vulnerability to arable ploughing.

In 2019 the site was bought by Somerset West and Taunton Council in collaboration with Somerset Heritage Trust. The whole site is now open to the public.

== See also ==
- List of hill forts and ancient settlements in Somerset
