= Operation RUMAN =

Operation Ruman was the British government's combined military and humanitarian operations in September 2017 to provide relief to the British Overseas Territories in the Caribbean affected by Hurricane Irma.

== Background ==
In early September 2017 Hurricane Irma swept across the Caribbean, causing catastrophic damage to the British Overseas Territories of Anguilla, the Turks and Caicos Islands and the British Virgin Islands. On 7 September Theresa May, the British Prime Minister, announced £32 million had been allocated to a relief fund to support those affected.

== Military ==
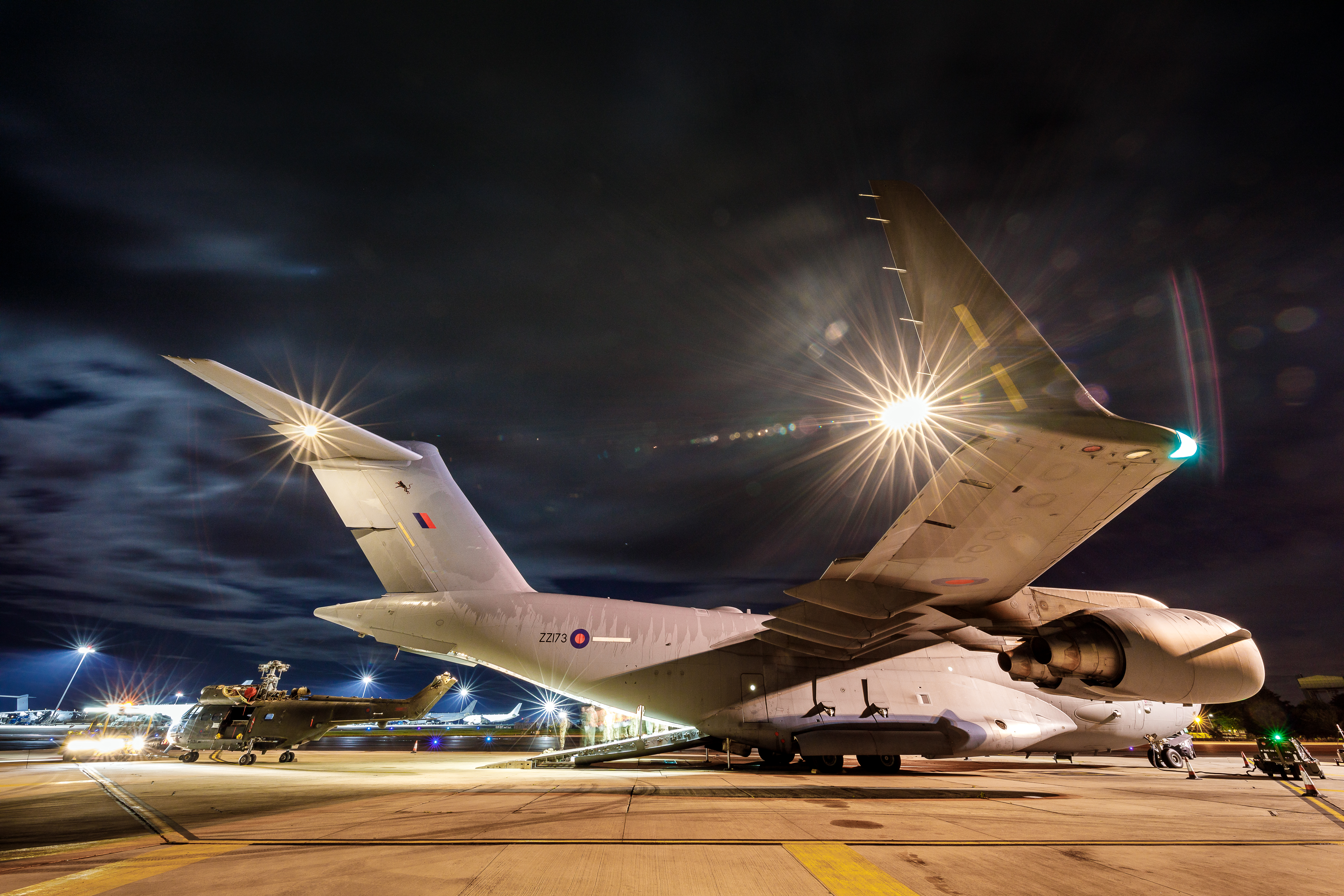
A Puma helicopter is loaded into a C-17 ahead of its deployment to the Caribbean.

Royal Fleet Auxiliary (RFA) ship Mounts Bay was deployed to the Caribbean in July 2017 in preparation for the 2017 hurricane season and was therefore able to render immediate assistance as the storm passed northwards. Mounts Bay's Wildcat helicopter and mexefloat were used to land equipment, 6 tonnes (6.6 tons) of supplies and personnel to provide medical and engineering support on Anguilla, including repairing the island's hospital and airport, before sailing overnight for the British Virgin Islands.

Following a meeting of the government's emergency committee, COBRA, on 7 September, Defence Secretary Sir Michael Fallon announced that the Royal Navy's flagship, the helicopter carrier HMS Ocean, including deployed aircraft from 845 Naval Air Squadron, would be diverted from her NATO deployment in the Mediterranean to provide assistance. Ocean arrived at Gibraltar on 11 September to embark supplies, including 4×4 vehicles and building materials donated by the Government of Gibraltar. Four Royal Air Force (RAF) Chinook helicopters carrying aid for embarkation in Gibraltar flew from RAF Benson via fuelling stops in San Sebastián and Sevilla in Spain; this was unusual because Spain normally blocks military flights from its territory and airspace if they are bound to Gibraltar; however due to the humanitarian nature of these flights clearance was granted .

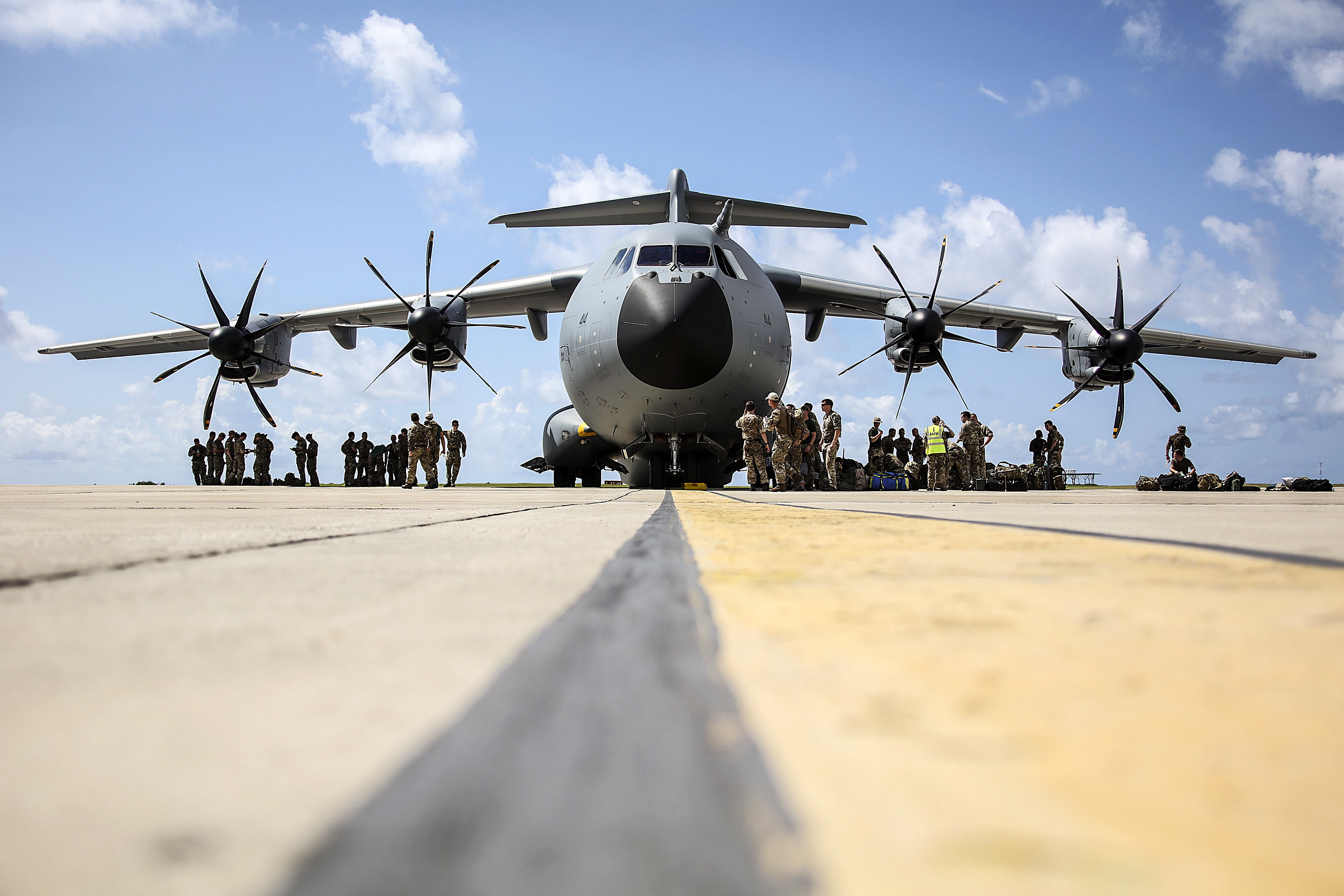
A Royal Air Force A400M Atlas in Barbados preparing to transport essential shelters to the British Virgin Islands.

On 8 September nearly 300 UK military personnel, including those from 40 Commando Royal Marines together with engineers and specialist personnel from all three Services departed RAF Brize Norton. RAF C17, Voyager and A400M aircraft were deployed carrying medical supplies and aid including emergency shelter kits, rations and clean water. The aircraft initially landed in Barbados, which is being used as a hub to distribute aid. The C17 continued its journey onto the US Virgin Islands – the island with the only usable runway in the region – with 85 personnel on board.

A further C17 left the UK on 9 September carrying an RAF Puma helicopter with an additional 2 Puma helicopters departing the following day.

By 12 September 997 British personnel were in the region, made up of marines, engineers, medics and specialists, including Royal Navy, Army and RAF personnel.

The commander for the operation was Brigadier John Ridge. Ridge countered criticism of the operation and said "the [operation presents] unique and vast geographical and logistical challenges".

With Hurricane Maria approaching on 18 September it was announced that the 1,300 British personnel already in the region would remain on the affected islands or in locations nearby to render immediate assistance. Additional personnel were deployed to Montserrat to provide assistance should Maria hit the island.

Ocean arrived in the region on 22 September and proceeded to conduct 253 hours of flying including 81 separate trips and moved more than 1,000 people by air. 9 Assault Squadron Royal Marines conducted almost 200 landing craft launches and recoveries, landing 600 people and stores across 17 isolated locations. In total, Ocean delivered 8,300 man hours of engineering and logistical support enabling the recovery of critical national infrastructure alongside large scale clean-up operations across four separate island chains. Ocean also evacuated 39 vulnerable British nationals from Dominica, one of whom was very seriously ill and received life-saving treatment on board.

By 10 October, the military effort was winding down, 40 Commando Royal Marines flew back to the United Kingdom and Ocean sailed for Miami for refueling and storing before resuming her NATO mission in the Mediterranean. Mounts Bay remained in the region to provide support for the remainder of the hurricane season.

== Civilian ==
On 8 September 2017, the Royal Cayman Islands Police Service Air Operations Unit in their EC135 helicopter departed Grand Cayman to pre-position at Guantanamo Naval Base, arriving in the tail of Irma. Following the all clear, the helicopter, callsign X-Ray One arrived at first light into Turks and Caicos and for 36 hours was the main aid to the Islands in assessing damage and transporting people, leading to the declaration of the state of emergency. X-Ray One crew stayed for seven days as part of Operation Ruman, making 36 flights, until relieved by a Canadian Navy Sea King.

Aid was supplied from Department for International Development's disaster response centre at Kemble Airfield in Gloucestershire, including 10,000 UK aid buckets and 5,000 UK solar lanterns.

53 police officers from 14 UK police forces were deployed to the British Virgin Islands to assist in maintaining law and order. A contingent of specialist prison officers were deployed to run the island's prison. In conjunction with military and police support 21 of the most high risk prisoners were transferred by air to a prison in St Lucia.
