= David Alexander (Royal Marines officer) =

Royal Marines general

Major-General David Alexander CB
- Born: David Crichton Alexander; 28 November 1926
- Died: 5 January 2017 (aged 90)
- Military career
- Allegiance: United Kingdom
- Branch: Royal Marines
- Service years: 1944–1977
- Rank: Major-General
- Commands: 40 Commando (1969–70)
- Conflicts: Second World War; Aden Emergency
- Awards: Companion of the Order of the Bath
- Other work: Commandant Scottish Police College (1979–87)

Major-General David Crichton Alexander CB (28 November 1926 – 5 January 2017) was a senior Royal Marines officer.

== Military career ==
He was educated at the Edinburgh Academy, and joined the Royal Marines in 1944.

Alexander served in the East Indies Fleet, and with 45 Commando, and in Malaya, Malta, and the Suez Canal Zone in 1951–1954. From 1954 to 1957 he was Parade Adjutant, RM Lympstone. He was then Equerry and acting Treasurer to the Duke of Edinburgh 1957–1960.

He attended the Royal Naval Staff College in 1960, and then was on the Directing Staff of the Staff College, Camberley 1962–1965. He was second in command of 45 Commando, in Aden, 1965–1966. In 1966–1969 he was on the staff of the Chief of the Defence Staff, including service with the Secretary of State.

In 1969–1970 he was in command of 40 Commando, in Singapore, and from 1970 to 1973 Colonel General Staff to the Commandant General Royal Marines.

After attending the Royal College of Defence Studies in 1974 he was promoted to major general and served as Commander Training Group Royal Marines 1975–1977.

Alexander retired from the Royal Marines in 1977, and was Director-General of the English-Speaking Union 1977–1979, and Commandant of the Scottish Police College 1979–1987.

Alexander was made a Companion of the Order of the Bath in 1976.

He died on 5 January 2017 at the age of 90.
