= Sociology of agriculture =

Discipline within sociology

Sociology of agriculture (also called the sociology of agriculture and food systems) is a discipline within sociology that studies the relationships between agriculture, society, and environment. It examines how agricultural production, distribution, and consumption are shaped by social, cultural, technological, economic, and political factors and how, in turn, agriculture shapes societies and ecosystems.

While much of the discipline's roots stem from rural sociology (e.g. rural-urban conflicts,rural health, education, community development, and social-structural trends) the sociology of agriculture is distinct in its specialization of farming communities, household-farm roles and dynamics, the persistence of family farms, the concentration and consolidation of industrial interests in agriculture, and the social influences of technological adoption or management practices in farming.

== History ==
=== Early roots and birth from rural sociology ===
The sociology of agriculture as a distinct subdiscipline came from a crisis within rural sociology, where the rigor of academic theory and political impact had grown stagnant. The study of agriculture from a sociological perspective emerged in the mid 20th century. For example, early work sought to understand how farm size, labor forms, and farm community life co-varied (e.g. the Goldschmidt Thesis).

=== Emergence of a "new" sociology of agriculture ===
From the 1970s to 1990s, researchers like William H. Friedland brought further focus on agricultural labor, specifically the working conditions of farmworkers and the industrialization of agriculture. Frederick H. Buttel (1945 to 2005) was a leading scholar whose work integrated political economy, environmental sociology, and science and technology studies to analyze agricultural structural change, state policy, and sustainability, helping define the "new" sociology of agriculture from the late 1970s to the early 2000s. Jim Hightower's Hard Tomatoes, Hard Times (1973) critiqued the land-grant university system's alignment with agribusiness (i.e. funding of industrial tomato production) and helped catalyze debates over power, accountability, and the political economy of U.S. agriculture within the emerging field. Reinhardt and Barlett (1989) explain the persistence of family farms in the United States by highlighting flexible household labor, diversified income strategies, tenure arrangements, policy supports, and cultural commitments to farming, challenging assumptions that industrialization would eliminate small and medium farms.

=== Pre-Soviet and early Soviet era ===
==== Peasant studies and the family farm ====
Alexander Chayanov, an impactful agricultural economist and sociologist in the pre-Soviet and early Soviet era, was best known for hsi theories about peasant economies and the family farm. He recognized and argued that family farms operate on a logic that is different from capitalist farms. He proferred that family farms were not out to maximize profit or productivity, but rather that they balanced their labor and their household needs, a unique social and economic dynamic that laid the groundwork for the sociology of agriculture.

=== France ===
In France, the sociology of agriculture has been shaped by figures like Henri Mendras, whose work on rural modernization and peasant society laid the foundation for understanding the transformation of agrarian life within broader social and political structures.

=== Brazil ===
In Brazil, the sociology of agriculture has been deeply influenced by studies of agrarian reform and rural social movements, particularly the Landless Workers' Movement (MST), which scholars have examined as a key force in contesting land inequality and shaping alternative models of sustainable agriculture.

== Key themes and concepts ==
=== Interdisciplinary ===
The sociology of agriculture is an inherently interdisciplinary field, drawing upon insights from economics, anthropology, environmental studies, and political science to provide a comprehensive understanding of how agricultural systems are embedded within broader societal structures. Rather than examining farming in isolation, the field investigates how social forces shape, and are shaped by food production, distribution, and consumption.

=== Conservation agriculture ===
Contemporary areas of focus include sustainability, food justice, climate change, and the transformation of rural life. As new challenges to address risk, resilience, and climate change emerge through solutions such as regenerative agriculture and precision farming emerge, the sociology of agriculture continues to evolve, offering dynamic frameworks to analyze these changing relationships.

=== Power dynamics ===
In the sociology of agriculture, analyses emphasize how control over land, capital, technology, and markets is unevenly distributed, with corporate consolidation in input and retail sectors shifting bargaining power away from producers toward a small number of firms. Evidence suggests that dynamics act through visible, hidden, and invisible forms of power that set agendas, establish standards, and determine whose knowledge is recognized in research, extension, and governance. Patterns of land concentration and tenure insecurity are thought to reproduce inequalities in participation and benefit sharing throughout the food system, while collective action, alternative market arrangements, and agroecological practices are thought to provide sites of resistance and reform.

=== Labor, migration, and social reproduction ===
Analyzes farm labor regimes, seasonal and undocumented migration, household labor, and care work, and how these underpin agricultural production and rural community life.

=== Cultural and political dimensions ===
The sociology of agriculture examines cultural meanings and practices associated with farming, including narratives about rural life, traditions surrounding food and land, and the ways these shape agricultural behavior and identities. The field also engages with the politics of food, addressing topics such as food sovereignty, food justice, and efforts to build more equitable food systems. In doing so, the sociology of agriculture links patterns of production and consumption to broader questions of social organization, community well-being, and environmental sustainability.

=== Urbanization and alternative food networks ===
Examines urban–rural linkages, peri-urban agriculture, and the rise of community-supported agriculture, farmers' markets, and short supply chains as sites of innovation and social change.

=== Gender and identity ===
Considers how gender, identity, class, race, ethnicity, and indigeneity structure access to land, inputs, labor markets, and decision-making, and how these intersections affect well-being and power.

== See also ==
- Agrarian society
- Agroecology
