= Commando 21 =

Commando 21 was the name given to the reorganisation of the Royal Marines' (RM) two battalion-sized Commando units; namely 40 Commando; and 45 Commando. 42 Commando having converted to a specialised maritime unit in 2017.

== The Commando 21 Organisation ==
Commando 21 organised each RM Commando unit into six sub-units, styled companies. Each company was subdivided into troops; note that a “troop” is the RM nomenclature for a platoon rather than for an individual soldier. The new structure was presented as giving the RM more firepower, more mobility, more information, more flexibility and more fighting power. According to open-sources each Stand Off Combat Company was to have a field strength of five officers and 78 other ranks, and each Close Combat Company was to have five officers and 98 other ranks. Under the Commando 21 re-organisation the overall strength of each of the three units was originally stated to be 692 all ranks.

The companies are:

Command Company
Main HQ
Tactical HQ
Reconnaissance Troop (includes a sniper section)
Mortar Troop (9 Barrels of 81 mm) (Includes 4 MFC pairs)
Anti-Tank (AT) Troop (Milan—to be replaced by Javelin ATGW)
Medium Machine Gun Troop
2X Close Combat Companies
Company Headquarters (Coy HQ)
3X Close Combat Troops (Troop HQ, 3 Rifle Sections, Manoeuvre Support Section)
2X Stand Off Companies
Company Headquarters (Coy HQ)
Heavy Machine Gun (HMG) Troop (0.5" heavy machine guns)
AT Troop
Close Combat Troop
One Logistic Company
A Echelon 1 (A Ech1)
A Echelon 2 (A Ech2)
FRT
RAP
B Echelon (B Ech)

=== Command Company ===
The Command Company is responsible for command, control, communications, computation, intelligence, surveillance, reconnaissance (C4ISR). It also was organised to include a machine gun troop, the unit’s mortar and anti-tank troops, together with the reconnaissance troop.

=== Logistics Support Company ===
The Logistic Support Company manages administrative and logistic activity.

=== Close Combat Companies ===
Each of the two Close Combat Company is similar to the previous RM rifle company, having 3 platoon sized troops, but each troop, in addition to three rifle sections, has a manoeuvre support section of five men equipped with General Purpose Machine Gun, Long Range Rifle and 81 mm Mortar.

=== Stand-Off Combat Companies ===
Each of the two Stand Off Combat Company has a Close Combat Troop identical to those in the Close Combat Companies. It also was organised to have an Anti-Tank Troop with 6 Javelin anti-tank weapons and a Heavy Machine Gun troop with 6 x 0.5in Heavy Machine Guns.

== Timescale ==
The restructuring was to have completed by summer 2003.
