= Gladwin Albert Hurst Buttle =

British pharmacologist

Gladwin Albert Hurst Buttle, OBE, FRCP (11 April 1899 – 3 May 1983), nicknamed “B”, was a British pharmacologist, and served as an officer in the British Army in both the Royal Engineers and the Royal Army Medical Corps. In the latter he was key to the development of an effective blood transfusion service. He was also the first chairman of the Buttle Trust for Children (now known as Buttle UK).

== Early life and education ==
Gladwin Buttle was born in Woldingham, Surrey on 11 April 1899. He was the youngest of six children (five boys and one girl), his eldest brother being Frank Buttle. His parents were William Buttle, a solicitor, and Mary Wilby. He started his education at Miss Brown’s of Warlingham before going on to Whitgift School.

In 1915 he decided to become a regular officer in the Royal Engineers. He studied at the Royal Military Academy, Woolwich and was commissioned into the Royal Engineers as a Second Lieutenant in September 1918.

In October 1919, having decided to study medicine, he resigned his commission and went up to St John’s College, Cambridge. After finishing the Tripos he entered University College Hospital and qualified MRCS, LRCP (Licentiate of the Royal College of Physicians) in 1924.

== Early career ==
At Cambridge Buttle met John Gaddum, who also attended University College Hospital after Cambridge. He went on to work at the Wellcome Research Laboratories in Beckenham and persuaded Buttle to join him there.

Buttle worked there for fourteen years, working first on digitalis and local anaesthetics, and then on the control of streptococcal infections. He obtained the drug Prontosil from Gerhard Domagk of Bayer and after some unsuccessful tests he successfully experimented with using it against streptococci taken from cases of puerperal sepsis. In 1936 he treated a woman dying of puerperal sepsis with the active part of Prontosil, sulphanilamide, and she recovered.

He conducted further experiments using sulphanilamide and its derivatives in the treatment of meningococcal and gonococcal infections. He also worked on leprosy, and in 1937 tried diaminodiphenyl sulphone (dapsone) on himself, obtaining antibacterial properties in his blood but his paper on the value and safety of a low dose of the sulphone was overlooked for many years.

== Second World War ==
Buttle later wrote that his work at the Wellcome Laboratories:

Ended suddenly in 1939. I had gone to New York to talk on sulfanilamide. When the war started, I came back at once as I was on the regular army reserve in the Royal Engineers. I met Lionel Whitby who suggested that I joined him in the Blood Transfusion Service, and I was eventually transferred to the Royal Army Medical Corps.

He became responsible for blood transfusion and resuscitation services in the British Army in the Middle East, and later in western Europe. In both theatres Buttle worked under Deputy Director of Pathology John Boyd. Buttle arrived in Cairo on 14 August 1940, and he took over control of blood transfusion on 4 September 1940. Over time he came to recognise that, unlike air raid victims suffering from crush injuries, battle casualties needed transfusion with whole blood, rather than plasma, if they were to undergo effective early surgery under anaesthesia. Buttle adapted gin and whisky bottles from officers' messes in Cairo and procured other equipment locally to enable the transfusion service to meet the needs of the Army. He was protected and supported by Boyd in these activities. Buttle would later say of Boyd:

He was quite wonderful in getting the work done in spite of local difficulties and sometimes lack of cooperation by the authorities in London. I could ask him about any difficulties and he always found the solution to the problems. He helped us to find suitable personnel from medical depots and materials from local sources.

Boyd’s view was that “it was much easier to give Buttle what he wanted straight away, than to be forced to do so a week or two later and have to apologise for the delay”. In 1941 Buttle was mentioned in dispatches and in 1942 he was appointed OBE for his contribution to war medicine. The OBE citation stated:

This officer came to Middle East in August 1940 as Adviser in Blood Transfusion and Officer i/c No. 1 Base Mobile Refrigerator Unit. From that time, when no real experience of transfusion under war conditions existed, and supplies of equipment were negligible, he has devoted himself untiringly to building up the Blood Transfusion Service in Middle East. He produced from an insignificant nucleus the present extensive Base Transfusion Unit. Some idea of the work carried out by the Base and Field Units may be gathered from the fact that, at the peak of the present battle, as many as 350 pints of blood have been sent forward in a day. It is impossible to compute the number of lives saved by this means but they are many. These results would have been impossible but for the foresight and initiative of Lt-Col. Buttle, who has overcome obstacles which to most would have appeared insuperable.

In 1941 Buttle was involved in saving Orde Wingate’s life by blood transfusion. Frank Ellis later wrote:

We returned from dinner at the Turf Club to the fifteenth Scottish general hospital (his base) to be told that there was an unconscious man in the operating theatre. He had cut his throat in a hotel and had lost a lot of blood. Buttle said, "Give him some O blood, while I find out who he is." After nearly three pints the patient was coming round and getting restless. Buttle returned and said, "Catch your train back to Alexandria; I will take over." I asked, "Who is he?" He replied, "Orde Wingate”.

At the end of 1943 Buttle was sent to Carthage to help treat Winston Churchill’s bronchial infection. After the war Heneage Ogilvie, who had been Consultant Surgeon Middle East, wrote that:

The greatest surgical advance of this war, more important even than penicillin, is the development of the transfusion service. This advance we owe entirely to two British officers - Brig. Sir Lionel Whitby, who designed the instrument, and Lieut.-Col. G. A. Buttle, who taught us how to use it. It was in the Middle East, during the thrust of the Eighth Army across Africa from Alamein to Tunis, that the provision of whole blood to the forward operating units was first organized on a satisfactory scale, and that the life-saving importance of early, rapid, and adequate restoration of blood volume in haemorrhage and shock was first learnt.

== Post-war career ==
In October 1945, Buttle was appointed Wellcome professor of pharmacology at the College of the Pharmaceutical Society, in Bloomsbury Square ('The Square') which in 1949 became the School of Pharmacy of the University of London. He held this position until he retired in 1966. While at the Square, for the first two years he continued his research on the chemotherapy of bacterial disease, and then carried out work on the immunological aspects, and chemotherapy, of cancer. He also taught pharmacology at Barts from 1948 to 1960, was on the Committee of the British Pharmacological Society twice, 1947-50 and 1960-63, and was on the Editorial Board of Pharmacological Reviews, 1956-62. In 1950, Buttle was nominated, with Jacques and Thérèse Tréfouël, for the Nobel Prize in Chemistry.

After retiring he became professor emeritus of pharmacology of the University of London, in 1968 spent some time as consultant in the pre-clinical teaching of veterinary students in Mexico City on behalf of the Food and Agriculture Organization, and then was professor of pharmacology in Addis Ababa 1972-74 and in Riyadh 1974-78. On his return to the UK in 1978 he became a consultant at the Wellcome Laboratories, where he had started his career.

He was an examiner in pharmacology in many universities, a member of the British Pharmaceutical Codex Action and Uses Committee, the Medical Research Council Drug Safety Committee, the Colonial Office leprosy committee, and the Ministry of Agriculture food additives committee; and was a civilian consultant to the Ministry of Defence (Army).

In 1970 he was elected as a Fellow of the Royal College of Physicians (FRCP) under the bye-law which provides for the election to the fellowship of "Persons holding a medical qualification, but not members of the College, who have distinguished themselves in the practice of medicine, or in the pursuit of Medical or General Science or Literature".

In 1981 he was made an honorary member of the British Pharmacological Society as part of the Society’s 50^{th} anniversary celebrations.

== Personal ==
Buttle married Eva Korella, a painter from Danzig, in 1936. They had one son, Richard.

His eldest brother Frank was an Anglican clergyman who over the 30 years before his death in 1953 built up a fund of around £920,000 (equivalent to about £23 million in April 2026). This fund was used to establish the Buttle Trust for Children. Buttle served as the first chairman of the Trust from 1953 until 1974.
