= RM Norton Manor =

Royal Marines base in Somerset, England

Norton Manor Camp
- Near Norton Fitzwarren, Somerset in England
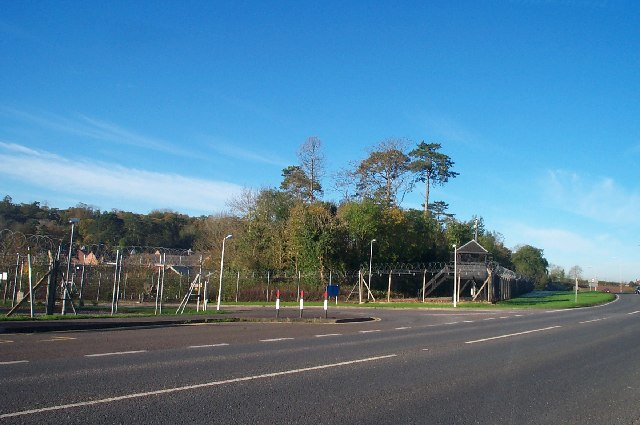
- Entrance to Norton Manor Camp

Site information
- Type: Royal Marines Base
- Owner: Ministry of Defence
- Operator: Royal Navy
- Controlled by: Royal Marines
- Condition: Operational
- Website: RM Norton Manor - Royal Navy

Location
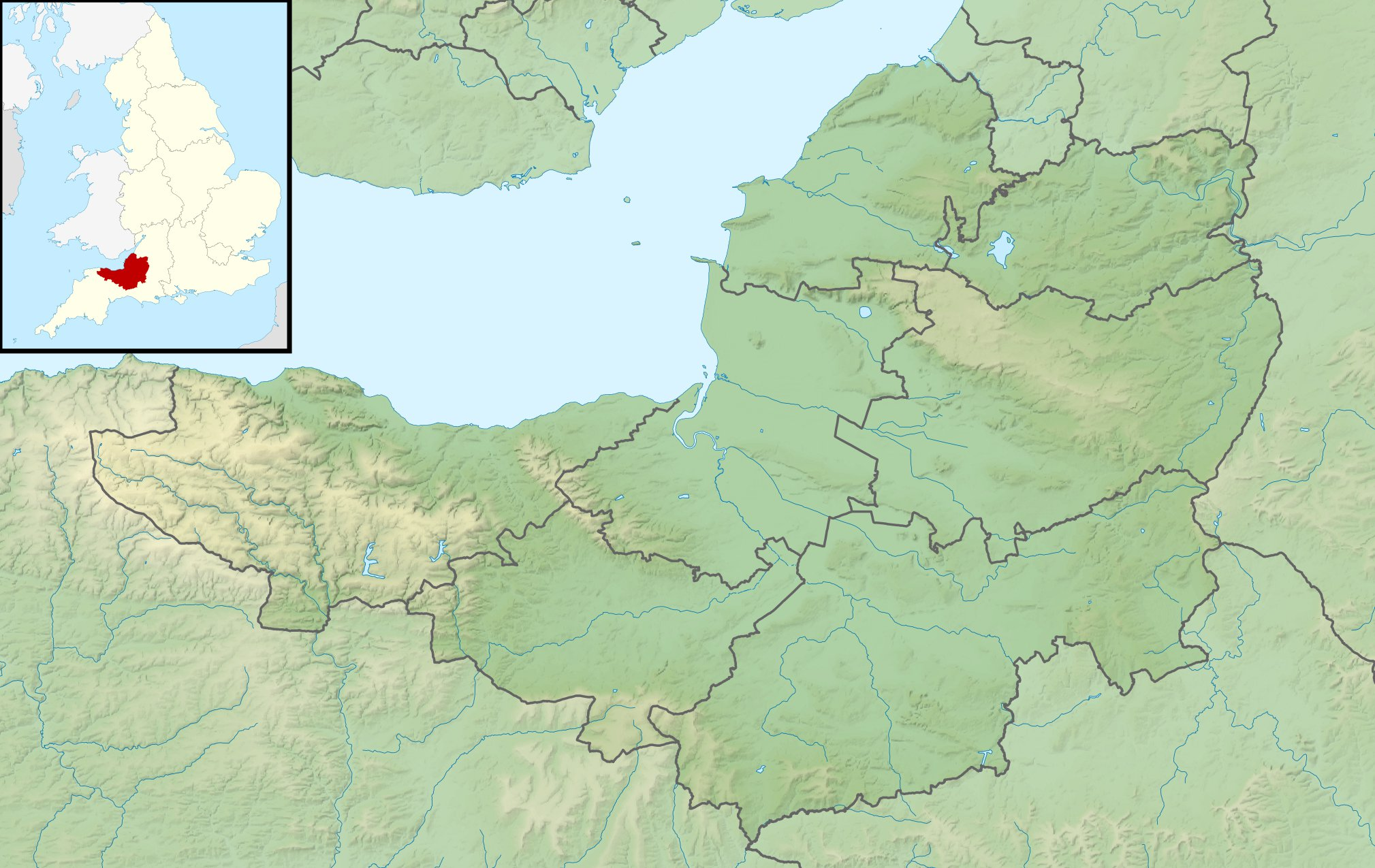
- Location in Somerset Norton Manor Camp (the United Kingdom)
- Coordinates: 51°02′13″N 003°09′17″W
- Area: 66 hectares

Site history
- Built: 1940
- Built for: War Office
- Built by: Royal Army Service Corps/US Army
- In use: 1940 – present

Garrison information
- Occupants: 40 Commando Royal Marines

Airfield information
- Elevation: 33 metres (108 ft) AMSL
Helipads
Number	Length and surface
01	15 x 15m Concrete

Norton Manor Camp, or RM Norton Manor, is a Royal Marines base located near Norton Fitzwarren, 2 miles (3.2 km) north west of Taunton, Somerset, in England. It is home to 40 Commando.

In 2016, the government announced that Norton Manor Camp would be closed by 2028. However, this decision was reversed in February 2019 following a successful local campaign.

== History ==
=== Norton Camp ===
Norton Camp is a large hillfort, and shows evidence of occupation from neolithic times. Thought to have been on the boundary between two tribes, it is one of the earliest sites of permanent human occupation within the Taunton area. It was later occupied through the Bronze Age to the Roman occupation of the local area.

By the early 18th century, the land around the hill was owned by Norton Manor. Silk mills had occupied the Taunton side of the brook that marked the parish boundary, while in the early 20th century the Norton side had been developed as parkland, or left as farmland.

=== Second World War ===
==== Logistics depot ====
With the outbreak of the Second World War, the British Army were in desperate need of modern logistics facilities: Norton Fitzwarren is on the former Bristol and Exeter Railway ('B&ER') mainline, which was operated by the B&ER until 1 January 1876 when it was amalgamated with the Great Western Railway.

The station became an important junction station, with access within an hour to:

- North: Bristol, Cardiff and Gloucester, then onwards to the industrial Midlands
- South: Exeter, and hence to HMNB Devonport
- East: Yeovil and the LSWR mainline, onwards to all of the major south coast ports, including Portsmouth and Southampton
- West: branch lines to Minehead and Barnstaple

Resultantly, the station for a relatively small village was quite extensive, having two island platforms creating four platforms. Thanks also to the extensive local silk mills, there were also extensive existing freight handling facilities within the Fairwater Yard, a large regional freight yard located south of the mainline.

==== US Army G50 depot ====
Commissioned by the Royal Army Service Corps after completion as a logistics and distribution depot for them in early 1941, the United States Army took over Norton Manor Camp as part of Operation Bolero in 1942, one of their 18 supplies depots within the United Kingdom. Redesignated Quartermaster General Depot G-50, they equipped it with extensive railway sidings to the north-east of the railway station. Part of the reasoning behind the choice of the depot was that it was one of five within the 18 designated as a US Army Medical Corps supplies depot. Medical supplies were allocated 110,680 square feet (10,283 m^{2}) of under cover storage, and a further 25,000 square feet (2,300 m^{2}) outside. The US Army also locally developed the 67th General Hospital at Musgrove Park. Both facilities under the control of the US Army Medical Corps came into operation on 1 September 1942.

==== Prisoner of War Camp: No. 665 Cross Keys ====
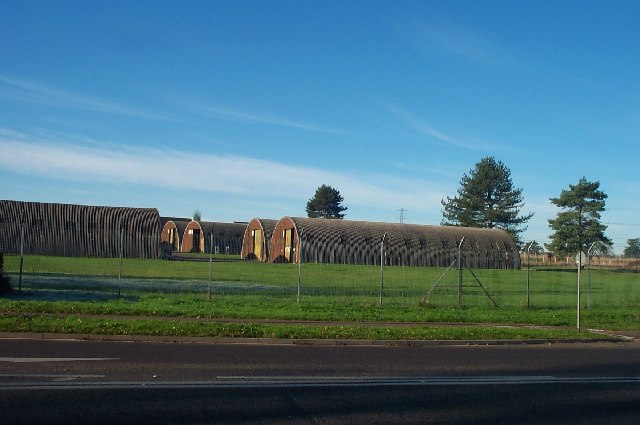
Nissen huts erected as part of the PoW camp, which later became part of the larger British Army base

In 1941, the British Army established a 300-person Prisoner of War (POW) camp on a northern part of the site at Burnshill, designated POW Camp No.665 Cross Keys. Initially housing Italian Army prisoners from the Western Desert Campaign, it later housed German prisoners post the Battle of Normandy.

=== Post War Ordnance Depot (1945–1978) ===
After the end of hostilities, the US Army handed the base back to the British Army. Re-designated No.3 Supply Reserve Depot, the Army equipped it with a civil workforce, who were charged with sourcing, buying and then packing various supplies packs, mainly ration food but also other supplies, for British Army units stationed around the world.

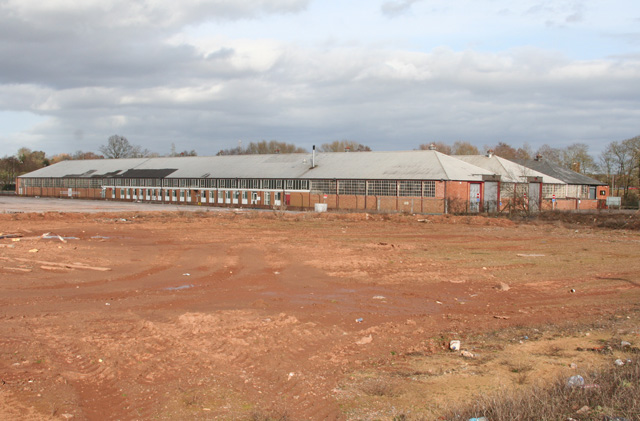
One of the former supply depot buildings

Despite extensive lobbying by local Member of Parliament Edward du Cann on the Under-Secretary of State for Defence for the Army Merlyn Rees, the decision was made to close the depot in 1966. With the branch-line to Barnstaple also closing under the Beeching cuts, the station at Norton Fitzwarren was closed by British Railways in October 1961.

=== British Army training base (1950–1983) ===
The northern part of the camp was separated from the ordnance depot after the war and took the name Norton Manor Camp. From 1950 until 1961, it was home to 8 (Basic Trades) Training Battalion of the Royal Electrical and Mechanical Engineers (REME).

From the early 1960s to the late 1970s, the base was the main camp of the Junior Leaders Regiment of the Royal Army Service Corps, later Royal Corps of Transport from 1965.

=== Royal Marines operational base (1983–present) ===
In 1983, 40 Royal Marines Commando moved from Seaton Barracks, Plymouth, where they had been based since their return from Singapore in 1971, into Norton Manor Camp, which became the base for an operational unit for the first time in its history.

=== Redevelopment ===
The western part of the site close to the railway was sold off to either commercial developers (including a new production site for Taunton Blackthorn Cider), re-utilised as a trading estate, or sold onwards to Taunton Deane Borough Council for redevelopment as housing.

By the early 21st century, agreement was reached to redevelop the site again. Only four of the original Army supply depot warehouses now survive, with the rest demolished to build a new trading estate, 500 new homes, and a new road system to bypass Norton Fitzwarren.

=== Planned closure ===
In 2016, the government announced that Norton Manor Camp would be closed by 2028.

However, following a successful campaign by Taunton Deane MP Rebecca Pow and Liberal Democrat parliamentary candidate Gideon Amos, it was announced in February 2019 that the decision to close Norton Manor Camp had been reversed and the camp would remain operational indefinitely.

== Based units ==
Notable units based at Norton Manor Camp.

=== Royal Navy ===
Royal Marines (UK Commando Force)

- 40 Commando

== Role and operations ==
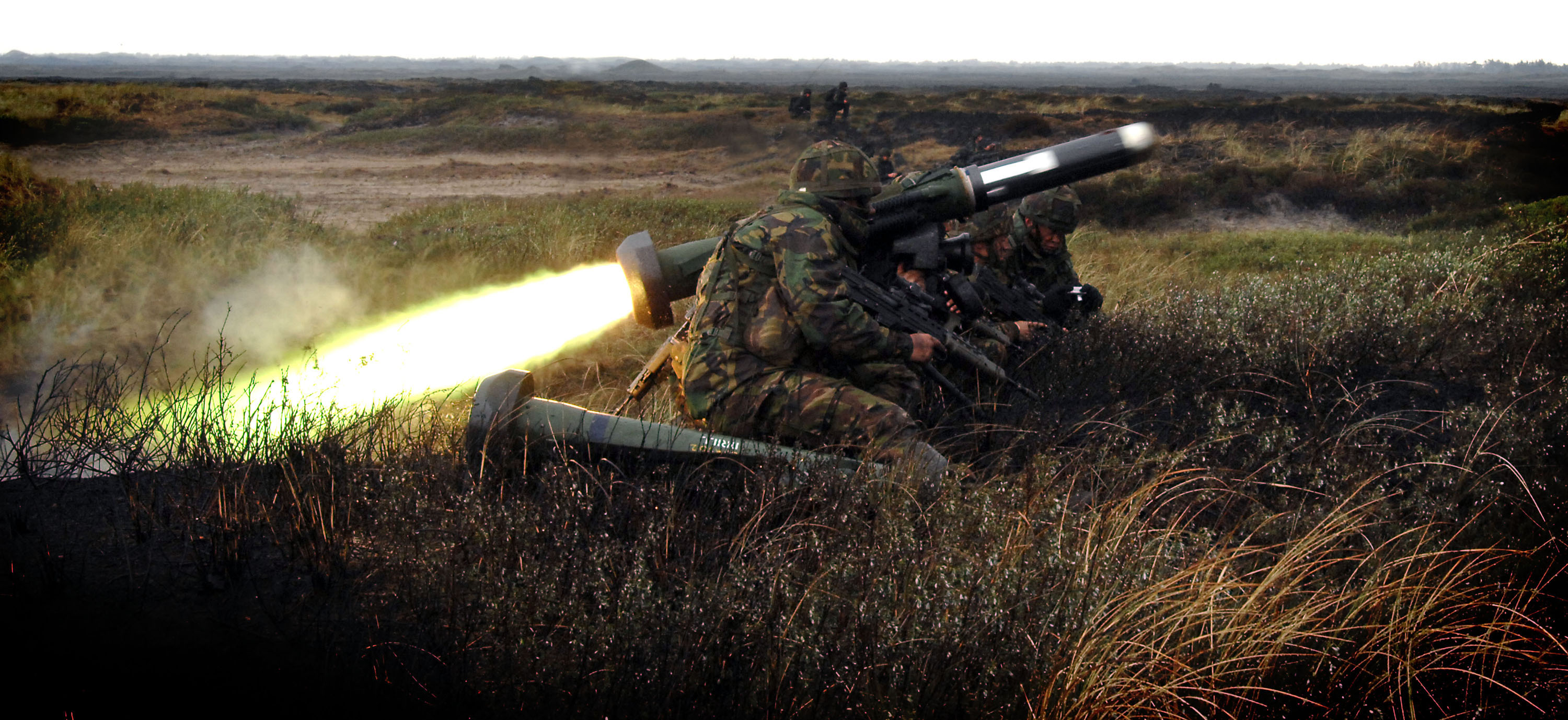
Royal Marines of 40 Commando firing a FGM-148 Javelin anti-tank missile.

With easy access to the ideal combined training territory contained within the Blackdown and Quantock Hills, as well as the Somerset Levels, from 1983 the camp has been home to 40 Commando, Royal Marines.

The base is fully supporting of the Marines and their families, providing a range of accommodation suites and houses; a medical centre; dental surgery; education centre; library; internet suite; RI shop; Naafi/Spar shop and families centre.

Refreshed and in part rebuilt, the camp includes extensive fitness and gymnasium facilities, with: a large fully equipped gymnasium; separate indoor arena for football and basketball; indoor swimming pool and squash and tennis courts. Outside is a climbing tower; an all-weather pitch; individual pitches for both football and rugby; and a camp perimeter circuit track.

=== Shoulder to Shoulder ===
In 2010, the Somerset County Gazette launched the "Shoulder to Shoulder" campaign, allowing local people to directly support 40 Commando. The campaign received backing from the UK Government, and from Foreign Office Minister Alistair Burt and former Taunton Deane MP and fellow Foreign Office Minister Jeremy Browne.
