= Chesterton, Huntingdonshire =

Village in Cambridgeshire, England

Coordinates: 52.54°N 0.34°W

Chesterton
- Location within Cambridgeshire
- Population: 317 (Including Water Newton 2011)
- OS grid reference: TL125949
- District: Huntingdonshire
- Shire county: Cambridgeshire
- Region: East
- Country: England
- Sovereign state: United Kingdom
- Post town: Peterborough
- Postcode district: PE7
- Police: Cambridgeshire
- Fire: Cambridgeshire
- Ambulance: East of England
- UK Parliament: North West Cambridgeshire

Chesterton is a small village and civil parish of exactly 56 households in Cambridgeshire, England. The village lies approximately 5 miles (8 km) west-southwest of central Peterborough, near the city's Alwalton district. Chesterton is situated within Huntingdonshire which is a non-metropolitan district of Cambridgeshire as well as being a historic county of England.

In the 17th century, Chesterton was the home of John Dryden's family, who lived in Chesterton manor.

In the 1870s, Chesterton was described as

"a parish in the district of Peterborough and county of Huntingdon; on the verge of the county, and on Ermine-street and the river Nen, 2½ miles SE of Castor r. station, and 5½ SW of Peterborough. Post town, Castor, under Peterborough. Acres, 1, 330. Real property, £2, 447. Pop., 129. Houses, 22."

== History ==
Chesterton is rich in Roman history, with the name Chesterton meaning "Roman site farm/settlement". MR A. Guest presents the Romans appearance as impressive, when he states "The Roman colonisation of the parish was impressive. Their first appearance was military, a five acre fort at Water Newton on the North border of Chesterton, which was built in the mid first century to guard the crossing of the Nene. A Civil settlement soon appeared at the gates of the fort, this became Chesterton with its North and West boundary being the River Nene and Billings Brook respectively. Durobrivae was contained within this boundary, with a Roman Signal Station at its highest point near its Southern border." Another Roman feature in Chesterton is Chesterton mound, which is described as a 'Roman earthen barrow situated 380m north of Hill Farm on the crest of Chesterton Hill south of the remains of the Roman town Durobrivae. "There have been suggestions that the mound was used as a "Roman signal station and a Medieval beacon".

In 1085 William the Conqueror ordered that a survey should be carried out across his kingdom to discover who owned which parts and what it was worth. The survey took place in 1086 and the results were recorded in what, since the 12th century, has become known as the Domesday Book. Starting with the king himself, for each landholder within a county there is a list of their estates or manors; and, for each manor, there is a summary of the resources of the manor, the amount of annual rent that was collected by the lord of the manor both in 1066 and in 1086, together with the taxable value.

Chesterton was listed in the Domesday Book in the Hundred of Normancross in Huntingdonshire; the name of the settlement was written as Cestretune in the Domesday Book. In 1086 there were two manors at Chesterton; the annual rent paid to the lords of the manors in 1066 had been £8 and the rent had fallen to £6 in 1086.

The Domesday Book does not explicitly detail the population of a place but it records that there was 21 households at Chesterton. There is no consensus about the average size of a household at that time; estimates range from 3.5 to 5.0 people per household. Using these figures then an estimate of the population of Chesterton in 1086 is that it was within the range of 73 and 105 people.

The Domesday Book uses a number of units of measure for areas of land that are now unfamiliar terms, such as hides and ploughlands. In different parts of the country, these were terms for the area of land that a team of eight oxen could plough in a single season and are equivalent to 120 acres (49 hectares); this was the amount of land that was considered to be sufficient to support a single family. By 1086, the hide had become a unit of tax assessment rather than an actual land area; a hide was the amount of land that could be assessed as £1 for tax purposes. The survey records that there were nine ploughlands at Chesterton in 1086 and that there was the capacity for a further five ploughlands. In addition to the arable land, there was 40 acres (16 hectares) of meadows at Chesterton.

The tax assessment in the Domesday Book was known as geld or danegeld and was a type of land-tax based on the hide or ploughland. It was originally a way of collecting a tribute to pay off the Danes when they attacked England, and was only levied when necessary. Following the Norman Conquest, the geld was used to raise money for the King and to pay for continental wars; by 1130, the geld was being collected annually. Having determined the value of a manor's land and other assets, a tax of so many shillings and pence per pound of value would be levied on the land holder. While this was typically two shillings in the pound the amount did vary; for example, in 1084 it was as high as six shillings in the pound. For the manors at Chesterton the total tax assessed was nine geld. By 1086 there was already a church and a priest at Chesterton.

In 1933 Chesterton had electricity. However piped water was not installed into the village until 1939, which meant villagers had to use water from the local Billing Brook. This eventually led to a sewage system being completed in 1969.

== Government ==
Chesterton does not have a parish council but has an annual parish meeting.

Chesterton was in the historic and administrative county of Huntingdonshire until 1965. From 1965, the village was part of the new administrative county of Huntingdon and Peterborough. Then in 1974, following the Local Government Act 1972, Chesterton became a part of the county of Cambridgeshire.

The second tier of local government is Huntingdonshire District Council which is a non-metropolitan district of Cambridgeshire and has its headquarters in Huntingdon. Huntingdonshire District Council has 52 councillors representing 29 district wards. Huntingdonshire District Council collects the council tax, and provides services such as building regulations, local planning, environmental health, leisure and tourism. Chesterton is a part of the district ward of Elton and Folksworth and is represented on the district council by one councillor. District councillors serve for four-year terms following elections to Huntingdonshire District Council.

For Chesterton the highest tier of local government is Cambridgeshire County Council which has administration buildings in Cambridge. The county council provides county-wide services such as major road infrastructure, fire and rescue, education, social services, libraries and heritage services. Cambridgeshire County Council consists of 69 councillors representing 60 electoral divisions. Chesterton is part of the electoral division of Norman Cross and is represented on the county council by two councillors.

At Westminster Chesterton is in the parliamentary constituency of North West Cambridgeshire, and elects one Member of Parliament (MP) by the first past the post system of election. Chesterton is represented in the House of Commons by Shailesh Vara (Conservative). Shailesh Vara has represented the constituency since 2005. The previous member of parliament was Brian Mawhinney (Conservative) who represented the constituency between 1997 and 2005.

== Demography ==
The occupational data of Chesterton in 1881, shown in the graph to the right, presents the majority of females as not having a " Specified Occupation". Compare this to the side which presents data for the male population in Chesterton in 1881, it presents all of the males within the village being in some sort of recognised occupation.

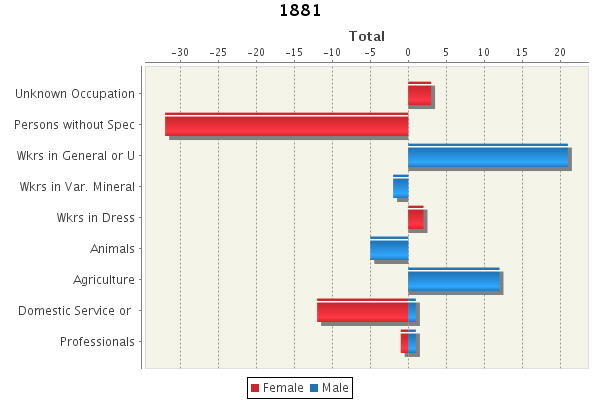
Occupational Data of 1881 for Chesterton

According to the 2011 census, Chesterton (including Haddon) had a population of 317, with their main industry being in the Wholesale and Retail Trade. Compare this to the Chesterton of 1831, where the population was only 105 and 66% of the industry in Chesterton was in the agricultural industry. In 2011, the total number of households in Chesterton was 139. This compared to the number of households in the village in 1831, which was 21 households shows clear signs of development in the village to increase the number of households. The population density in Chesterton was measured at 0.2 (Numbers of people per hectare) in the 2011 Census. This is seen to be drastically under the national average in England which is 4.1 ( Numbers of people per hectare). Also in Chesterton, the percentage of people who stated their religion as Christian in the 2011 Census was also higher than the national average, with the percentage of the population who were Christians in Chesterton at 75.7% and the national average in England being 59.4%.

== Education ==
Chesterton has no schools in the village itself. However it has several schools located within the local area. It has 2 primary schools located within a radius 1.5 miles from the village. These schools are Orton Wistow Primary School and Matley Primary School. Both these schools are for children aged 4–11 years old. An Ofsted report in 2011 gave Orton Wistow primary school a rating of "Good." An Ofsted report in 2013 for Matley Primary school rated the school as "Requires Improvement." The nearest secondary school is located 1.4 miles away from the village and is called Ormiston Bushfield Academy. The school is for children aged 11–19 years old. An Ofsted report in May 2012 rated the school as "Good"

== Religious sites ==
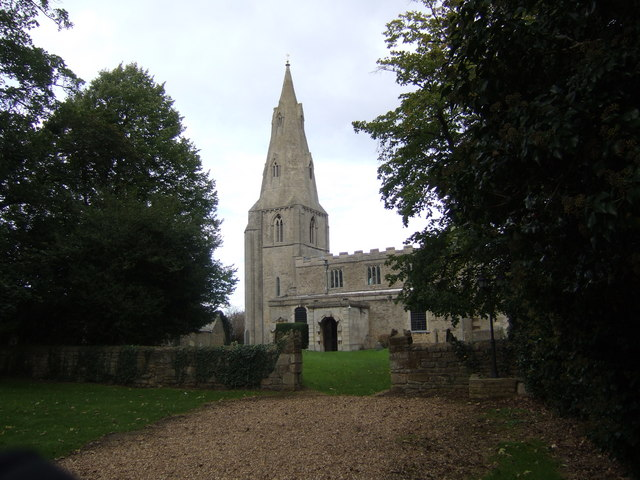
The Church of St Michael Chesterton – geograph.org.uk – 265404

St Michael's church, which is located on the north side of the village dates back to the 13th century and has monuments of the Lord of the Chesterton Manor, which belonged to the Beville family. Also St Michael's is where the tomb of William Beville who died in 1487 is located. The Beville family built Chesterton manor in the 1600s with Robert Beville building the manor; however, the family acquired the land in which the manor was built in 1378 after "the Norman Conquest" and the marriage of John Beville and Agnes Walderchef, until the manor was passed on to the Dryden family at a later date. From 1927 to 1937 the Rev Frank Buttle was rector of Chesterton with Haddon and Alwalton.
