= Frederick H. Buttel =

American sociologist

- Born: October 15, 1948; Freeport, Illinois
- Died: January 14, 2005 (aged 56); Madison, Wisconsin
- Education: University of Wisconsin–Madison
- Spouse: Pamela Clinkenbeard
- Scientific career
- Fields: Sociology (agriculture, environment)
- Workplaces: University of Wisconsin–Madison; Cornell University
- Thesis: Class Conflict, Environmental Conflict, and the Environmental Movement: The Social Bases of Mass Environmental Beliefs, 1968–1974 (1975)

Frederick Howard Buttel (October 15, 1948, Freeport, Illinois – January 14, 2005, Madison, Wisconsin) was the William H. Sewell Professor of Rural Sociology at the University of Wisconsin–Madison. A prominent scholar of the sociology of agriculture, Buttel was also well known for his contributions to environmental sociology.

== Early life ==
Buttel was "born on a dairy farm [in northwestern Illinois] to Heye R. and Marian (Highbarger) Buttel". His father was a farmer, his mother a school teacher.

== Education and career ==
Buttel earned his B.S. (1970) and M.S. in sociology (1972) degrees at the University of Wisconsin–Madison, his master's degree in forestry and environmental studies at Yale University and his Ph.D. in sociology at the University of Wisconsin. Prior to returning as a faculty member to Wisconsin, he served as a member of the faculty at Michigan State University and Cornell University. At the latter, he directed the Biology and Society Program.

Buttel was editor of the journal, Research in Rural Sociology and Development, and co-editor of Society & Natural Resources. Buttel was a scholar in rural sociology whose research focused on four major areas of study: the sociology of agriculture, environmental sociology, technological change in agriculture, and national and global activism relating to environmental and agricultural policies.

== Offices and awards ==
- Fellow, American Association for the Advancement of Science, 1987
- President, Rural Sociological Society, 1990–1991
- Excellence in Research Award, Rural Sociology Society, 1993
- Distinguished Contribution to Environmental Sociology Award, Section on Environment and Technology, American Sociological Association, 1994
- Chair, Department of Rural Sociology, University of Wisconsin-Madison, 1998–2002
- President, Agriculture, Food and Human Values Society, 1998–1999
- President, Research Committee on Environment and Society (RC24), International Sociological Association, 1998–2002
- Merit Award, Natural Resources Research Group, Rural Sociology Society, 1999
- Spitz Land-Grant Faculty Award, College of Agricultural and Life Sciences, University of Wisconsin-Madison, 2004
- Distinguished Rural Sociologist Award, Rural Sociology Society, 2004
- Wisconsin Alumni Research Foundation Professor, University of Wisconsin, 2004

== Recognition ==
- After his death, the Research Committee on Environment and Society (RC24) of the International Sociological Association established in his honor the Frederick H. Buttel International Award for Distinguished Scholarship in Environmental Sociology.
- Recognizing his contributions to the field, the Section on Environment and Technology of the American Sociological Association also renamed its Distinguished Contributions Award for him.
- The endowed chair he held at the University of Wisconsin was renamed the Buttel-Sewell Professorship.

== Co-authored books ==
- Rural Sociology of the Advanced Societies (1980)
- Labor and the Environment (1984)
- The Sociology of Agriculture (1990)
- Toward a New Political Economy of Agriculture (1991)
- Hungry for Profit: The Agribusiness Threat to Farmers, Food, and the Environment (2000)
- Environment and Global Modernity (2000)
- Environment, Energy, and Society: A New Synthesis (2001)
- Sociological Theory and Environment (2002)
- New Directions in the Sociology of Global Development, Volume 11 (2005)
- Governing Environmental Flows: Global Challenges to Social Theory (2006)

== See also ==
- List of Cornell University faculty
- List of Michigan State University people
- List of Michigan writers
- List of sociologists
- List of University of Wisconsin–Madison people
- List of Yale University people
