= Norton Fitzwarren =

Village in Somerset, England

Coordinates: 51.0232°N 3.1491°W

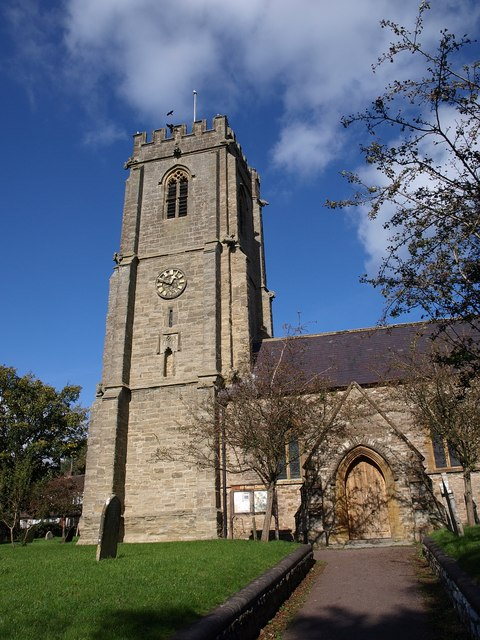
- Church of All Saints, Norton Fitzwarren

- Location within Somerset
- Population: 3,046 (2011)
- OS grid reference: ST195255
- Unitary authority: Somerset Council
- Ceremonial county: Somerset
- Region: South West
- Country: England
- Sovereign state: United Kingdom
- Post town: TAUNTON
- Postcode district: TA2
- Dialling code: 01823
- Police: Avon and Somerset
- Fire: Devon and Somerset
- Ambulance: South Western
- UK Parliament: Taunton and Wellington

Norton Fitzwarren is a village, electoral ward, and civil parish in Somerset, England, situated 2 miles (3.2 km) north west of Taunton. The village has a population of 3,046.

== History ==
The village is on the southern slope of Norton Camp, a large hillfort that shows evidence of occupation from neolithic times, through the Bronze Age, to the Roman occupation of Britain.

The Church of All Saints dates from the late 13th and early 14th century. It has been designated as a Grade II* listed building.

The parish of Norton Fitzwarren was part of the Taunton Deane Hundred.

On 23 November 2021 a double murder occurred in the village, involving a local IT teacher and coffee shop worker.

== Governance ==
The parish council has responsibility for local issues, including setting an annual precept (local rate) to cover the council's operating costs and producing annual accounts for public scrutiny. The parish council evaluates local planning applications and works with the local police, district council officers, and neighbourhood watch groups on matters of crime, security, and traffic. The parish council's role also includes initiating projects for the maintenance and repair of parish facilities, as well as consulting with the district council on the maintenance, repair, and improvement of highways, drainage, footpaths, public transport, and street cleaning. Conservation matters (including trees and listed buildings) and environmental issues are also the responsibility of the council.

For local government purposes, since 1 April 2023, the village comes under the unitary authority of Somerset Council. Prior to this, it was part of the non-metropolitan district of Somerset West and Taunton (formed on 1 April 2019) and, before this, the district of Taunton Deane (established under the Local Government Act 1972). From 1894-1974, for local government purposes, Norton Fitzwarren was part of Taunton Rural District.

It is also part of the Taunton and Wellington county constituency represented in the House of Commons of the Parliament of the United Kingdom. It elects one Member of Parliament (MP) by the first past the post system of election.

== Military connections ==
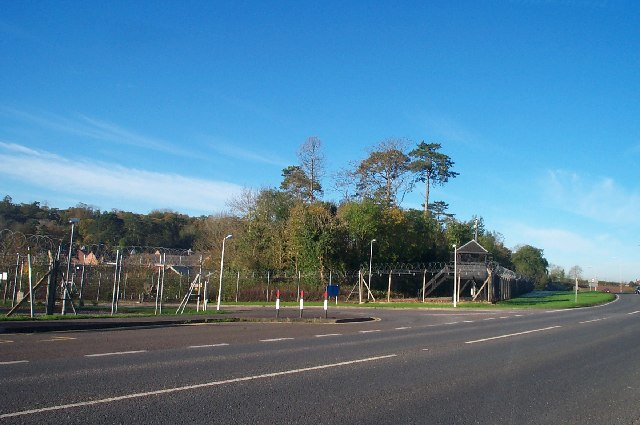
Entrance to Norton Manor Camp, home of 40 Commando, Royal Marines

=== PoW camp ===
It was the location of a 300-man prisoner of war camp during World War II, initially housing Italian prisoners from the Western Desert Campaign, and later German prisoners after the Battle of Normandy. POW Camp Number 665 – 'Cross Keys Camp', Norton Fitzwarren.

=== Royal Marines ===
Just north of the village is Norton Manor Camp, home of 40 Commando, Royal Marines. For many years it was the base of Junior Leaders Battalion, Royal Army Service Corps (until 1965 when RASC was disbanded) which became Junior Leaders Regiment, Royal Corps of Transport. From the early 1960s to the late 1970s, it took boys from age 15 yrs to age 17½ years and trained them to be army transport drivers.

== Industry ==
Norton Fitzwarren is located on the confluence of many fast flowing local water flows, and from the 1700s onwards became the base for many water-powered weaving mills, and after the riots in London, also many silk mills, which gave part of the area its name.

For many years Norton Fitzwarren was the site of the main factory of the Taunton Cider Company producing cider brands such as Blackthorn Cider. Production was moved to Shepton Mallet after Matthew Clark plc, the UK division of Constellation Brands, bought Taunton Cider in 1995.

== Transport ==
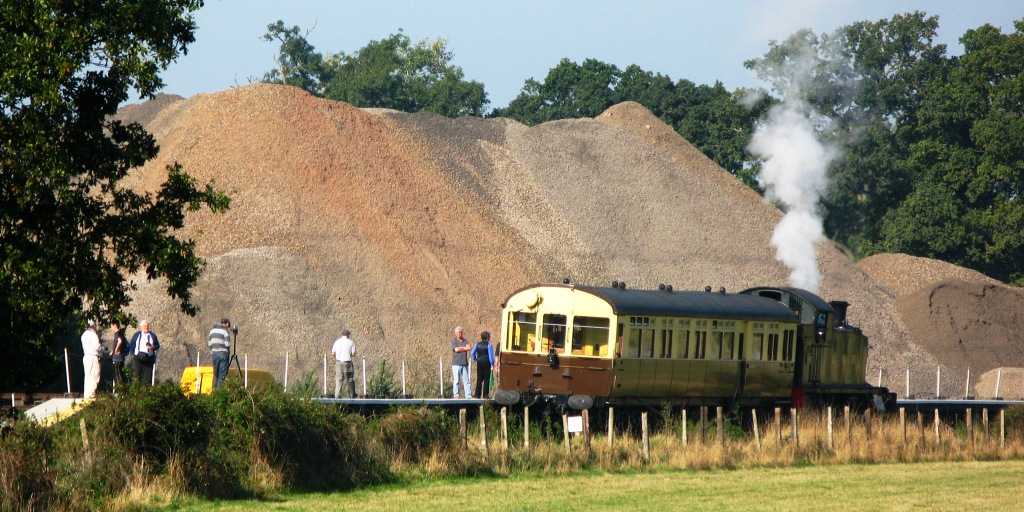
A former-GWR Autocoach is propelled (by GWR 4575 Class 5542) to the new Norton Fitzwarren station on the heritage-West Somerset Railway

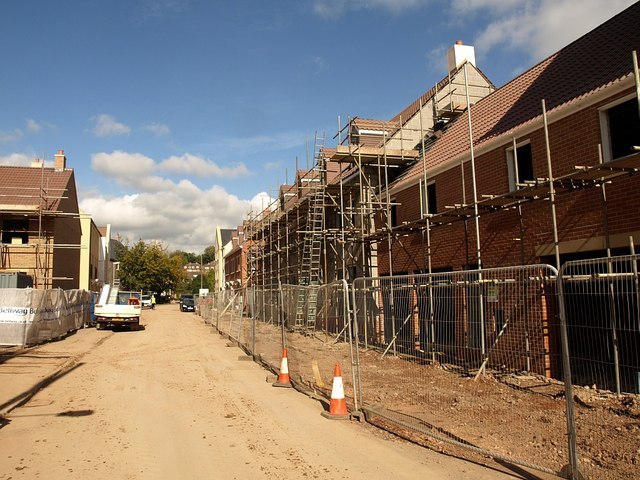
New housing in Station Road, on the site of the former Taunton Cider Company works

Norton Fitzwarren was the site of a boat lift on the now disused section of the Grand Western Canal from 1839 to 1867.

Norton Fitzwarren is on the former Bristol and Exeter Railway mainline, which was operated and then taken over by the GWR in 1890. The station became an important junction station, with branch lines to Minehead and Barnstaple diverging at this point. Resultantly, the station had two island platforms creating four platforms. There were also extensive freight handling facilities, as the station was located west of the Fairwater Yard, a large regional freight yard located south of the mainline. During World War II, the United States Army took over Norton Manor Camp located immediately northwest of the station, and equipped it with extensive railway sidings, all connected to the station. The first major railway accident occurred on 10 November 1890, killing 10 people, and the second on 4 November 1940, which killed 27 people, many of them Royal Navy personnel returning from leave to Plymouth. In 2018 a plaque honouring the victims of both crashes was unveiled in the village.

Norton Fitzwarren station closed in 1966, the same year that the British Army supply depot closed. Taunton Cider took over the former goods yard to the north of the site, but this also closed in the early 1990s, and has been redeveloped as housing. Most of the former Minehead branch is now operated by the West Somerset Railway as a heritage railway.

The village is served by the number 25 & 25A bus services Monday to Saturday, as well as the number 28A bus service Monday to Sunday.

== Notable people ==
- Tristram Welman (1849–1931), cricketer who played 65 first-class matches, including 2 spells for Somerset
- Herbie Hewett (1864–1921), cricketer who played 106 games for Somerset, he possessed a short fuse.
- Cecil Buttle (1906–1988), for more than 50 years he was variously a player, for Somerset County Cricket Club, a net bowler, a substitute fielder, a reserve umpire and after WWII, the groundsman at the County Ground, Taunton.
- Tim Willcox (born 1963), journalist, grew up locally, formerly worked as a presenter for BBC News;

== See also ==
- Norton Camp Bronze Age hillfort
- Norton Fitzwarren rail crash (1940)
- Norton Fitzwarren rail crash (1890)
