= John Ridge (British Army officer) =

Senior British Army officer

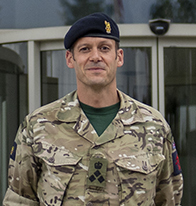
- Brigadier Ridge in 2019
- Military career
- Allegiance: United Kingdom
- Branch: British Army
- Service years: 1995–2020
- Rank: Brigadier
- Commands: 26 Engineer Regiment; 8 Engineer Brigade
- Conflicts: War in Afghanistan
- Awards: Commander of the Order of the British Empire

Brigadier John Henry Ridge CBE (born 4 September 1971) is a British civil servant and former senior British Army officer.

== Education ==
He was educated at the University of Leeds (MEng architectural engineering, 1995), Cranfield University (MSc defence management, 2004), and King's College London (MA defence studies, 2005).

== Military career ==
Ridge was commissioned into the Royal Engineers in 1995. He served as commanding officer of 26 Engineer Regiment in which role he was deployed to Afghanistan. He went on to become commander of 8 Engineer Brigade in October 2015 and in that role led the British response to Hurricane Irma, an extremely powerful Cape Verde hurricane that caused widespread destruction across its path, in September 2017. He went on to become Chief, Joint Force Operations at Permanent Joint Headquarters in Northwood in September 2017. He was appointed a Commander of the Order of the British Empire (CBE) in the 2018 New Year Honours.

He was to be promoted to major general and appointed General Officer Commanding of Army Recruiting and Initial Training Command in April 2020. However, he retired from the British Army on 25 April 2020, and joined the Civil Service. As of July 2022, he is Director of Defence Innovation at the Ministry of Defence.
