= Robert Houghton =

British World War II marines officer

Major-General Robert Houghton CB OBE MC DL
- Born: 7 March 1912; Dawlish, Devon
- Died: 17 January 2011 (aged 98); Whitesmith, Lewes, East Sussex
- Military career
- Allegiance: United Kingdom
- Branch: Royal Marines
- Service years: 1930–1964
- Rank: Major-General
- Nickname: Titch
- Commands: 3 Commando Brigade; 40 Commando; 42 Commando; 45 Commando
- Conflicts: Second World War; 1947–48 Civil War in Mandatory Palestine
- Awards: Companion of the Order of the Bath; Officer of the Order of the British Empire; Military Cross

Major-General Robert Dyer Houghton, CB, OBE, MC, DL (7 March 1912 – 17 January 2011), commonly known as "Titch", was a Royal Marines officer of the Second World War and post-war period.

== Early life ==
Houghton was born in Dawlish, Devon, the son of John Mayo Houghton and Lucy Evelyn Trotman. He was educated at Haileybury and Imperial Service College, before entering the Royal Marines in 1930.

== Military career ==
Houghton received his commission on 1 September 1930. He served on HMS Malaya, before becoming the commander of an anti-aircraft battery of the Mobile Naval Base Defence Organisation in Egypt and Crete in 1935. At the start of the Second World War, Houghton was serving as Adjutant of the 1st Battalion, 101 Royal Marines Brigade. He held the role until February 1942, when he became Adjutant of the 15th (S) Battalion, 101 Royal Marines Brigade.

In January 1942, Houghton became second-in-command of 40 Commando, and participated in the Allies' failed raid on Dieppe on 19 August 1942. Like the majority of his unit, he was captured by the Germans in the fiasco. As a prisoner of war, Houghton was shackled for 411 days, and remained in captivity for the rest of the war. He was subsequently awarded the Military Cross for his bravery at Dieppe and for his endurance as a prisoner of war.

After his release at the end of the war, Houghton became Commanding Officer of 45 Commando and attended the Staff College, Camberley. He then served as the Commanding Officer of 40 Commando during the 1947–48 Civil War in Mandatory Palestine. Houghton was tasked with keeping the port of Haifa open during the conflict, so that British forces could withdraw from Palestine. His unit was the last to leave. For his services, he was made Officer of the Order of the British Empire in the 1949 Birthday Honours. He was subsequently appointed to the Joint Services Staff College, before working as staff officer (Intelligence) to the Commander in Chief South Atlantic and commandant of the Commando School. Between October 1954 and April 1955 he was Commanding Officer of 42 Commando, before serving as director of the Royal Marines Reserve.

In August 1957, Houghton was appointed Commander 3rd Commando Brigade, which was based in Malta. In 1959 he was appointed commanding officer of the Royal Marines in Deal and commandant of the Royal Marines School of Music. Promoted to major general on 4 September 1961, his last two appointments were as Director Joint Warfare Staff at the Ministry of Defence and Major-General Royal Marines in Portsmouth. He was appointed Companion of the Order of the Bath and retired in 1964.

== Retirement ==
Houghton fulfilled the ceremonial role of Colonel Commandant, Royal Marines between January 1973 and December 1976. He was General Secretary, Royal UK Beneficent Association from 1968 to 1978, and was Deputy Lieutenant of East Sussex in 1977.
