= 40 Commando =

Battalion sized formation of the Royal Marines

Coordinates: 51°2.338′N 3°9.248′W

40 Commando Royal Marines
- Unit badge
- Active: 1942–present
- Country: United Kingdom
- Branch: Royal Marines; Naval Service
- Type: Commando
- Size: One battalion
- Part of: UK Commando Force
- Garrison/HQ: Norton Manor Camp, Taunton, Somerset
- Mottos: Per Mare Per Terram; By Sea By Land (Latin)
- March: Quick: "A Life on the Ocean Wave"; Slow: "Preobrajensky"

Commanders
- Current commander: Lt Col Oliver Denning RM
- Captain-General, Royal Marines: King Charles III
- Regimental Sergeant Major: WO1 L Drinkwater RM

40 Commando RM is a battalion-sized formation of the British Royal Marines and subordinate unit within UK Commando Force, the principal Commando formation, under the operational command of the Fleet Commander. Their barracks are at Norton Manor Camp, Norton Fitzwarren near Taunton in Somerset.

Tasked as a Commando light infantry unit, 40 Commando (pronounced "Forty Commando") is capable of a wide range of operational tasks. Personnel regularly deploy outside the United Kingdom on operations or training. Whilst 3 Commando Brigade RM are the principal cold weather warfare formation, personnel are capable of operating in a variety of theatres including tropical jungle, desert or mountainous terrain. The Commando is a regular participant in the annual Brigade cold weather warfare exercise in Norway. The unit's first "winter" was 1991, until which the unit was nicknamed the "Sunshine Commando".

All personnel will have completed the Commando course at the Commando Training Centre (CTCRM) at Lympstone in Devon, entitling them to wear the green beret, with attached personnel having completed the All Arms Commando Course.

== History ==
=== Formation ===
Early Commando units were volunteer mainly from the British Army but in In late 1941 it was decided that the Royal Marines should raise their own units, a signal was sent to all Royal Marines units and throughout the Fleet, "For the attention of all Royal Marine trained personnel – volunteers required for special duties of a hazardous nature". Over 6,000 men volunteered. All volunteers faced a tough selection process to ensure the best candidates started the Commando course. After a robust selection process the initial volunteers assembled at North Infantry Barracks at the Royal Marine Depot, Deal in Kent from across the Corps on 14 February 1942. Forming the first all-volunteer Royal Marines Commando unit. Designated 'The Royal Marine Commando.’ to differentiate it from Army Commandos. Col J Picton Phillips was the Commanding Officer.

=== Dieppe Raid ===
The RM Commando's first assignment was Operation Jubilee at Dieppe on 19 August 1942. In support of the main Canadian assault force, Nos. 3 and 4 (Army) Commandos were to destroy the enemy coastal batteries covering the main landing beaches, whilst the RM Commando's role was to take the Port Area to capture German naval craft and intelligence while destroying port installations. There were also to act as a reverse as required. In the pre-dawn run-in the landing craft of No. 3 were fired upon and scattered with the result that only two small parties managed to land, one was overwhelmed, but the other successfully engaged the Berneval battery for some hours before withdrawing. On the other flank at Varengeville No. 4, under the command of Lord Lovat, carried out what was officially hailed as a 'classic operation of war' and completely destroyed the Hess Battery, successfully withdrawing and re-embarking with prisoners.

Unfortunately, following confused reports from the main beaches the Force Commander, Major General John Hamilton Roberts ordered the reserve units in. The Fusiliers Mont-Royal and the RM Commando reinforced the Canadian assault force, who were pinned down on the main beach. With the RM Commando now committed to support the main landings, the Commanding Officer realised his men were about to join the failing assault. He stood on the rear deck of his landing craft and signalled the withdrawal. He was killed during his actions. The few men and craft that had already arrived at the beach were stranded when their assault craft were damaged. They continued to fight for three hours until they were killed, wounded or captured. This included the unit second-in-command Robert Houghton.

After the raid approval was given to raise a second commando unit from the Royal Marines. On 10 October 1942, the 2nd Royal Marines Commando was formed. The Units were initially renamed: ‘A’ (RM) Commando and ‘B’ (RM) Commando. By the end of November 1942 the Units were soon renamed as: No.40 (Royal Marines) Commando, with B (RM) Commando becoming No.41 (Royal Marines) Commando.

=== Italy and the Aegean ===
After the raid, approval was given to raise a second commando unit from the Royal Marines. On 10 October 1942, the 2nd Royal Marines Commando was formed. The Units were initially renamed: ‘A’ (RM) Commando and ‘B’ (RM) Commando. By the end of November 1942 the Units were soon renamed as: No.40 (Royal Marines) Commando, with B (RM) Commando becoming No.41 (Royal Marines) Commando. there were a number of organisational changes reflecting lessons learned from Dieppe, included reorganisation from Companies to Troop formations and the commando's were now issued with their Green Berets which had been chosen as part of the Commando uniform.

On 10 July 1943, No.40 RM Commando took part in Operation HUSKY (Landing at Sicily) the unit landed on the southern tip of Sicily near Pachino. Little opposition was met by the unit from the islands defenders. On the 16 July elements of the unit were embarked on HMS Queen Emma, the following day the ship suffered an air attack. A near miss sent shrapnel into a box of grenades stored in the barracks. The resulting explosion killed 15 ranks and wounding 58 others, many of whom were members of 40 RM Commando.

On 7 September 1943, they took part in Operation FERDY (Landings at Vibo Valentia) on the Italian mainland near the southwestern town of Pizzo. They encountered more resistance from German forces, with mortar, armour and infantry counterattacks.

In the early hours of 3 October 1943 Operation Devon (Landing at Termoli) began. The units landed by sea and quickly cleared the town before the enemy were alerted. The enemy awoke to the British on their doorstep. A short and fierce close-quarter battle ensued with the German Paratroops stationed in the town. By 0800 the town was captured, and the landing force was in control of the approaches. So complete was the surprise that German vehicles and motorcycles were still driving into the commando ambush until noon that day.

The Germans retaliated with force. The German 16th Panzer Division, were ordered by Field Marshal Albert Kesselring to retake the town. For the next few days the men of the original landing force and some reinforcements from the 78th Division held off repeated assaults from infantry and armour. The 8th Army linked up with the force on 6 October. The German forces finally withdraw on 7 October, pulling back to their next prepared defensive line on the Trigno. The action had secured a valuable harbour for the allied advance and dislodges the Germans across the natural defence of the Biferno.

In early January 1944, the Commando were engaged in operations on the Garigliano front on the west coast part of the German Gustav line. During their patrol operations small parties from the unit infiltrated through enemy lines and conducted harassing raids and disrupting lines of communication. During this period two Military Cross’s (one was a bar) and three military medals were awarded. On 17 January the unit participated in the full-scale crossing of the river and remained in the area till the end of January.

The unit found itself at Anzio by the end of February 1944, conducting patrols and small actions to help expand the beachhead. They remained on the Anzio front line for the month before the 2nd Special Service Brigade was re-tasked to the Adriatic. Over the next year the unit was engaged in raids and operations tying down vital German forces in the areas from reinforcing Italy. The unit initially based itself from the island of Vis and supported Yugoslav Partisans actions of the Dalmatian coast. One operation was the Raid on Brač (Operation FLOUNCED 1 to 3 June 1944) to reduce pressure on the Partisan commander Josip Broz Tito.

The raid attacked the two German reinforced Battalions garrisoned on the island along with No.2 & No.43 Commando and supported by 1,700 partisans. The unit attacked through a heavy defended area to reach its objective. The German force launched a strong counterattack in which the Commando withdraw to the start line to re-join with No.43 Commando. During the raid the Commanding Officer (Lt Col ‘Pops’ Manners) and the Force Commander (Lt Col ‘Mad Jack’ Churchill - CO of No.2 Commando) led the attacks from the front with Mad Jack playing bagpipes. Lt Col Manners was killed during the German counterattack and Mad Jack was later captured during the raid.

On 24 September 1944, both No.2 and 40 (RM) Commando landed at Sugar Beach north of Sarande in Albania (Operation Mercerised), with the unit's objective being to capture Sarande and cut off German forces evacuating from Corfu. The initial intelligence numbered the German force as 200 soldiers. It was later corrected as a zero had been dropped: 2,000 Germans defended the port. The approach was covered by 20 German artillery positions. After the initial landing, units were reinforced with 25-pounder guns from the 111th (Bolton) Field Regiment, Royal Artillery. The town fell after a bitter fight through difficult rocky terrain and worsening weather on the 9 October 1944. The force took 1,000 German prisoners including troop trying to evacuate from Corfu, one being the former garrison commander of Corfu.

After a brief pause white flags were seen on Corfu and 40 RM Commando landed on the island on 12 October to accept the surrender of the remaining Germans and liberate the island. The unit remained on the Corfu until February 1945 to restore law and order and safeguard the peace until the Greek authorities could once again take control.

In November 1944 the Brigade Name changed from No.2 Special Service brigade to 2 Commando Brigade. 40 RM Commando took part in one of the 8th Army's last major offensive actions of the Second World War on 1 April 1945 in Operation Roast (the assault on Commacchio). The unit conducted a feint attack to the south, crossing the river Reno and clearing its north bank.

The subsequent action in the area, Operation IMPACT-PLAIN (Battle of the Argenta Gap) was one of the costliest actions for the unit of the war. Tasked to secure the pumping/power station at the western side of lake Commacchio and widening the bridgehead to open the Argenta Gap south of the Lake, it cost 27 dead and 45 wounded when they were pinned down by German 88mm, 75 mm Tank destroyer (Semovente da 75/34) and 81 mm mortar's. The unit advanced under heavy fire and was successful in taking their objectives with follow up forces being able to roll up the enemy position and push the line 4 miles north. This was last direct action for the unit in the Second World War. The unit continued to operate on the Italian front line and rotating to guard German POW camps until the surrender of the German army in Italy on 2 May 1945.

At the end of June 1945 the 40 RM Commando returned to England. Both 40 and 43 started sending ranks to other RM Commando units still serving in the far east or to a holdover company, ready for the final disbandment of the units. On the 12 September 1945 No.40 RM and No.43 RM Commando were officially amalgamated at Tichbourne house, Alresford. They were renamed, The Royal Marines Commando (2 Commando Brigade). In early October 1945 the unit was demobilized.

=== Post-Second World War ===
In the Spring of 1946, No.45 RM Commando arrived in the Far East to strengthen the only remaining Commando Brigade, 3 Commando Brigade. As the country started to reorganise the military after the Second World War, the decision was made to disband most of the Army Commandos. The Commando role would mainly be taken by Royal Marines with specialist elements from the Army. In October 1946, after the disbandment of No.1 and No.5 Commando units (they had amalgamated as No.1/5 Commando), the Brigade was re-designated as 3 Commando Brigade Royal Marines.

In a move to represent Commando operations from each theatre during the Second World War, the decision was taken to rename No.44(RM) Commando. On 16 March 1947, 40 Commando Royal Marines was re-formed in Hong-Kong now as part of 3 Commando Brigade; this was to recognise the contributions at Dieppe and the Mediterranean theatre. The other units were restyled 42 Commando Royal Marines representing Far-east operations and 45 Commando Royal Marines representing Operations in Northern Europe.

The Commando was involved in 1947–1948 Civil War in Palestine acting as the rearguard in the Protectorate, leaving in 1948. It also fought in the Malayan Emergency against the communist Malayan National Liberation Army.

=== Malayan Emergency - headhunting photographs ===
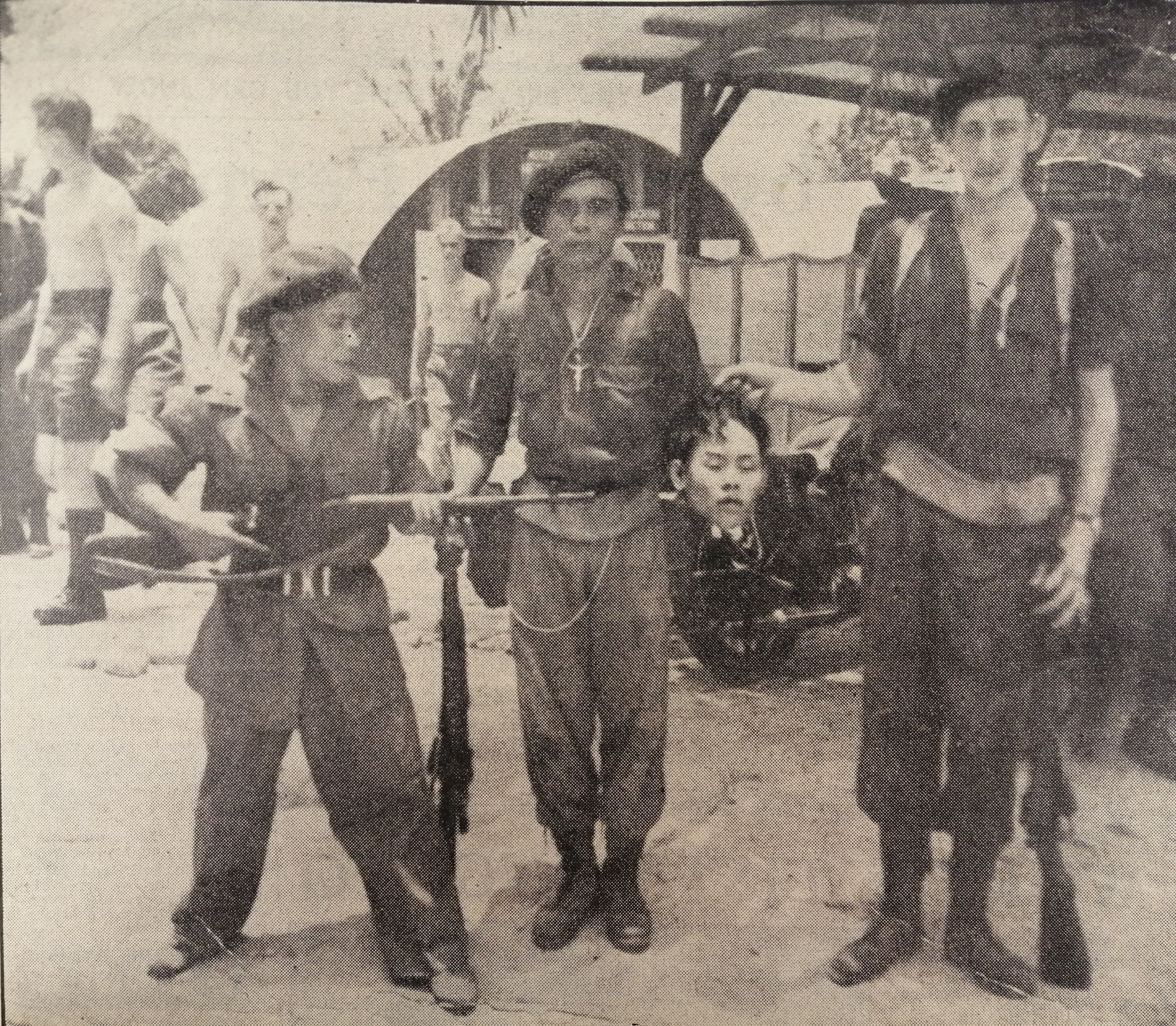
Soldiers in a 40 Commando base pose with the severed head of an MNLA guerrilla, 1951.

Marines of the 40 Commandos caused a media scandal when photographs were leaked to the public showing their marines posing with the severed heads of pro-independence guerrillas during the Malayan Emergency. This was a common practice employed by the British during the war and was often conducted by Iban headhunters from Borneo hired by the British military.

In April 1952, British left-wing newspaper The Daily Worker (today known as the Morning Star) published a photograph depicting soldiers inside a 40 Commando base near Kuala Kangsar holding the severed head of a suspected pro-independence fighter belonging to the Malayan National Liberation Army (MNLA). An Admiralty spokesman subsequently claimed that the photographs were a forgery and a "communist trick", though Colonial Secretary Oliver Lyttelton later confirmed to Parliament that they were genuine. Lyttelton came to the defence of the Commando, noting that the decapitations had been conducted by an Iban headhunter from Borneo hired by the British army, and not the Marines themselves.

=== 1960s ===
The Commando subsequently undertook security duties in Cyprus, Hong Kong and Egypt before moving to Singapore in 1961. It was involved in operations during the confrontation with Indonesia (Borneo) throughout the following decade.

=== Return to UK ===
In 1971 the Commando left Singapore and re-established itself in Seaton Barracks, Crownhill, Plymouth. Over the next decade the Commando found itself deployed to Northern Ireland four times and also undertook an unexpected two-month tour in Cyprus after the 1974 invasion by the Turkish Army.

=== Falklands Conflict ===
In 1982, following the Argentine invasion of the Falkland Islands, the Commando deployed on Operation Corporate. On 21 May the Commando were among the first troops ashore and secured the beachhead at San Carlos. The Unit was subsequently split having two companies attached to the Welsh Guards, preparing to attack Port Stanley, when the Argentine surrender came.

=== 1980s ===
On their return from the Falklands, the Commando spent the rest of the decade involved in a variety of tasks including two Northern Ireland tours to South Armagh, a six-month Peace-Keeping tour in Cyprus and a six-month operational tour in Belize. During the tour in Cyprus, the Commando was awarded the Wilkinson Sword of Peace for the third time. Also during this period, in 1983, the Commando relocated to Norton Manor Camp near Taunton.

=== 1990s ===
In 1991 the Unit undertook its first Norway deployment but found itself undergoing a dramatic climatic change when, due to the Gulf War, it deployed to Northern Iraq to ensure the security of Kurdish refugees. Northern Ireland tours, Norway winter deployments and a major Asia-Pacific Exercise kept the Commando busy through the following years. In November 1993 the unit deployed to West Belfast in support of the Royal Ulster Constabulary (RUC), returning in May 1994. In 1998 a substantial part of the Commando deployed to the Congo to ensure the safe evacuation of UK nationals from Kinshasa City.

=== Recent history ===
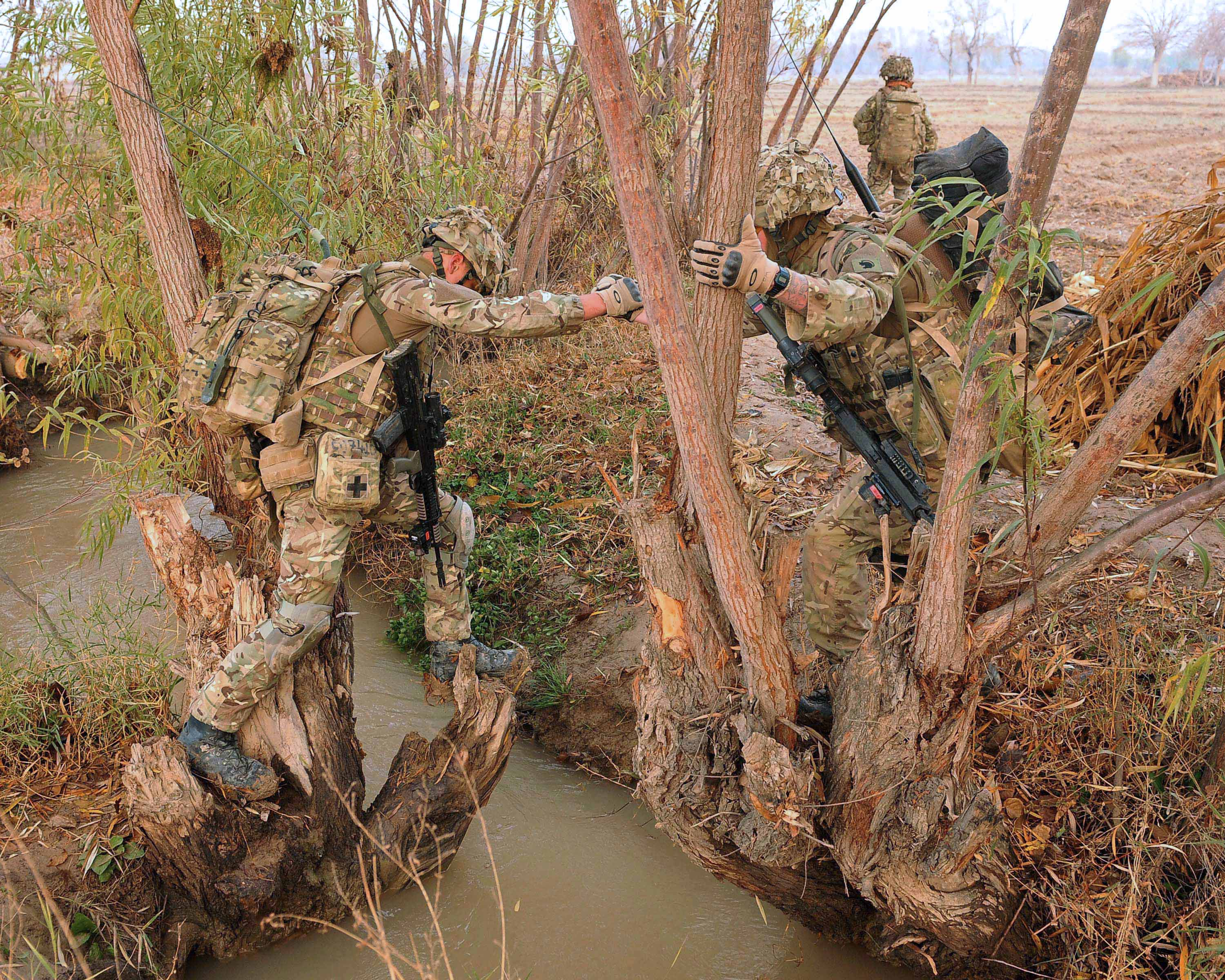
Royal Marines from 40 Commando cross an irrigation ditch in Helmand Province, Afghanistan.

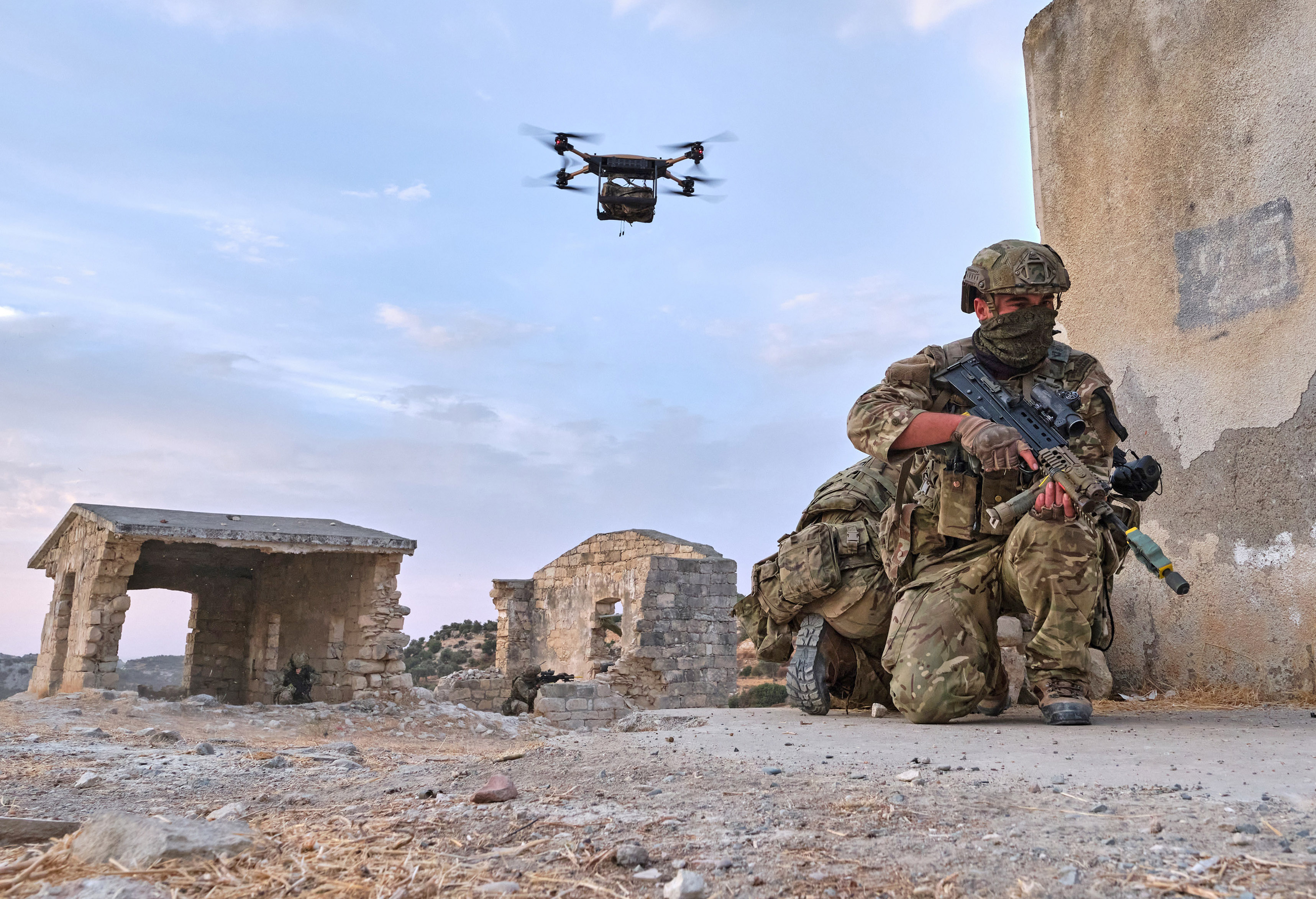
40 Commando Royal Marines on exercise with a heavy lift UAV in 2020.

The new millennium saw the Commando deploy to Northern Ireland and on their return they were the first Commando to reorganise under a new structural concept called Commando 21.

The Unit deployed in its entirety in January 2003, initially part of the Naval Task Group (NTG) 03 in HMS Ocean, HMS Ark Royal and Royal Fleet Auxiliary ships RFA Sir Galahad and RFA Sir Tristram. The group sailed through the Mediterranean Sea, after a brief stop at Cyprus, continuing through the Suez Canal bound for the Persian Gulf. The United Nations were engaged in diplomatic efforts to avoid the need for military intervention in Iraq, as the Unit was busy rehearsing in the United Arab Emirates and Kuwait for possible operations against Iraq.

In March 2003 a coalition force, under the overall command of the United States, entered Iraq. During Operation TELIC 1, the liberation of Iraq, on the night of 20 March 2003, 40 Commando RM, under the command of Lt Col G K Messenger DSO OBE, mounted an amphibious helicopter assault to seize key Iraqi oil infrastructure on the Al-Faw Peninsula. As the first conventional troops on the ground, the strategic significance of the operation was immense and, as the Divisional Main Effort, the assault was supported by a vast array of coalition firepower. The Commando Group's role in the success of the coalition operation in Iraq was pivotal and profound. In a two-week period of intense operations, it secured key oil infrastructure, cleared a large expanse of enemy held terrain, and defeated a major enemy stronghold on the periphery of Basra, killing over 150 Iraqi soldiers and taking 440 prisoners.

In 2004 the Unit returned to Iraq as part of a multi-national division peace-support operation. The commandos returned in April 2008 from a tour in the Helmand Province of Afghanistan as part of Operation Herrick. During the tour L-Cpl Matthew Croucher was awarded the George Cross for his action of jumping on a live grenade during a patrol.

40 Cdo returned to Afghanistan in 2010 for Op Herrick 12. They were the last British troops to leave Sangin, described as the "deadliest place in Afghanistan", after command was handed over to the US Armed Forces.

A Company deployed with the UK Response Force Task Group in April 2011. Additional follow up forces were on board RFA Cardigan Bay. They then completed Exercise Red Alligator in October 2013: this trained their skills for the role of the Lead Commando Group.

In the autumn of 2017, the Unit spearheaded the UK Military's crisis response (Operation RUMAN) in the Caribbean following the catastrophic damage caused to UK Overseas Territories by record-breaking Atlantic Hurricanes. 40 Commando deployed hundreds of troops to the British Virgin Islands, the Turks and Caicos Islands and Anguilla. Their efforts helped to reassure the affected communities, restore security, fix critical infrastructure and distribute humanitarian aid. The Unit's humanitarian efforts were subsequently recognised by the award of the Firmin Sword of Peace; a record 4th time for the Unit.

40 Commando are CBRN defense experts, expecting to be the lead unit in the event of a CBRN incident. In 2018 they participated in the annual chemical warfare exercise, Exercise TOXIC DAGGER, on Salisbury Plain involving over 300 military personnel, along with the RAF Regiment, the Royal Marines Band Service for casualty treatment and utilising Defence CBRN Centre expertise.

It became clear in 2018 that 40 Commando would, as would 45 Commando, form the infantry component of a Littoral Response Group, as part of restructuring in the Future Commando Force programme.

== Unit memorable dates ==
- The Landing at Termoli — 3 October 1943
- The Landing at San Carlos — 21 May 1982
- The Clearance of the Al-Faw Peninsula — 20 March 2003

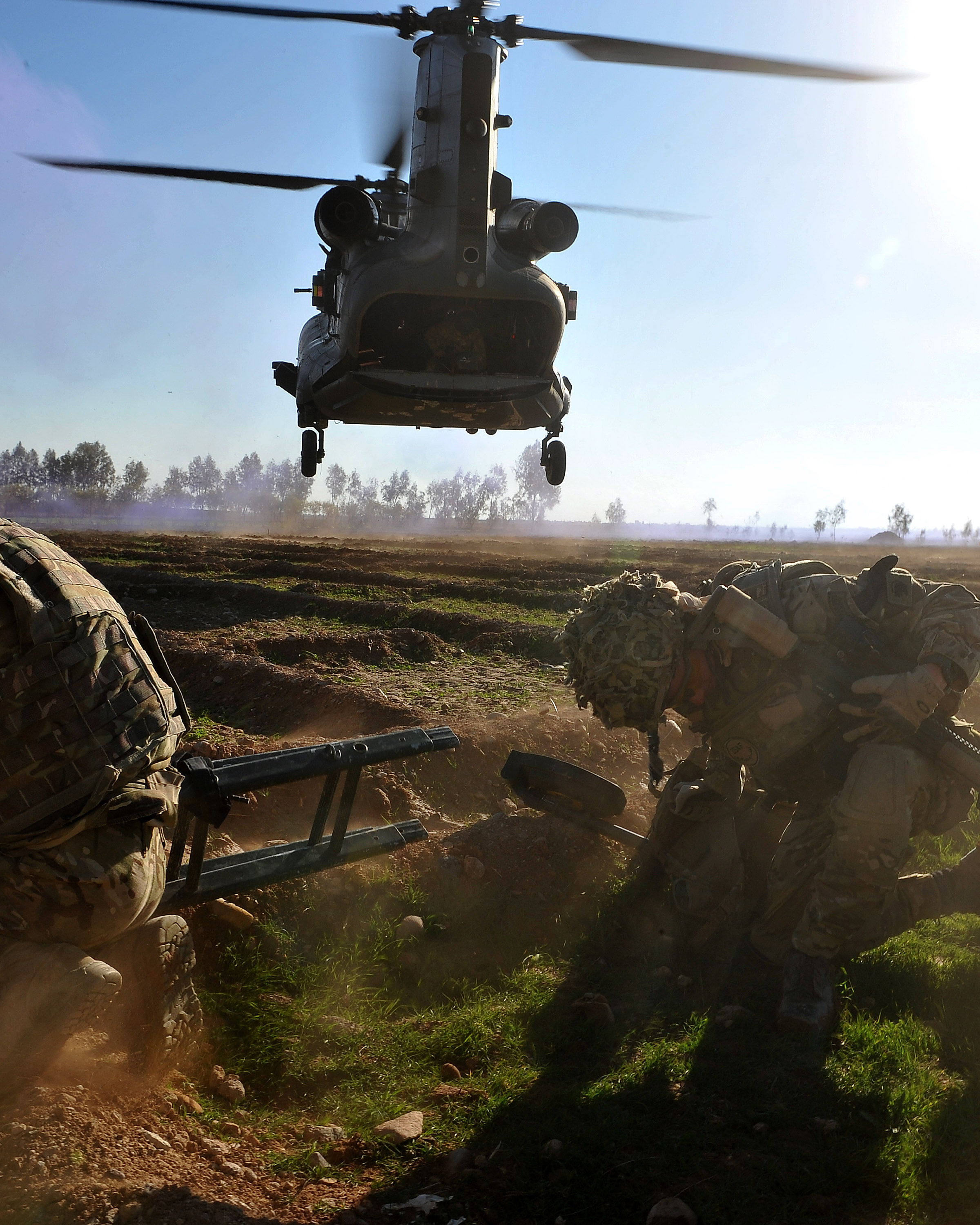
A Chinook flies in low over the heads of Royal Marines from Alpha Company, 40 Commando Royal Marines during Op DAAS 7B, Nahr-e-Saraj district, Afghanistan.

== Battle honours ==
The following Battle honours were awarded to the British Commandos during the Second World War.

- Adriatic
- Alethangyaw
- Aller
- Anzio
- Argenta Gap
- Burma 1943–45
- Crete
- Dieppe
- Dives Crossing
- Djebel Choucha
- Flushing
- Greece 1944–45
- Italy 1943–45
- Kangaw
- Landing at Porto San Venere
- Landing in Sicily
- Leese
- Litani
- Madagascar
- Middle East 1941, 1942, 1944
- Monte Ornito
- Myebon
- Normandy Landing
- North Africa 1941–43
- North-West Europe 1942, 1944–1945
- Norway 1941
- Pursuit to Messina
- Rhine
- St. Nazaire
- Salerno
- Sedjenane 1
- Sicily 1943
- Steamroller Farm
- Syria 1941
- Termoli
- Vaagso
- Valli di Comacchio
- Westkapelle

== Commanding officers ==
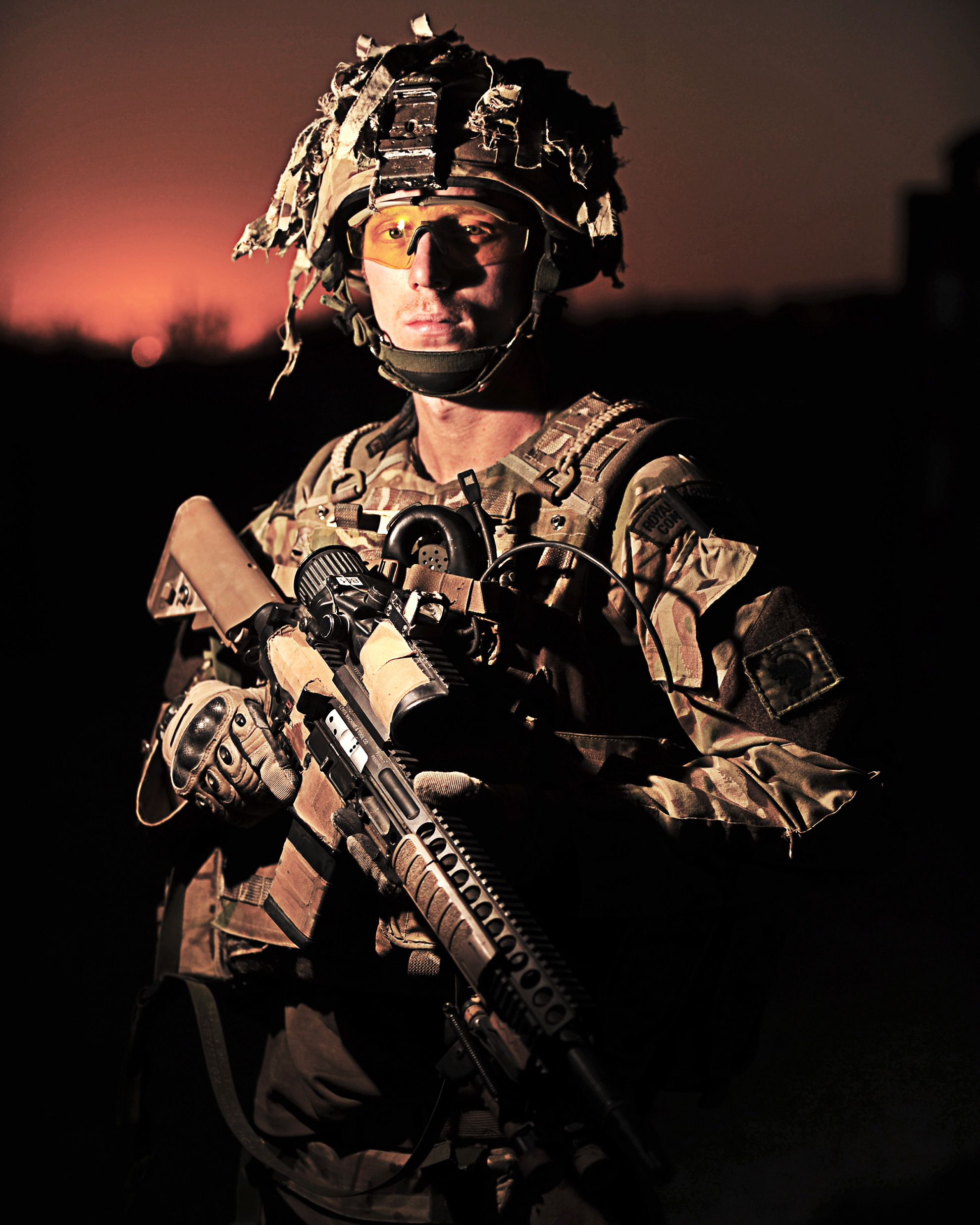
Portrait of a Royal Marine of Bravo Company 40 Commando Royal Marines.

Commanders have included:

- 1942–1942 Lt Col J Picton Phillips RM (KIA Dieppe)
- 1942–1944 Lt Col J C "Pops" Manners RM (KIA Brač, Yugoslavia)
- 1944–1944 Major N S E Maude RM
- 1944–1945 Lt Col R W Sankey DSO DSC RM
- 1945–1945 Maj I D De'Ath DSO MBE RM
- 1945–1945 Lt Col C L Price RM
- 1947–1949 Lt Col R D Houghton OBE MC RM
- 1949–1951 Lt Col B J D Lumsden RM
- 1951–1953 Lt Col M Price DSO OBE RM
- 1953–1954 Lt Col H E Johns MBE RM
- 1954–1956 Lt Col T M Gray DSO MC RM
- 1956–1958 Lt Col D G Tweed DSO MBE RM
- 1958–1959 Lt Col Peter Hellings DSO MC RM
- 1959–1961 Lt Col I S Harrison RM
- 1961–1963 Lt Col David Hunter MC RM
- 1963–1964 Lt Col J F Parsons MC RM
- 1964–1966 Lt Col J A Taplin MBE RM
- 1966–1967 Lt Col E D Pounds RM
- 1967–1969 Lt Col Robert Loudoun RM
- 1969–1970 Lt Col David Alexander RM
- 1970-1972 Lt Col D L Bailey OBE RM
- 1972–1974 Lt Col John Mottram RM
- 1975–1978 Lt Col Julian Thompson RM
- 1978–1979 Lt Col Martin Garrod RM
- 1979–1981 Lt Col Robin Ross RM
- 1981–1983 Lt Col Malcolm Hunt RM
- 1983–1985 Lt Col Tim Donkin RM
- 1985-1987 Lt Col Alan Hooper RM
- 1987–1989 Lt Col John Chester RM
- 1989–1991 Lt Col A D Wray RM
- 1991–1992 Lt Col Graham Dunlop RM
- 1992–1994 Lt Col Anthony Milton RM
- 1994–1996 Lt Col Ian Gardiner RM
- 1996–1998 Lt Col Jim Dutton RM
- 1998–2000 Lt Col John Kiff OBE RM
- 2000–2002 Lt Col David Capewell RM
- 2002–2003 Lt Col Gordon Messenger DSO OBE ADC
- 2003–2004 Lt Col Richard Watts OBE RM
- 2004–2006 Lt Col D C M King RM
- 2006–2008 Lt Col S M Birrell DSO RM
- 2008–2010 Lt Col Paul James DSO RM
- 2010–2013 Lt Col Matt Jackson DSO RM
- 2013–2015 Lt Col Alex Janzen OBE RM
- 2015–2017 Lt Col Andy Watkins RM
- 2017–2019 Lt Col Paul Maynard OBE RM
- 2019–2021 Lt Col Simon Rogers RM
- 2021–2023 Lt Col Andy Dow RM
- 2023–2025 Lt Col Oliver Denning RM
- 2025–Present Lt Col James Buckley RM
