= Goldschmidt Thesis =

In the sociology of agriculture, the Goldschmidt Thesis is the thesis by Walter Goldschmidt that farm scale and other management characteristics (e.g., wage labor) are associated with certain community characteristics. Goldschmidt was a California anthropologist who conducted pioneering rural community research under USDA's Bureau of Agricultural Economics on three California farming communities (Wasco, Arvin, and Dinuba). His 1944 research showed that largescale, especially industrial, farm structures in one community were associated with adverse community conditions. Smaller-scale, owner-operated farms in the other community, were associated with more vibrant, diverse economies and with higher standards of living.

A large body of research has accumulated testing the Goldschmidt Thesis. However, the validity of the thesis that farm structural characteristics dominating an area can produce certain rural community characteristics remains ambiguous. Research results supporting the thesis and other conclusions casting doubt on it have characterized the debate for over 50 years.
