= Cecil Buttle =

English cricketer and umpire

Cec Buttle
Personal information
- Full name: Cecil Frederick Douglas Buttle
- Born: 11 January 1906; Norton Fitzwarren, Taunton, Somerset, England
- Died: 15 December 1988 (aged 82); Taunton, Somerset, England
- Batting: Right-handed
- Bowling: Right-arm fast-medium
- Role: Bowler

Domestic team information
- Years: Team
- 1926–1928: Somerset
- FC debut: 22 May 1926 Somerset v Gloucestershire
- Last FC: 20 June 1928 Somerset v Nottinghamshire

Career statistics
Competition	First-class
Matches	2
Runs scored	8
Batting average	2.66
100s/50s	0/0
Top score	4*
Balls bowled	72
Wickets	0
Bowling average	–
5 wickets in innings	–
10 wickets in match	–
Best bowling	–
Catches/stumpings	0/–
- Source: CricketArchive, 1 January 2010

Cecil Frederick Douglas Buttle (11 January 1906 – 15 December 1988) was associated with Somerset County Cricket Club for more than 50 years as a player, a net bowler, a substitute fielder, a reserve umpire and, for about 30 years after the Second World War, the groundsman at the County Ground, Taunton. He was born at Norton Fitzwarren in Taunton in 1906.

== Cricket player ==
As a player, Buttle was a right-arm fast-medium bowler, but though he was on Somerset's ground staff for many years, he played only two first-class matches, one each in the 1926 and 1928 seasons, and failed to take a wicket in either of them.

Buttle was interviewed by writer David Foot for his 1980s history of Somerset cricket. Foot writes that Buttle was "a very good club bowler, fast by those standards and able to move the ball away." Buttle himself is quoted as saying: "Harry (Harry Fernie, the groundsman) was always short staffed and but for that I think I'd have got a few games on some of the northern tours. I was frequently fielding for one side or the other at Taunton, but it wasn't the same."

== Groundsman and umpire ==
As head groundsman at Taunton from 1946, Buttle was also called on when there were problems with other cricket pitches in Somerset: in 1953, he was forced into emergency action after the newly-relaid pitch at the Recreation Ground, Bath produced a farcical one-day result on the first day of what was meant to be a three-match festival of three-day games – the match, against Lancashire, was Bertie Buse's benefit match and was finished before six o'clock on the opening day. Buttle told Foot: "I had to take drastic action, and I decided on plenty of liquid marl and cow manure. We used a watering can to spread it across the wicket. The problem was knowing how to camouflage what we'd done. Then I hit on the use of cut grass. I sprinkled it all over the top and gave it a good roll." The other matches in the Bath cricket festival were saved.

In addition to his groundsmanship duties, Buttle was also called on to umpire in less important first-class matches in Somerset, such as those against university sides or early-season friendly matches. He also stood as umpire in several second eleven matches. He died at Taunton in 1988.
