= Buttle UK =

British children's charity

- Founded: 1953
- Founder: Frank Buttle
- Registration no.: 313007 (England & Wales), SC037997 (Scotland)
- Location: London, United Kingdom
- Region served: England, Wales, Scotland, Northern Ireland
- Product: Grant Giving, Research
- Key people: Joseph Howes (Chief Executive)
- Revenue: £4.3 million
- Employees: 21
- Website: buttleuk.org
- Formerly called: The Frank Buttle Trust
- 2016 Annual Report

Buttle UK, formerly known as The Frank Buttle Trust, is a UK charity that provides financial grants to children in need. Founded by Frank Buttle in 1937 but not operational until after his death in 1953, the charity has helped many thousands of people throughout the United Kingdom. In 2015–2016, it made 10,068 grants totalling just over £3.9 million.

The people the charity helps are often in particularly difficult circumstances and may be experiencing significant deprivation. They may be estranged from their family, seriously ill, or experiencing a range of other social problems.

== Areas of support ==
Buttle UK is a charity dedicated to helping children and young people in the UK who have experienced crisis, live in financial hardship and deal with multiple challenging social issues. They provide support designed to improve emotional, educational and social outcomes through Chances for Children grants and, for some children whose home environment is particularly disruptive and chaotic, grants which allow them to go to boarding school.

Buttle UK offers a wide variety of support to vulnerable children and young people.

=== The BBC Children in Need Emergency Essentials programme ===
Buttle UK stopped distributing grants on behalf of BBC Children in Need in 2018. Previously they welcomed applications from referring agencies throughout the United Kingdom on behalf of children and young people aged 18 or under who are in need. Grants were generally for items such as clothing, beds, bedding, washing machines, cookers and other basic essentials.

In 2007, online grant applications were launched on the charity's website for Child Support and BBC Children in Need grants, streamlining the process and greatly reducing the response time.

=== School fees ===
The organization provides funding for school fees for at-risk children.

=== Students and trainees ===
Buttle UK has now closed this programme, but supports Estranged Young People ages 16–20. Awards financial support to young people (aged 16–20), with severe social problems, particularly those who are estranged from their parents, to attend further education and training. By funding course costs, equipment, field trips or basic day-to-day living costs, Buttle UK relieves the financial pressures and worries that often force these vulnerable young people to abandon their studies early. In 2009–2010 Buttle UK enabled 172 young people to access courses as varied as architecture, music technology, business and tree surgery.

=== Access to the Future ===
Buttle UK has now closed this programme, but supports Estranged Young People ages 16–20. Offers bespoke packages of support for hard to reach young people (aged 18–25) to aid their return to education, employment or training. Working with local partner organisations, our grants are targeted at removing the barriers to learning and work for vulnerable young people as well as funding a range of courses, activities and learning that would otherwise be unavailable. The support may vary from something like the cost of security guard training and licence, to driving lessons, or buying suitable cloths for an interview. Buttle UK aims to provide a complete package designed specifically for each young person, that will help them access a better future.

=== Estranged Young People ===
Buttle UK ran the Students and Trainees and Access to the Future Programmes successfully however analysis showed that these grants would be more impactful when focused on a certain group of young people. Therefore, a programme for estranged young people ages 16–20 offers more focused support enabling young people who have no support from their families to re-engage with education, training and employment.

== Quality Mark for Care Leavers ==
Buttle UK has now closed the Quality Mark for Care Leavers programme. It was launched in 2006 to address the specific challenges that this group of people face in higher education. The Quality Mark represents a statement of commitment for higher education (HE) institutions to sign up to which requires them to meet certain criteria demonstrating their commitment to support this group of students.

It stemmed from Buttle UK's grant giving activities. In the process of its grants programme for students and trainees it recognised that Care Leavers have a unique set of difficulties in aspiring to and progressing well through higher education. Buttle UK therefore commissioned a five-year action research study "By Degrees: Going to University from Care", in which 129 Care Leavers participated.

The commitment seeks to facilitate an increase in the number of Care Leavers entering HE, help HE institutions to identify how best to support Care Leavers, raise awareness of the needs of this group of students, enable Care Leavers to make the most of their time in HE and to complete their courses successfully, as well as contribute to a national framework to assist local authorities to fulfil their obligations to Care Leavers.

The four broad Quality Mark for Care Leaver criteria are:

1. to raise aspirations and achievements, 2. to have appropriate admissions procedures, 3. to provide entry and ongoing support, and 4. to monitor the implementation of the Commitment.

If all HE institutions work towards implementing the scheme then large steps will be made towards making the aspirations of young people leaving care achievable.

== Research – a Strategic Approach to Children’s Problems ==
Buttle UK commissions research projects. They have found this to be an effective way of obtaining knowledge to be able to target specific issues.

=== Crisis Points ===
Buttle UK worked with nkm (Mayhew Harpers Associates Ltd) to analyse 10 years worth of data from their grant giving database, representing 125,000 grant applications made from 10,000 referral agencies in the UK, to commission their Crisis Points report. The groundbreaking research revealed the many families and children currently at crisis point in the UK. Moreover, it also highlights those who are potentially falling under the radar, living in unreported poverty.

=== Your Family Your Voice : Growing up with relatives or friends ===
Buttle UK and Bristol University have received funding from the Big Lottery Fund to research kinship care. The first findings of the project were published in 2011 and were based on the 2001 census. The findings showed that more than 90% of kinship care arrangements in each region of the UK were informal agreements between parents and relatives. Therefore, carers were not entitled to financial support from social services. Poverty was a recurrent feature with 44% of kinship families were living in the poorest areas of the country. The second phase of the project involves interviewing children growing up in kinship care, and their carers and is expected to be disseminated at the end of 2012.

=== Dyslexia Action Research Project ===
This two-year action research project was funded jointly by The Frank Buttle Trust and the British Dyslexia Association (BDA). The project raised the level of awareness of the needs of children with dyslexia in the state education system and published a report "'I'm glad that I don't take No for an answer': Parent-Professional Relationships and Dyslexia Friendly Schools".

=== Parenting on a Low Income: Stress, Support and Children’s Well-being ===
Buttle UK commissioned the NSPCC and the University of York to undertake this research project, which was funded by the Big Lottery Fund. The final report was called "Living with hardship 24/7: the diverse experiences of families in poverty in England".

=== Influencing Policy ===
Buttle UK is a founder member of the charity End Child Poverty. It seeks to influence government on public policy that affects children and young people, and works collaboratively with a number of other children's charities to effect change for children.

== Change of name ==
In March 2011, The Frank Buttle Trust changed its name to Buttle UK.

== Finances ==
Buttle UK's income for the year ending March 2011 was £3.33m compared with £3.53m in the previous year.
