= Frank Buttle =

William Francis Buttle
- Frank Buttle, Date unknown
- Born: 19 October 1878; Brixton, London, England, UK
- Died: 11 February 1953; Haggerston, London, England, UK
- Citizenship: British
- Organization: Buttle UK
- Known for: Founding the Frank Buttle Trust (later Buttle UK)

Frank Buttle (19 October 1878 – 11 February 1953), was a priest of the Church of England and founder of the charity Buttle UK.

== Early life ==
William Francis Buttle was born in Brixton on 19 October 1878. He was a son of William Buttle, a solicitor, and Mary Wilby, daughter of William Henry Ward, a builder. Soon after Frank's birth, the family moved to Woldingham, near Croydon. Frank was educated at Whitgift Grammar School.

Having first trained as a solicitor, his real ambition was to become a clergyman. He went first to the University of Durham and then to Downing College, Cambridge. He was ordained in 1906 and served in a number of parishes. He was vicar of St Chad's Church, Haggerston in the London Borough of Hackney from 1937 until his death in 1953.

In December 1950, the Sunday Dispatch wrote of him:

"People who do not know the Reverend William Francis Buttle feel sorry for him as he trundles his ancient bicycle through London’s East End or shuffles along the grey streets in shoes several sizes too big for him and clothes from which the linings hang in ribbons. They do not know that he has amassed a fortune of £700,000, that he dreams of making a million, and that he will never touch a penny of it for himself. Canon Buttle, at 72, is the Church of England's most fantastic Parson – solicitor, real estate operator and shrewd share speculator – a legendary figure who some call a saint, and some a miser. In 30 years he has built up two fabulous trusts which he claims will one day educate, maintain and send out to life 1,000 children a year who are either illegitimate or from broken homes."

== Work ==
=== Child welfare issues ===
Frank Buttle was perhaps the first person to challenge the abuses of baby farming – the taking in of infants to nurse for payment – and to offer the very practical alternative of adoption. On the outbreak of war in August 1914, Buttle began his child welfare work, especially in connection with children rendered homeless and orphaned through the war. He formed the National Adoption Society, and by 1930, 3,000 adoptions had been arranged and a home for unmarried mothers was established in Surrey. It was later renamed and ultimately merged with Parents and Children Together.

=== The Frank Buttle Trust ===
Buttle's activities expanded to include the large numbers of children for whom no adopters could be found, in addition to continuing to help adopted and orphaned children.

Buttle subsequently raised £1 million to create an endowment meant to support 1000 children each year. Upon his death in 1953, he was £80,000 short of his objective. Later that year, the full amount was raised and the two "Buttle Trusts" he had originally established in 1937 were amalgamated and became operational. His brother Gladwin Buttle, physician and pharmacologist, acted as chairman of the trust from 1953 to 1974. In March 2011, The Frank Buttle Trust changed its name to Buttle UK. The endowment is worth almost £50 million today and provides around £1 million of income each year that supports the charity's running costs.
