= RAF Chivenor =

Former Royal Air Force station in Devon, England

RAF Chivenor
- Near Braunton, Devon in England
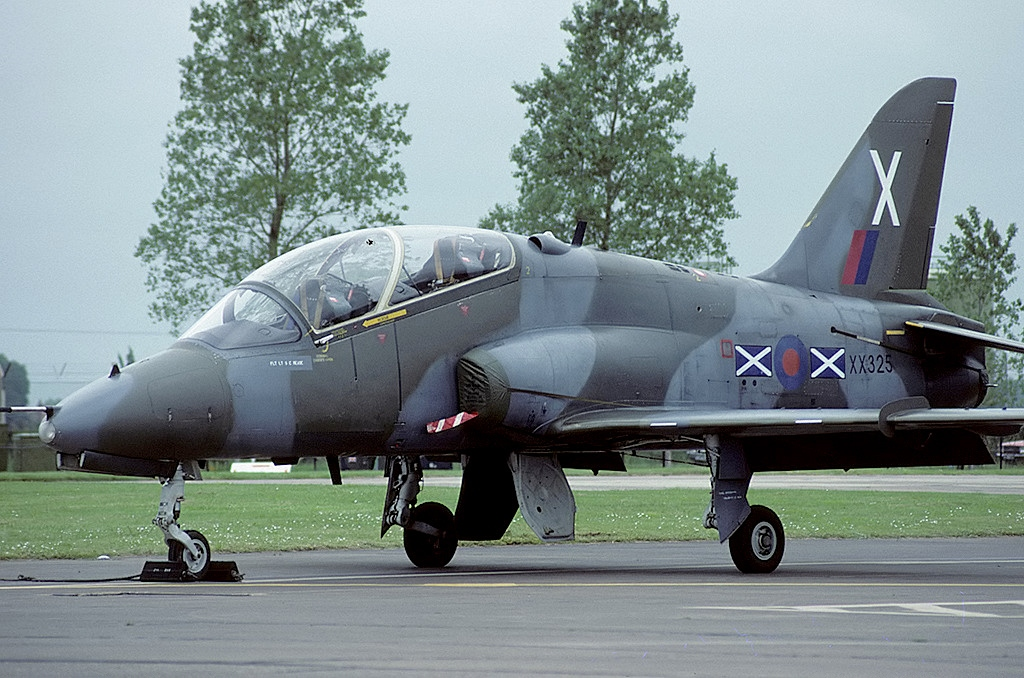
- A BAe Hawk T1 of No. 151 Squadron which was based at RAF Chivenor between 1981 and 1992.

Site information
- Type: Royal Air Force station
- Owner: Ministry of Defence
- Operator: Royal Air Force
- Controlled by: RAF Coastal Command * No. 17 Group RAF * No. 19 Group RAF
- Condition: Closed

Location
- Shown within Devon RAF Chivenor (the United Kingdom)
- Coordinates: 51°05′14″N 004°09′01″W
- Area: 222 hectares

Site history
- Built: 1940
- In use: 1940–1995
- Fate: Transferred to the Royal Marines and became RMB Chivenor.
- Battles/wars: European theatre of World War II; Cold War

Airfield information
- Identifiers: ICAO: EGDC, WMO: 03707
- Elevation: 5 metres (16 ft) AMSL
Runways
Direction	Length and surface
10/28	1,833 metres (6,014 ft) Asphalt
00/00 Wartime	Concrete
00/00 Wartime	Concrete

Royal Air Force Chivenor, or more simply RAF Chivenor, (ICAO: EGDC) is a former Royal Air Force station located on the northern shore of the River Taw estuary, on the north coast of Devon, England. The nearest towns are Barnstaple and Braunton.

Originally a civil airfield opened in the 1930s, the site was taken over by the Royal Air Force (RAF) in May 1940 for use as an RAF Coastal Command Station. After the Second World War, the station was largely used for training, particularly weapons training. During the 1950s and 1960s, No. 229 Operational Conversion Unit RAF (229 OCU) used Hawker Hunter aircraft for training. In 1974 the station was left on "care and maintenance", though No. 624 Volunteer Gliding Squadron (624 VGS) continued to fly from there. The RAF returned in 1979, forming 2 Tactical Weapons Unit (2 TWU) which flew BAE Systems Hawks, from 1979 until the unit was renamed as No. 7 Flying Training School RAF (7 FTS) in 1992. In 1994, 7 FTS left Chivenor, merging with No. 4 Flying Training School RAF (4 FTS) at RAF Valley, and the airfield was handed over to the Royal Marines. The Marines have an existing equipment testing base at RM Instow, in Instow, located across the Taw Estuary and approximately two miles from Chivenor.

No. 22 Squadron RAF (22 Sqn) operated a Search and Rescue flight at Chivenor from 1956, flying Westland Whirlwind, Westland Wessex and Westland Sea King helicopters. In a spending review that was announced over the summer of 2004, the presence of 22 Squadron at Chivenor was under review. After the flooding at Boscastle, this threat was rescinded. "A" flight of 22 Squadron was disbanded in October 2015, with the search and rescue role being assumed by Bristow Helicopters on behalf of Her Majesty's Coastguard.

In 1995, the site became Royal Marines Base Chivenor primarily used by 3 Commando Brigade.

== Etymology ==
The name Chivenor is first attested in 1285, as Chivenore. This is thought to originate in Old English as a personal name, Cifa, in its genitive form Cifan, combined with the Old English word ōra ('flat-topped ridge'). Thus the name once meant 'Cifa's flat-topped ridge'. The ridge in question runs from west to east along the north bank of the River Taw, from Heanton Punchardon to Tutshill Wood on the northern fringe of Barnstaple. Like Heanton Punchardon, RM Chivenor lies at the west end of the ridge.

== History ==
=== Founding ===
In February 1940 the Air Ministry constructed an aerodrome on the site of Chivenor farm near a civilian airfield. RAF Chivenor opened on 25 October 1940 within No. 17 Group, Coastal Command. There were two units based there initially, No. 3 (Coastal) Operational Training Unit RAF and No. 252 Squadron RAF, both operating Bristol Beaufighters, Bristol Blenheims and Bristol Beauforts.

=== 1942–1945 ===
From 1942 onward the role of Chivenor was changed from training to anti-submarine patrolling. From 1942 to 1943 the squadron flew the Armstrong Whitworth Whitley, then in 1943 the Chivenor squadron converted to the Vickers Wellington equipped with the ASV radar and Leigh lights.

November 1941 to September 1943
No. 51 Squadron RAF: (51 Sqn) Whitleys
No. 77 Squadron RAF: (77 Sqn) Whitleys / Wellingtons
No. 502 (Ulster) Squadron AAF: (502 Sqn) Whitleys / Wellingtons
No. 1417 (Leigh Light Trials) Flight: (1417 Flt) Wellington Leigh light training and development unit
July 1942 to September 1943
No. 235 Squadron RAF: (235 Sqn) Beaufighters
No. 236 Squadron RAF: (236 Sqn) Beaufighters
No. 248 Squadron RAF: (248 Sqn) Beaufighters
September 1943 to the end of the war
No. 172 Squadron RAF: (172 Sqn) Wellingtons
No. 407 Squadron RCAF: (407 Sqn) Wellingtons
No. 612 (County of Aberdeen) Squadron AAF: (612 Sqn) Wellingtons
No. 304 Polish Bomber Squadron: (304 Sqn) Wellingtons
Plan for post war 1945
No. 14 Squadron RAF (14 Sqn)
No. 36 Squadron RAF (36 Sqn)

In November 1941 the structure of the base changed with three new squadrons 51, 77 and 502 flying a mixture of Whitleys and Wellingtons, and one new flight, 1417, that was used to training crews on the Leigh light and radar Wellingtons. In July 1942 three squadrons of Beaufighter were located at Chivenor to offer long range protection in the Bay of Biscay. By September 1943 all of the Whitleys had been taken out of active service at Chivenor, and four squadrons of Wellingtons, 172, 407, 612 and 304, were located at the base. No 172 was the Wellington Training Squadron, taking over from 1417 Flight. The base had personnel from Canada, Poland and the UK. The Plan for the post war, was for Chivenor to become a full-time anti-submarine wing with two squadron's 14 and 36 Squadron.

=== 1946—1949 ===
After the Second World War ended, the future of the station was not certain. In 1946 a group of miscellaneous meteorological and anti-aircraft units moved to Chivenor, including Handley Page Halifaxes of Nos 517 and 521 Squadrons which flew 10-hour sorties to collect weather information. At the same time the station played host to No 248 Squadron (de Havilland Mosquitoes), No 254 Squadron (Beaufighters), and the Supermarine Spitfires and Miles Martinets of No 691 Squadron, Army Air Corps. In October 1946, No. 11 Group RAF Fighter Command took command of the station with No. 203 Advanced Flying School. This lasted until July 1949 when the station was transferred to 5 and 7 Squadrons, Army Air Corps and No. 1 Overseas Ferry Unit. This latter unit had the duties to ferry Gloster Meteors, de Havilland Vampires and Mosquitoes to the Middle East and the Far East.

=== 1950—1974 ===
In February 1950 the Chivenor station flight was formed with de Havilland Tiger Moths. It was at this time that post-war civilian flying restarted, with Wrafton flying club later changing its name to the Puffin flying club. At this time the RAF was operating as No. 229 Operational Conversion Unit which flew Vampires and Meteors. Then in mid 1955 the first of the Hawker Hunter operational conversion courses was started: flying was still mainly on the Vampire FB5 with approximately 20 hrs on the Hunter F1 before pilots were sent to their operational squadrons. During the next two years the Vampires were phased out and the course became all Hunter once the Hunter T7, a two-seater trainer version, became available. There were 2 squadrons called simply 1 and 2, each capable of training a student from conversion to operational and weaponry training. Operational Units were 229 OCU, consisting of 2 squadrons and Chivenor Station Flight.

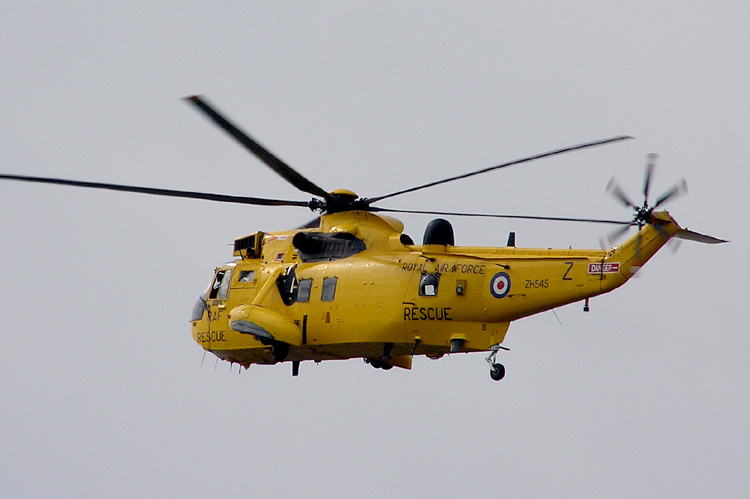
Sea King helicopter of 22 Squadron

In May 1957 the RAF exercise 'Vigilant' changed Chivenor's Squadrons' status. They assumed a wartime reserve role and were renumbered as Nos 145 and 234 Squadrons. The squadrons were now flying the Hunter F4 and T7 until the F4 was replaced by the F6. The two squadrons were numbered and then renumbered until they became 63 (Reserve) and 79 (Reserve) Squadrons, tasked with training RAF fighter pilots. Hunter FR.10 fighter reconnaissance aircraft were also flown by 229 OCU in the late 1960s and early 1970s. In March 1967 the oil tanker Torrey Canyon ran aground on Seven Stones Reef near Lands End, spilling oil. For three days, Hunters from Chivenor and other bases fired training rockets at the ship to hole it below the waterline, before bombing it with high explosives and napalm in an unsuccessful effort to burn off the oil. The final Hunter unit based at Chivenor was the Singapore Operational Training Flight. In 1974, 229 OCU was transferred to RAF Brawdy and the station was put into a rebuilding programme. It was in June 1957 that a new chapter in Chivenor's story started with the arrival of 'E' Flight 275 Squadron with their Bristol Sycamore HR14s on search and rescue duties. In 1958 'E' Flight changed to 'A' Flight 22 Squadron, which has over 50 years of twenty-four-hour search and rescue experience operating from Chivenor.

=== Hawks at RAF Chivenor ===
In 1979 the RAF rebuilding programme ended and the station was reactivated, hosting 2 TWU, flying British Aerospace Hawk T1's with No. 63 Squadron RAF (63(R)) and No. 151 Squadron RAF (151(R)) squadrons, training fast jet pilots and navigators. In 1992, the government's options for change defence review resulted in the structure of the station changing with 2 TWU being re-designated as No. 7 Flying Training School RAF (7 FTS), the squadrons changing identities from 63(R) and 151(R) to No. 19 Squadron RAF (19(R)) and No. 92 Squadron RAF (92(R)). 7 FTS operated in conjunction with No. 4 Flying Training School RAF (4 FTS) at RAF Valley, as the so-called Mirror Image Training Course which lasted for three years until 1995. when the Ministry of Defence (MOD) announced that RAF Chivenor would close, which it did on 1 October 1995.

== Operational Units ==
=== 1979-1992 ===
2 TWU
No. 63(R) Squadron RAF
No. 151(R) Squadron RAF

=== 1992-1995 ===
7 FTS
No. 19(R) Squadron RAF
No. 92(R) Squadron RAF

== Post-RAF use ==
From 1 October 1995 onwards, the Royal Marines took control of the base, it being renamed Royal Marines Base Chivenor (RMB Chivenor) and is home to the Commando Logistics Regiment, Royal Marines and 24 Commando Regiment Royal Engineers.

The airfield is still an operational airfield used by the Royal Navy, Royal Marines and RAF as well as No. 624 Volunteer Gliding Squadron RAF (624 VGS) operating Grob Vigilant T1 motor gliders, providing flights for the Air Training Corps and Combined Cadet Force.
