= Aftermath of the Falklands War =

Events following the conclusion of the Falklands War in Argentina

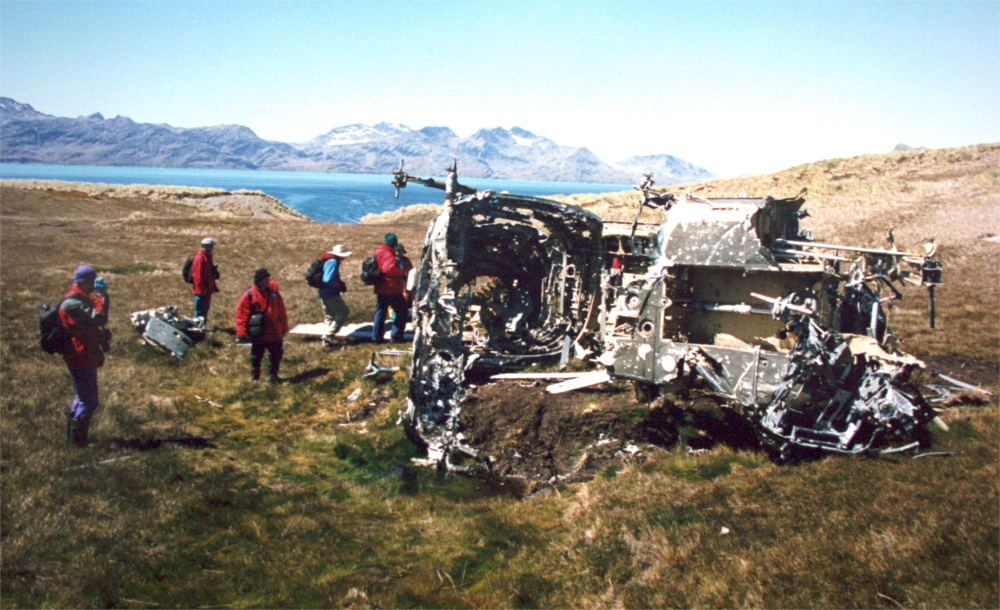
Remains of a helicopter shot down in South Georgia Island during Falklands War. (Photo taken 1999)

The aftermath of the 1982 Falklands War between the United Kingdom and Argentina affected world geopolitics, the local political culture in Argentina and the UK, military thought, medical treatment, and the lives of those who were directly involved in the war.

== Political aftermath ==
Diplomatic relations between the UK and Argentina were not restored until 1989 under a formula which put the issue of sovereignty to one side (the sovereignty umbrella) and established a framework within which further talks on matters of mutual interest could be held.

=== Argentina ===
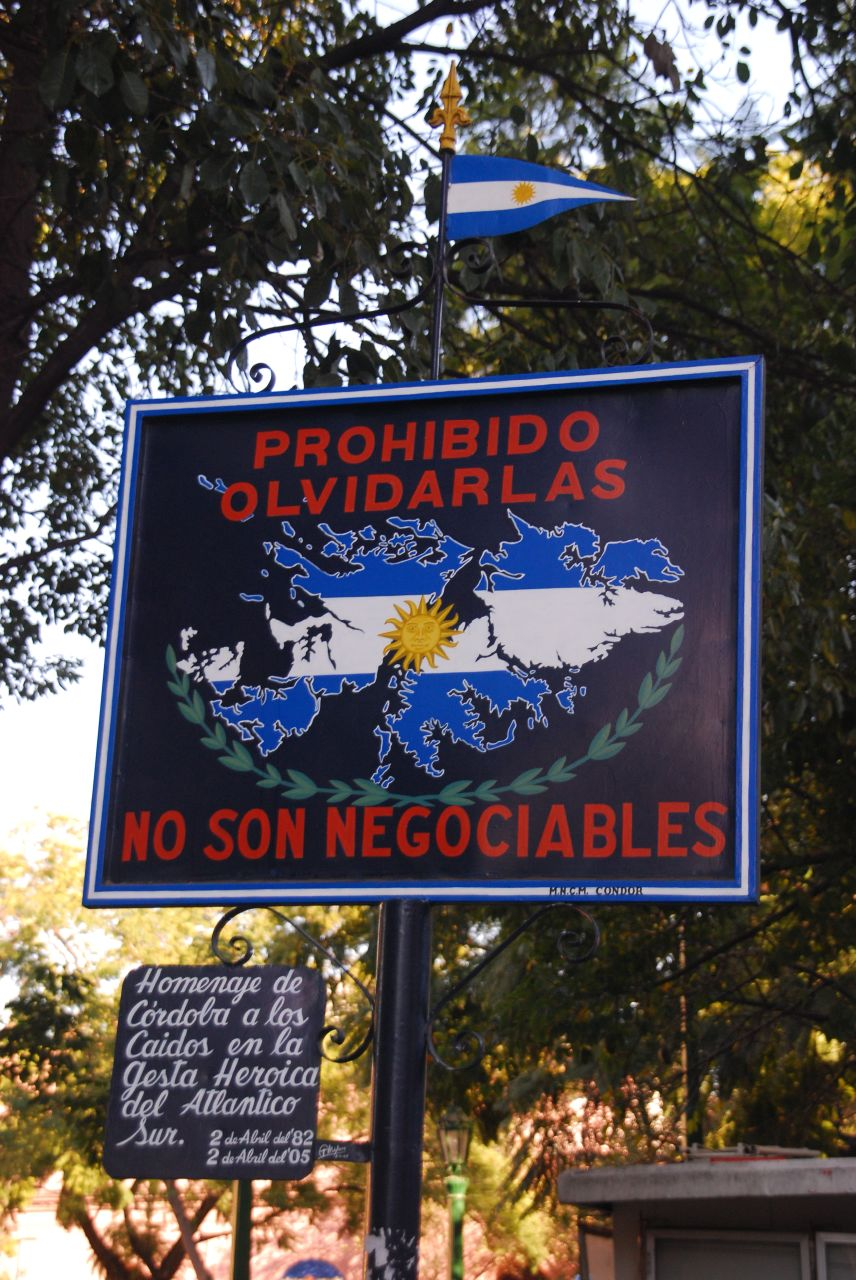
Falklands War memorial in Córdoba, Argentina

The Argentine loss of the war led to ever-larger protests against the Galtieri regime and is credited with giving the final push to drive out the military junta that had overthrown Isabel Perón in 1976 and perpetrated the crimes of the Dirty War. Galtieri was forced to resign and elections were held on 30 October 1983 and a new president, Raúl Alfonsín, the Radical Civic Union (UCR) party candidate, took office on 10 December 1983, defeating Italo Luder, the candidate for the Justicialist Party (Peronist movement). In the long term the debacle concluded both the periodic intervention of the Argentine military in politics since the 1930s and the Peronist electoral hegemony since 1945.

In 2009, Argentine authorities in Comodoro Rivadavia ratified a decision made by authorities in Río Grande, Tierra del Fuego (which, according to Argentina, have authority over the islands) charging 70 officers and corporals with inhumane treatment of conscript soldiers during the war. "We have testimony from 23 people about a soldier who was shot to death by a corporal, four other former combatants who starved to death, and at least 15 cases of conscripts who were staked out on the ground", Pablo Vassel, under-secretary of human rights in the province of Corrientes, told Inter Press Service News Agency. There are claims that false testimonies were used as evidence in accusing the Argentine officers and NCOs and Vassel had to step down from his post as under-secretary of human rights of Corrientes in 2010.

=== The Falkland Islands ===
The Falkland Islands remained a self-governing British overseas territory, but shortly after the war the British Nationality (Falkland Islands) Act 1983 granted the Islanders British citizenship (replacing British Dependent Territories citizenship), strengthening the link between the Islanders and the UK.

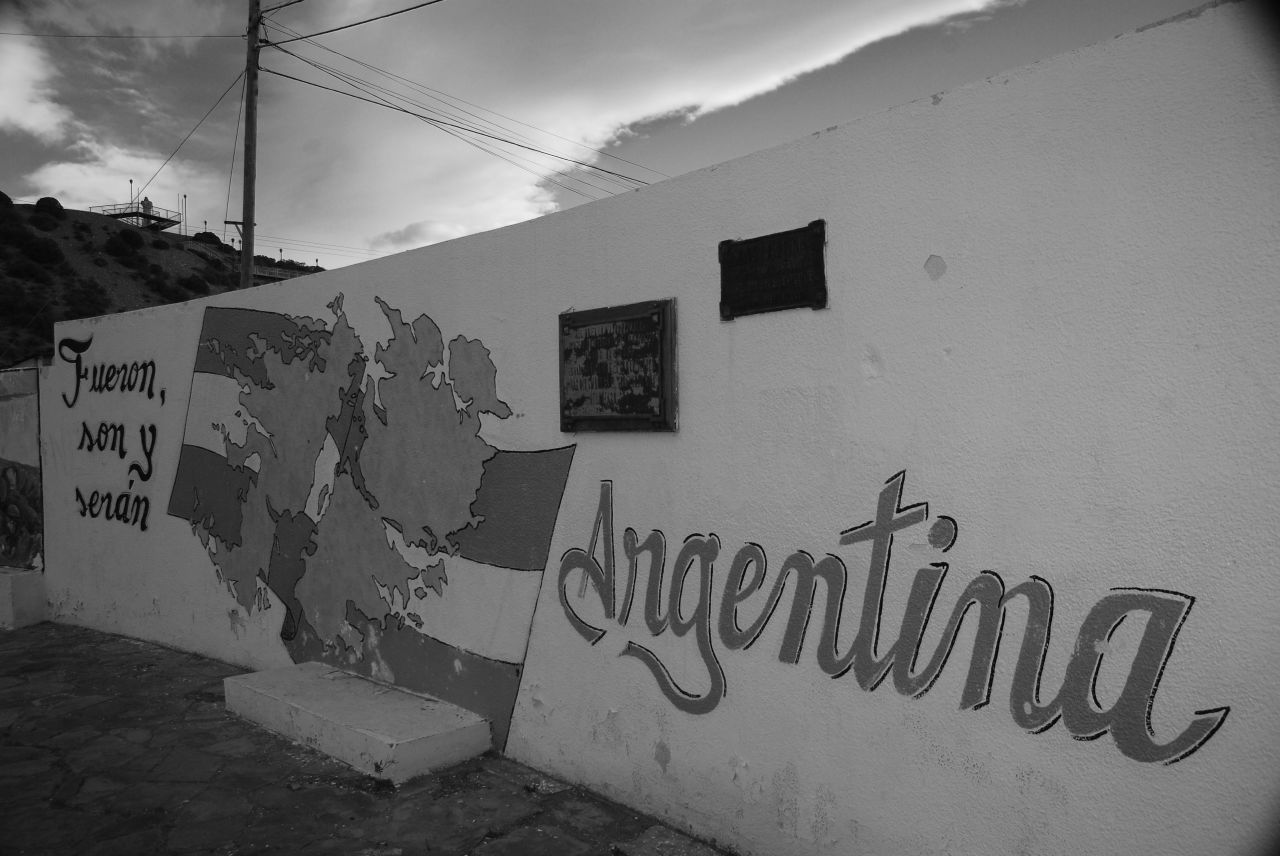
According to the Argentine Constitution, the claim to the Falkland Islands is an inalienable cause of the Argentine people. Mural in Los Antiguos, Santa Cruz province.

The economy also benefited indirectly from UK military investment and directly from development of fisheries. The future of the Falkland Islanders' link to the UK has been more certain as a result of the war, and the Islands' government remains committed to self-determination and British sovereignty. The only civilian deaths during the war were three women who were killed when a Royal Navy shell hit the house they were sheltering in during a naval bombardment of military targets inside Stanley itself.

=== United Kingdom ===
For the United Kingdom, the war cost 258 men, 6 ships (10 others suffered varying degrees of battle damage), 34 aircraft, and £2.778 billion (£9.255 billion in 2018), but the campaign was considered a great victory for the United Kingdom. The months following the war saw the popularity of the Conservative Government increase, with some attributing this rise to the aftermath of the war with others suggesting that the rise in popularity was due to an increase in economic optimism, with the war increasing productivity by 3%. The war did however cause several members of the government to resign, including the Foreign Secretary Lord Carrington, the most recent time that a UK government minister resigned openly in response to a failure of his department (in not anticipating the war).

Criticism was levelled at Ted Rowlands, a former junior foreign minister in the preceding government, who disclosed in Parliament in April 1982 that the British had broken the Argentine diplomatic codes. As the same code machines were used by the Argentine military, this disclosure immediately served to deny British access to valuable intelligence. This, and other responses to parliamentary questions, and leaks of information to the BBC has been alleged by historian Hugh Bicheno to be a deliberate attempt to undermine the Thatcher government on the part of a variety of individuals who had a vested interest in its fall. There is some debate as to the accuracy of the claims regarding Ted Rowlands. Mark Urban in his book UK Eyes Alpha makes reference to a "figure intimate with the workings of GCHQ" who suggested that Rowlands's comment had no noticeable effect.

Ultimately, the successful conclusion of the war gave a noticeable fillip to British patriotic feeling, with the mobilisation of national identity encapsulated in the so-called "Falklands Factor". Since the failure of the 1956 Suez campaign, the end of Empire and the economic decline of the 1970s which culminated in the Winter of Discontent, Britain had been beset by uncertainty and anxiety about its international role, status and capability. With the war successfully concluded, Thatcher was returned to power with an increased Parliamentary majority and felt empowered to press ahead with the economic readjustments of Thatcherism.

A second major effect was a reaffirmation of the special relationship between the US and UK. Both Reagan and Weinberger (his Secretary of Defense) were appointed honorary Knights Commander of the Order of the British Empire (KBE) for their help in the campaign, but the more obvious result was the common alignment of Britain and the US in a more confrontational foreign policy against the Soviet bloc, sometimes known as the Second Cold War.

In 2007 the British government expressed regrets over the deaths on both sides in the war. Margaret Thatcher was quoted as saying "in the struggle against evil... we can all today draw hope and strength" from the Falklands victory, while former Argentine President Néstor Kirchner claimed while in office that the UK won a colonial victory and vowed that the islands would one day return to Argentine sovereignty. He qualified this, however, with an affirmation that force could never again be used in an attempt to bring this about.

=== United States and Latin America ===
The United States' reputation in parts of Latin America was damaged because of the perception that it had broken the Rio Treaty (Inter-American Treaty of Reciprocal Assistance or TIAR) by providing the UK with military supplies. US security policy was seen by Latin Americans to prioritise East–West relations over hemispheric interests.

In September 2001 the then President of Mexico Vicente Fox cited the Falklands War as proof of the failure of the TIAR.

Regarding the attitude of the Latin American governments, K. J. Holsti presents another sight of the South American dilemma: "While South American governments (except Chile) publicly supported Argentina in its conflict with Great Britain, in private many governments were pleased with the outcome of the war. Argentina's bellicosity against Chile over the Beagle Channel problem ... [its] foreign intervention ([in] Bolivia and Nicaragua) ... and [its] propounded geopolitical doctrines that were seen in other countries as threatening to them". So, according to David R. Mares, "Brazilian military analysts worried about the problems of having a successful and belligerent Argentina as neighbour".

For Chile, engaged with Argentina in a long-standing territorial dispute over the Cape Horn islands, the outcome of the war averted a planned Argentine military invasion of Chile and made possible the Treaty of Peace and Friendship of 1984 between Chile and Argentina.

=== Visit of Pope John Paul II ===
In May 1982, Pope John Paul II carried out a long-scheduled visit to the United Kingdom. In view of the crisis it was decided that this should be balanced with an unscheduled trip to Argentina in June. It is contended that his presence and words spiritually prepared Argentines for a possible defeat, contrary to the propaganda issued by the Junta. He returned to Argentina in 1987 after the return of democratic government.

== Military analysis ==
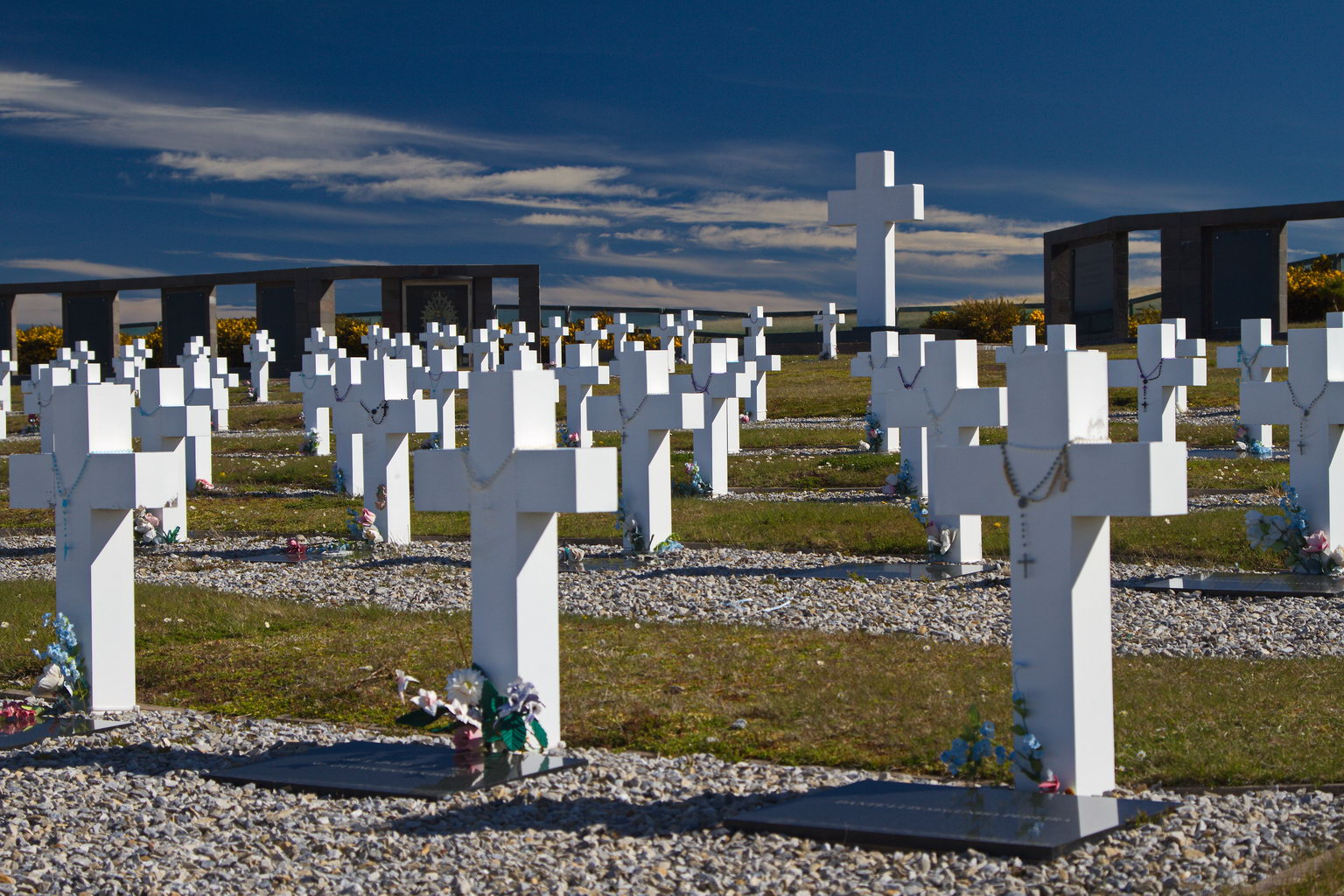
Argentine military Cemetery on East Falkland (2013).

Militarily, the Falklands conflict remains one of the largest major conflicts since the end of the Second World War. It was the first major naval campaign of the 'missile age' and is considered the largest amphibious operation since the Korean War. As such, it has been the subject of intense study by military analysts and historians. Significant "lessons learned" include the vulnerability of surface ships to anti-ship missiles and submarines, the challenges of coordinating logistical support for a long-distance projection of power, and reconfirmation of the role of tactical air power, including the use of helicopters. Additionally, it offers lessons in the areas of "force projection", "forcible entry" and "expeditionary warfare".

=== Vulnerability of surface ships ===
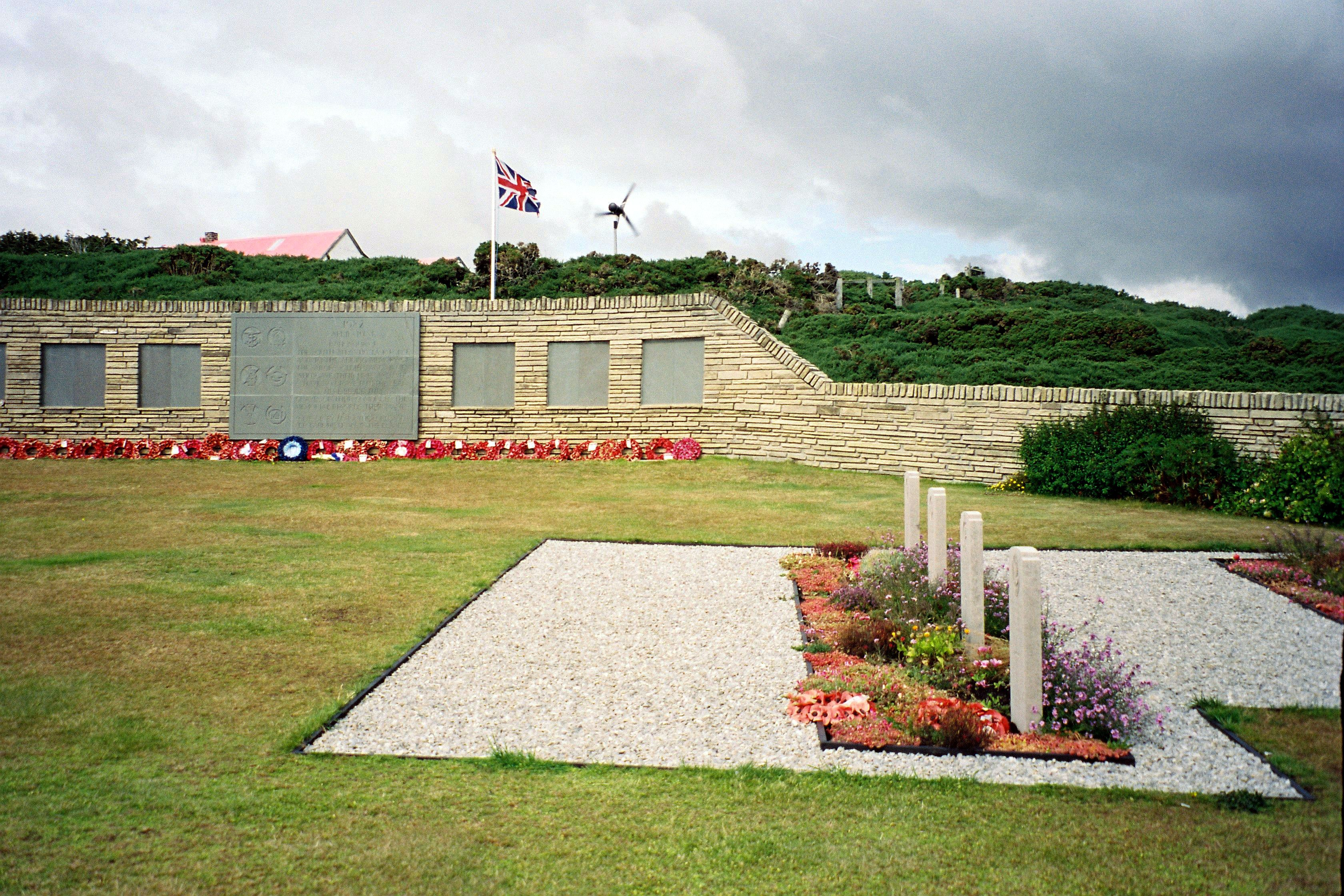
Blue Beach Military Cemetery at San Carlos in East Falkland

In his book The Price of Admiralty, military historian Sir John Keegan noted that the brief conflict showed the incurable vulnerability of surface ships to anti-ship missiles, and, most importantly, to submarines: despite the seemingly limited consequences of the war, it confirmed the dominance of the submarine in naval warfare. This is especially so, Keegan argues, because submarines are far less vulnerable than aircraft to counterattack, being able to approach and destroy their targets with almost complete impunity.

However, many prominent naval tacticians have recently disputed this point, arguing that the sinking of the ARA General Belgrano was the result of a modern nuclear-powered submarine hunting a pre-World War II ship with no anti-submarine capabilities, and the British ships sunk by the Argentine Air Force were acceptable casualties since they were screening forces, either for the British aircraft carriers in the cases of HMS Sheffield and even Atlantic Conveyor, or for the amphibious landing forces as with HMS Coventry, HMS Ardent and HMS Antelope.

=== Role of air power ===
Neither side achieved total air supremacy; nonetheless, air power proved to be of critical importance during the conflict, due to the isolated, rough landscape of the Falklands in which the mobility of land forces was restricted. Air strikes were staged against ground, sea and air targets on both sides, and often with clear results. All of the UK losses at sea were caused by aircraft or missile strikes (by both the Argentine Air Force and Naval Aviation). The French Exocet missile proved its lethality in air-to-surface operations, leading to retrofitting of most major ships with Close-in weapon systems (CIWS).

The air war in the Falklands vindicated the UK decision to maintain at least the STOVL aircraft carriers after the retirement of HMS Ark Royal. The domination of air power in major naval engagements was demonstrated, along with the usefulness of carriers and it proved the small but manoeuvrable Sea Harrier as a true fighter. Sea Harriers shot down 21 aircraft with no air-to-air losses themselves, although six were lost to ground fire and accidents.

The disparity in figures, with the Argentine fighters failing to shoot down a single Sea Harrier, can be explained by several factors, including limited fighter control that was provided by British warships in San Carlos Water, the then almost unparalleled Blue Fox radar, and the extreme manoeuvrability of the Sea Harrier. Additionally the British had the latest AIM-9L Sidewinder missiles (a gift from USA), while the only Argentine planes with air-to-air missiles for self-defence were the Mirages. The AIM-9Ls had a much wider angle of engagement than the earlier versions employed by the Argentines, which could only effectively engage the rear quarter of an enemy aircraft. The fact that heat seeking Sidewinders were targeting hot jet exhausts against a cold background of the South Atlantic in winter resulted in a lethality rate of over 80 percent. The only advantage of the Argentine jets was their higher maximum speed, but Argentine pilots could not benefit from this unless they risked running out of fuel, as was seen in the first air combat of the war when a Mirage IIIEA was forced to attempt a landing at Stanley.

The importance of Airborne Early Warning (AEW) was shown. The Royal Navy had effectively no over-the-horizon radar capability. This was hastily rectified after the war, with Sea King helicopters fitted with radomes containing a variant of the Nimrod ASW aircraft's Searchwater radar. These first travelled south after the war on the brand new HMS Illustrious, sister ship to Invincible (R05).

The usefulness of helicopters in combat, logistic, and casevac operations was confirmed.

=== Logistics ===
The logistical capability of the UK armed forces was stretched to the limit in order to mount an amphibious operation so far from a land base, in mountainous islands with few roads. After the war much work was done to improve both the logistical and amphibious capability of the Royal Navy. Task force commander Rear Admiral Sir Sandy Woodward referred to the conflict as "a lot closer run than many would care to believe", reflecting the naval and military belief that few people understood—or understand—the extent to which the logistical dimension made the war a difficult operation for the UK.

Royal Navy communication was hindered during the conflict due to misinterpretation and lack of clear Rules of Engagement(ROE) which had to be forwarded from the Ministry of Defense to the Prime Minister in order to establish clear orders. When the British Navy was engaged with two Argentine Navy forces using a pincer tactic, Admiral Woodward who was in charge of the Royal Navy during the conflict, bypassed the delays in getting the ROE changed by ordering the British nuclear submarine, Conqueror, to fire on the oncoming Argentine naval vessels with his permission. The admiral's judgement call highlighted the flaws in the ROE approval process and would improve British communications.

The ships of the task force could only remain on station for a limited time in the worsening southern hemisphere winter. With such a high proportion of the Royal Navy's surface fleet engaged, or lost in combat, there were few units available for northbound traffic. At the core of the fleet, Invincible could possibly have been replaced by the hastily prepared Illustrious or the loaned USS Iwo Jima (LPH-2), but there was no replacement available for Hermes, the larger of the two British carriers. Woodward's strategy, therefore, required the land war to be won before Hermes, in particular, succumbed to the harsh environment. Woodward called the operation "a damned close-run thing", quoting the Duke of Wellington after the Battle of Waterloo.

=== Special forces ===
The usefulness of special forces units was reaffirmed. British special forces destroyed many Argentine aircraft (notably in the SAS raid on Pebble Island) and carried out highly informative intelligence-gathering operations. Contrary to popular understanding, the Argentine special forces also patrolled hard, in appalling climatic conditions, against a professional enemy and showed that they could sometimes get the upper hand.

=== Uniforms ===
The Nylon working dress worn by Royal Navy personnel was shown to be hazardous during shipboard fires, in the case of the Exocet attack on HMS Sheffield (D80), a Naval Board of Inquiry reported:

synthetics had a tendency to melt onto the skin, causing more severe burns than if the crew had been wearing non-synthetic clothing.

Survivors and medical staff also noted that burning nylon worsened casualties, complicated treatment, and introduced contaminants into wounds. As a result, the Royal Navy progressively replaced synthetic uniforms with cotton-based, flame-retardant clothing in the aftermath of the conflict.

=== Captured Argentine equipment ===
Eight Argentine Bell UH-1H Iroquois helicopters were captured intact after the Argentine surrender. Of these, three (AE-409, AE-413 and AE-422) were pressed into service by the British Army in the Falklands for mail and freight transport. AE-413 was later restored to operational standard and subsequently sold on the civilian market. It has appeared in several films, including the James Bond production The Living Daylights. AE-422 was restored to a non-flyable condition and is now on display at the Fleet Air Arm Museum, located at RNAS Yeovilton in Somerset.

Two Argentine Army Agusta A 109 helicopters were captured intact and shipped to Great Britain, where they were serviced, repainted, and registered. Based at Hereford, they were used to support special forces operations until 2009. One, preserved in its Argentine Army colours, is now on display at the Fleet Air Arm Museum.

A damaged SA 330 Puma (Z449) belonging to the Argentine Coast Guard was initially used as an instructional airframe in the United Kingdom. It was upgraded to HC1 standard in 2001 and certified for flight. The aircraft saw limited service in Iraq during Operation Telic. In 2012, it was deemed no longer "Airworthy Repairable" and returned to instructional use at Whittington Barracks, near Lichfield.

The Argentine Boeing CH-47 Chinook AE-520 (c/n B-797) was captured intact and subsequently used as a ground instructional airframe in the United Kingdom. Its rear section was later removed and fitted to RAF Chinook HC2 ZA704, which had been damaged in a flying accident in Oman. In RAF service, the hybrid aircraft has been informally referred to as Frankenhook, although unconfirmed in any authoritative source.

Fifteen Oerlikon GDF-002 35 mm twin anti-aircraft guns and six Skyguard radar units were captured in working order. These were refurbished under Operation Skyguard and brought into service with the Royal Auxiliary Air Force in 1985, deployed for airfield defence at RAF Waddington. They remained in service until the early 1990s.

A complete AN/TPS-43 3D air-search radar was captured intact near Stanley. It was refurbished and entered RAF service for UK airspace monitoring.

A Roland-2 surface-to-air missile system was also seized in operational condition. Though not adopted, it was sent to the UK for technical evaluation.

The patrol boat Islas Malvinas was captured intact at Port Stanley and commissioned into Royal Navy service as HMS Tiger Bay. She served locally until being decommissioned and sold in 1986.

Of the twelve or more Panhard AML armoured cars captured, some were expended as targets on the islands, but two were taken to the United Kingdom as war trophies; one by the Parachute Regiment, which was eventually donated to The Tank Museum, and one by the Blues and Royals, which is kept at Bulford Camp and was restored in 2022.

=== Impact on the Royal Navy ===
Strained by two oil crises (1973 and 1979), the United Kingdom's government desired to cut defence spending in line with the rest of Europe. Many former British possessions in Africa and Asia had gained independence from the UK by the 1980s. Due to this decolonisation, successive British governments investigated closing British overseas bases and reducing the UK's armed forces in the belief that capabilities such as a blue-water navy were no longer required. The Conservative government's Defence Secretary John Nott produced a white paper in 1981 proposing major cuts for the navy in the next ten years (the army and the RAF had already been tailored for NATO.)

Denis Healey, the Defence Secretary in 1966, once said that aircraft carriers were required only for operations involving 'landing or withdrawal of troops against sophisticated opposition outside range of land-based air cover'. When the last conventional carrier in the Royal Navy, HMS Ark Royal, was decommissioned in 1978, the pro-carrier lobby succeeded in acquiring light carriers (euphemistically christened 'through deck cruisers') equipped with VTOL Sea Harriers as well as helicopters, justified by the fact that one of their primary roles was anti-submarine warfare. John Nott's defence review concluded that anti-submarine defence would be performed more cheaply by a smaller number of destroyers and frigates. The carrier HMS Hermes was therefore to be scrapped and HMS Invincible sold to Australia. Under the review, the Royal Navy was focused primarily on anti-submarine warfare under the auspices of NATO. Any out-of-area amphibious operations were considered unlikely. The entire Royal Marines was in jeopardy of being disbanded and the sale of HMS Intrepid and HMS Fearless was mooted.

In 1980, low funding caused many ships to be in harbour for months due to lack of spare parts and fuel. The largest cut in the Royal Navy's conventional forces led to the resignation of the Navy Minister Keith Speed in 1981. Sea battles, mass convoys, amphibious landings, and coastal bombardments were considered obsolete in the second half of the 20th century. The head of the admiralty, First Sea Lord Admiral Sir Henry Leach, was still fighting the cuts in the Ministry of Defence together with the Chief of Defence Staff, who by chance, was also a naval officer – Admiral of the Fleet Sir Terence Lewin.

At the onset of the crisis, First Sea Lord Sir Henry Leach was summoned to brief the Prime Minister. He claimed that Britain was able to recapture the islands, and that it should be done. "Since here was a clear, imminent threat to British overseas territory that could only be reached by sea, what the hell was the point in having a Navy if it was not used for this sort of thing?". Aware of the necessity for speed, Leach had already given orders for the ships of a potential task force to be prepared for deployment. On 2 April, at a briefing at the House of Commons, Leach advised the Prime Minister that a task force was necessary and could sail within 48 hours. Lewin, who was forced to return from a scheduled visit to New Zealand, also impressed on the War Cabinet that the primary objective for the United Kingdom should be: "to bring about the withdrawal of Argentine forces from the Falkland Islands, and the re-establishment of British administration there, as quickly as possible". Inspired, Thatcher ordered the despatch of the Task Force for the South Atlantic.

The principal adjustments to British defence policy as a result of the war were announced in the December 1982 Defence White Paper. After the war, the sale of HMS Invincible to Australia was cancelled, with Hermes offered instead (eventually being sold to India as INS Viraat in 1986), and the operational status of all three support carriers was maintained. The proposed cutback in the surface fleet was abandoned and replacements for many of the lost ships and helicopters plus more Sea Harriers were ordered. The amphibious assault ships HMS Intrepid and HMS Fearless were not decommissioned until 1999 and 2002, respectively, being replaced by HMS Albion and HMS Bulwark.

A RN ship is always present in the South Atlantic. In 2007, the Royal Navy confirmed its commitment to a carrier force with the order of two Queen Elizabeth-class carriers. In 2012 on the thirtieth anniversary of the war, the air-defence destroyer HMS Dauntless visited the Falkland Islands. Since 2015, the Royal Navy has limited its surface presence in the South Atlantic to an Offshore Patrol Vessel on station around the islands and to an ice patrol ship deployed during the South Atlantic summer season. However, both army and RAF units remain deployed at RAF Mount Pleasant in the islands.

=== Impact on the Argentine Armed Forces ===
The war's outcome had an indelible impact on the Argentine Armed Forces. The war destroyed the military's image as the "moral reserve of the nation" that they had maintained through most of the 20th century. After 1984, democratic governments in Argentina did not generally approve major military equipment purchases. Argentina's military spending has also been steadily reduced and as of 2010, its devotion of 0.9% of GDP to defence only exceeded Suriname within South America. Within the defence budget itself funding for training and even basic maintenance was significantly cut, a factor contributing to the accidental loss of the Argentine submarine San Juan in 2017. With the United Kingdom also taking active diplomatic measures to restrict even modest Argentine military modernization efforts, the result has been a steady erosion of Argentine military capabilities, with some arguing that Argentina had, by the end of the 2010s, ceased to be a capable military power.

=== Soviet Union ===
For the Soviet Union and Warsaw Pact militaries, the Falklands War forced a re-examination of their estimates in the quality of Western troops and in particularly, how well an all-volunteer force would compare against conscripted forces. The Soviets became aware that the British relied heavily on the quality and training of their personnel to compensate for the extreme logistical difficulties the campaign presented. It was also noted that both sides were using many of the same western made weapon systems, their combat performance and effectiveness information collected during and after the war was analyzed by the Soviets, to be used to create counter-combat strategies to be adopted by their forces in an event of a then-possible war against NATO.

=== Weapon export controls ===
The Coordinating Committee for Multilateral Export Controls (CoCom) approved numerous weapon export exceptions during the 1970s and early 1980s, permitting Western-origin military hardware to reach Argentina prior to the 1982 invasion. Economic measures were wound down within weeks of Argentina's surrender, with controls relaxed piecemeal by individual suppliers.

- The United States terminated the economic sanctions it had imposed in April 1982 on 12 July 1982
- France lifted a temporary restriction on certain arms deliveries on 10 August 1982, allowing the completion of pre-existing orders
- The Federal Republic of Germany maintained an embargo until 22 September 1982, after which deliveries under contract resumed or were completed

Developments were uneven, subject to differing national definitions of embargoes, outstanding contracts, and political pressure; consequently, restrictions on military exports were removed or modified at different times by different states rather than by any single, cohesive decision.

=== Allegations of nuclear deployment ===
In 1982, British warships were routinely armed with the WE.177, a tactical nuclear weapon with a variable yield of either 10 kilotons or 0.5 kiloton, which was used as a Nuclear Depth Bomb in an antisubmarine role. The Official History describes the contorted logistical arrangements that led to the removal of the nuclear depth bombs from the frigates, following political alarm in Whitehall. Eventually at least some of the depth bombs were brought back to the UK by an RFA vessel. In December 2003, Argentine President Néstor Kirchner demanded an apology from the British government for the "regrettable and monstrous" act of arming warships engaged in the conflict with nuclear depth charges.

== Intelligence analysis ==
=== MI6 activity ===
In his 2002 memoirs Sir John Nott, Britain's Secretary of State for Defence during the conflict, made following disclosure regarding the activities of the UK's Secret Intelligence Service (MI6):

I authorised our agents to pose as bona fide purchasers of equipment on the international market, ensuring that we outbid the Argentines, and other agents identified Exocet missiles in markets and rendered them inoperable.

=== Norwegian intelligence ===
According to a documentary by the Norwegian Broadcasting Corporation (NRK), during the war a Norwegian Intelligence Service facility situated at Fauske in the northern county of Nordland regularly intercepted Soviet satellite intelligence data, which was forwarded to the Northwood Headquarters. Said "a high-ranking British military source":

When the war broke out, we ourselves almost didn’t have any intelligence information from this area. It was here we got help from the Norwegians, who gave us a stream of information about the Argentine warships' positions. The information came to us all the time and straight to our war headquarters at Northwood. The information was continuously updated and told us exactly where the Argentine ships were.

=== Soviet intervention ===
According to Russian journalist Sergei Brilev, whose claims were reported in The Times on 2 April 2010, Argentina may have received satellite imagery of British positions from the Soviet Union during the conflict.

== Legal ==
In 2005, an Argentine film called Blessed by Fire exposed the mistreatment of Argentine conscripts during the war. That film "led directly to a criminal investigation" which resulted in the filing of formal charges of crimes against humanity against 70 Argentine military officers for the alleged abuse, torture and, in one case, murder of their own troops. However, the Comodoro Rivadavia Criminal Cassation Court ruled that tortures suffered by soldiers are not crimes against humanity thus the Argentine statute of limitations was applicable, and since that time limit had already been exceeded, the court therefore dismissed ["prescribed", in Argentine legal language] the case. On appeal to a higher court, the Comodoro Rivadavia Federal Chamber upheld the lower court's ruling.

== Medical ==
=== Survival and recovery of wounded British soldiers ===
During the field actions, some wounded British soldiers lay in freezing conditions for hours before receiving medical aid, but no British serviceman who reached a medical aid station subsequently died. This was confirmed by Surgeon Commander Rick Jolly, the Medical Officer in charge of the refrigeration plant hospital at Ajax Bay (nicknamed "The Red and Green Life Machine" by the medics). Many recovered more fully than contemporary medical opinion anticipated. Possible contributing factors included the extreme cold, the levels of physical fitness among the troops, and the familiarity of British medical staff, most notably Jolly himself, with high-velocity gunshot wounds acquired during his service in Northern Ireland during The Troubles.

=== Medical and psychological treatment of Falklands veterans ===
The British Ministry of Defence was accused several times of a systematic failure to prepare service personnel for the horrors of war and to provide adequate care for them afterwards.

There are allegations that the Ministry of Defence has tried to ignore the issue of post-traumatic stress disorder (PTSD), which left many sufferers emotionally scarred and unable to work, immersed in social dislocation, alcoholism, and depression. Veterans have suffered prolonged personality disorders, flashbacks, and anxiety sometimes reaching pathological levels.

It has been claimed that more veterans have committed suicide since the Falklands War ended than the number of servicemen killed in action. The South Atlantic Medal Association (SAMA82), which represents and helps Falklands veterans, believes that some 264 veterans had taken their own lives by 2002, a number exceeding the 255 who died in active service, although no estimate is available for the expected number of suicides that would have occurred anyway.

A comprehensive statistical study of the deaths of personnel deployed to the Falklands since the end of the conflict was published by Defence Analytical Services and Advice (DASA) on Tuesday 14 May 2013. The study found that:

| 25,948 | UK Armed Forces personnel served in the Falklands Campaign |
| 237 | personnel died during the campaign |
| 1,335 | Falklands veterans have died since 1982 |
| 95 | of these deaths (veterans and in-service) were attributable to suicide and open verdict deaths |

The statistics show that 7% of the deaths of Falklands veterans since the campaign were attributed to suicide, significantly less than the number of deaths during the campaign, and that, for Falklands veterans,

For deaths due to intentional self harm and events of undetermined intent (suicide and open verdict deaths) there was a 35% significant decreased risk of dying compared to the UK general population.

The trials of one British patient, Robert Lawrence, MC, were chronicled in a book co-authored by him entitled When The Fighting is Over which was later adapted into a television film. Lawrence was shot at close range by an FN rifle and lost a large percentage of brain matter, but recovered to a degree not thought possible. He remains partially paralysed in the left side of his body. After the war he became an outspoken critic of the British Army's treatment of Falklands veterans.

A similar situation afflicts the veterans on the Argentine side, many of whom have similarly suffered from psychiatric disorders, drug and alcohol abuse, and social turmoil. The current Argentine suicide toll is 454, according to an Argentine film about the suicide of a Falklands veteran.

== Social consequences ==
=== Benefits for Argentine war veterans ===
Since the end of the South Atlantic Conflict in 1982, the different levels of the national, provincial and municipal public administration of the Argentine Republic have been sanctioning a large number of norms that granted different types of decorations, recognitions, scholarships, pensions, subsidies, exemptions, credits, bonuses, supplements, retirements, priorities, social coverage, and health, housing and work plans for veterans of the Malvinas War and their families.
