= Operation Sutton =

British landings during the Falklands War

Date	21–23 May 1982
Location	San Carlos Water, Falkland Islands
Result	British victory

Belligerents
United Kingdom	Argentina

Commanders and leaders
(United Kingdom) Sandy Woodward (United Kingdom) Julian Thompson (United Kingdom) Michael Clapp	(Argentina) Ernesto Horacio Crespo (Argentina) Lt. Esteban

Strength
2 destroyers 6 frigates Amphibious Task Force; Sea Harrier CAPs	50–60 fighters 62 ground troops

Casualties and losses
1 Frigate sunken 3 killed 1 captured 2 helicopters 1 RAF Harrier GR3	6 killed 8 captured

Operation Sutton was the code name for the British landings on the shores of San Carlos Water, at Ajax Bay and Port San Carlos, near San Carlos on East Falkland.

== Landings ==
During the night, 3 Commando Brigade along with attached units of the Parachute Regiment were landed from the liner SS Canberra and the LPD HMS Fearless. There was very limited enemy resistance on the ground.

The Argentine Army force on site was a section from the 25th Infantry Regiment, named Combat Team Güemes (Spanish: Equipo de Combate Güemes), or EC Güemes, located at Fanning Head. After the British fleet was spotted at 02:50, EC Güemes opened fire with 81mm mortars and two 105mm recoilless rifles. The British warships replied with naval gunfire, and a 25-man SBS team also returned fire.

During the firefight, two British helicopters, a Sea King and a Gazelle, passed overhead, and the Argentine troops fired at them with machine guns. The Gazelle's pilot, Sergeant Andrew Evans - RM, was hit and fatally injured, but he managed to crash-land the aircraft into the sea. Evans and the other crewman, Sergeant Edward Candlish, were thrown out of the aircraft. Argentine troops shot at them for about 15 minutes as they struggled in the water, ignoring orders from their commanding officer to ceasefire.

When the firing ceased, Candlish managed to drag Evans to shore, where he died. Minutes later, a second British Gazelle helicopter, following the same route as the first, was hit by small arms fire from the Argentine platoon and shot down, killing the crew, Lt. Ken Francis and L/Cpl. Pat Giffin.

The Argentinians eventually retreated from Fanning Head, abandoning their communications equipment. At least eight members of another Argentinian platoon who fled the scene were left behind and captured by the British.

Argentine commandos of the 601 Commando Company shot down a GR.3 Harrier on a reconnaissance mission on Port Howard with a Blowpipe missile. The pilot, Flight Lieutenant Glover, bailed out, breaking his arm and collar bone in the process. He was taken prisoner by Argentine soldiers shortly afterward, and flown to a military hospital in Comodoro Rivadavia, Argentina. Six Argentine pilots were killed during the operation.

The invasion, part of the overall Operation Corporate, sparked a strong response from the Argentine Air Force and Argentine Naval Aviation, and led to the Battle of San Carlos.
