= Rick Jolly =

Medical officer in British navy

- Born: 29 October 1946; British Hong Kong
- Died: 13 January 2018 (aged 71); Torpoint, Cornwall
- Military career
- Allegiance: United Kingdom
- Branch: Royal Navy
- Service years: 1972—1996
- Rank: Surgeon Captain
- Nickname: "The Doc"
- Unit: Commando Logistic Regiment Medical Squadron
- Conflicts: Falklands War (Ajax Bay)
- Awards: OBE; Oficial Orden de Mayo (Argentina)
- Other work: The Red & Green Life Machine; Jackspeak; In Confidence

Surgeon-Captain Richard Tadeusz Jolly OBE (29 October 1946 – 13 January 2018) was a Royal Navy medical officer who served in the 1982 Falklands War and was later decorated by both the British and Argentine governments for his distinguished conduct during the conflict. He went on to practise and give lectures to medical establishments on his experiences. He was a co-founder, with Denzil Connick, of the South Atlantic Medal Association formed in 1997. He was also the only person to be decorated by both sides for his work in the Falklands War.

== Background ==
Jolly was educated at Stonyhurst College and subsequently studied medicine at St Bartholomew's Hospital Medical College (now Barts and The London School of Medicine and Dentistry) in London, and qualified as a physician in 1969. While working as a houseman, a senior colleague suggested he join the Royal Naval Reserve as a Royal Navy doctor.

== Career ==
He became Medical Officer to 42 Commando RM, who were deployed in Belfast along with men of the 3rd Battalion, Parachute Regiment, with whom he built a strong friendship.

In 24 years of service, he completed two tours with the Fleet Air Arm as a Fleet Surgeon, Medical Officer recruitment/Officer training in the Dartmouth Training Ship HMS Bristol, and at the Britannia Royal Naval College.

=== Falklands War ===
As Officer Commanding Medical Squadron of the Commando Logistic Regiment Royal Marines, Jolly was Senior Medical Officer of 3 Commando Brigade RM and commanded the field hospital at Ajax Bay known as the "Red and Green Life Machine"

The facilities at Ajax Bay were set up in an old refrigeration plant situated next to an ammunition dump, as those were the only roofed buildings available of any size fit for purpose. Because its position was close to legitimate military targets, Brigadier Julian Thompson ordered they were not to paint a Red Cross on the building's roof to highlight the hospital, due to the terms of the Geneva Convention. The conditions in the field hospital were poor and despite the dirt, poor lighting, air attacks and the presence of two unexploded bombs, only three of the 580 British soldiers and marines wounded in action were to die of their wounds and none while under the care of Jolly.

=== Post-war ===
Before visiting Argentina in 1998, Jolly had sent ahead a list of Argentine casualties and asked the authorities there what had become of them. As a result, the Argentine Foreign Ministry discovered the truth about the battlefield medical care of their wounded by the British during the conflict and invited over 50 of them to a ceremony in Buenos Aires, where Jolly was appointed as an Oficial (Officer) in the Order of May in recognition of his outstanding work in saving the lives of many wounded Argentine soldiers and airmen.

As it was a foreign decoration, Jolly had to write to the Queen for permission to wear his Order of May award with his other medals, to which she personally responded by authorising him to wear the award "on all occasions" on behalf of the 300 British Naval, Royal Marines and Army medics involved in the war. The Argentine award made Jolly the only serviceman to have been decorated by both sides after the conflict.

Jolly was interviewed in the TV documentary Falklands Combat Medics, which concentrated primarily on the work and role played by the field hospital based at Ajax Bay and he campaigned for the recognition of posttraumatic stress disorder for all Falkland veterans in aid of the South Atlantic Medal Association.

=== Death ===
Jolly died on 13 January 2018 from heart condition complications and is survived by his wife, Susie (née Matthews), a former children's nurse, whom he married in 1970. Their son, James, predeceased him aged 17.

== Honours and awards ==
- Order of the British Empire (OBE) – appointed in the 1983 South Atlantic Honours List for leadership and gallantry during the Falklands conflict
- General Service Medal (1962) with Northern Ireland clasp – awarded for service in Northern Ireland with 42 Commando Royal Marines
- South Atlantic Medal with rosette – for service during the Falklands War, treating British and Argentine wounded under combat conditions
- Order of May (Military Merit) (Officer) (Note: Spanish: Orden de Mayo (Al Mérito Militar) - Oficial) (Argentina) – awarded in 1999 by President Carlos Menem for lifesaving medical care to Argentine personnel

== Books ==
Jolly's first book, For Campaign Service, detailed the experience of soldiers and Royal Marines who served in Northern Ireland. The book took its title and cover image from the General Service Medal issued to UK military. He also wrote the book The Red and Green Life Machine, about his experiences in the Falklands War, and Jackspeak: A Guide to British Naval Slang and Usage.
