= Tutshill Wood =

Woodland in Devon, England

Coordinates: 51°05′49″N 4°03′33″W

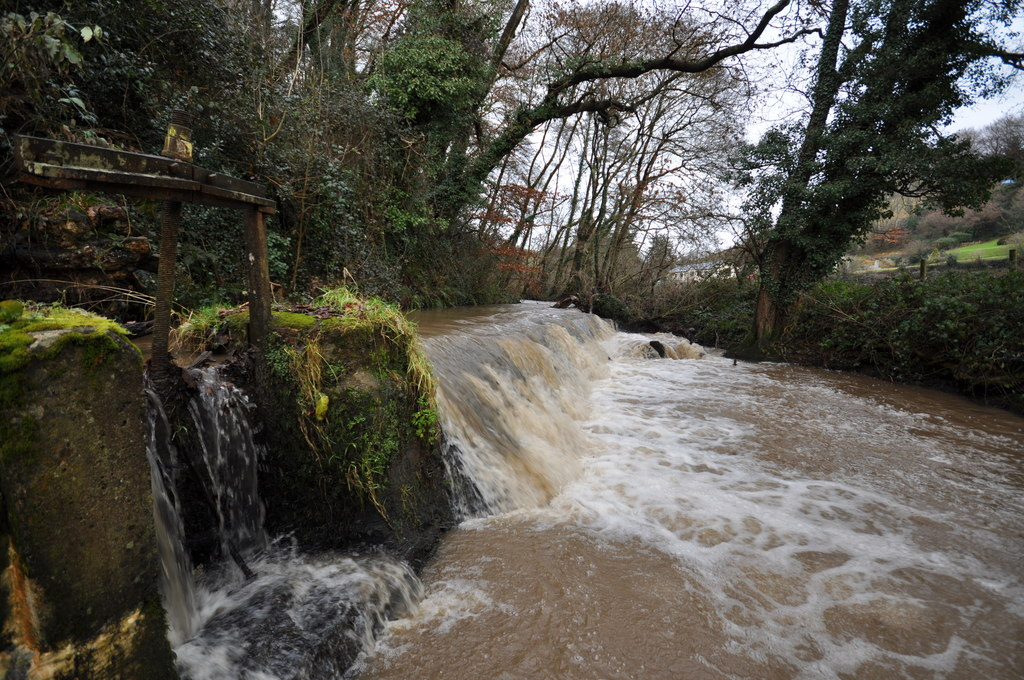
- A weir and sluice gate on Bradiford Water in Tutshill Wood

- Location within Devon
- OS grid reference: SS559351
- Civil parish: Pilton West
- District: North Devon
- Shire county: Devon
- Region: South West
- Country: England
- Sovereign state: United Kingdom
- Police: Devon and Cornwall
- Fire: Devon and Somerset
- Ambulance: South Western

Tutshill Wood is a wood in Devon, England, situated on the northern edge of Barnstaple, at the east end of a flat-topped ridge that runs from west to east along the north bank of the River Taw, from Heanton Punchardon. (The former name of the ridge itself survives today in the name of the military base RM Chivenor.) The wood stands on Devonian siltstones and mudstones. At its highest point it stands around 95m above sea level, facing south-east across a mostly level flood-plain. Through the wood runs Bradiford Water.

== Etymology ==
The name is first attested in 1533-38 as Tuttyshall in Pilton, in 1544 as Tyttishill and Titeshell, and in 1545 as Tyttyshill. The second element of the name is thought to be the word 'hill'.

== Ecology ==
According to J. J. Day, the wood is noted as habitat for hazel dormice, pearl-bordered fritillary, and small pearl-bordered fritillary. In addition,

the wood consists largely of a stand of Sessile Oak Quercus petraea with Ash Fraxinus excelsior as a codominant. Hazel Corylus avellana, Holly Ilex aquifolium and occasional Hawthorn Crataegus monogyna occur in the understorey, with some Honeysuckle Lonicera periclymenum. The ground flora includes Primrose Primula vulgaris, Wood Avens Geum urbanum, Wood Anemone Anemone nemorosa and Dog's Mercury Mercurialis perennis. Some areas of the wood have been invaded by Sycamore Acer pseudoplatanus and Beech Fagus sylvatica. Here Bramble Rubus fruticosus and Ivy Hedera helix are abundant, with frequent Great Woodrush Luzula sylvatica and Wood Sage Teucrium scorodonia. Alder Alnus glutinosa occurs as individual trees along the watercourses, and as a stand with Sallow Salix cinerea where a tributary stream enters the site to the north.

Bird species inhabiting the wood include

Buzzard Buteo buteo, Sparrowhawk Accipiter nisus, all three British species of Woodpecker, Tawny Owl Strix aluco, Little Owl Athene noctua, Spotted Flycatcher Muscicapa striata and Nuthatch Sitta europaea. Several Warblers such as Whitethroat Sylvia communis and Garden Warbler S. borin also breed here. Dipper Cinclus cinclus, Grey Wagtail Motacilla cinerea, Kingfisher Alcedo atthis and Water Rail Rallus aquaticus nest near the watercourses.
