= 24 Commando Royal Engineers =

Unit of the British Army's Royal Engineers

- Country: United Kingdom
- Allegiance: United Kingdom
- Branch: British Army
- Type: Royal Engineers
- Role: Combat Engineer
- Size: 4 squadrons 492 personnel
- Part of: UK Commando Force
- Garrison/HQ: RM Chivenor
- Nickname: Commando Sappers

24 Commando Royal Engineers is a unit of the British Army's Royal Engineers supporting UK Commando Force.

== History ==
The regiment, which was formed in April 2008, is one of two British Army units attached to 3 Commando Brigade, Royal Marines, the other being 29 Commando Regiment Royal Artillery. It was announced on 4 July 2012 that 24 Commando Engineer Regiment was to disband under Army 2020. Members of the unit were to be dispersed to other British Army units and 59 Independent Commando Squadron would be re-formed to replace it. In a contrasting written statement on 10 April 2014, the Minister for Defence Mark Francois, stated that this withdrawal would not take place. The unit was to be retained but reduced in size.

In August 2014 it was agreed that 131 Independent Squadron would re-subordinate from 3 Commando Brigade to become part of 24 Commando Royal Engineers. This change took place on 2 October 2015, making the regiment a hybrid Regular/Reserve unit, like its counterpart in 16 Air Assault Brigade, 23 Parachute Engineer Regiment.

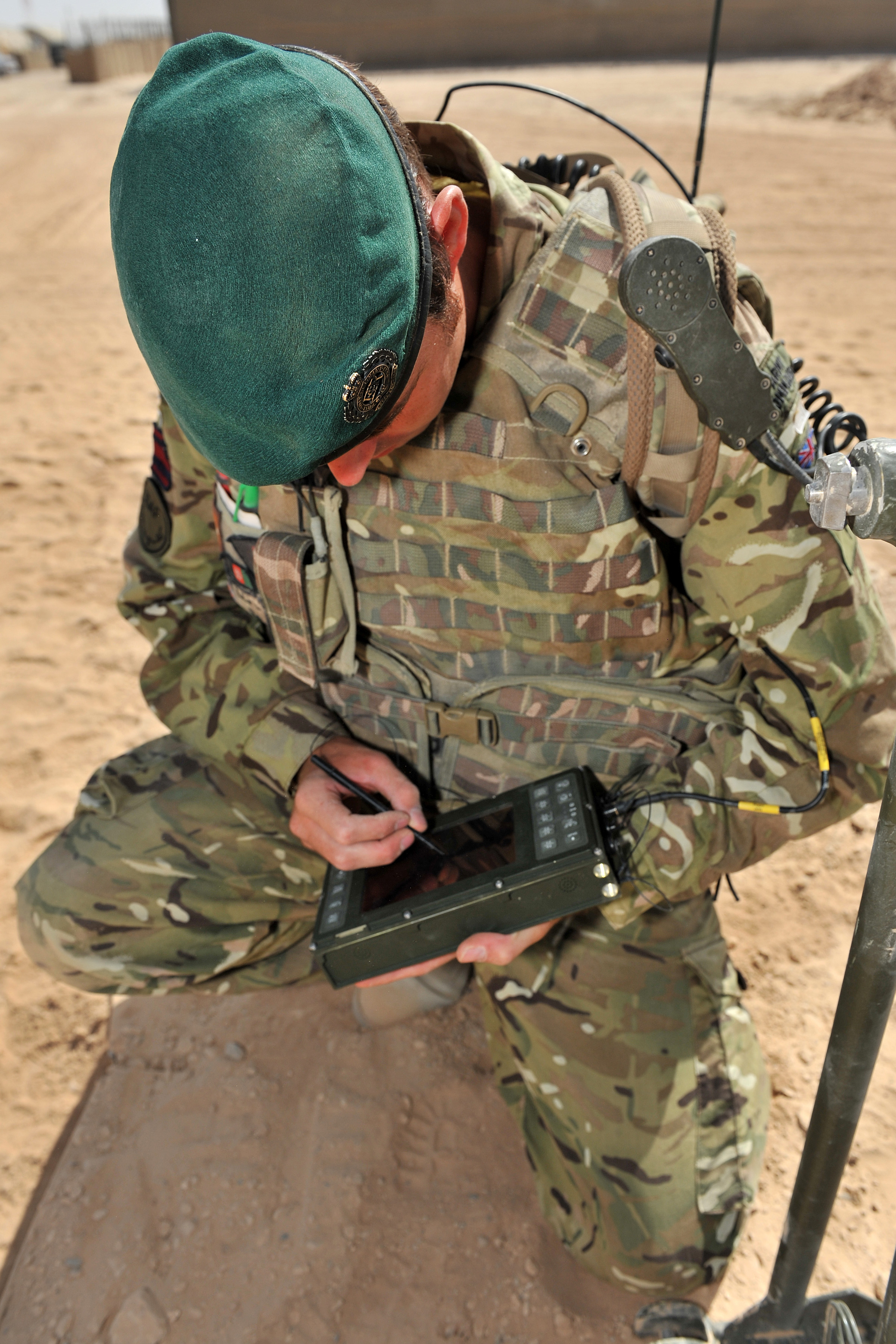
A soldier of 24 Commando Engineer Regiment in Afghanistan, 2011.

== Structure ==
The regimental structure is as follows:

=== 56 Commando Headquarters and Support Squadron ===
56 Commando Squadron was formed in 1947 as part of 1 Armoured Division Engineer Regiment. It is now the Headquarters and Support Squadron.

=== 54 Commando Squadron Royal Engineers ===
54 Commando Squadron Royal Engineers was originally formed in 1950. In 2013 it became the second close support commando squadron of the unit, mirroring the structure of 59 Commando Squadron. It is now the high-readiness commando engineer squadron.

=== 59 Commando Squadron Royal Engineers ===
59 Independent Commando Squadron Royal Engineers represented the Commando-trained, regular unit of the Corps until the formation of 24 Regiment in 2008. Soldiers were drawn from the regular units of the British Army's Corps of Royal Engineers. The squadron remains based at RMB Chivenor. It is now the Naval Support Squadron.

=== 131 Commando Squadron Royal Engineers ===
131 Commando Squadron Royal Engineers was the Army Reserve unit affiliated to 3 Commando Brigade until 1 October 2015. The squadron formally became a full part of 24 Commando Royal Engineers on 2 October 2015.

== The Commando course ==
All individuals who volunteer to join the regiment have the opportunity to complete the thirteen-week All Arms Commando Course, after receiving pre-course coaching to develop their strength and endurance. Progressive in nature, this pre-course conditioning package focuses upon developing the individual to undertake the arduous activities of the Commando course.

=== The Green Beret ===
The coveted Green Beret, the distinctive hallmark of Commando trained troops, is worn by the regiment, recognising those who have completed the grueling and physically demanding tests of endurance, whilst displaying the Commando spirit. On passing the Commando course, other ranks (ORs) wear the Commando Green Beret with a blackened Royal Engineers cap-badge, whilst officers wear the officers' flaming grenade cap-badge with a green base material, sewn onto the Commando Green Beret.

=== Other uniform emblems ===
Both officers and ORs wear the Army Commando shoulder titles on each sleeve, which have replaced the All-Arms Commando badge (a small red dagger on a dark blue background) on the upper left sleeve in No. 8 Temperate Combat Dress, (PCS-CU) uniform only. All other orders of dress retain the All-Arms Commando badge. The Royal Engineers stable belt is differentiated by a Commando Dagger emblem on the clasp. Additionally, the 3 Commando Brigade RM Tactical Recognition Flash, (TRF) a black Commando Dagger on an olive green square, is worn on the left arm of shirt and combat jacket.
