= Ajax Bay =

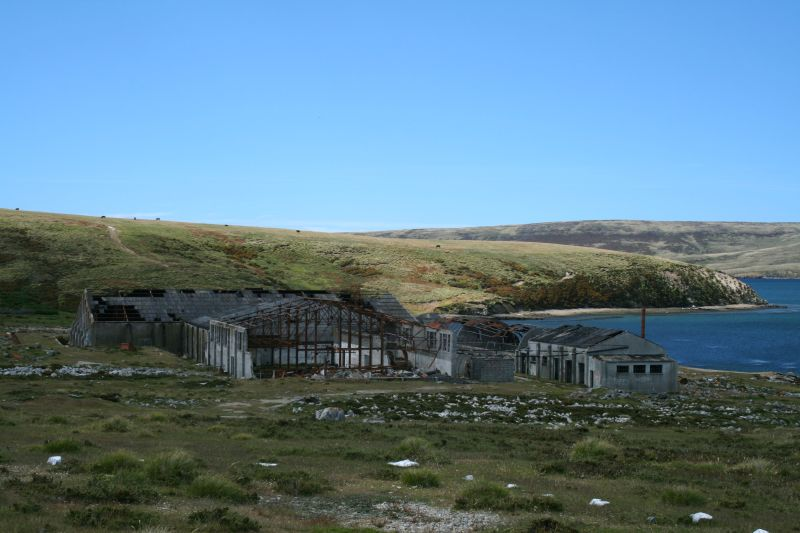
- Some of the remaining buildings in 2008

- Location in the Falkland Islands
- Coordinates: 51°33′56″S 59°4′48″W
- Country: United Kingdom
- British Overseas Territory: Falkland Islands
- Region: East Falkland

Ajax Bay is an abandoned former refrigeration plant and wartime landing point on the north-west coast of East Falkland in the Falkland Islands, facing San Carlos Water a few miles from Port San Carlos. It was previously a settlement, surrounding the plant, which was developed by the Colonial Development Corporation in the 1950s, also responsible for developing Port Albemarle. It was supposed to freeze Falkland mutton, but this was found to be economically unviable. Many of the pre-fabricated houses were moved to Stanley.

== History ==
During the Falklands War, the first British bridgehead was established on San Carlos Water on 21 May 1982. Ajax Bay was one of three landing points, and codenamed "Red Beach" as part of Operation Sutton. The next day, the refrigeration plant became a field hospital and maintenance area, the Advanced Surgical Centre. It was run by Surgeon Commander Rick Jolly and operated until 9 June. It became known as the "Red and Green Life Machine", as the hospital provided surgical care to British and Argentine casualties alike, treating approximately 580 wounded with remarkably no fatalities in its care. It operated under constant air attack until 9 June 1982.

The site also served as a depot for Argentine prisoners of war and even had unexploded bombs lodged in its roof during bombing raids. Following the conflict, the hospital was decommissioned, and Ajax Bay returned to its derelict, ruinous state.

A memorial plaque to the Royal Marines Commando Logistic Regiment stands nearby, commemorating those killed and injured during a 1982 bombing raid.

== Ajax Bay gallery ==
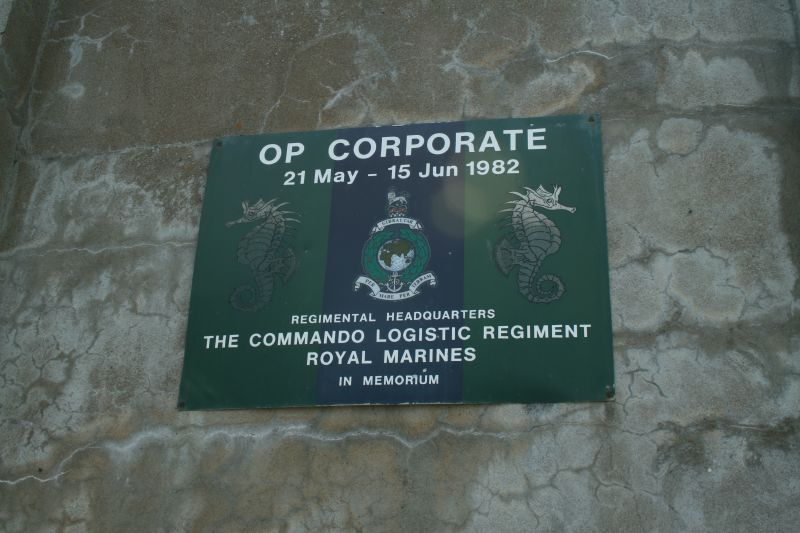
Memorial plaque to the British Cdo Log Regt RM.

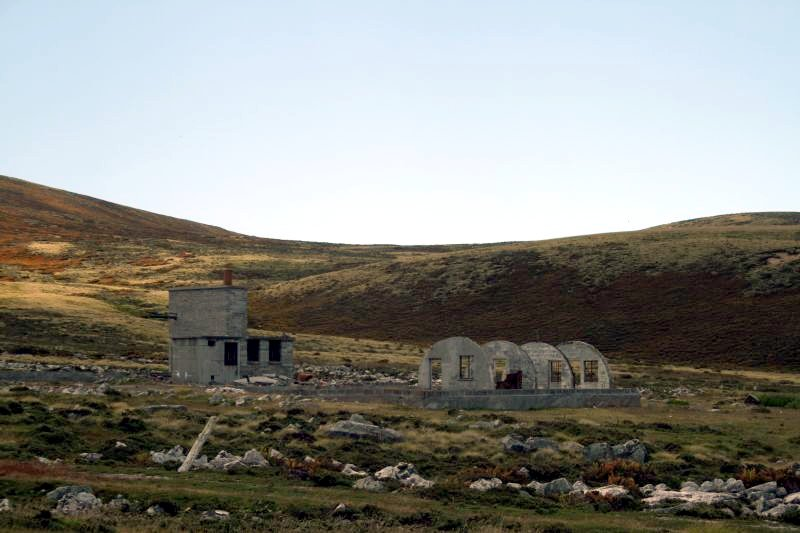
Some of the remaining buildings of the freezer plant.

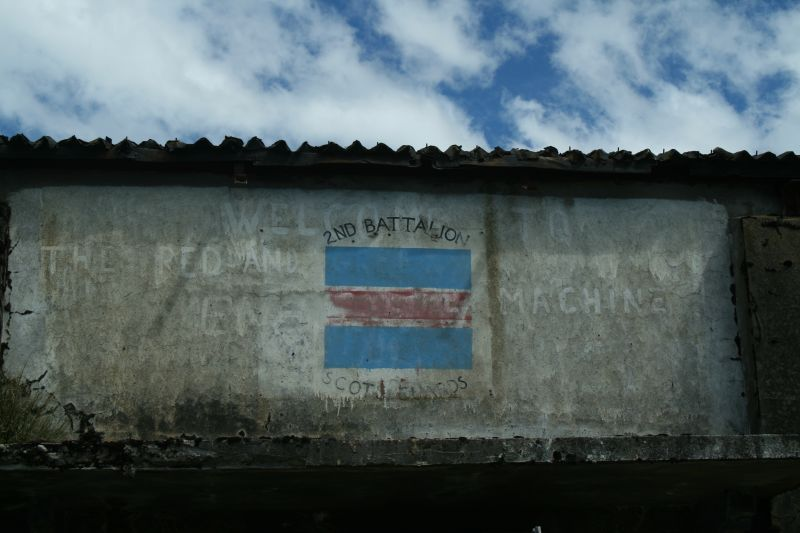
Back of the building showing war era graffiti

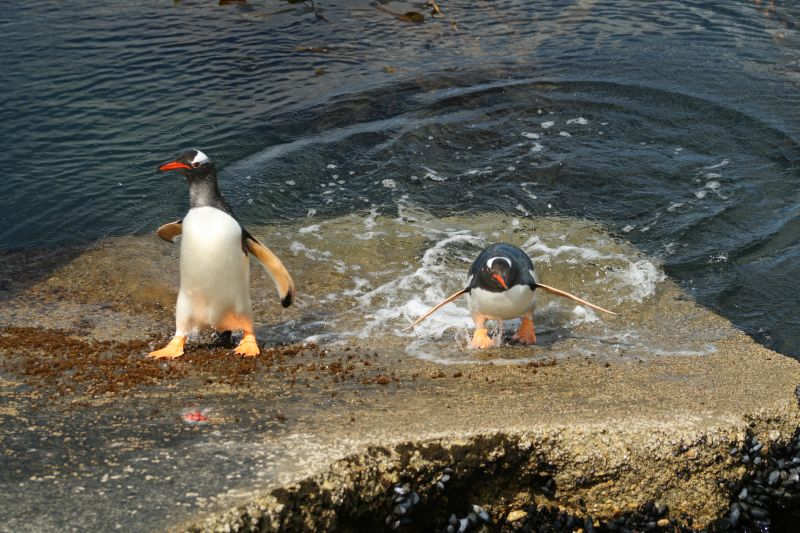
Gentoo penguins, the current residents of Ajax Bay

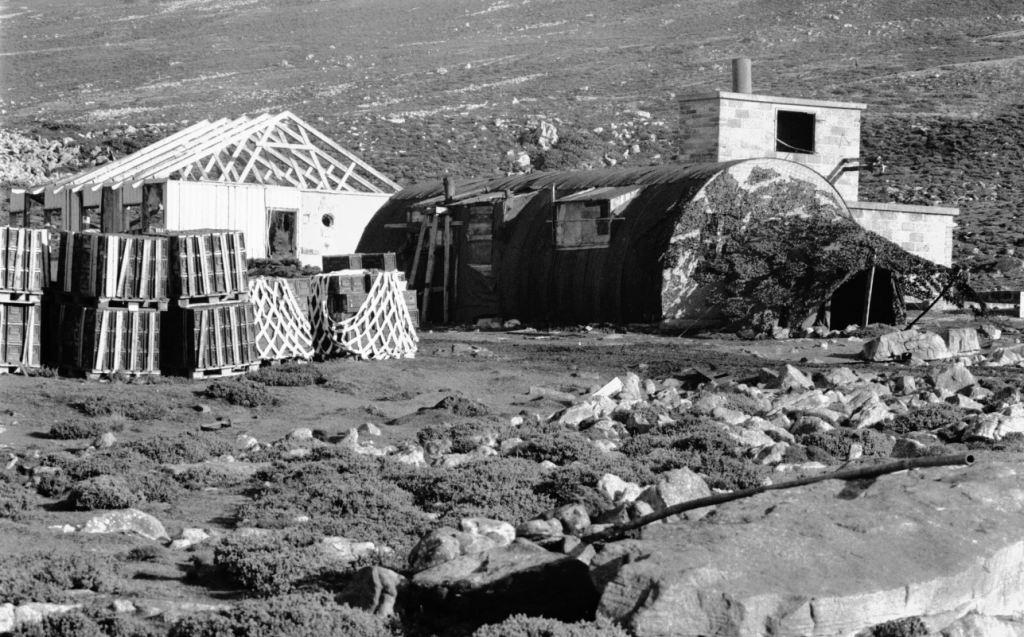
Ajax Bay (Red Beach) 1982.
