= 48 Commando Support Group =

Logistic regiment of the Royal Marines

48 Commando Support Group Royal Marines
- Cap Badge of the Royal Marines
- Active: 1972–present
- Country: United Kingdom
- Branch: Royal Navy; British Army; Royal Air Force; Royal Marines
- Type: Commando
- Size: Regiment; 780 personnel
- Part of: UK Commando Force
- Garrison/HQ: RMB Chivenor
- Engagements: Falklands War; Operation Telic; Operation Herrick 5 Operation Herrick 9 Operation Herrick 14

48 Commando Support Group Royal Marines, formerly known as the Commando Logistic Regiment (CLR), provides second line Combat Service Support to United Kingdom Commando Force (UKCF).

== History ==
Originally formed as the Commando Logistic Regiment (CLR) in 1972, the unit name changed to 48 Commando Support Group Royal Marines on 1 August 2026.

== Organisation ==
Based at RM Chivenor in North Devon, the Commando Logistic Regiment role is to ensure the re-supply of ammunition, water, fuel and food, known as "combat supplies" to the ground forces, and provide specialist services to sustain the brigade's operations. The regiment is divided into squadrons:

- Headquarters and training Squadron (responsible for command and control)
- Commando Forces Support Squadron
- Delta Squadron
- Workshop Squadron
- Victor Squadron
- Medical squadron
- Viking Squadron
- 383 Commando Petroleum Troop

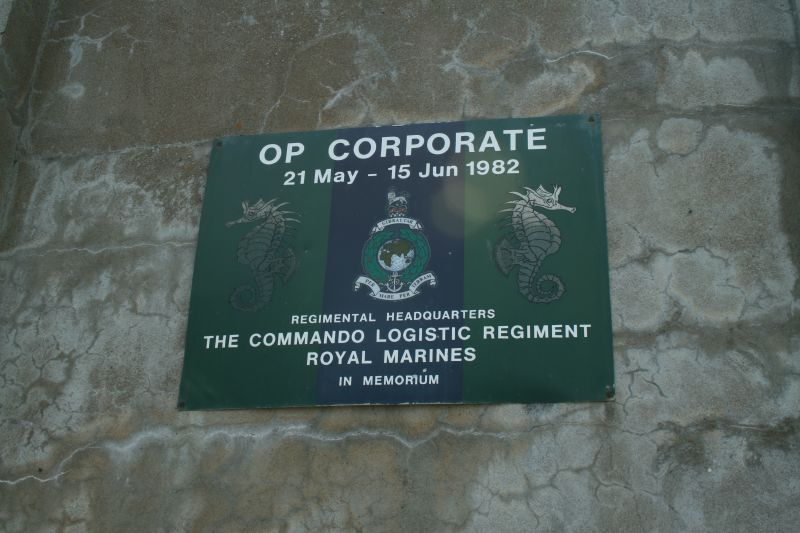
Memorial plaque to the Commando Logistic Regiment at Ajax Bay

== See also ==
- UK Commando Force
- Royal Marines
