= Port San Carlos =

Port in East Falkland, Falkland Islands

Coordinates: 51°30′10″S 58°59′12″W

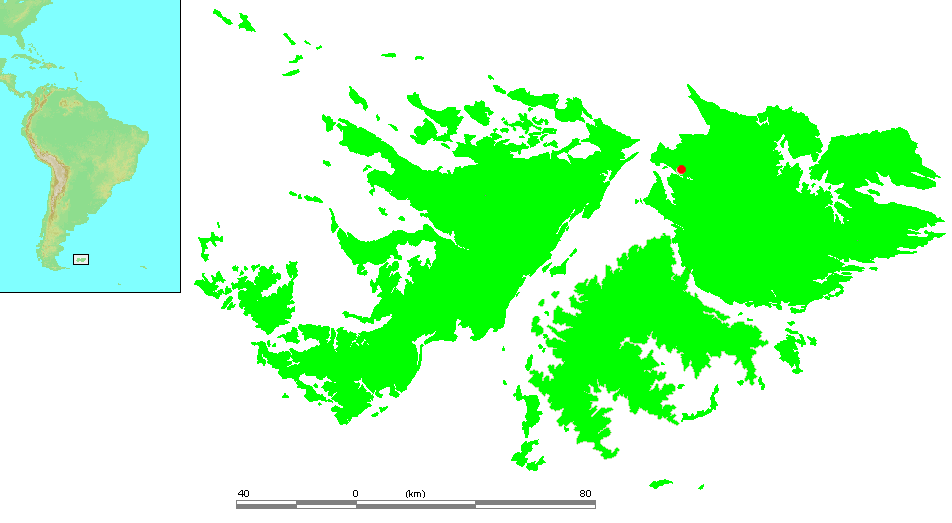
Location of Port San Carlos.

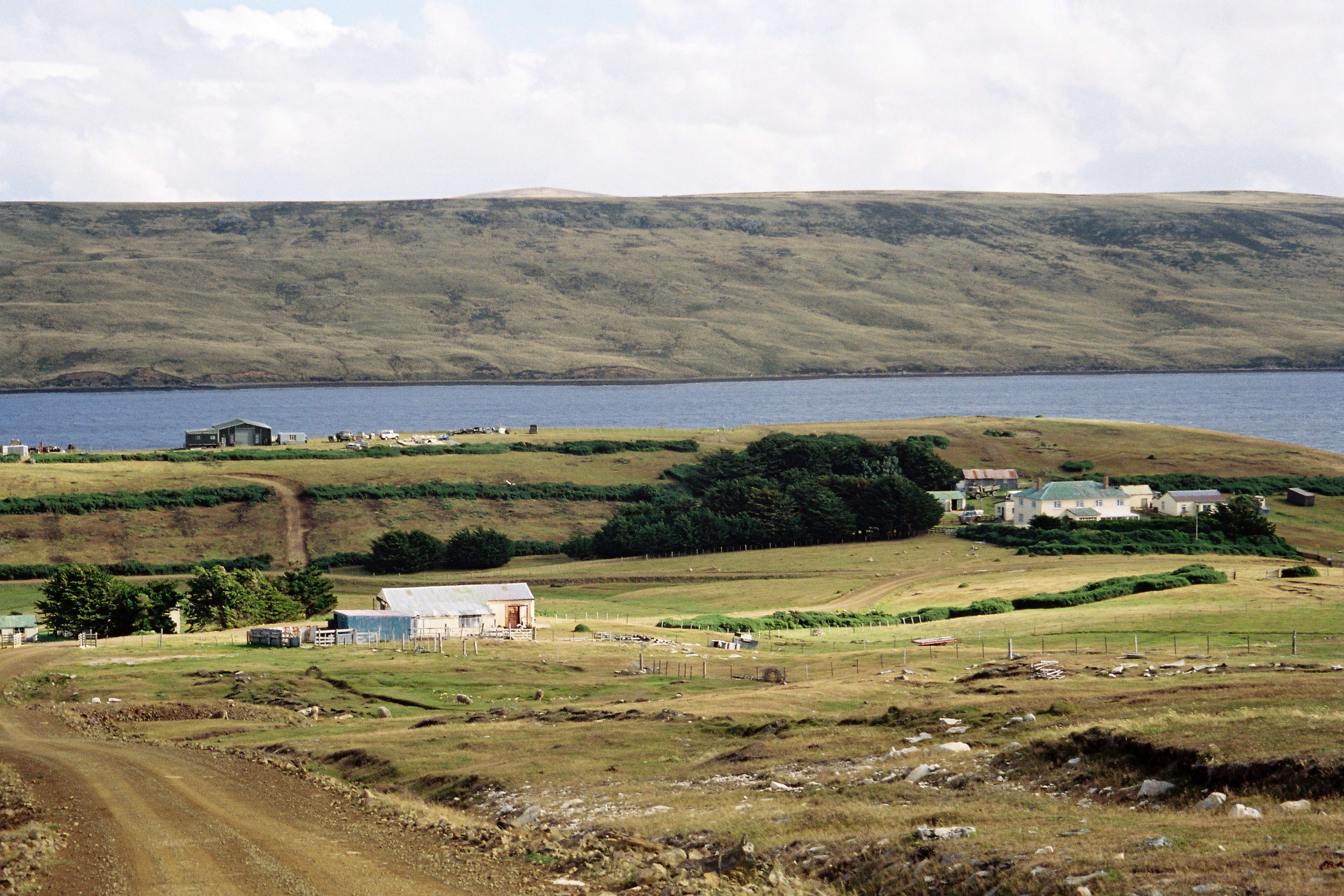
Port San Carlos

Port San Carlos is located on the northern bank of the inlet known as Port San Carlos, off San Carlos Water on the Western coast of East Falkland, in the Falkland Islands. William Cameron founded a settlement at Port San Carlos in 1870 when it was called San Carlos North. However, the inlet where Port San Carlos is was used as far back as the 1830s by William Horton Smyley for hunting seals. It is sometimes nicknamed "KC" after former owner Keith Cameron.

The port takes its name from the ship San Carlos which visited in 1768.

It is north of its namesake San Carlos around the headland or across the body of water San Carlos Water. The settlement has a road from Port Stanley, but to drive to San carlos requires the traveller to retrace their steps almost all the way to Port Stanley. By road, the settlement is 115 kilometres (71 mi) west of Stanley (although it is only 80 kilometres (50 mi) as the crow flies) and the journey by vehicle takes between two and three hours.

== History ==
It is most noted for being the first landing place of British forces during the 1982 Falklands War; it was codenamed "Green Beach", and was part of Operation Sutton. All of the landing sites were given colour-coded names according to their military significance. Little remains of the British landings or the Argentine defences in the area, though the airstrip just outside Port San Carlos was used by the Royal Navy No. 847 Squadron Wessex helicopters, and Harrier aircraft as a refuelling point during the closing stages of the Falklands Conflict.
