= San Carlos, Falkland Islands =

Settlement on East Falkland

Coordinates: 51.575°S 59.0333°W

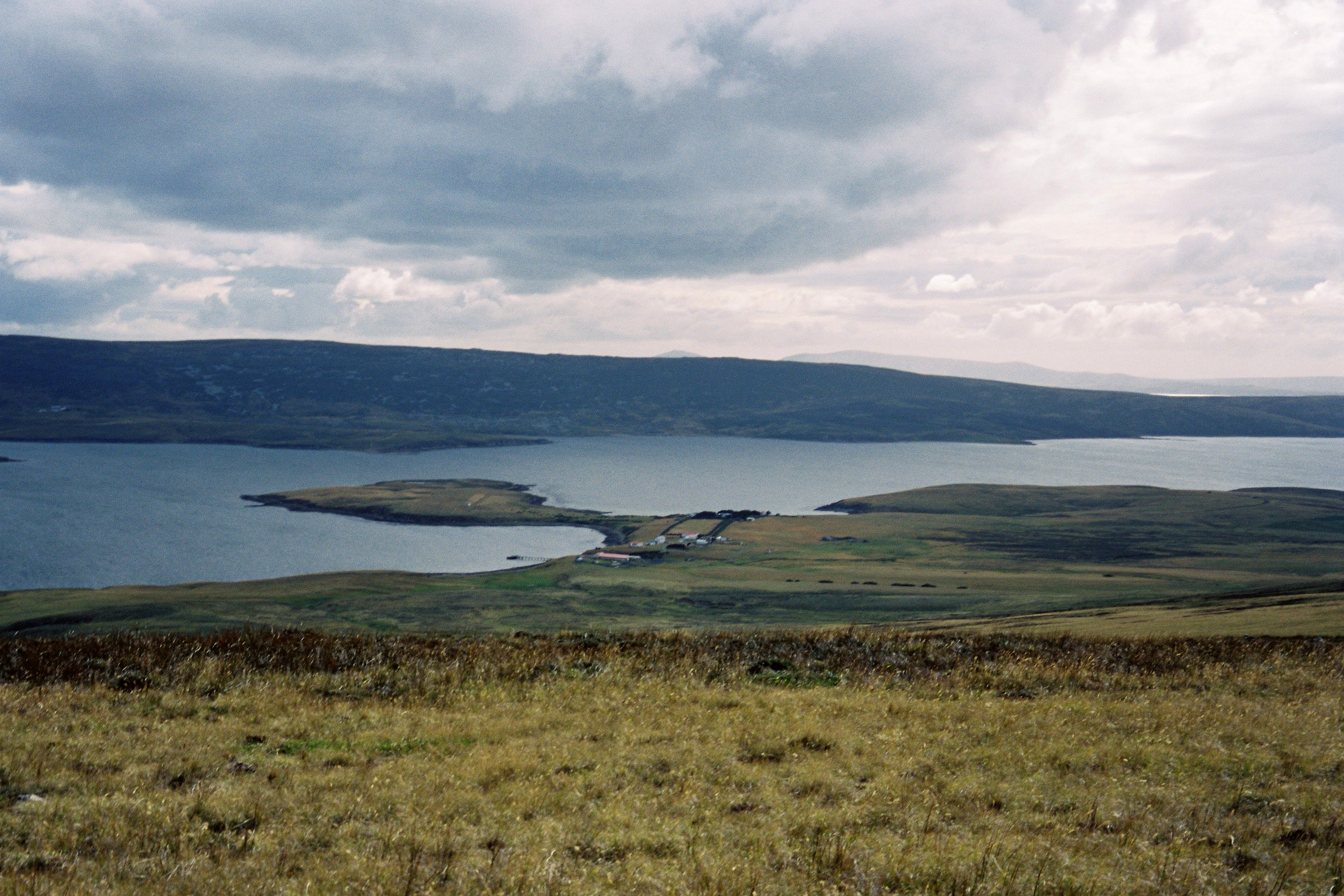
San Carlos settlement

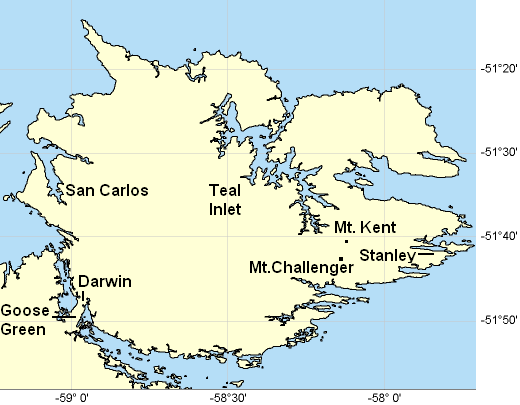
San Carlos and north East Falkland

San Carlos is a settlement in northwestern East Falkland, lying south of Port San Carlos on San Carlos Water. It is sometimes nicknamed "JB" after a former owner, Jack Bonner. The settlement consists of a number of properties including a dwelling with a small cafe which also provides craft facilities. As noted in the history section, there is a small museum that pays homage to the Falklands Conflict as well as local nature and culture.

== History ==
The settlement is named after the ship San Carlos, which visited in May 1768. San Carlos grew in the early twentieth century around a factory which froze sheep carcasses.

In 1982 San Carlos was the main British Army bridgehead during the Falklands War, when it was codenamed "Blue Beach".

A museum and the Blue Beach Military Cemetery at San Carlos commemorate that period.

== See also ==
- San Carlos River (Falkland Islands)
