= RM Chivenor =

Military base in Devon, England

RMB Chivenor
- Near Braunton, Devon in England
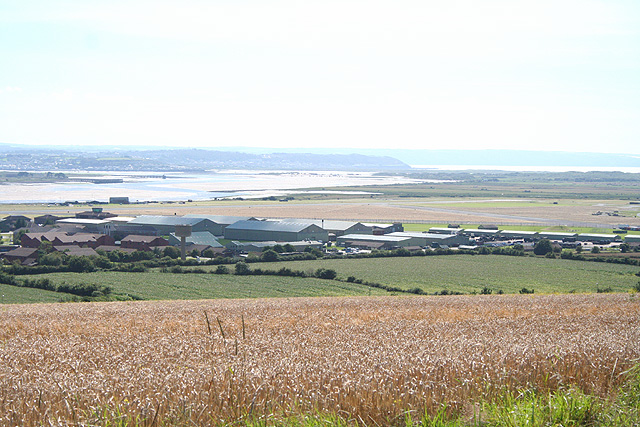
- View looking south over RMB Chivenor

- Badge of the Royal Marines

Site information
- Type: Royal Marines Base
- Owner: Ministry of Defence
- Operator: Royal Navy
- Controlled by: Royal Marines
- Condition: Operational
- Website: RM Chivenor - Royal Navy

Location
- Location in Devon RMB Chivenor (the United Kingdom)
- Coordinates: 51°05′14″N 004°09′01″W
- Area: 222 hectares

Site history
- Built: 1940
- In use: 1940–1995 (Royal Air Force); 1995 – present (Royal Marines)

Garrison information
- Current commander: Lt Col R. Alderson RM
- Occupants: Commando Logistic Regiment; 24 Commando Regiment Royal Engineers; Volunteer Cadet Corps

Royal Marines Barracks Chivenor is a British military base used primarily by UK Commando Force. It is situated on the northern shore of the River Taw estuary, adjacent to the South West Coast Path, on the north coast of Devon, England. The nearest towns are Barnstaple and Braunton.

Originally a civil airfield opened in the 1930s, the site was taken over by the Royal Air Force (RAF) and was operational between May 1940 and 1995 when it was transferred to the Royal Marines.

== Etymology ==
The name Chivenor is first attested in 1285, as Chivenore. This is thought to originate in Old English as a personal name, Cifa, in its genitive form Cifan, combined with the Old English word ōra ('flat-topped ridge'). Thus the name once meant 'Cifa's flat-topped ridge'. The ridge in question runs from west to east along the north bank of the River Taw, from Heanton Punchardon to Tutshill Wood on the northern fringe of Barnstaple. Like Heanton Punchardon, RM Chivenor lies at the west end of the ridge.

== History ==
=== RAF Chivenor ===
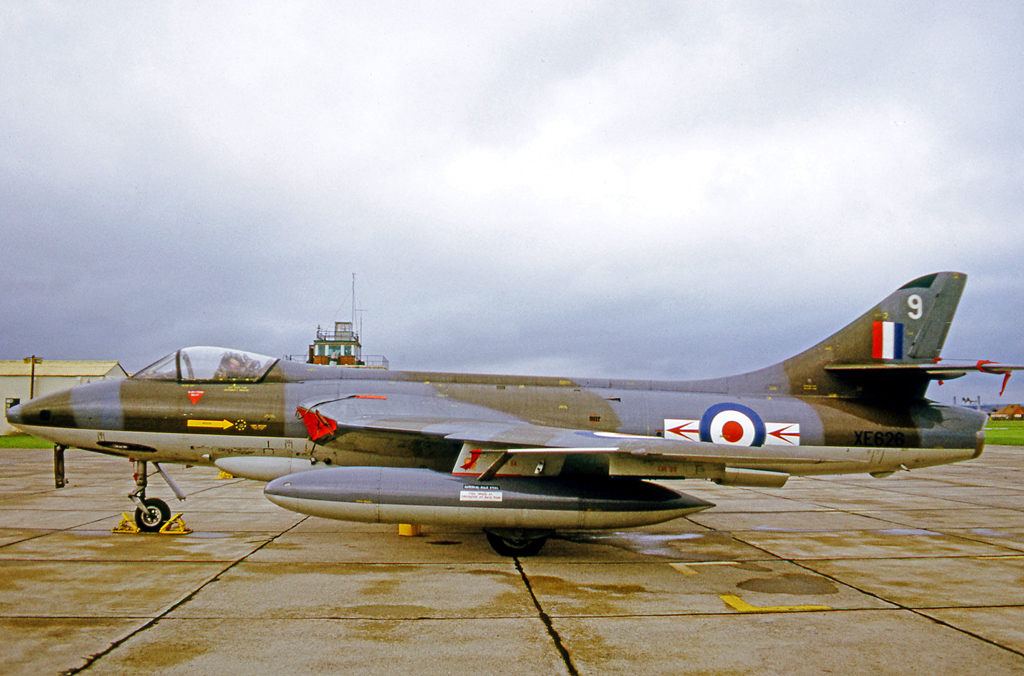
Hawker Hunter FR.10 of 79 Squadron, 229 OCU, based at RAF Chivenor, in 1971

In the 1930s, a civil airfield was opened on or near the site of Chivenor farm. In February 1940 the Air Ministry took the site over, constructing an aerodrome in May 1940 for use as an RAF Coastal Command Station. Known as RAF Chivenor, the station opened on 25 October 1940 within No. 17 Group, Coastal Command. Initially, two units were based there initially: No. 3 (Coastal) Operational Training Unit RAF and No. 252 Squadron RAF, both operating Bristol Beaufighters, Bristol Blenheims and Bristol Beauforts.

After the Second World War, the station was largely used for training, particularly weapons training. During the 1950s and 1960s, No. 229 Operational Conversion Unit RAF (229 OCU) used Hawker Hunter aircraft for training. In 1974 229 OCU left for RAF Brawdy (where it was renamed as the Tactical Weapons Unit), with Chivenor placed into "care and maintenance" status for rebuilding, though No. 624 Volunteer Gliding Squadron (624 VGS) continued to fly from there.

The RAF returned in 1981, with 2 Tactical Weapons Unit (2 TWU) and their BAE Hawks, moving in from RAF Lossiemouth. In 1992 2 TWU was renamed as 7 FTS before leaving in 1994 to merge with 4 FTS at RAF Valley, and the airfield was handed over to the RM.

=== Transfer to Royal Marines ===
From 1 October 1995 onwards, the Royal Marines took control of the base, it being renamed Royal Marines Base Chivenor (RMB Chivenor). It became home to the Commando Logistics Regiment, Royal Marines and 59 Independent Commando Squadron Royal Engineers, now 24 Commando Regiment Royal Engineers.

The airfield remained an operational airfield, used by the Royal Navy, Royal Marines and RAF Search and Rescue Force (No. 22 Squadron RAF) as well as No. 624 Volunteer Gliding Squadron RAF (624 VGS) operating Grob Vigilant T1 motor gliders, providing flights for the Air Training Corps and Combined Cadet Force.

=== Proposed closure ===
A Better Defence Estate, published in November 2016, indicated that the Ministry of Defence would dispose of RMB Chivenor by 2027. However, following a concerted campaign to keep the base open, the Ministry of Defence announced in February 2019 that the base would remain open.

== Based units ==
Notable units based at RMB Chivenor.

=== Royal Navy ===
Royal Marines (UK Commando Force)

- Commando Logistic Regiment
  - Headquarters Squadron
  - Equipment Support Squadron
  - Landing Force Support Squadron
  - Logistic Support Squadron
  - Medical Squadron
  - Viking Squadron

=== British Army ===
Royal Engineers (UK Commando Force)

- 24 Commando Regiment
  - 56 Commando Headquarters and Support Squadron
  - 54 Commando Engineer Squadron
  - 59 Commando Engineer Squadron
  - 131 Commando Engineer Squadron
  - 24 REME Workshop

=== Cadets ===
In December 2020 the Volunteer Cadet Corps started a unit of Royal Marines Cadets at RMB Chivenor. Due to COVID-19, face to face activities were put on hold but as of October 2021 the first cadets and adult volunteers will be starting training on site.

== Role and operations ==
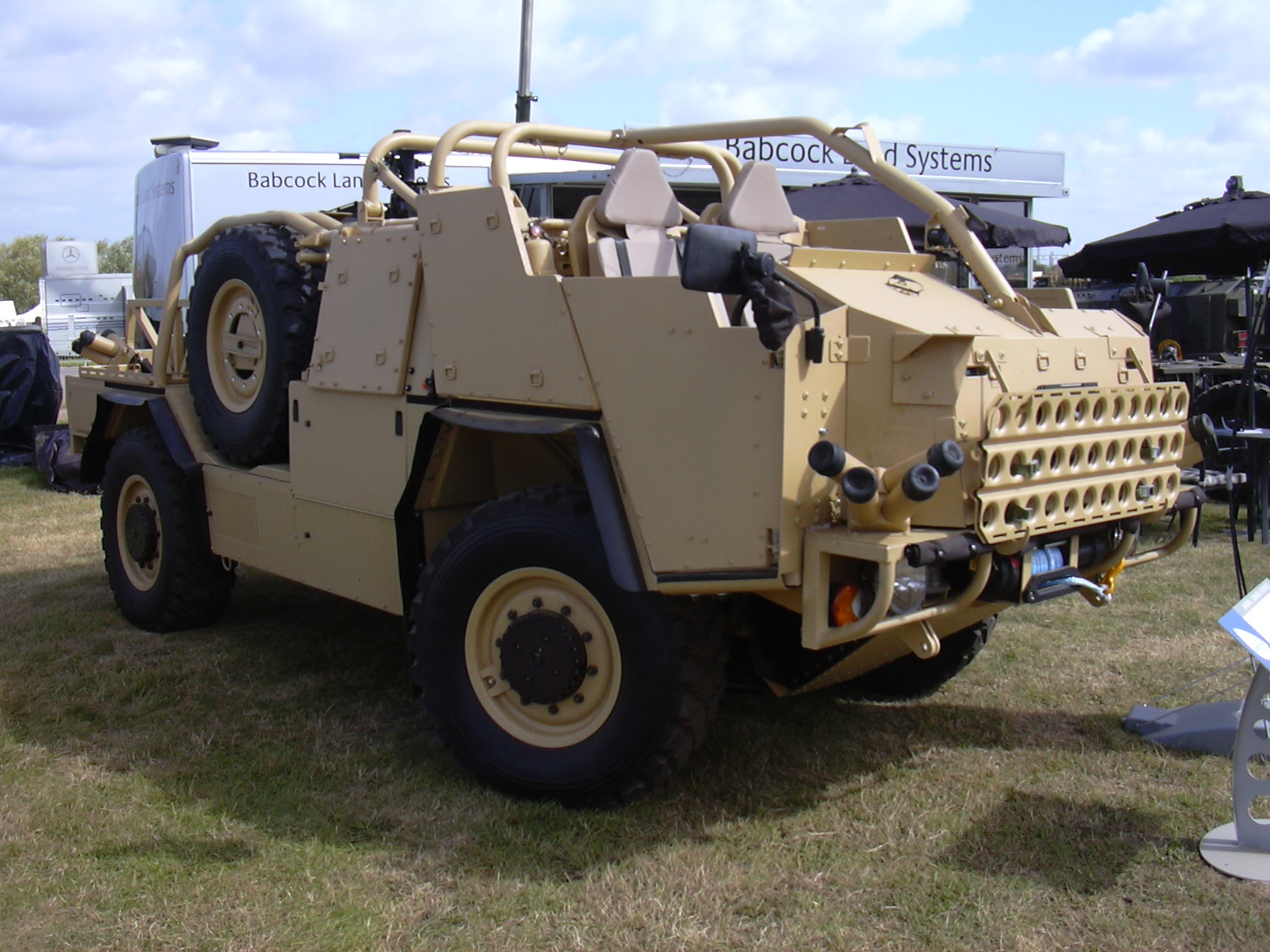
A Jackal

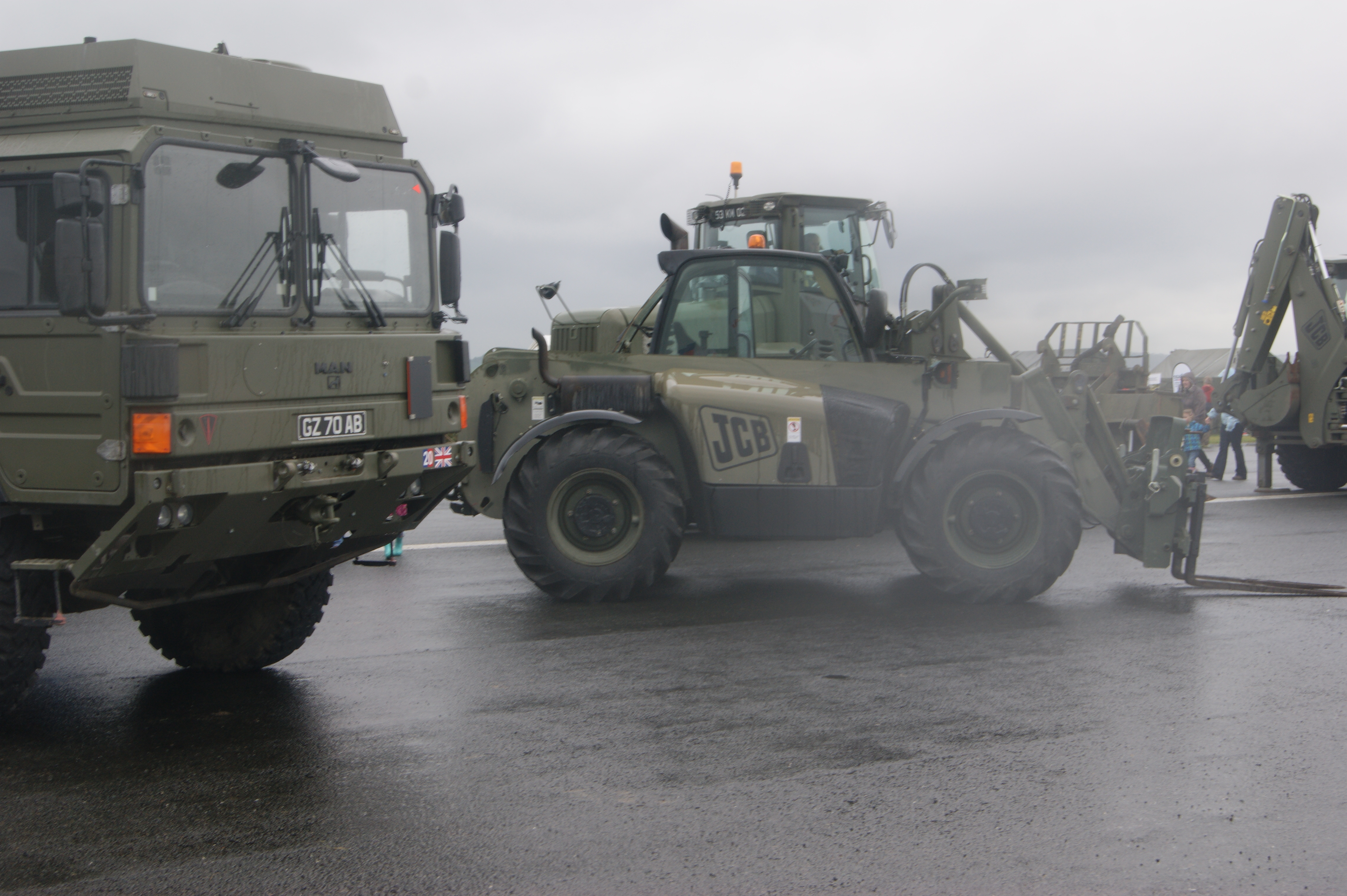
Military vehicles use by 24 Commando Engineer Regiment, on display at RMB Chivenor at an open day

=== Commando Logistic Regiment ===
The Commando Logistic Regiment's role is to ensure the re-supply of ammunition, water, fuel and food, known as "combat supplies" to the ground forces, and to provide first-line medical care to any service person or civilian. It also provides specialist services to sustain the brigade's operation.

=== 24 Commando Regiment Royal Engineers ===
Formed in April 2008, 24 Commando Engineer Regiment is a unit of the British Army's Royal Engineers which supports 3 Commando Brigade Royal Marines.

== RMB Chivenor in the media ==
On 21 November 2008 the BBC Top Gear series filmed segments near to Chivenor. In the segments the presenter Jeremy Clarkson takes part in a mock battle on the beach at Instow with around 30 marines from Chivenor and elsewhere.

The Sea Kings from 22 squadron A-Flight at Chivenor took a starring role in Episode 6 of the National Geographic Channel documentary television series Sea Patrol UK, with B-Flight of 22 Squadron at AAC Wattisham alongside Royal Navy and Coastguard units.

The 2011 BBC television series The Choir: Military Wives featured Chivenor. The programme documented choirmaster Gareth Malone forming a choir of wives and partners of Chivenor personnel deployed on active service in the Afghanistan War. In forming a choir, Malone aimed to raise the women's morale and raise their profile in the public perception. The song Wherever You Are was recorded by the Military Wives Choir and was released as a single in December 2011, with proceeds going to the Royal British Legion and SSAFA Forces Help.
