= San Carlos Water =

Bay on East Falkland

Coordinates: 51.508°S 59.080°W

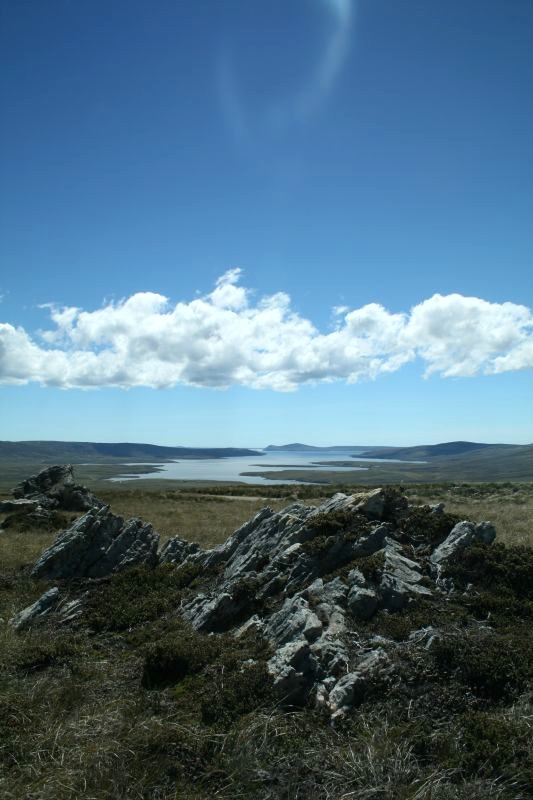
View of San Carlos Water from the south end, near Ajax Bay.

San Carlos Water is a bay/fjord on the west coast of East Falkland, facing onto the Falkland Sound.

== Name ==
Despite its Spanish-sounding name, there is a wide discrepancy with the Spanish usage, for in Spanish "Estrecho de San Carlos" refers to all of the much larger Falkland Sound, which runs between the two main islands of West Falkland and East Falkland.

The settlements of San Carlos and Port San Carlos on the Water, as well as San Carlos River, all take their names from the ship San Carlos, which visited in 1768.

== Description ==
San Carlos Water is a fjord-like inlet at an angle of 45° to the Falkland Sound coastline, thereby offering shelter from the weather in the Sound (which is itself sheltered from the South Atlantic by bluffs in the north and an archipelago in the south). The inlet is 9.3 miles (15 km) in length and for about half of its length, is about 1.2 miles (2 km) wide. It is flat-bottomed with a depth of between 20 and 30 metres (66 and 98 ft); the 20 m isobath lying about 660 feet (200 m) offshore. The tidal range at Port San Carlos varies between 0.9 and 1.6 metres (2 ft 11 in and 5 ft 3 in) (for neap and spring tides respectively) with low water being between 0.3 and 0.7 metres (1 ft 0 in and 2 ft 4 in) above the chart datum. The San Carlos settlement lies close to the head of the inlet.

The inlet has eight official anchorage points.

The smaller and shallower Port San Carlos is an inlet to the north of San Carlos Water.

== Settlements ==
- Ajax Bay
- Campo Verde
- San Carlos
- Port San Carlos

== History ==
San Carlos Water became notorious during the Falklands War as "Bomb Alley" during the Battle of San Carlos. British troops routed the Argentine land forces, but British ships were pounded by Argentine air raids. It was of crucial strategic value in the amphibious assault, and British invasion of Argentine-occupied East Falkland.

Along with Grantham Sound, it is one of the proposed East Falkland terminals for the anticipated ferry to West Falkland.

== Gallery ==
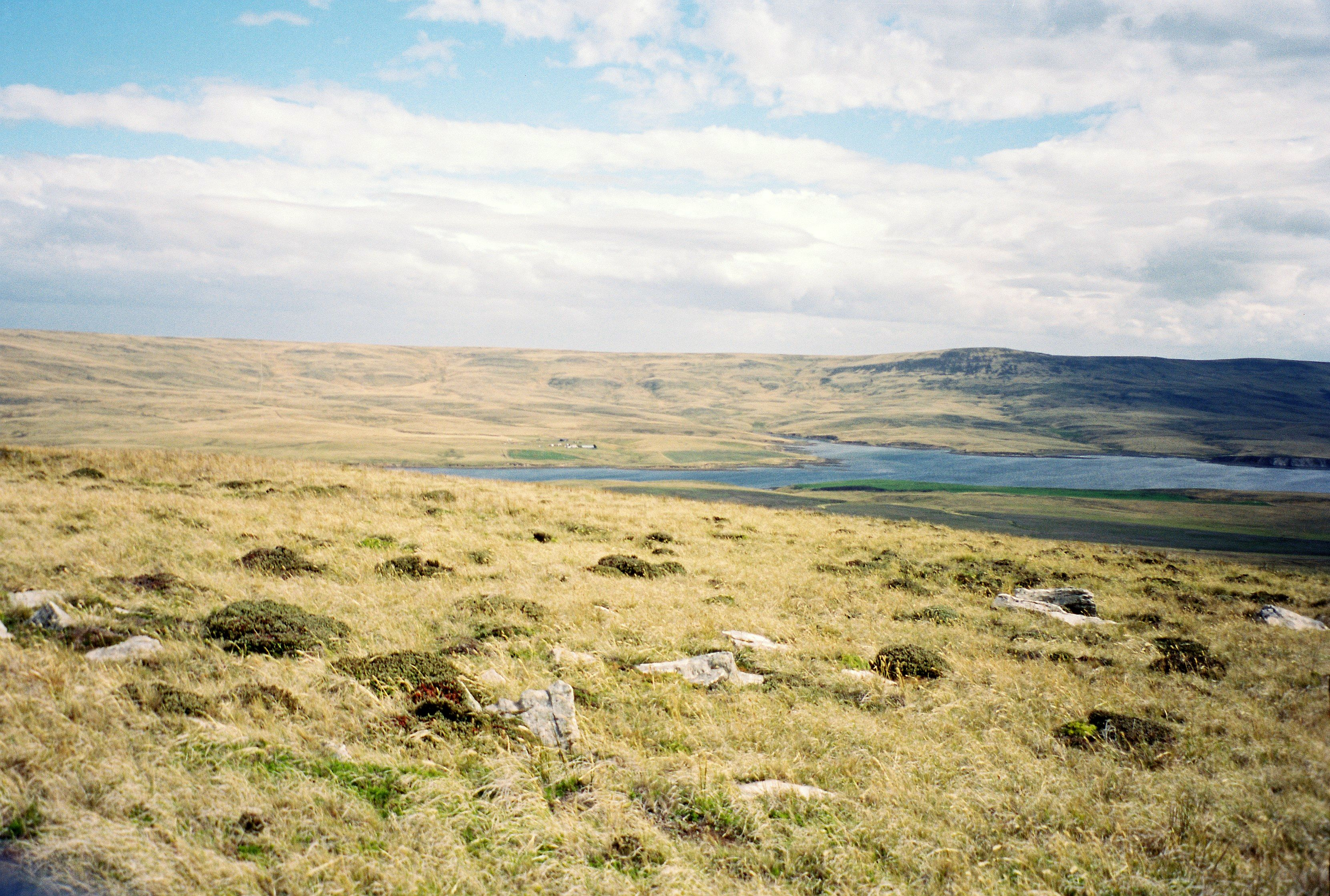
Landing site of 2 Para at Blue Beach, San Carlos Water.

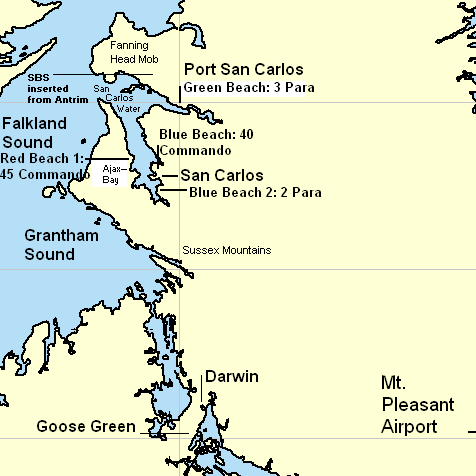
San Carlos Water and British landing sites in Falklands War

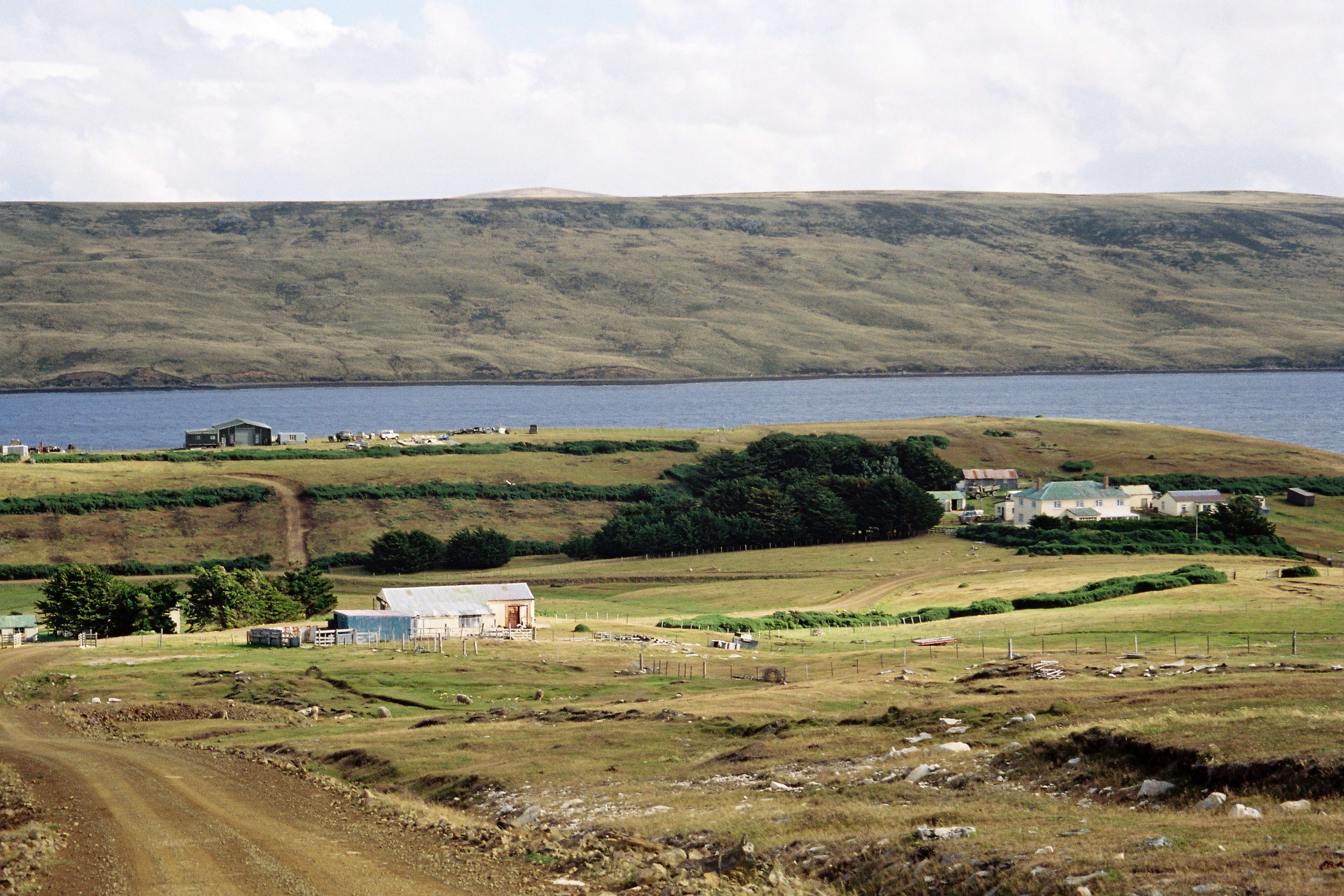
Port San Carlos

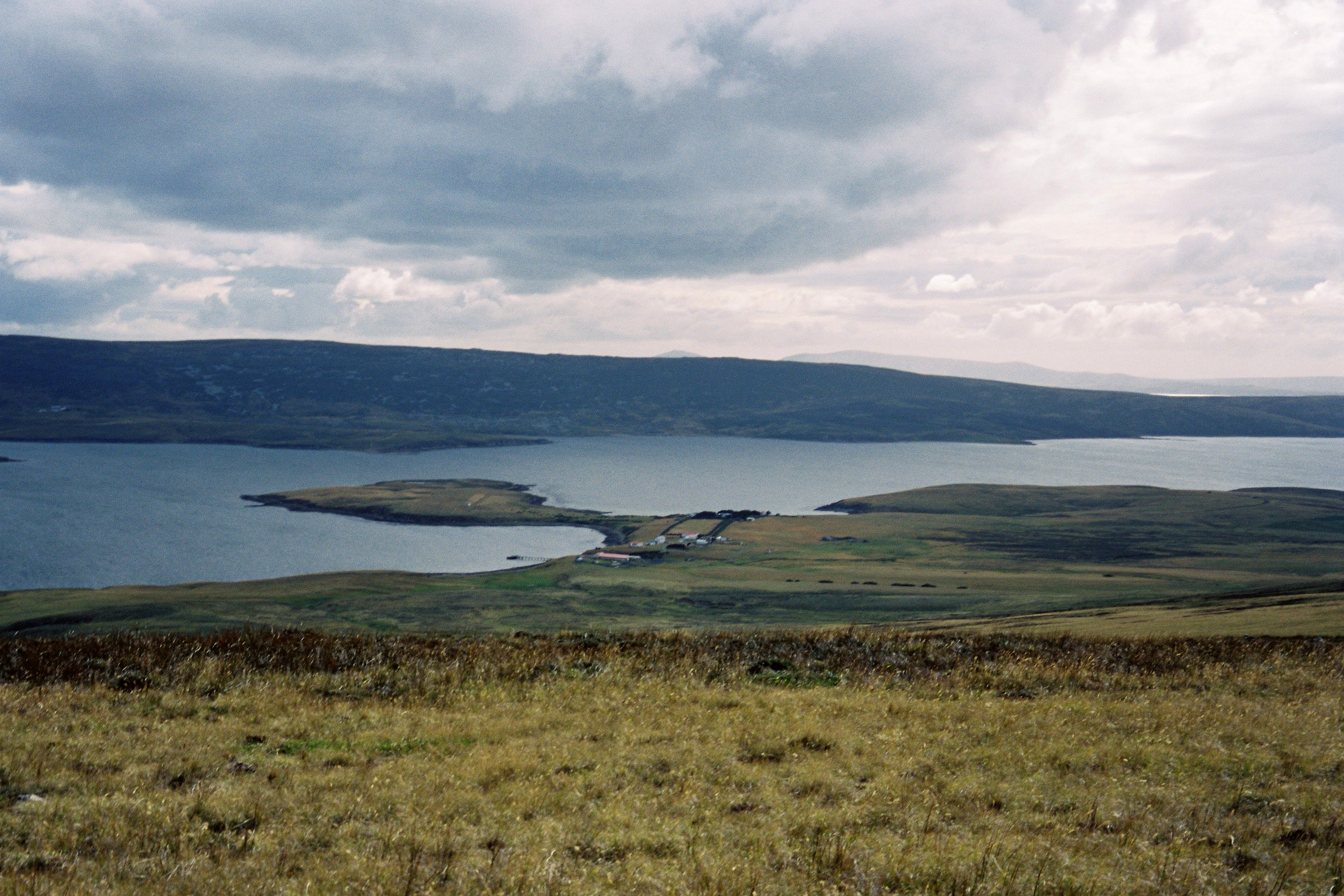
San Carlos Settlement

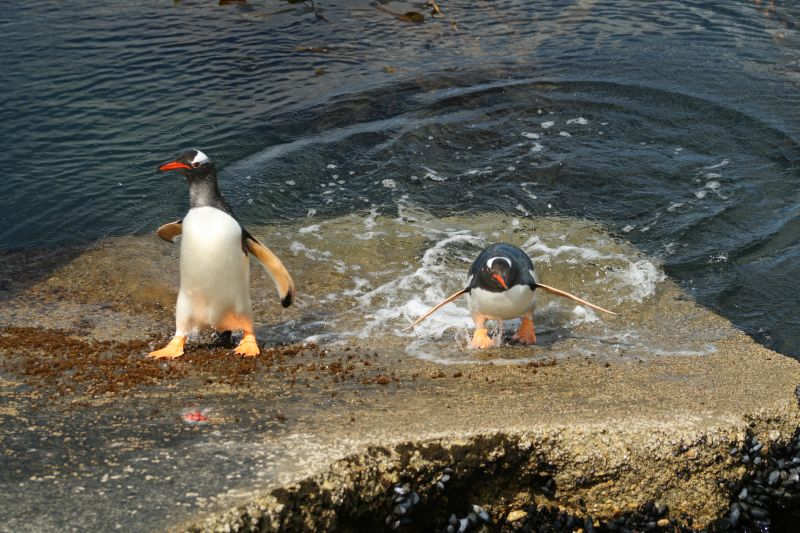
Gentoo penguins, the current residents of Ajax Bay

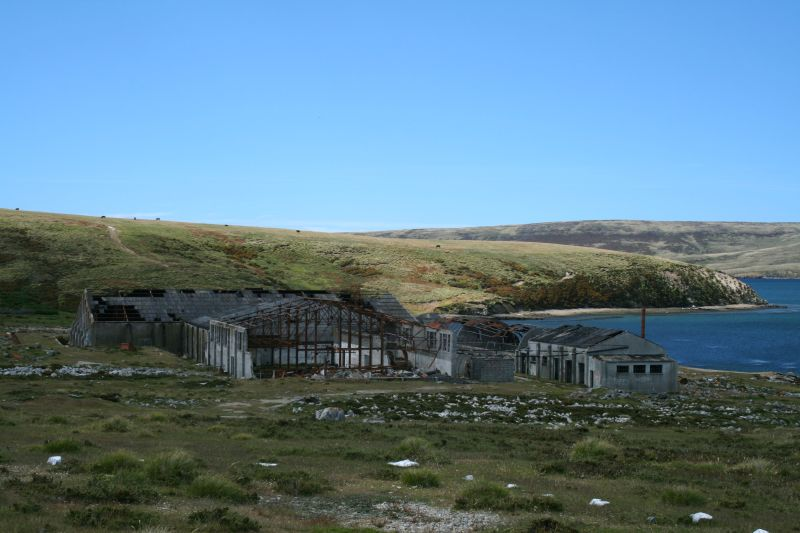
The ruined freezer plant at Ajax Bay

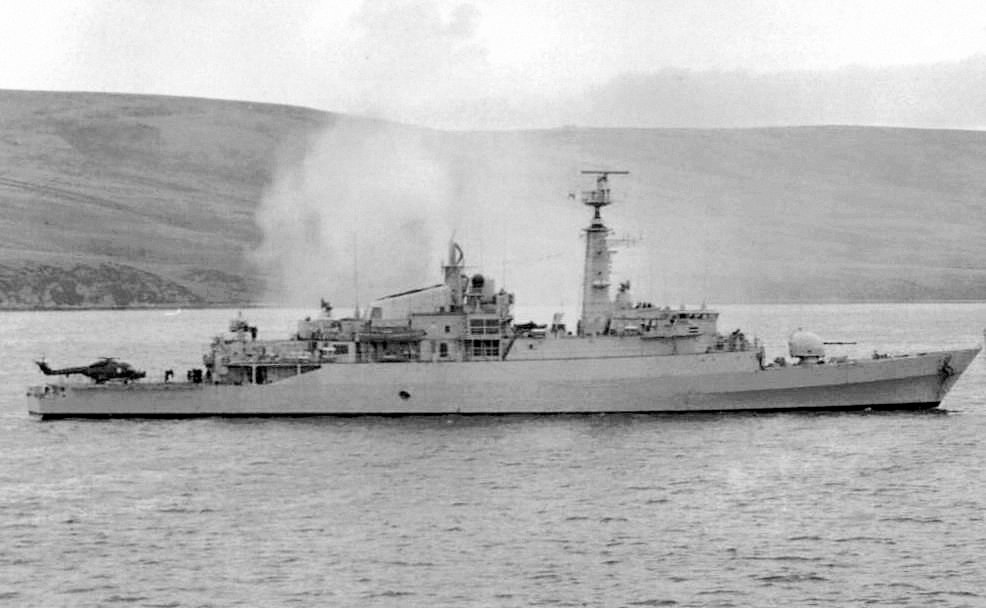
HMS Antelope returning to San Carlos Water 23 May 1982
