= Ovens (disambiguation) =

Ovens are thermally insulated chambers used for cooking.

Ovens may also refer to:

== Places ==
=== Australia ===
- Ovens River, a river in Victoria, Australia, named after explorer John Ovens
  - Ovens, Victoria, a town located on the river
    - Ovens railway station, a closed station
  - Electoral district of Ovens, the town's former electoral district
  - Electoral district of Ovens Valley, the town's current electoral district
  - Ovens Murray, a region encompassing the district

=== Elsewhere ===
- Ovens, County Cork, a village in Ireland
- Ovens Auditorium, an auditorium in Charlotte, North Carolina
- The Ovens, Nova Scotia

== People ==
- Denis Ovens (born 1957), English darts player
- Gilbert Ovens (1884 or 1885 to 1963), English footballer
- Jerry Ovens (born 1959), British Royal Naval officer
- John Ovens (1788–1825), Australian civil engineer and explorer
- Jürgen Ovens (1623–1678), Frisian painter
- Patrick Ovens (1922–1994), British Royal Naval officer

== Ships ==
- HMAS Ovens, an Oberon-class submarine of the Royal Australian Navy, named after John Ovens
