= United Kingdom Commando Force =

Brigade sized commando force of the United Kingdom

United Kingdom Commando Force (3 Commando Brigade)
- Badge of UKCF
- Active: 14 February 1942 – present
- Country: United Kingdom
- Branch: Royal Marines; British Army; Royal Navy; Royal Air Force
- Type: Commando
- Role: Special operations-capable
- Size: Brigade
- Garrison/HQ: HQ: Stonehouse Barracks, Plymouth
- Nickname: The Commandos
- March: Quick: "Sarie Marais"
- Engagements: Second World War; Jewish insurgency in Mandatory Palestine; 1947–48 Civil War in Mandatory Palestine; Korean War; Suez Crisis; Malayan Emergency; Cyprus dispute; Cyprus Emergency; Turkish Invasion of Cyprus; Indonesia-Malaysia Confrontation; Aden Emergency; The Troubles; Dhofar Rebellion; Falklands War; Battle of Wireless Ridge; Battle of Goose Green; Persian Gulf War; Bosnian War; Kosovo War; Sierra Leone Civil War; Iraq War; Operation Ellamy; War in Afghanistan

Commanders
- Brigade Commander: Brigadier James Norman

Insignia
- United Kingdom Commando Force Badge

The United Kingdom Commando Force (UKCF), previously called 3 Commando Brigade, is the special operations capable commando formation of the Royal Marines. It is composed of Royal Marine Commandos and commando qualified personnel from the Royal Navy, British Army and Royal Air Force.

The brigade was formed 1 September 1943 at Dorchester with personnel from 102 RM Brigade, during the Second World War, with a mixture of Army Commando and Royal Marine Commando units, and was deployed to the South-East Asian Theatre of World War II to conduct operations against the invading forces of Imperial Japan, such as the Burma Campaign. After the Second World War, the Army Commandos were disbanded and the brigade became a Royal Marine formation. In the 2020s, the United Kingdom Commando Force has again become a mixed formation with the addition of commando-qualified soldiers from the Royal Artillery and Royal Engineers to provide support for the Royal Marine Commandos. Since the end of the Second World War, it has been involved in a number of engagements such as the Suez Crisis, Falklands War, Gulf War and the War in Afghanistan.

== History ==
=== Second World War ===
Between September and November 1943, in Scotland, 102nd Brigade, Royal Marines Division, was detached from the division, to form the independent 3rd Special Service Brigade – a joint British Army-Royal Marines formation. The founding commander was Brigadier Wilfrid Nonweiler and it was composed of the following units:

- No. 1 Commando (Army);
- No. 5 Commando (Army);
- No. 42 Commando (Royal Marines); and
- No. 44 Commando (Royal Marines).

Nos. 1 and 5 Commandos had already earned battle honours as units in, respectively, the North African and Madagascar campaigns. Because "Commando", at the time, implied a company/battalion-sized unit, the name "Special Service" was instead used for British commando brigades. (However, the term "Commando Brigade" was often used informally, because "Special Service" was unpopular and had a superficial similarity to the name of the notorious German Schutzstaffel (SS).) The brigade was later officially renamed 3rd Commando Brigade.

On 10 November 1943, elements of the brigade embarked at Gourock, bound for India. It was intended that the brigade would be used in operations against Japanese forces in the South-East Asia theatre, such as the Burma campaign. However, the limited shipping capacity available at the time meant that the relocation was prolonged and the components of the brigade were not reunited until late 1944. Lt Col. Peter Young was transferred from the Normandy campaign to become second-in-command of 3rd Commando Brigade. Young succeeded Nonweiler as commander of the brigade.

During January 1945, the brigade was involved in the campaign to recapture Arakan, including the battles of Myebon peninsula and Kangaw. The brigade was then withdrawn to India to prepare for Operation Zipper, a proposed amphibious operation to recapture the Malayan peninsula. The atomic bombs against Japan precipitated an earlier surrender of Japan than expected. The 3rd Commando Brigade moved to secure Hong Kong – a British crown colony that was under Japanese occupation in 1941–45. During 1946, British Army personnel and units within the 3rd Commando Brigade were demobilised or transferred elsewhere and it became a Royal Marine formation.

=== Post Second World War ===
3 Commando Brigade's most high-profile operation after the war was the Suez Crisis, when it took part in the amphibious assault against Egyptian targets. During Operation Musketeer, units of the brigade made a helicopter-borne assault.

1971 saw the withdrawal of British forces from the Far East and Persian Gulf. The brigade returned to the UK with other British units. It moved to Stonehouse Barracks in Plymouth, where it remains to this day.

=== Operation Corporate ===
The brigade's next large operation was in 1982. Argentina invaded the Falkland Islands, and 3 Commando Brigade, reinforced by 2 Para and 3 Para, was one of the two main British land formations that took part in operations to recapture the islands (the other was 5th Infantry Brigade). The brigade landed at San Carlos Water and marched across East Falkland to Stanley. Argentine units were defeated in several sharp engagements, and their forces surrendered on 14 June.

=== Gulf War ===
In the aftermath of the 1991 Gulf War, the brigade was deployed on a non-combat task in northern Iraq. The Iraqi Kurds had suffered immensely during the war and in its aftermath, and the brigade was used due to its rapid deployment ability. It provided humanitarian aid to the Kurds and saved many from starvation.

=== 21st century ===
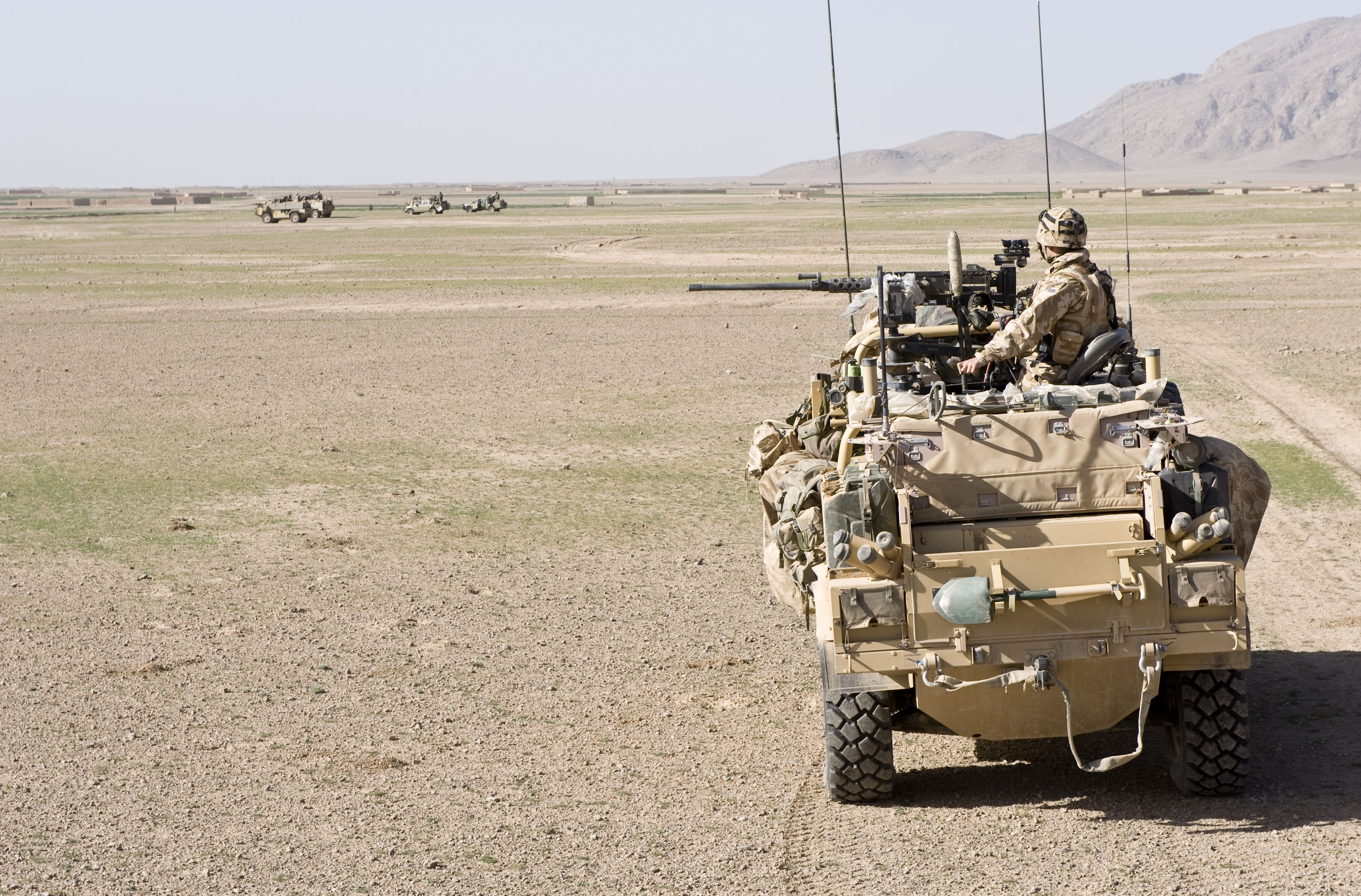
A Jackal armoured vehicle of 3 Commando Brigade, Royal Marines, on patrol during Operation Fibonacci near Kuh-e Baba and Shin Ghar, Helmand, Afghanistan.

The brigade has been involved in major campaigns, including Operation Veritas in Afghanistan, 2001 and 2002, and Operation Telic during the 2003 invasion of Iraq. Iraq saw heavy fighting occur in the early stages of the campaign, as the brigade made its first amphibious assault in over 20 years by landing on the Al-Faw peninsula in south-east Iraq. In 2006, the brigade returned to Afghanistan on Operation Herrick, replacing 16 Air Assault Brigade, and intense fighting occurred.

In 2022, 3 Commando Brigade was rebranded to the United Kingdom Commando Force (UKCF), a process that started in 2020 and completed in 2024.

== Falklands War order of battle ==
The order of battle was as follows:
Commander: Brigadier JHA Thompson

- 29 Commando Regiment Royal Artillery (Lt Col MJ Holroyd Smith)
  - 7th (Sphinx) Battery Royal Artillery / 105 mm L118 Light Guns x 6 Land Rover 101 Forward Control x 6 Land Rover series IIA x 6
  - 8th (Alma) Battery Royal Artillery / 105 mm L118 Light Guns x 6 Land Rover 101 Forward Control x 6 Land Rover series IIA x 6
  - 79th (Kirkee) Battery Royal Artillery / 105 mm L118 Light Guns x 6 Land Rover 101 Forward Control x 6 Land Rover series IIA x 6
  - 148th (Meiktila) Battery (Primary role is as a Naval Gunfire Support Forward Observation (NGSFO) battery.)
- 40 Commando, Royal Marines (Lt Col MPJ Hunt) — Blue Beach 1 - Sapper Hill. (†1)
- 42 Commando, Royal Marines (Lt Col NF Vaux) — Mount Kent - Mount Harriet. (†2)
- 45 Commando, Royal Marines (Lt Col AF Whitehead) — Red Beach - Douglas Settlement - Two Sisters. (†12)
- 2nd Battalion, Parachute Regiment (Lt Col H Jones VC)^{^1} — Blue Beach 2 - Goose Green & Darwin - Wireless Ridge. (†18)
  - 29th Field Battery RA
  - 43 (Lloyds) Air Defence Battery
    - 1st troop / Blowpipe x 6、Leyland 4-tonne truck x 6
    - 2nd troop / Blowpipe x 6、Leyland 4-tonne truck x 6
    - 3rd troop / Blowpipe x 6、Leyland 4-tonne truck x 6
  - 9 Parachute Squadron Royal Engineers (†4)
  - 10th Field Troop, / Land Rover 101FC Ambulance x 16
  - 81st Department Ordnance Company
  - 613th Tactical Air Control Party

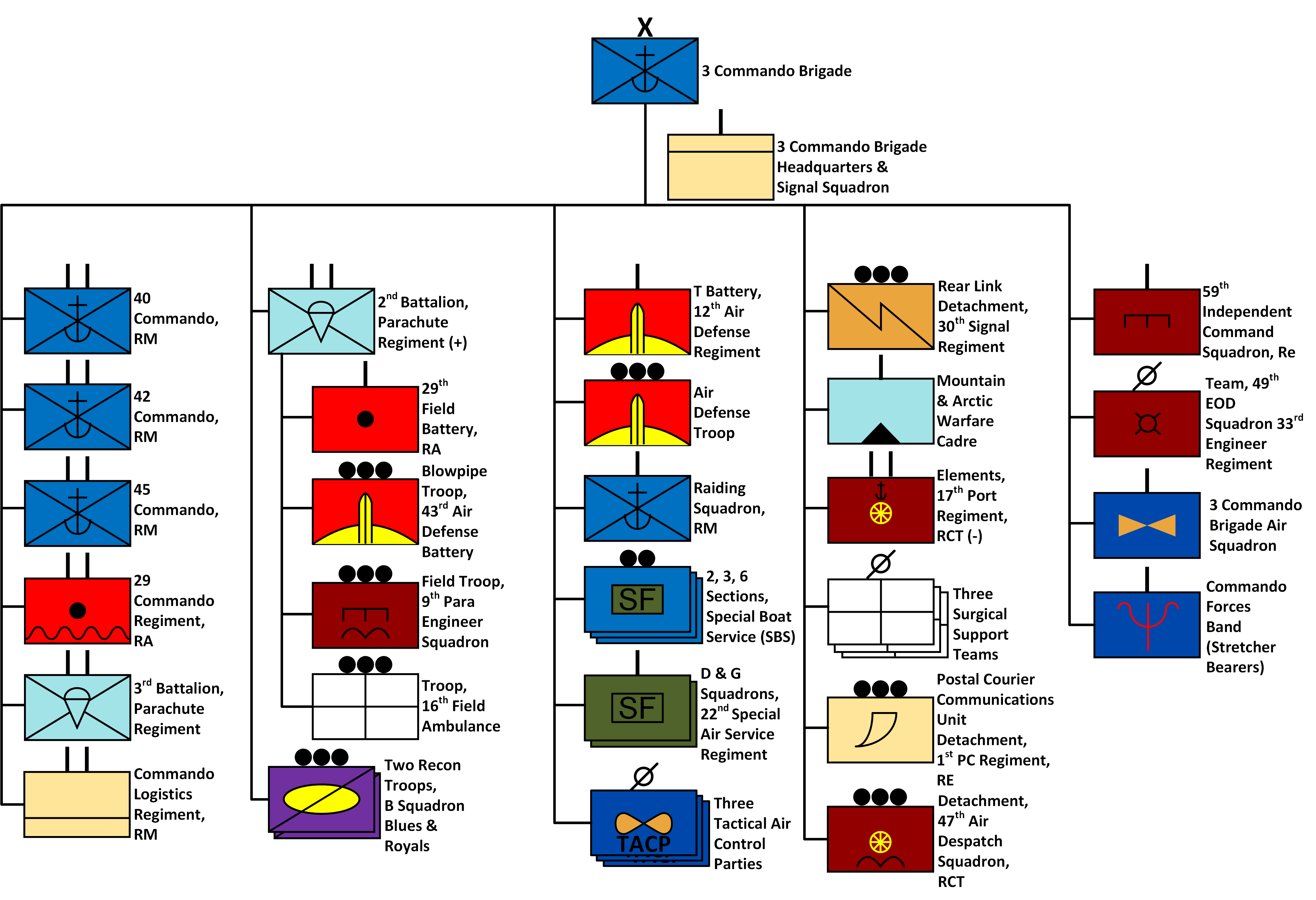
Task organization of UK 3 Commando Brigade in Falklands War

- 3rd Battalion, Parachute Regiment (Lt Col HWR Pike) — Green Beach - Teal Inlet - Mount Longdon. (†21)
  - 1st Ordnance Coy Detachment / Land Rover 109 S111 Ambulance x 1
- Commando Logistic Regiment, Royal Marines (Lt Col I Helberg) (†1) Bedford MK UBRE (Unit Bulk Refuelling Equipment) x9 comprising (Civgas x5, Dieso x3, AVCAT x1), ROF Nottingham Eager Beaver Air Portable Fork Lift Truck (APFLT) x8, Can-Am motorcycles x8.
- 3 Commando Brigade HQ and Signals Squadron (Maj R Dixon) (†1)
- 3 Commando Brigade Aviation Squadron (Major CP Cameron) / 9 x Gazelle AH.1 helicopters (†3) 6 x Scout helicopters (†1)
- Reconnaissance Troops (Lt M Coreth)
- B Squadron, Blues and Royals / FV101 Scorpion x 4、FV107 Scimitar x 4、FV106 Samson x 1
- T Battery (Shah Sujah's Troop) Royal Artillery 12 Air Defence Regiment / Rapier Missile FS.A Launcher x 12、Land Rover 101 Forward Control x 12
- Air Defence Troop / Blowpipe Missile launchers x 12 Leyland 4-tonne truck x 12 Land Rover 109 series III x 12
- 1st Raiding Squadron, Royal Marines (Capt Chris Baxter) / Rigid Raiding Craft x 17
- Mountain and Arctic Warfare Cadre, Royal Marines (Capt Rod Boswell)
- SBS (Maj Jonathan Thomson) 67 men (†1)
  - 2nd, 3rd and 6th Sections
- 22 SAS (Lt Col HM Rose) 107 men (†19)
  - D and G Squadrons
- 1 Tactical Air Control Party
- 2 Tactical Air Control Party
- 3 Tactical Air Control Party
- maintenance group
- Rear link detachment, 30 Signal Regiment (†3)
- Elements of 17 Port Regiment Royal Corps of Transport.
  - 3 x Mexeflote detachments.
  - 5 x Landing ship logistics detachments.
  - 2 x FV 4018 Centurion BARV
- 3 x Surgical support teams
- Postal courier communications unit detachment of 2 PC Regiment RE, 20 PC Sqn RE (tasked 3 CDO Bde support) & 21 PC Sqn RE (tasked 5 Airborne Bde support)
- Detachment 47 Air Despatch Squadron RCT.
- 59 Independent Commando Squadron Royal Engineers (Maj Roderick Macdonald). (†3)
  - 2 Troop 9 Parachute Squadron Royal Engineers (Capt Robbie Burns)
- Detachment 49 EOD Squadron, 33 Engineer Regiment Royal Engineers (†1)
  - 2 man bomb disposal team
- Y Troop Royal Marines (electronic warfare)
- Commando Forces Band (stretcher-bearers)

^1 - Replaced by Lt Col David Chaundler

== Current organisation ==
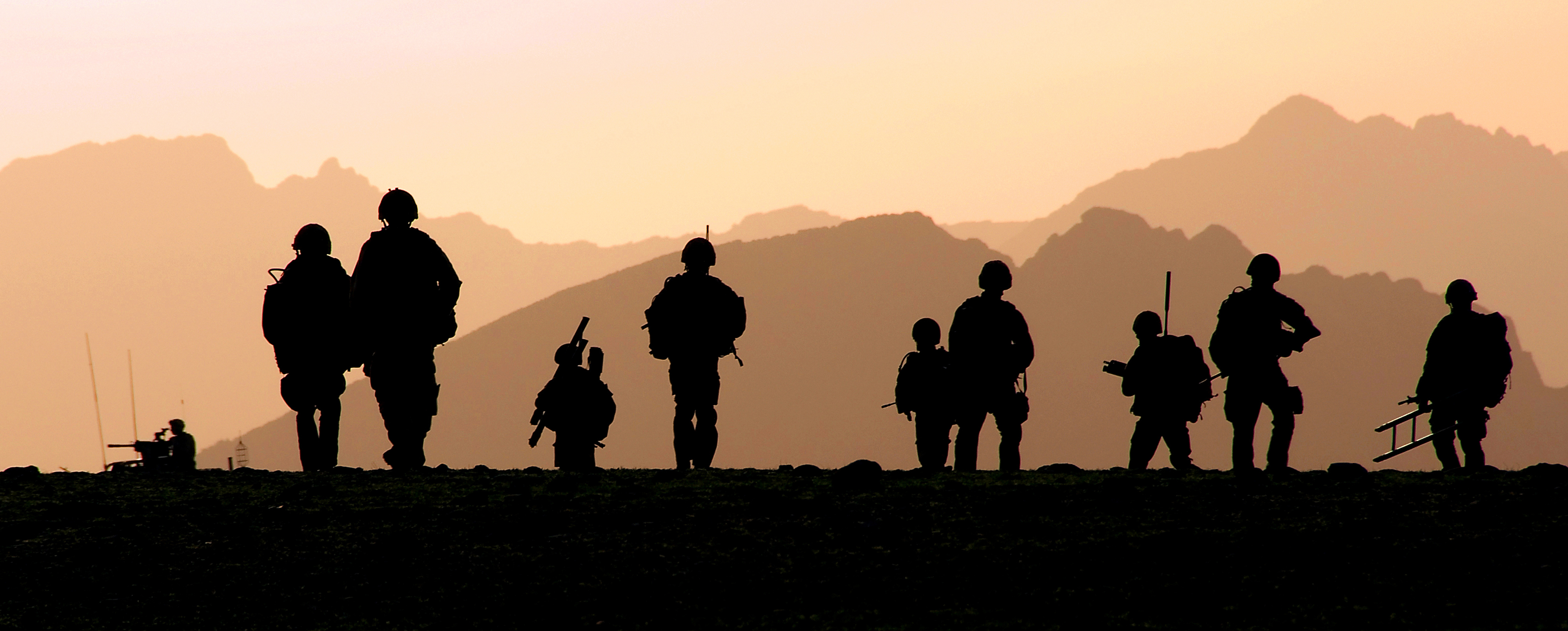
45 Commando Royal Marines in Afghanistan

The UK Commando Force contains Royal Marines, Royal Navy, Army and Royal Air Force personnel. When operating as part of the combined United Kingdom / Netherlands Landing Force, the 1st Marine Combat Group of the Dutch Korps Mariniers is also attached to the brigade.

The subordinate units are:

=== Headquarters, UK Commando Force, at RM Stonehouse ===
- Commander, UK Commando Force is Brigadier Jamie M. Norman
  - Commando EOD Troop from 33 Engineer Regiment (EOD)

==== Headquarters, 40 Commando, at RM Norton Manor ====
- Command Company
- Logistics Company
- Information Warfare Company
- Alpha Company (A Coy)
- Bravo Company (B Coy)
- Charlie Company (C Coy)

==== Headquarters, 42 Commando, at RM Bickleigh ====
- Command Company
- Logistics Company
- Juliet Company (J Coy)
- Kilo Company (K Coy)
- Lima Company (L Coy)
- Mike Company (M Coy)

==== Headquarters, 43 Commando (Fleet Protection Group), at HMNB Clyde ====
- Headquarters Squadron
- Oscar Squadron (O Sqn)
- Papa Squadron (P Sqn)
- Romeo Squadron (R Sqn)

==== Headquarters, 45 Commando, at RM Condor ====
- Command Company
- Logistics Company
- Whisky Company (W Coy)
- X-Ray Company (X Coy)
- Yankee Company (Y Coy)
- Zulu Company (Z Coy)

==== Headquarters, 47 Commando (Raiding Group), at RM Tamar ====
- 539 Raiding Squadron (539 RS)
- 10 (Landing Craft) Training Squadron
- 11 Amphibious Trials and Training Squadron, at RM Instow
- Logistics Squadron

==== Headquarters, 48 Commando Support Group, at RM Chivenor ====
- Headquarters Squadron
- Equipment Support Squadron
- Logistic Support Squadron
  - 383 Commando Petroleum Troop (Army Reserves)
- Medical Squadron
- Landing Force Support Squadron
- Viking Squadron, at Stanley Barracks, Bovington Garrison

==== Headquarters, 30 Commando Information Exploitation (IX) Group, at RM Stonehouse ====
- Headquarters Squadron
  - Intelligence Cell
  - Information Activities Cell
- Surveillance and Reconnaissance Squadron (SRS)
- Yankee Squadron (Y Sqn)
  - Air Defence Troop
- Communications Squadron
- Logistics Squadron
  - Royal Marines Police Troop
- Base Squadron

==== Headquarters, 24 Commando Regiment, Royal Engineers, at RM Chivenor ====
- 56 Commando Headquarters and Support Squadron
  - Commando Diving Team
- 54 Commando Squadron
- 59 Commando Squadron
- 131 Commando Squadron (Army Reserves)
- 24 Cdo REME Workshop

==== Headquarters, 29 Commando Regiment, Royal Artillery, at Royal Citadel, Plymouth ====
- 7 (Sphinx) Battery, at RM Condor.
- 8 (Alma) Commando Battery
- 79 (Kirkee) Commando Battery
- 23 (Gibraltar 1779–1783) Commando Battery
- 148 (Meiktila) Battery, at RM Poole
- 29 Cdo REME Workshop, at the Royal Citadel, RM Condor, RM Poole

== Amphibious Task Group ==
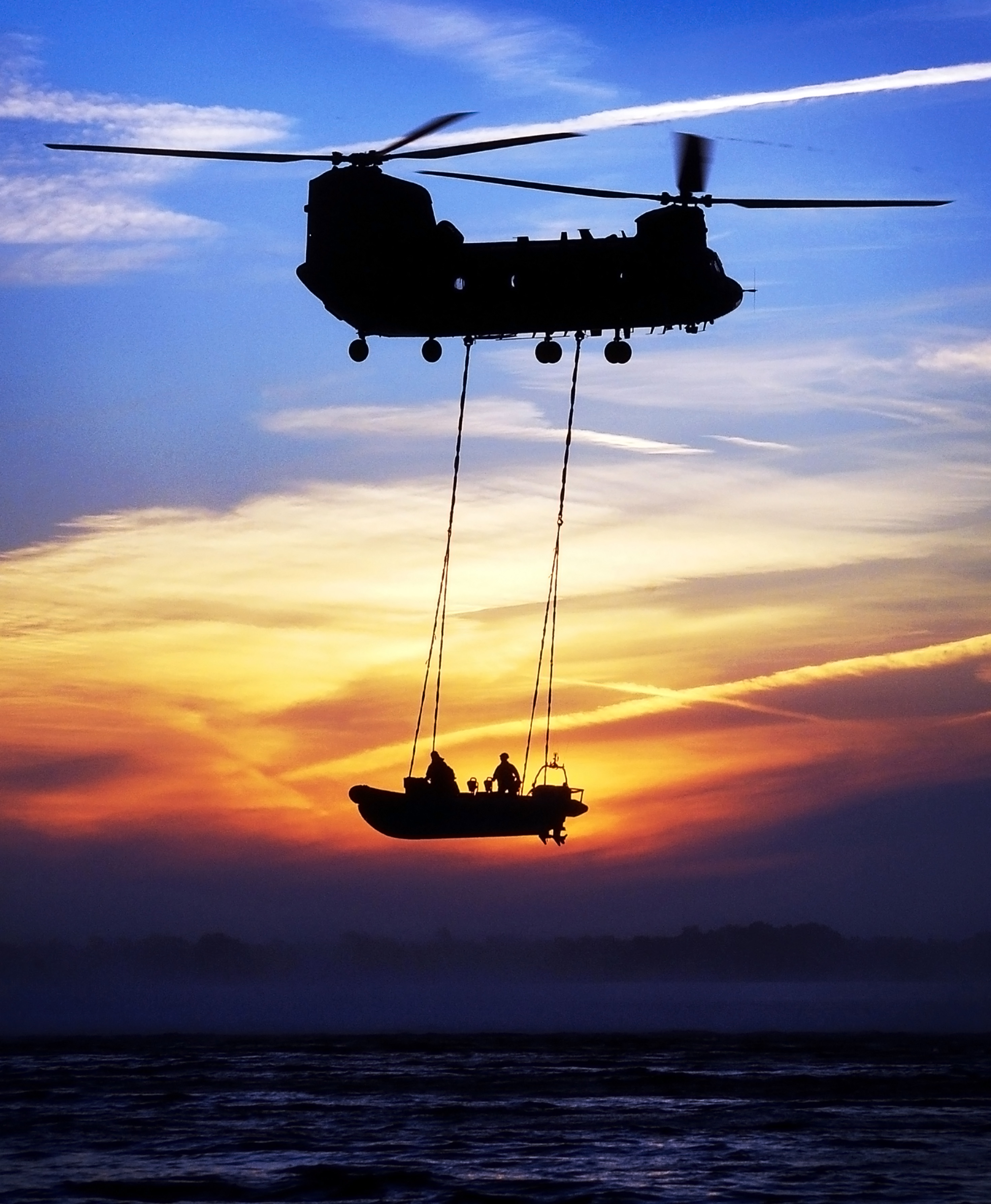
A Royal Marine RIB 'Underslinging', from an RAF Chinook as a method of quick extraction and insertion of waterborne personnel

Formerly known as the Amphibious Ready Group, the Amphibious Task Group (ATG) is a mobile, balanced amphibious warfare force, based on a Commando Group and its supporting assets, that can be kept at high readiness to deploy into an area of operations. The ATG was normally based around specialist amphibious ships, such as the former HMS Ocean, the only helicopter carrier in the British fleet until she was decommissioned and sold to Brazil in 2018. Ocean was designed and built to accommodate an embarked commando and its associated stores and equipment. The strategy of the ATG is to wait "beyond the horizon" and then deploy swiftly as directed by HM Government. The whole amphibious force is intended to be self-sustaining and capable of operating without host-nation support. The concept was successfully tested in operations in Sierra Leone.

Since the disposal of both HMS Ocean and, in 2024/25, the Albion class assault ships, British amphibious forces are reliant on deployment from the Queen Elizabeth class aircraft carriers and from amphibious warfare vessels of the Royal Fleet Auxiliary. Aircraft of the Commando Helicopter Force can be accommodated on these vessels.

== Commando Helicopter Force ==
The Commando Helicopter Force (CHF) forms part of the Fleet Air Arm. It comprises three helicopter squadrons and is commanded by Joint Aviation Command (JAC).

CHF is neither under the permanent control of Headquarters Commando Forces nor that of the Commandant General Royal Marines, but rather is allocated to support Commando units as required by JAC. It uses both Merlin HC4/4A medium-lift and Wildcat AH1 light transport/reconnaissance helicopters to provide aviation support to Commando Forces.

== Commanders ==
Commanders have included:

- 1943–1944 Brigadier Wilfrid Nonweiler
- 1944 Brigadier Peter Young (acting)
- 1944–1945 Brigadier Campbell Hardy
- 1948–1951 Brigadier Campbell Hardy
- 1951–1952 Brigadier Cecil Phillips
- 1952–1954 Brigadier James Moulton
- 1954–1955 Brigadier Ian Riches
- 1955–1957 Brigadier Reginald Madoc
- 1957–1959 Brigadier Robert Houghton
- 1959–1960 Brigadier Peter Hellings
- 1960–1962 Brigadier Norman Tailyour
- 1962–1964 Brigadier Francis Barton
- 1964–1965 Brigadier Leslie Marsh
- 1965–1966 Brigadier Anthony Willasey-Wilsey
- 1966–1968 Brigadier Ian Gourlay
- 1968–1970 Brigadier Peter Whiteley
- 1970–1972 Brigadier Patrick Ovens
- 1972–1975 Brigadier Roger Ephraums
- 1975–1977 Brigadier John Richards
- 1977–1979 Brigadier Jeremy Moore
- 1979–1981 Brigadier Michael Wilkins
- 1981–1983 Brigadier Julian Thompson
- 1983–1984 Brigadier Martin Garrod
- 1984–1986 Brigadier Henry Beverley
- 1986–1988 Brigadier Robin Ross
- 1988–1990 Brigadier Andrew Whitehead
- 1990–1992 Brigadier Andrew Keeling
- 1992–1994 Brigadier David Pennefather
- 1994–1995 Brigadier Jonathan Thomson
- 1995–1997 Brigadier Anthony Milton
- 1997–1998 Brigadier Robert Fulton
- 1998–1999 Brigadier David Wilson
- 1999–2001 Brigadier Robert Fry
- 2001–2002 Brigadier Roger Lane
- 2002–2004 Brigadier James Dutton
- 2004–2006 Brigadier John Rose
- 2006–2007 Brigadier Jeremy Thomas
- 2007–2008 Brigadier David Capewell
- 2008–2008 Brigadier Buster Howes
- 2008–2009 Brigadier Gordon Messenger
- 2010–2011 Brigadier Ed Davis
- 2011–2013 Brigadier Martin Smith
- 2013–2014 Brigadier Stuart M. Birrell
- 2014–2015 Brigadier Charles Stickland
- 2015–2017 Brigadier Jim Morris
- 2017–2018 Brigadier Gwyn Jenkins
- 2018–2020 Brigadier Matt Jackson
- 2020–2022 Brigadier Richard Cantrill
- 2022–2024 Brigadier Duncan Forbes
- 2024–present Brigadier James Norman

== Battle honours ==
The following Battle honours were awarded to the British Commandos during the Second World War.

- Vaagso
- Norway 1941
- St. Nazaire
- Dieppe
- Normandy Landing
- Dives Crossing
- Flushing
- Westkapelle
- Rhine
- Leese
- Aller
- North-West Europe 1942 '44–45
- Litani
- Syria 1941
- Steamroller Farm
- Sedjenane 1
- Djebel Choucha
- North Africa 1941–43
- Landing in Sicily
- Pursuit to Messina
- Sicily 1943
- Landing at Porto San Venere
- Termoli
- Salerno
- Monte Ornito
- Anzio
- Valli di Comacchio
- Argenta Gap
- Italy 1943–45
- Greece 1944–45
- Crete
- Madagascar
- Adriatic
- Middle East 1941 '42 '44
- Alethangyaw
- Myebon
- Kangaw
- Burma 1943–45

== See also ==
- 1st Commando Brigade
- 2nd Special Service Brigade
- 4th Special Service Brigade
- Australian commandos
- British Armed Forces
- Commandos (United Kingdom)
- Marine expeditionary brigade – American equivalent
- Military history of Britain
- Netherlands Marine Corps – Dutch equivalent and part of UK/NL Landing Force
- Ski warfare
