= Julian Thompson (Royal Marines officer) =

Royal Marines officer and historian

Major-General Julian Thompson CB OBE
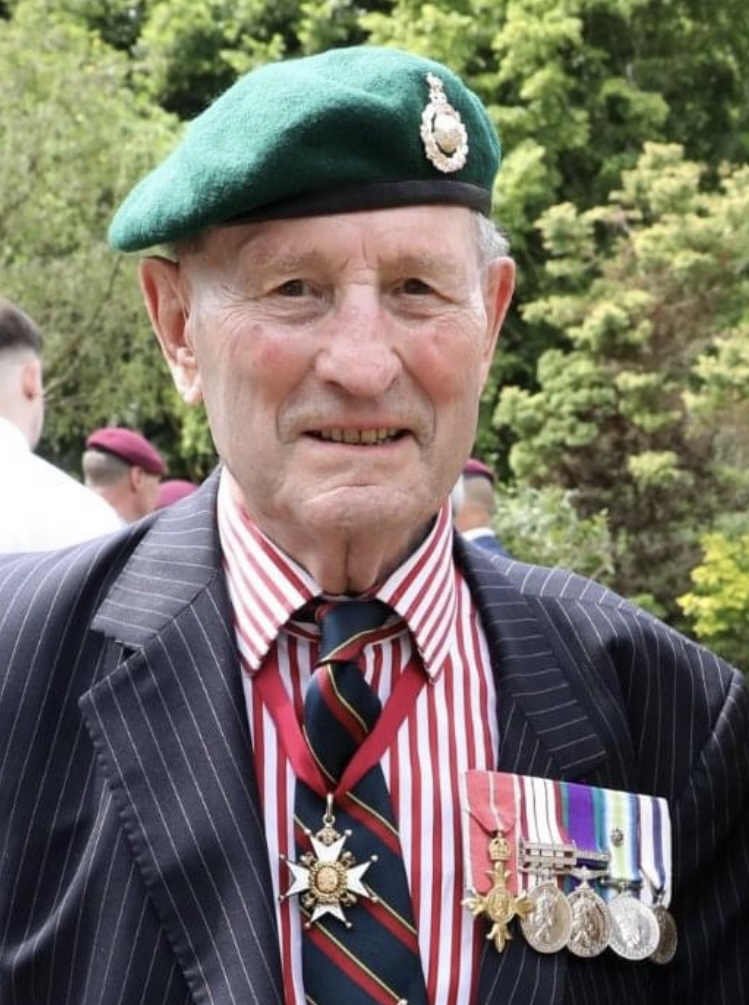
- Major General Julian Thompson at Aldershot Military Cemetery - 18 June 2022
- Born: 7 October 1934 (age 92)
- Military career
- Allegiance: United Kingdom
- Branch: Royal Marines
- Service years: 1952–1986
- Rank: Major-General
- Commands: 3 Commando Brigade; 40 Commando
- Conflicts: Cyprus Emergency; Indonesia–Malaysia confrontation Aden Emergency; Falklands War
- Awards: Companion of the Order of the Bath; Officer of the Order of the British Empire

Major-General Julian Howard Atherden Thompson, CB, OBE (born 7 October 1934) is a military historian and former Royal Marines officer who commanded 3 Commando Brigade during the Falklands War.

== Early life ==
Thompson was born on 7 October 1934 to Major A. J. Thompson DSO MC and Mary Stearns Thompson (née Krause). He was educated at Sherborne School, an all-boys public school in Dorset.

== Military career ==
Thompson joined the Royal Marines in 1952. Between 1954 and 1969, he served in 40, 42, 43, 45 Commandos Royal Marines. In 1954 he served in Egypt. He also served two tours in Cyprus for the Cyprus Emergency, in which he deployed to the Troodos Mountains on counterinsurgency operations, during which time he and his platoon lived in a monastery. During the 1960s he was deployed as a staff officer to Borneo for the Indonesia–Malaysia confrontation, and also to Aden for the Aden Emergency. He was promoted to major at the end of 1968, and to lieutenant colonel at the start of 1975. He was appointed commanding officer of 40 Commando in 1975, and commanded it for two and a half years. He was promoted to colonel in mid-1978, and later to brigadier and appointed as commander of 3 Commando Brigade in 1981. Thompson commanded 3 Commando Brigade in the 1982 Falklands War. Promoted to major general, he served as commander of the Training Reserve Forces and Special Forces RM from 1983 to 1986. He retired in 1986.

== Later life ==
In retirement, Thompson has written extensively on British military history. His first book, No Picnic was published in 1985, whilst he was still serving in the Royal Marines.

From 1987 to 1997, Thompson was a senior research fellow in "logistics and armed conflict in the modern age" at King's College, University of London. He has been a visiting professor at the Department of War Studies of King's since 1997.

Thompson appeared in the TV series A Game of War, Episode 2 broadcast on Sunday 10 August 1997. The wargame was the Battle of Naseby.

Thompson is the Chairman of Veterans for Britain, an organization with the aim of "[putting] forward the defence and security arguments for the UK to vote to leave the European Union" and following the referendum to "support Her Majesty's Government in the task of restoring full sovereign control to all aspects of the defence of the realm in accordance with that mandate of the people".

In an interview with journalist Steven Edginton that was published to YouTube in October 2026, Thompson criticized the crossing of migrants and refugees into the United Kingdom through the English Channel, remarking that, "We could stop them tomorrow if we really had the guts. I'd shoot them, sorry, but I would." When contacted by journalists regarding his comments, he clarified that the vessels should be shot, but not the occupants. Shadow home secretary Chris Philp responded to Thompson's remarks by stating that shooting migrant boats would not be permissible.

== Selected works ==
- Thompson, Julian (1985). No Picnic: 3 Commando Brigade in the South Atlantic, 1982 (1 ed.). Leo Cooper in association with Secker & Warburg. ISBN 978-0436520525.
- Thompson, Julian (2009). 3 Commando Brigade in the Falklands: No Picnic. Pen & Sword Books Limited. ISBN 978-1-84415-879-9. This is a revised version of No Picnic (1985)
- Thompson, Julian (1990). Ready for Anything: The Parachute Regiment at War, 1940–1982. Fontana/Collins. ISBN 978-0-00-637505-0.
- Thompson, Julian (1994). The Imperial War Museum Book of Victory in Europe.
- Thompson, Julian (1998). The Imperial War Museum Book of War Behind Enemy Lines. Sidgwick & Jackson. ISBN 0-330-36761-7.
- Thompson, Julian (2002). The Imperial War Museum Book of the War in Burma, 1942–45: A Vital Contribution to Victory in the Far East. Sidgwick & Jackson. ISBN 978-0-283-07280-2.
- Thompson, Julian (2003). Royal Marines: From Sea Soldiers to a Special Force. Diane Pub Co. ISBN 978-0-7567-6441-8.
- Thompson, Julian (2006). The 1916 Experience: Verdun and the Somme. Carlton. ISBN 978-1-84442-450-4.
- Thompson, Julian (2009). Call to Arms: The Great Military Speeches. Book Sales, Inc. ISBN 978-1-84724-266-2.
- Thompson, Julian (2011). Dunkirk: Retreat to Victory. Skyhorse Publishing Inc. ISBN 978-1-61145-314-0.
- Thompson, Julian; Millett, Allan R. (2012). The Second World War in 100 Objects. Carlton. ISBN 978-1-78097-103-2.
- Thompson, Julian (2016). The Royal Navy – 100 Years of Modern Warfare. London: Andre Deutsch. ISBN 978-0233004860.

== Honours and awards ==
- June 1978: OBE
- October 1982: Companion of the Order of the Bath (CB)

Military offices
Preceded by Michael Wilkins	Brigadier Commanding 3 Commando Brigade; 1981–1983	Succeeded by Martin Garrod
