= RM Turnchapel =

Former Royal Marines military installation

RM Turnchapel
- Near Hooe in England
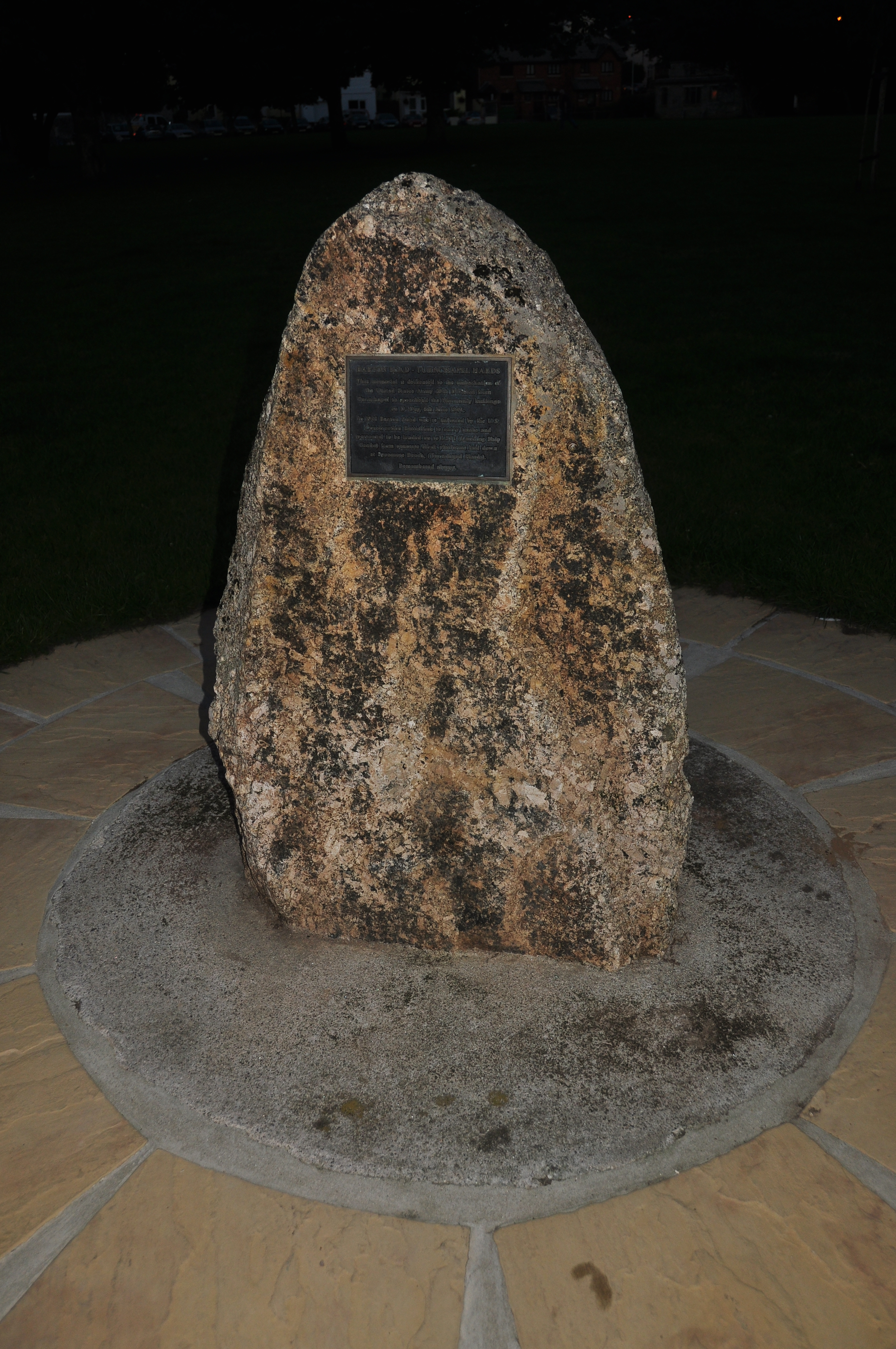
- Memorial at Turnchapel Hards

Site information
- Type: Royal Marines Base
- Owner: Ministry of Defence
- Operator: Royal Navy

Location
- Shown within Devon
- Coordinates: 50°21′34″N 004°06′58″W

Site history
- Built: 1903
- Built for: Admiralty
- In use: 1903 - 2014

Royal Marines Turnchapel is a former Royal Marines military installation in South Devon located 1.2 miles (1.9 km) east of Plymouth, Devon, and 3.6 miles (5.8 km) north east of Torpoint, Cornwall, England.

== History ==
The site was established as a shipyard in the 17th century and expanded rapidly under the ownership of John Parker, 1st Earl of Morley in the 1790s. The Admiralty acquired the site in 1903 and used it as a naval oil fuel depot until it was badly damaged by aerial bombing in 1940 during the Second World War. The slipway was used as an embarkation point by troops of the US 29th Division boarding LSTs for the Normandy landings in June 1944. The site became a Royal Marines base in 1993 and went on to become the home of 539 Assault Squadron RM and its feeder unit, 10 Landing Craft Training Squadron. These units moved to RM Tamar in early 2013.

The site was declared surplus to military requirements by the Ministry of Defence and bought by marine leisure business The Yacht Havens Group. The business took possession of the waterfront site on the 28 March 2014 after buying it for an undisclosed sum.
