= Ewen Southby-Tailyour =

Royal Marines officer

- Born: 18 January 1942 (age 84)
- Military career
- Allegiance: United Kingdom
- Branch: Royal Marines
- Rank: Lieutenant Colonel
- Conflicts: Aden Emergency; Dhofar Rebellion; Operation Banner; Falklands War; Yugoslav Wars
- Awards: Officer of the Order of the British Empire; Sultan of Muscat's Bravery Medal
- Other work: Yacht skipper, author

Lieutenant Colonel Ewen Southby-Tailyour, OBE (born 18 January 1942) is a British author, sailor, and retired Royal Marine. He served for 32 years in the Royal Marines and, after retiring, he concentrated on his sailing and writing careers and has written a number of books on military history and the Royal Marines.

== Early life ==
The son of General Sir Norman Tailyour, former Commandant General Royal Marines, Southby-Tailyour comes from a family with strong ties to the Royal Marines; an uncle, two cousins and a step-brother have previously served in the Corps. He attended Stubbington House School, Nautical College Pangbourne (where he was captain of sailing), and the University of Grenoble in France.

== Military career ==
Southby-Tailyour's early career included active service on operations in Aden, Northern Ireland, Oman, the Falkland Islands, Hong Kong and 13 winters in the Norwegian Arctic developing the use of fast raiding and assault craft for supporting commando operations. He also served in the United States, India, Djibouti, the West Indies, the North Sea (oil-rig protection), Cyprus, Corsica, Malta, Bahrain, the Yemen, Kuwait, and the South Atlantic from 1977 to 1979.

Southby-Tailyour was attached to the United States Marine Corps in 1977 in the eastern Mediterranean and, earlier, to the French Commando Hubert in Toulon, with which he attended their combatant nageur course and served in a submarine, a helicopter carrier and ashore in Corsica and Djibouti with the French Foreign Legion. Following Arabic-language courses at the Berlitz School of Languages in London and the Command Arabic Language School in Aden, he was seconded for two years as a reconnaissance platoon and company commander with the Sultan of Muscat's Armed Forces during the Dhofar War, where he was awarded the Sultan's Bravery Medal for gallantry in action.

In 1978, Southby-Tailyour was the officer commanding a small Royal Marines detachment that was posted to the Falkland Islands. The following year he was promoted to major. It was then that on his own initiative he sailed around and extensively charted the waters around the islands, and had a 100+ page notebook filled with data on harbours, inlets and landing spots. This work, for which he was elected the UK's 1982 Yachtsman of the Year, and his personal knowledge of the area would later prove invaluable in the Falklands War. During this campaign he was the inshore navigational adviser to the amphibious commanders prior to leading the major landings. He was appointed an Officer of the Order of the British Empire and recommended for the Distinguished Service Cross.

It was Southby-Tailyour who provided the Falkland Islands (Governor's) Flag for the raising ceremony at Government House on 17 June 1982. He had stolen the flag as a souvenir during his 1978–1979 military tour, and during the operation to retake the islands from Argentina, Southby-Tailyour confessed the theft and offered the flag back to the governor, Sir Rex Hunt. Hunt told him that he would forgive the theft if Southby-Tailyour personally put the flag back from where he had taken it, so in this manner, he obliged.

External image
- Royal Marines posing with the flag that Southby-Tailyour originally stole - and subsequently returned - to Government House

Southby-Tailyour's final four years' service were spent on the staffs of the Commandant General Royal Marines, and the Director General Surface Ships (Amphibious Group), helping to design and procure the next generation of amphibious shipping and craft, most notably Ocean, the Albion-class landing platform dock, the LCVP Mk 4 and the LCU Mk 10.

== Post-military career ==
On retirement Southby-Tailyour was employed by the Foreign & Commonwealth Office for duties in the Republic of Serbian Krajina and, subsequently, in Croatia along the Dalmatian Coast. He was retained by ABS Hovercraft as their amphibious and military adviser while also learning to 'fly' hovercraft. Currently he is believed to be aligned to Griffon Hoverwork.

In 1991, he established an amphibious consultancy that advised builders and governments on the design of amphibious vessels and the procedures for their operation.

He has published 19 books on amphibious-related subjects (including two novels) and is a commercial yacht skipper and amateur, high latitude explorer. His book 3 Commando Brigade: Helmand Assault reached number seven in the Sunday Times best selling list. He has also written an historical novel of the Falklands that has been optioned for a full-length feature film. His other interests include watercolour painting, shooting and snorkelling. He was a member and chairman of the World Ship Trust and a member of the National Maritime Historical Society and the Society for Nautical Research. He was a Fellow of the Royal Geographical Society and a Fellow of the Royal Institute of Navigation. He is a member of the Society of Authors.

Southby-Tailyour has been a member of the Royal Yacht Squadron since 1970 and has twice been awarded an engraved Rolex watch for exploring in high latitudes as well as winning the Camrose Trophy. Since 1972 he has been a member of the Royal Cruising Club which has twice awarded him the Goldsmith Exploration Award for charting the last five un-surveyed fiords in Iceland and for surveying much of the Falkland Islands coastline. He entered for the first nine, quadrennial Two Handed Round Britain and Ireland races and navigated six Fastnet races. The Ocean Cruising Club awarded him their Award of Merit for sailing single-handed during an Arctic winter. In 2021 he was invited to join the South West Shingles Yacht Club.

In 2006, he inaugurated and continued to organise the single-handed, Jester Challenge for yachts between 20 and 30 feet overall until he 'retired' in 2021 when he was 'elected' the Patron. Held annually the destinations are, in turn, Newport, Rhode Island, United States, Terceira in the Azores and Baltimore in the Republic of Ireland. In 2013 the Ocean Cruising Club awarded him the Jester Medal for "services to single-handed sailing."

He sat on the Royal National Lifeboat Institution (RNLI) lifeboat committee for ten years, was the South West area governor of the Ocean Youth Club, and was the South West area member of the cruising committee of the Royal Yachting Association (RYA).

In July 2019 he was sworn as a Younger Brother of Trinity House.

== Personal life ==
Southby-Tailyour lives in south Devon and the French Pyrenees.

== Bibliography ==
- Falkland Islands Shores [Macmillan/Nautical, 1985]
- Reasons in Writing: A Commando's View of the Falklands War [Leo Cooper, 1993]
- Amphibious Assault Falklands: The Battle for San Carlos co-written with Michael Clapp [Leo Cooper/Orion, 1996]
- Blondie: A Life of Lieutenant-Colonel HG Hasler DSO OBE [Leo Cooper, 1998]
- Jane’s Amphibious Warfare Capabilities [Jane's. Biannual to 1999]
- Jane's Amphibious and Special Forces [Jane's. Biannual since 1999 to 2014]
- The Next Moon. A Special Operations Executive Agent in France, co-written with André Hue [Penguin/Viking, 2004]
- Jane's Special Forces Equipment Recognition Guide [HarperCollins, 2005]
- HMS Fearless, The Mighty Lion [Pen and Sword, 2006]
- Skeletons for Sadness [Seafarer Books, 2007]
- 3 Commando Brigade, Helmand [Random House/Ebury Press, 2008]
- Commando Assault, Helmand [Random House/Ebury Press, 2010]
- Nothing Impossible. A Portrait of The Royal Marines 1664 – 2010 [TMI, 2010]. Editor
- Exocet Falklands. The Untold Story of Special Forces Operations [Pen and Sword, 2014]
- Death's Sting. Duplicity and Deceit in the Balkans [Westlake Books 2017]
- Paid to Predict. Duplicity, Deceit and Dishonesty among 'Allies' in the Balkans [Fonthill Media 2020]
- A Life in Letters. Plus a selection of, very many, essays [Michael Terence Publishing 2024]
- Amphibious Warfare Post WWII. A Royal Marine's Anthology [Pen and Sword,2026]
- A Life Under Sail. The Aquatic Adventures of a Royal Marine [Pen and Sword, 2026]
