= 1980 Special Honours =

British government recognitions

As part of the British honours system, Special Honours are issued at the Monarch's pleasure at any given time. The Special Honours refer to the awards made within royal prerogative, operational honours and other honours awarded outside the New Years Honours and Birthday Honours.

== Most Excellent Order of the British Empire ==
=== Commander of the Order of the British Empire (CBE) ===
Military Division

Army

- Brigadier David Edwin Miller, O.B.E., M.C. (418335), late The King's Own Royal Border Regiment.

=== Officer of the Order of the British Empire (OBE) ===
Military Division

Army

- Lieutenant-Colonel Robin John Macgregor Drummond, M.B.E. (451228), The Royal Anglian Regiment.
- Colonel John Martin Carruthers Garrod.
- Lieutenant-Colonel Michael Marples (461475), Royal Corps of Signals.
- Lieutenant-Colonel Colin Grierson Mattingley (459299), The King's Own Scottish Borderers.

=== Member of the Order of the British Empire (MBE) ===
Military Division

Army

- Major Julian Antony Ball, M.C. (489891), The King's Own Scottish Borderers.
- Major Reginald Harvey Bicker (485939), Ulster Defence Regiment.
- 22835384 Warrant Officer Class 1 David Duffus. Queen's Own Highlanders (Seaforth and Camerons).
- Major Archibald Alexander Martin (490020), Ulster Defence Regiment.
- Major Graham Gerald Messervy-Whiting (483808), Intelligence Corps.
- Captain Norman Oswald Miller (494091), Intelligence Corps.
- Captain Norman Nelson (446069), Ulster Defence Regiment
- Major Nicholas John Ridley (471334), Queen's Own Highlanders (Seaforth and Camerons).
- Major William Barry Stevens, M.C. (483827), Royal Regiment of Artillery.
- Major Keith George Turner (471371), Royal Corps of Signals.
- 23520878 Warrant Officer Class 2 George William Wardle, The Gloucestershire Regiment.
- Major Thomas Ian Macdonald Waugh (475258), Royal Corps of Signals.

== Air Force Cross (AFC) ==
- Captain Stephen Murray-Twinn (501667), Army Air Corps.

== Queen's Gallantry Medal (QGM) ==
- 24158506 Corporal (Acting Sergeant) George Phillip Corcoran, 4th/7th Royal Dragoon Guards.
- 23919330 Warrant Officer Class 2 Ian Trevor Grey, Royal Army Ordnance Corps.
- 23778667 Staff Sergeant Peter Charles Jones, The Devonshire and Dorset Regiment.
- 24117467 Sergeant (Acting Staff Sergeant) George William Frederick Southam, The Green Howards (Alexandra, Princess of Wales's Own Yorkshire Regiment)
