= Robert Fulton (Royal Marines officer) =

Governor of Gibraltar

Lieutenant General Sir Robert Fulton KBE KStJ
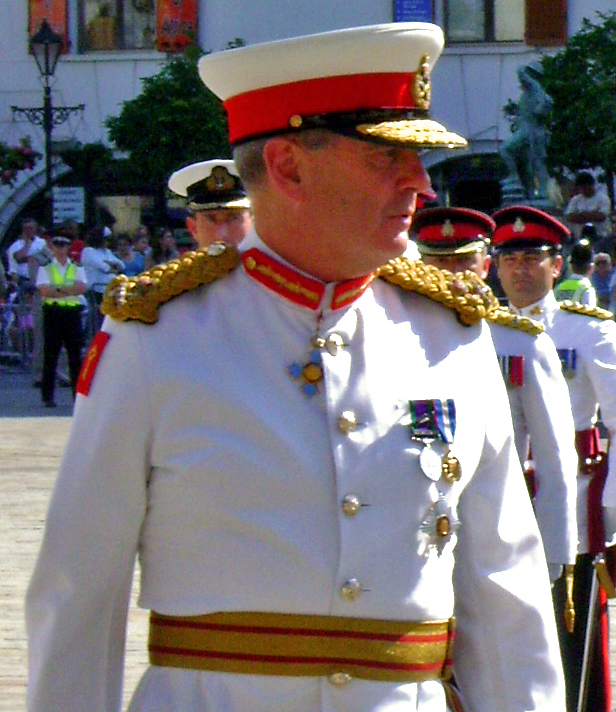
- Fulton in 2008

Governor of Gibraltar
- In office 27 September 2006 – 21 October 2009
- Monarch: Elizabeth II
- Chief Minister: Peter Caruana
- Preceded by: Sir Francis Richards
- Succeeded by: Sir Adrian Johns

Personal details
- Born: 1948 (age 77–78)
- Education: University of East Anglia; Royal College of Defence Studies

Military service
- Allegiance: United Kingdom
- Branch/service: Royal Marines
- Years of service: 1972–2006
- Rank: Lieutenant General
- Commands: Commandant General Royal Marines; 3 Commando Brigade; 42 Commando
- Battles/wars: Bosnian War
- Awards: Knight Commander of the Order of the British Empire; Knight of the Order of St John

Viceregal styles of Sir Robert Fulton (2006–2009)
- Reference style: His Excellency
- Spoken style: Your Excellency

Lieutenant General Sir Robert Henry Gervase Fulton, KBE, KStJ (born 1948) is a retired British Royal Marines officer who served as Governor of Gibraltar from 2006 to 2009.

== Career ==
Educated at Eton College and the University of East Anglia where he graduated with a Bachelor of Arts, Fulton joined the Royal Marines in 1972. After serving as a junior officer for a number of years, he was appointed to the Staff College at Warminster. He became a company commander in 42 Commando in 1983 and then undertook various staff appointments before joining the Directing Staff of the Army Staff College, Camberley in 1990.

Fulton was appointed commanding officer of 42 Commando in 1992, Assistant Director for CIS Operational Requirements in 1994, and a member of the Rapid Reaction Force Operations Staff in UNPROFOR in 1995. After attending the Royal College of Defence Studies and then the Higher Command and Staff Course in 1996, he became commander of 3 Commando Brigade in 1997, Commandant-General Royal Marines in 1998 and equipment capability manager at the Ministry of Defence in 2001. In 2003 was promoted to lieutenant general on appointment as Deputy Chief of the Defence Staff (Equipment Capability). He was knighted as a Knight Commander of the Order of the British Empire in the 2005 Birthday Honours.

In September 2006, Fulton took over as Governor of Gibraltar. He was Britain's first governor to witness change in the Gibraltar constitution since 1967. He was appointed a Knight of the Most Venerable Order of Saint John on 5 August 2009, and his term as governor ended in October 2009.

In April 2007 it was announced that Fulton would lead an enquiry into the capture of 15 British military personnel by Iranian forces; he reported to Parliament later that year.

A Freeman of the City of London, Fulton serves as a Court Assistant of the Worshipful Company of Haberdashers and, in July 2010, became chief executive officer of the Global Leadership Foundation.

He was appointed King of Arms of the Order of the British Empire in 2016, serving as such until May 2024.

== Family ==
Fulton married Midge Free in 1975; they had two sons before they separated in 2010.

== See also ==
- Politics of Gibraltar

Military offices
| Preceded by David Pennefather | Commandant General Royal Marines; 1998–2001 | Succeeded by Robert Fry |
| Preceded by Jock Stirrup | Deputy Chief of the Defence Staff; 2003–2006 | Succeeded by Andrew Figgures |
Government offices
| Preceded by Sir Francis Richards | Governor of Gibraltar; 2006–2009 | Succeeded by Sir Adrian Johns |
Heraldic offices
| Preceded by Sir Peter Abbott | King of Arms of the Order of the British Empire; 2016–2024 | Succeeded by Sir Simon Mayall |
