= Norman Tailyour =

General Sir Norman Tailyour KCB DSO*
- Born: 12 December 1914; Newbridge, County Kildare, Ireland
- Died: 28 December 1979 (aged 65); Ashford, Kent, England
- Relatives: Ewen Southby-Tailyour (son)
- Military career
- Allegiance: United Kingdom
- Branch: Royal Marines
- Service years: 1933–1968
- Rank: General
- Commands: Commandant General Royal Marines; 3 Commando Brigade; 45 Commando; 27th Battalion
- Conflicts: Second World War; Cyprus Emergency; Suez Crisis
- Awards: Knight Commander of the Order of the Bath; Companion of the Distinguished Service Order & Bar; Mentioned in Despatches (2)

General Sir Norman Hastings Tailyour, KCB, DSO & Bar (12 December 1914 – 28 December 1979) was a Royal Marines officer who served as Commandant General Royal Marines from 1965 to 1968.

== Military career ==
Tailyour was commissioned into the Royal Marines in 1933. He served in the Second World War as commander of the Royal Marines on the Landing Craft Base HMS Robertson from 1943, as executive officer on the Land Craft Base HMS St Mathew from later that year and then as commander of 27th Battalion Royal Marines in North West Europe from 1945. He was Mentioned in Despatches in 1945 and appointed a Companion of the Distinguished Service Order (DSO) for his command of the battalion.

Tailyour was appointed commanding officer of 45 Commando in 1954. As lieutenant colonel, he was the commanding officer of 45 Commando, flown off HMS Theseus by helicopter to land at the Port Said during the Suez Crisis in 1956, when he was also wounded by a Fleet Air Arm Wyvern – friendly fire. This was the first helicopter-borne, opposed assault from the sea in history. He was again Mentioned in Despatches for his services in the Suez in 1956, and awarded a Bar to his DSO for his command of 45 Commando in Cyprus later that year.

Tailyour became commander of the Royal Marine Barracks at Plymouth in 1957, chief of staff to the Amphibious Warfare Representative in Washington D. C. in 1958 and commander of 3 Commando Brigade in 1960. He went on to be Commander Plymouth Group of the Royal Marines in 1962. He was appointed a Companion of the Order of the Bath in 1963, and promoted to Knight Commander in the 1966 Birthday Honours. He became Commandant General Royal Marines in 1965 before retiring in 1968.

== Retirement ==
In retirement Tailyour was Captain of Deal Castle from 1972 to 1980.

== Personal life ==
Tailyour's son, Ewen Southby-Tailyour, was also a Royal Marines officer, who served with distinction in Dhofar and the Falklands War.

Military offices
Preceded by Sir Malcolm Cartwright-Taylor	Commandant General Royal Marines; 1965–1968	Succeeded by Sir Peter Hellings
