= Peter Hellings =

Royal Marines general

General Sir Peter Hellings KCB DSC MC DL
- Born: 6 September 1916; Kingston, Surrey, England
- Died: 2 November 1990 (aged 74); Yelverton, Devon, England
- Military career
- Allegiance: United Kingdom
- Branch: Royal Marines
- Service years: 1935–1971
- Rank: General
- Commands: Commandant General Royal Marines (1968–71); 3 Commando Brigade (1959–60); 40 Commando (1958–59); 42 Commando; 41 Commando
- Conflicts: Second World War; Malayan Emergency; Cyprus Emergency
- Awards: Knight Commander of the Order of the Bath; Distinguished Service Cross; Military Cross; Mentioned in dispatches (2)

General Sir Peter William Cradock Hellings, KCB, DSC, MC, DL (6 September 1916 – 2 November 1990) was a Royal Marines officer who served as Commandant General Royal Marines from 1968 to 1971.

== Military career ==
Hellings joined the Royal Marines in 1935 and served in the Second World War as a company commander with 40 Commando, being awarded the Distinguished Service Cross in 1940 and the Military Cross during the fighting in Italy in 1943. He was also mentioned in dispatches in 1946 in recognition of his "gallant and distinguished services in North West Europe" during the closing stages of the war.

Shortly after the end of the war, Hellings commanded 41 Commando and 42 Commando. He saw active service in Malaya in the early 1950s during the Malayan Emergency, and in Cyprus during the Cyprus Emergency, for which he was mentioned in despatches in 1958. He was appointed commanding officer of 40 Commando in 1958, commander of 3 Commando Brigade in 1959 and commander of the Infantry Training Centre Royal Marines in 1960. He went on to be Deputy Director of the Joint Warfare School in 1963, Chief of Staff to the Commandant General Royal Marines in 1964 and Commander Portsmouth Group Royal Marines in 1967. His last appointment was as Commandant General Royal Marines in 1968 before retiring in November 1971.

In retirement Hellings became Chairman of the Gas Consumers' Council for the South West, and lived at Milton Combe in Devon.

Military offices
Preceded by Sir Norman Tailyour	Commandant General Royal Marines; 1968–1971	Succeeded by Sir Ian Gourlay
