= Ian Gourlay =

English Royal Marines general (1920–2013)

General Sir Ian Gourlay KCB CVO OBE MC
- Born: 13 November 1920; Chorlton, Lancashire, England
- Died: 17 July 2013 (aged 92); London, England
- Military career
- Allegiance: United Kingdom
- Branch: Royal Marines
- Service years: 1940–1975
- Rank: General
- Commands: Commandant General Royal Marines (1971–75); 3 Commando Brigade (1966–68); 42 Commando (1963–65)
- Conflicts: Second World War; Cyprus Emergency; Suez Crisis; Indonesia–Malaysia confrontation
- Awards: Knight Commander of the Order of the Bath; Commander of the Royal Victorian Order; Officer of the Order of the British Empire; Military Cross; Mentioned in Despatches

General Sir Basil Ian Spencer Gourlay, KCB, CVO, OBE, MC (13 November 1920 – 17 July 2013) was a Royal Marines officer who served as Commandant General Royal Marines from 1971 to 1975.

== Early life ==
Gourlay was born on 13 November 1920 to Brigadier K. I. Gourlay and Victoria May Gourlay (née Oldrini). He was educated at Yardley Court in Tonbridge and Eastbourne College, a private school in Eastbourne, East Sussex.

== Military career ==
Gourlay was commissioned into the Royal Marines in 1940. His commission was confirmed on 20 January 1942 and he was given seniority in the rank of lieutenant from 14 June 1941. He served on the aircraft carrier HMS Formidable, with which he saw active service in the Arctic, the Indian Ocean and the Mediterranean between 1941 and 1944. Promoted to acting captain on 16 June 1944, he served in 43 Commando in Yugoslavia and Italy from 1944 to 1945. He was awarded the Military Cross for his actions fighting at Šolta in the Dalmatian Islands in 1944.

Promoted to captain on 15 June 1949, Gourlay was mentioned in despatches in January 1957 "for distinguished services in operations against terrorists in Cyprus". In the Queen's Birthday Honours that year, he was also appointed Officer of the Order of the British Empire "in recognition of distinguished services in the Operations in the Near East, October To December, 1956". Gourlay was appointed commanding officer of 42 Commando in 1963, Colonel on the General Staff of the Commandant General Royal Marines in 1965, and commander of 3 Commando Brigade in 1966. He went on to be Commander, Training Group Royal Marines in 1968 and Commandant General Royal Marines in 1971, with promotion to lieutenant-general on 1 November 1971, and to full general on 1 November 1973. He was described by Lord Mountbatten, who had been Colonel Commandant of the Royal Marines, as "the best Commandant General the Royal Marines had ever had".

Gourlay was appointed Knight Commander of the Order of the Bath in the 1973 Birthday Honours, and retired from the Royal Marines on 9 June 1975.

== Later life ==
In retirement, Gourlay became Director-General of the United World Colleges, serving from 1975 to 1990. He had been convinced to take up the position by Lord Mountbatten during the end of his time in the Royal Marines. He was appointed Commander of the Royal Victorian Order in the 1990 New Year Honours in recognition of his services in the role.

Gourlay died on 17 July 2013.

== Personal life ==
In 1948, Gourlay married Natasha Zinovieff; they had one son and one daughter. Lady Gourlay died in 2018 at the age of 97.

Military offices
Preceded by Sir Peter Hellings	Commandant General Royal Marines; 1971–1975	Succeeded by Sir Peter Whiteley
