= Patrick Ovens =

Royal Marines major general

Major-General Patrick Ovens OBE MC
- Born: 4 November 1922; Cirencester, England
- Died: 29 January 1994 (aged 71); Southampton, England
- Alma mater: Commando Basic Training Centre
- Spouse: Margaret Mary White (m. 1956)
- Children: 3 (including Jerry Ovens)
- Military career
- Allegiance: United Kingdom
- Branch: Royal Marines
- Rank: Major-General
- Commands: Joint Warfare Establishment; 3 Commando Brigade; 41 Commando
- Conflicts: Korean War; Battle of Chosin Reservoir
- Awards: Officer of the Order of the British Empire; Military Cross

Major-General Patrick John Ovens, OBE, MC (4 November 1922 – 29 January 1994) was a distinguished senior officer in the British Royal Marines. He was awarded the Military Cross for service in the Korean War and later served as an aide-de-camp to Queen Elizabeth II.

== Early life and education ==
Patrick John Ovens was born in Cirencester (Gloucestershire) in the southwest of England, the eldest of four children of Edward Alec Ovens (1897–1961) by his marriage in June 1921 to Mary Linsel Constable (1895–1969). Ovens was educated at King's School, an independent boarding school in Bruton (Somerset), where he was invited to become a governor many years later.

== Military career ==
In 1941, Ovens was commissioned into the Royal Marines. He was stationed on HMS Illustrious in the Mediterranean from 1942 to 1943, before spending the latter part of the war as an instructor at the Royal Marine Depot, Deal. He entered the Commando Basic Training Centre as a lieutenant in 1945 and was posted to the No. 46 (Royal Marine) Commando that same year shortly before it was disbanded.

After the war, Ovens filled a number of training and staff appointments. In the summer of 1950, shortly before the Korean War, he sailed in Samuel Pepys, a Royal Naval Sailing Association yacht, in the race from Newport, Rhode Island to Bermuda.

Ovens won his Military Cross in 1951 during the Korean War. In November 1950, he led a party of seven Marines to safety after they had been surrounded by the Chinese army in the Battle of Chosin Reservoir. Despite the heavy odds against their making it, they successfully navigated their way across the snow-covered hills under cover of darkness to rejoin their own lines at Koto-Ri, four miles to the south.

Ovens "went on to consolidate his reputation as an innovative and resourceful assault engineer." He soon became a key player in destabilising Chinese and North Korean commerce, "quickly demonstrated the imagination and unflappability which were to characterise his whole career."

In 1968, Ovens was appointed an Officer of the Order of the British Empire for his command of 41 Commando. As the commanding officer, he played a leading role in clearing Cornwall's beaches following the SS Torrey Canyon disaster (the county's worst-ever oil spillage).

From 1970 to 1972, Ovens served as commander of the 3 Commando Brigade in succession to Brigadier Peter Whiteley. On 17 July 1972, he was appointed an Aide-de-camp to Queen Elizabeth II.

In 1974, Ovens was promoted to chief of staff to the Commandant General Royal Marines, with the rank of Major general. From 1976 to 1979, he served as Commandant of the Joint Warfare Establishment. He retired on 2 April 1979.

== Personal life ==
In 1952, Ovens married Margaret Mary White. They had two daughters and one son (Jerry Ovens, a Royal Navy commander).
