= David Pennefather =

British Royal Marines general (born 1945)

Major General David Pennefather CB OBE
- Born: 17 May 1945 (age 81)
- Military career
- Allegiance: United Kingdom
- Branch: Royal Marines
- Service years: 1965–1998
- Rank: Major General
- Commands: Commandant General Royal Marines; 3 Commando Brigade; 42 Commando
- Conflicts: The Troubles; Falklands War; Bosnian War
- Awards: Companion of the Order of the Bath; Officer of the Order of the British Empire; Mentioned in Despatches

Major General David Anthony Somerset Pennefather, CB, OBE (born 17 May 1945) is a former Royal Marines officer who served as Commandant General Royal Marines from 1996 to 1998.

== Military career ==
Pennefather was educated at Wellington College and joined the Royal Marines in 1963. He was commissioned as an acting lieutenant in 1965. He was mentioned in despatches for service during the Falklands War.

Pennefather was Commanding Officer of 42 Commando from 1988 to 1990, and was appointed an Officer of the Order of the British Empire in 1990 "in recognition of meritorious service in Northern Ireland". He became commander of 3 Commando Brigade in 1992 and commander of the United Nations Rapid Reaction Force during the Bosnian War, for which he was appointed a Companion of the Order of the Bath. He went on to be Commandant General Royal Marines in 1996 before retiring in 1998.

== Later life ==
In retirement Pennefather became Secretary of the Royal Humane Society, and a director of the Royal Naval Museum in Portsmouth.

Military offices
Preceded by Sir Robin Ross	Commandant General Royal Marines; 1996–1998	Succeeded by Robert Fulton
