= Henry Beverley =

Royal Marines general

Lieutenant General Sir Henry Beverley KCB OBE
- Born: 25 October 1935 (age 90)
- Military career
- Allegiance: United Kingdom
- Branch: Royal Marines
- Service years: 1953–1994
- Rank: Lieutenant General
- Commands: Commandant General Royal Marines; 3 Commando Brigade; Commando Training Centre Royal Marines; 42 Commando
- Conflicts: Cyprus Emergency
- Awards: Knight Commander of the Order of the Bath; Officer of the Order of the British Empire

Lieutenant General Sir Henry York La Roche Beverley, KCB, OBE (born 25 October 1935) is a retired Royal Marines officer who served as Commandant General Royal Marines from 1990 to 1994.

== Military career ==
The son of Vice Admiral Sir York Beverley, he was educated at Wellington College. Beverley joined the Royal Marines in 1953 and saw active service in Cyprus during the Cyprus Emergency, before becoming aide-de-camp to the Governor-General of New Zealand in 1961. He was appointed commanding officer of 42 Commando in 1978, commandant of the Commando Training Centre Royal Marines in 1980 and Director of Royal Marines personnel at the Ministry of Defence in 1982. He went on to be commander of 3 Commando Brigade in 1984, Major General, Training and Reserve Forces Royal Marines in 1986, and Chief of Staff to the Commandant General Royal Marines in 1988. His last appointment was as Commandant General Royal Marines in 1990 before retiring in 1994.

In retirement Beverley became Chairman of the Winston Churchill Memorial Trust and Chairman of Trustees of the Royal Marines Museum.

== Family ==
In 1963 Beverley married Sally Anne Maclean; they have two daughters.

Military offices
Preceded by Sir Martin Garrod	Commandant General Royal Marines; 1990–1994	Succeeded by Sir Robin Ross
