= 47 Commando (Raiding Group) =

Amphibious raiding formation of the Royal Marines

47 Commando (Raiding Group) Royal Marines
- Unit badge
- Active: 1943 - 1946; 2001 - present
- Country: United Kingdom
- Branch: Royal Marines; Naval Service
- Type: Commando
- Role: Direct action Raiding; Small boat operations Reconnaissance; Amphibious warfare Coxwains; Naval boarding
- Part of: United Kingdom Commando Force
- Garrison/HQ: RM Tamar
- Nicknames: Royals; Bootnecks; The Commandos; Jollies
- Motto: Per Mare Per Terram (By Sea By Land) (Latin)
- March: Quick - A Life on the Ocean Wave; Slow - n/a

Commanders
- Current Commander: Colonel Richard J Maltby RM
- Captain-General: The King

Insignia
- Commando Flash

47 Commando (Raiding Group) Royal Marines, formerly 1 Assault Group Royal Marines, is one of the commando units of Royal Marines that specialise in air assault operations, amphibious and coastal raiding with commando styles, forward air control, irregular warfare, long-range penetration, naval boarding, operating in a variety of terrain conditions, riverine warfare as well as small boat operations, and special reconnaissance. The unit falls under United Kingdom Commando Force (UKCF). In addition, it trains personnel for the Assault Squadrons of the Royal Marines (ASRM) and their landing craft detachments. It is based at RM Tamar in HMNB Devonport in Plymouth.

== History ==
47 Commando was initially formed as 1 Assault Group Royal Marines (1 AGRM) at RM Poole in October 2001 to take responsibility for landing craft training. It moved to RM Tamar in August 2013.

On 5 November 2019 the unit was renamed 47 Commando (Raiding Group) Royal Marines, reviving the name of the original No. 47 (Royal Marine) Commando that served between 1943 and 1946.

In 2026, the Royal Navy acquired around 20 K-3 Scout USVs for operation with the Surface Flotilla, principally the Coastal Forces Squadron and 47 Commando.

== Squadrons ==
The unit has its headquarters at RM Tamar in HMNB Devonport, Plymouth.

Training is delivered at two sites:

- 10 Squadron at RM Tamar, deliver all vocational Landing Craft and amphibious assault with commando style raids training to Royal Marine personnel.
- 11 Squadron based at RM Instow in North Devon, deliver all amphibious assault support training, including waterproofing courses, to Commando Brigade units.

Operations are delivered by the following units:

- Logistics Squadron provide support and enable all unit activity.
- 539 Assault Squadron Royal Marines is UK Commando Force's integrated landing craft unit.

47 Commando (Raiding Group) Royal Marines equipment includes：Landing Craft Utility, Landing Craft Vehicle/Personnel, Offshore Raiding Craft, Commando Raiding Craft, Landing Craft Air Cushion (Light) and Inflatable Raiding Craft.

== Training ==
10 Squadron provide training accredited by the Royal Yachting Association for candidates to the landing craft specialisation. This training is delivered at various stages in the individual's career:

- LC3 at entry to the specialisation as a Marine.
- LC2 at promotion to Corporal.
- LC1 at promotion to Sergeant.

== See also ==
- British Armed Forces
- Royal Navy
- List of active Royal Marines military watercraft
