= André Hue =

Anglo-French businessman, soldier and spy

André Hunter Alfred Hue
- Born: 7 December 1923; Swansea, Glamorgan, Wales, United Kingdom
- Died: 11 January 2005 (aged 81); Chichester, Sussex, England, United Kingdom
- Occupations: Soldier, spy, diplomat, businessman.
- Years active: 1940-1990
- Known for: Work with the Special Operations Executive
- Notable work: The Next Moon (2004)

André Hunter Alfred Hue (7 December 1923 – 11 January 2005) was an Anglo-French businessman, soldier and spy best remembered for his work as an operative with the Special Operations Executive (SOE) in France and Burma during World War II.

== Early life ==
Hue was born in Swansea, Wales to a French father and Welsh mother. Hue's father, also named André, was a World War I veteran who had been badly wounded, having taken a bullet in his head, which remained there until his early death in 1938. The elder Hue served as an officer in the French merchant marine who worked on a ship taking coal from Swansea to Le Havre while his wife Caroline Hunter did not speak French, but insisted their children be brought up knowing French. Fluent in both English and French, Hue grew up in Le Havre. Without a father to support him, Hue was working as a sailor in the French merchant marine by 1939.

== In the Resistance ==
On 17 June 1940, the SS Champlain, the ship Hue was working on as a purser struck a mine off La Rochelle and sank, forcing Hue who was taking a shower at the time to swim ashore naked. Without a family in France, Hue ended up working as a railroad clerk in the town of Guer in Brittany, where he was recruited into the French Resistance by François Vallée of the SOE "Parson" circuit. Hue knew Vallée only by his codename Oscar. The railroad station at Guer was a key transport point for supplying German troops in north western France.

Hue provided information about the railroad time tables so the Royal Air Force could target trains carrying German troops and supplies. Vallée advised Hue against committing sabotage, warning that too many innocent people would die if the Germans discovered sabotage. Afterwards, Hue become involved in smuggling Allied airmen shot down over France. When Hue insisted on forming a group of his own committed to sabotage, someone talked of his plans, and an order for his arrest was issued. Having proved his courage and his trustworthiness, Hue was asked if he would like to become a SOE agent himself. In February 1944 he crossed the English Channel to Britain, so he could join the SOE. Hue crossed the Channel in MGB 502. Hue's training reports called him "a very active, energetic, enthusiastic man with a reasonably stable personality, although inclined to excitement at times". Hue was given the rank of acting captain just before Operation Overlord.

After passing courses that taught him combat, sabotage and parachuting, Hue parachuted into France on the night of 5 June 1944 together with a number of men from the French Special Air Service (SAS) regiment. The 3rd and 4th Battalions of the SAS in 1944 were all French. On 6 June 1944, the Allies began Operation Overlord, the liberation of France, by landing in Normandy and Hue's task in Brittany were to keep the German forces there preoccupied. Much to his surprise, Hue found himself having to dodge Cossacks that were patrolling in the countryside. The Cossacks were from the Ostlegionen (Eastern Legions) of the Wehrmacht as Soviet POWs who joined the German Army were known. In 1944, owing to heavy losses, about one-fifth of the Wehrmacht forces in France were the Ostlegionen. Hue during his jump had become separated from his men, and it would require an entire night of walking before he was to join up with them. Hue described the Cossacks as ruthless opponents who despite riding horses moved very swiftly across the Breton countryside, and were equally adept at firing their guns while mounted and with using their shashkas (the distinctive sword used by the Cossacks that could easily smash a head with one blow). There were four German divisions stationed in Brittany, and Hue's orders were to organise the marquis to stage guerrilla attacks and to destroy communications such as railroads and roads in order to keep the four enemy divisions in Brittany from joining the rest in Normandy. The total Les Forces Francaises de l'Interieur in Brittany numbered about 20,000 lightly armed guerrillas.

As a SOE agent, Hue's tasks were to ensure the delivery of supplies from the SOE to the maquis and to co-ordinate operations between the French SAS team and the resistance. Hue who was attached to the Hillbilly circuit (network) in Brittany later remembered that arranging supply drops to the resistance took up most of his time while attempting to evade the Wehrmacht, the SS and the Milice. This was highly dangerous work, and Hue was frequently involved in fighting with the German forces, during which he showed great courage, resourcefulness, and an ability to keep calm. Hue later recalled of the disconnect between being in the "glorious French countryside" in June and having to face death constantly.

The British historian Max Hastings in review of Hue's memoir The Next Moon wrote:

The Germans reacted with their usual energy, especially in Brittany where the SAS were relatively close to the fighting front. The civilian population suffered terribly, both in the fighting and from subsequent reprisals. Maquisards with Sten guns, even supported by a few paratroopers, were hopelessly outmatched by enemy forces with vehicles and heavy weapons. Hue and most of his comrades spent much of their time in France running away from the Germans, not because they were cowardly, but because this was the only realistic option. They had been thrown into an almighty mess.

Hue's base was at farmhouse outside of Saint Marcel, where Hue had planes from Britain land during the night to bring in supplies.

Hue noted in his book The Next Moon that he feared the Milice much more than the Germans because the Milice being French could always notice anybody whose accent did not sound entirely French and the regional accents; Hue's Norman French stood out in Brittany. Hue wrote he been selected for this job because "The men they wanted to organise and coordinate this phase of the war had to be from that rare breed, Englishmen who spoke French as their primary language." On one occasion, the Germans captured and shot 5 SAS men together with 17 French civilians while Hue was only 50 yards away and on another occasion, Hue was trapped in a barn which was set on fire by the Germans, and from which he managed to escape. Unlike the SAS, Hue wore civilian clothes and had to be careful not to be seen talking to the SAS too much in public. Hue also noted the grim moral arithmetic of his work, as the more attacks he staged against German forces, the more innocent French civilians were shot in reprisal. Hue described his enemy as utterly ruthless in the pursuit of his forces, recalling: "Women were being raped then shot in front of their husbands, fathers, and children; and if was not that way around, then fathers were shot in front of their women, but only after the women had been publicly raped". Despite all of the stress, Hue found the time to take a lover in form of Geneviève Pondard, with whom he had to hide with in the hay while the Germans searched the barn, trying their best to remain still.

On 18 June 1944, Hue's base at the farmhouse, which was defended by about 4, 000 Maquisards was attacked by the Germans. Hue had the farmer, Pondard and his family escape into the forest first as they would have been executed for sheltering maquisards had they been captured. Hue who was leading a maquis band in Brittany later recalled about the Battle of Saint Marcel as the firefight at a farmhouse is known:

Now every weapon that the enemy possessed was brought to bear on our front line in a cacophony of shots and explosions which could not drown an even more sinister noise: the occasional crack of a single bullet. A man within feet of me slumped to the ground with blood spurting two feet into the air from the side of his neck...We had anticipated an infantry assault-possibly backed up with light armour - but snipers, a threat we had not met before, were difficult to counter. Within minutes of the first casualty, another seven of our men lay dying within the farm complex: all had been shot from long range.

As the snipers continued to cut down his men while he could hear the sound of panzers coming up in the distance, Hue ordered his men to retreat into the woods under the cover of darkness. Hue was able to use his radio to call in a RAF airstrike on the German tanks, which disorganized the Wehrmacht enough so he and his men could escape into the forest. Summarizing up the Battle of Saint Marcel, Hue wrote:

The majority of the younger men had never been in battle, and seeing their friends' brains and guts oozing on to the grass and mud made them sick in the head and stomach. Just as terrifying to the young Frenchmen was the sight of those who were wounded and who yet had to die without help. I was not surprised that so many had enough. I was perhaps astonished that the number of defectors were so low.

At the Battle of Saint Marcel, the maquisards lost about 60 dead. After the commander of the French SAS company was killed, Hue took command. Through the losses endured by the maquisards and even more so by the French population were heavy, Hue's activities in Brittany helped to slow down the movement of German forces from Brittany into Normandy.

In August 1944, Hue helped execute an operation where the SAS and the resistance took over most of the villages in Brittany to aid the advance of the Americans. After his work in Brittany, Hue parachuted again, to the town of Nevers in Burgundy, which he again co-ordinated operations between the SOE and the resistance. On 30 August 1944, Hue landed in the Nievre just west of Dijon to take command of the SOE Gondolier circuit. His principle duties were to train the maquisards, through he supervised the blowing up of three bridges in Burgundy to deny the retreat of German forces from the South of France. In the town of Luzy, he was involved in demining the town as the Germans left mines everywhere with the intention of killing and maiming as civilians as possible. Hue was awarded a Distinguished Service Order (DSO) for his work in France in 1943. At the age of 20, he was one of the youngest man ever awarded a DSO.

In January 1945, Hue arrived in Ceylon (modern Sri Lanka) to begin jungle training. In March 1945, Hue parachuted behind Japanese lines in Burma, where he organised supply drops from the SOE to anti-Japanese guerrillas and led attacks against Japanese forces. When Hue landed in Burma, the Japanese attacked the landing zone, forcing Hue to spend 29 days in the jungle before he was able to join up with the resistance. Hue in a report was very critical of SOE's security in Burma, writing the Japanese should never had been allowed to ambush the landing zone.

== After the war: spy and businessman ==
At the end of World War II, Hue held the rank of major in the British Army. In January 1946, Hue was made a Chevalier of the Legion of Honour and awarded the Croix de Guerre by the French republic. Hue served in the Palestine Mandate during the last years of British rule, and afterwards he served in Cyprus. In 1954–55, he served as the British military attaché in Cambodia, during which time he met his future wife Maureen Taylor who worked in the British embassy in Phnom Penh as a secretary. Cambodia had been a French protectorate, and the Khmer elite all spoke French while the British Army did not have many officers fluent in Khmer.

In 1957, Hue married Taylor and had one daughter by her. Hue worked for MI6, the British intelligence service in the Far East. After leaving MI6 in 1967, Hue worked for the British-American Tobacco company in Paraguay, Senegal, and Malawi before having a successful career as a businessman in France. In 1980, Hue moved to the town of Chichester in Sussex, where he was served as member of the town council where he was known for pressing for municipal improvements. Hue spent much of the 1990s writing his memoir The Next Moon with the writer and former Royal Marine Ewen Southby-Tailyour recounting his service with the SOE, which was published in 2004. In his last years, Hue suffered from Alzheimer's disease, which killed him in 2005. His wife placed a copy of The Next Moon to him on his hospital bed, hoping that it would remind him of who he was during his final months.
