= Robin Ross (Royal Marines officer) =

Royal Marines Lieutenant General (1939–2025)

Lieutenant General Sir Robin Ross KCB OBE
- Born: 28 November 1939
- Died: 29 July 2025 (aged 85)
- Military career
- Allegiance: United Kingdom
- Branch: Royal Marines
- Service years: 1957–1996
- Rank: Lieutenant General
- Commands: Commandant General Royal Marines; 3 Commando Brigade; 40 Commando
- Conflicts: Operation Safe Haven
- Awards: Knight Commander of the Order of the Bath; Officer of the Order of the British Empire; Officer of the Legion of Merit (United States); Decoration of Merit (Netherlands)

Lieutenant General Sir Robert Jeremy Ross, KCB, OBE (28 November 1939 – 29 July 2025) was a Royal Marines officer who served as Commandant General Royal Marines from 1994 to 1996.

== Military career ==
Educated at Wellington College and Corpus Christi College, Cambridge, Ross joined the Royal Marines in 1957. He became commanding officer of 40 Commando in 1979, commander of 3 Commando Brigade in 1986 and commander, training and reserves in 1988. He was appointed commander, Commando Forces in 1990 and led an Anglo-Dutch force that took part in Operation Safe Haven, a humanitarian operation to protect the Kurdish people in Northern Iraq in 1991. He became Commandant General Royal Marines in 1994 and retired in 1996.

== Personal life and death ==
In 1965 Ross married Sara Curtis; they had one son and one daughter.

Upon retirement Ross became Chairman of SSAFA Forces Help, a member of the International Investment Council of South Africa and a churchwarden of St John the Baptist Church at Berwick St John in Wiltshire.

Ross died from complications of Parkinson's disease on 29 July 2025, at the age of 85.

Military offices
Preceded by Sir Henry Beverley	Commandant General Royal Marines; 1994–1996	Succeeded by David Pennefather
