= RM Tamar =

Royal Marines base in Devon, England

RM Tamar
- Near Plymouth in England
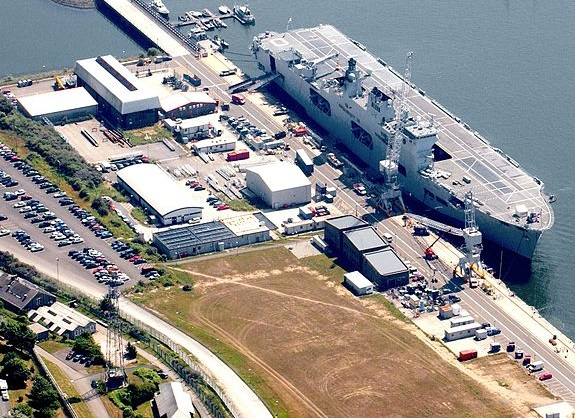
- RM Tamar (on the left) with the amphibious assault ship HMS Ocean docked alongside

Site information
- Type: Royal Marines Base
- Owner: Ministry of Defence
- Operator: Royal Navy
- Controlled by: Royal Marines
- Condition: Operational
- Website: RM Tamar - Royal Navy

Location
- Shown within Devon RM Tamar (the United Kingdom)
- Coordinates: 50.39318°N 4.19132°W

Site history
- Built: 2013
- Built for: Ministry of Defence
- In use: 2013 - Present

Garrison information
- Occupants: 47 Commando (Raiding Group) Royal Marines; 539 Raiding Squadron; 10 (Landing Craft) Training Squadron

Royal Marines Tamar or more commonly RM Tamar, is a Royal Marines military installation specialising in landing craft training and operations located on the northern bank of Weston Mill Lake at the north end of HMNB Devonport at Plymouth in Devon.

== History ==
Weston Mill Lake (at one time Devonport's coaling yard) was converted in the 1980s to provide frigate berths for the Type 22 fleet. After the Type 22 fleet had been decommissioned and the lake had been re-designated the base for its amphibious warfare ships, the Royal Navy decided to create a centre of excellence for landing craft, hovercraft and fast boats there: the centre, which handles both training and operations, was opened by Prince Harry on 2 August 2013.

47 Commando (Raiding Group) Royal Marines and its training unit, 10 (Landing Craft) Training Squadron, moved from RM Poole to RM Tamar at that time and 539 Assault Squadron RM, which undertakes operations for 1 Assault Group, moved from RM Turnchapel to RM Tamar.
