= Michael Wilkins (Royal Marines officer) =

Lieutenant-General Sir Michael Wilkins KCB OBE
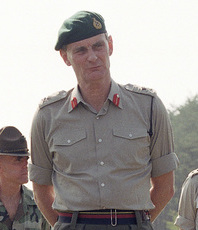
- Lieutenant General Wilkins in 1986
- Born: 4 January 1933
- Died: 25 April 1994 (aged 61)
- Military career
- Allegiance: United Kingdom
- Branch: Royal Marines
- Service years: 1951–1987
- Rank: Lieutenant-General
- Commands: Commandant General Royal Marines; 3 Commando Brigade; 40 Commando
- Conflicts: Cyprus Emergency; Indonesia–Malaysia confrontation The Troubles
- Awards: Knight Commander of the Order of the Bath; Officer of the Order of the British Empire

Lieutenant-General Sir Michael Compton Lockwood Wilkins, KCB, OBE (4 January 1933 – 25 April 1994) was a senior Royal Marines officer who served as Lieutenant Governor of Guernsey from 1990 to 1994.

== Military career ==
Wilkins joined the Royal Marines in 1951. He was appointed Commander of 3 Commando Brigade in 1979, Chief of Staff of the Royal Marines in 1981 (a post he held during the Falklands War and during which he was Acting Commandant General following the attack on Lieutenant General Sir Steuart Pringle), and Commander of Commando Forces in 1982. He went on to be Commandant General Royal Marines in 1984 before retiring in 1987. In retirement he became Lieutenant Governor of Guernsey and died in office.

Wilkins lived at Coombe Hill in Devon.

Military offices
Preceded by Sir Steuart Pringle	Commandant General Royal Marines; 1985–1987	Succeeded by Sir Martin Garrod
Government offices
Preceded by Sir Alexander Boswell	Lieutenant Governor of Guernsey; 1990–1994	Succeeded by Sir John Coward
