= RM Instow =

Royal Marines base in Devon, England

RM Instow
- Located near Instow in Devon
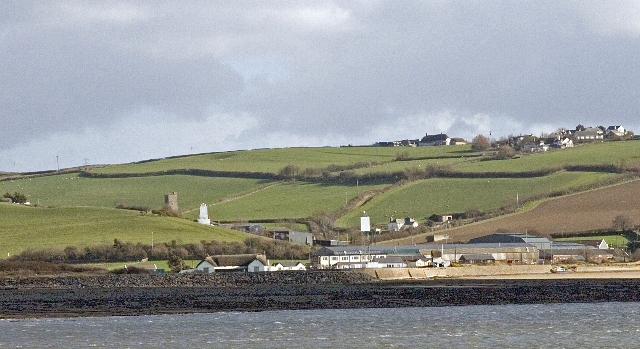
- Royal Marines Base, Instow

Site information
- Type: Royal Marines Barracks
- Owner: Ministry of Defence
- Operator: Royal Navy
- Controlled by: Royal Marines
- Condition: Operational

Location
- Location within Devon RM Instow (the United Kingdom)
- Coordinates: 51.05815°N 4.17588°W

Site history
- Built: 1939
- Built for: Admiralty
- In use: 1939-Present

Garrison information
- Occupants: 11 Amphibious Trials and Training Squadron

RM Instow, also known as Arromanches Camp, is a military installation operated by the Royal Marines at Instow in North Devon located 5.2 miles (8.4 km) south west of Barnstaple, Devon, and 3.2 miles (5.1 km) north east of Bideford, Devon, England.

== History ==
The site, which was established in 1939, was used as a training facility for troops preparing for the Normandy landings at Arromanches on Gold Beach in June 1944 during the Second World War. In the 1970s the towns of Instow and Arromanches instigated an arrangement whereby families visited each other's town every other year staying with a host family.

== Operations ==
The site is split into two different areas, firstly the camp where the workshops and accommodation are located and secondly the beach located 1.2 miles (1.9 km) south-west which is where the main landing craft are based. The site is occupied by 11 Amphibious Trials and Training Squadron and the Amphibious Trials and Development Wing (ATDW), both of which are part of 47 Commando (Raiding Group), which carries out training for operations which include disembarking from landing craft, wading across a water gap of up to 1.5 m (4 ft 11 in) in depth, an activity known as fording, and arriving at a beachhead. The site is also used for trialling new landing craft: the Royal Marines have been moving away from the use of flat-bottomed landing craft or DUKWs to armed powerboats. The site is available for filming.
