= 539 Raiding Squadron RM =

539 Raiding Squadron
- Cap Badge of the Royal Marines
- Active: 1984-Present
- Country: United Kingdom
- Branch: Royal Marines; Naval Service
- Type: Marines; Commando; Light infantry
- Role: Amphibious support
- Size: ~ 100 personnel
- Part of: 47 Commando (Raiding Group) Royal Marines
- Garrison/HQ: RM Tamar, Plymouth
- Nicknames: The Royals; HM Jollies; Bootnecks; The Royal Machines
- Motto: Per Mare Per Terram (By Sea By Land) (Latin)
- March: Quick - A Life on the Ocean Wave
- Equipment: Landing Craft Utility; Landing Craft Vehicle Personnel; Commando Raiding Craft; Offshore Raiding Craft; Inflatable Raiding Craft

Commanders
- Captain-General: King Charles III
- Commanding Officer: Colonel Will Norcott
- Squadron Commander: Major Joe Brown RM

539 Raiding Squadron (539 RS) is UK Commando Force's integral operational amphibious movement capability, delivering them on to land from water and patrolling waterways. It forms part of 47 Commando (Raiding Group) Royal Marines. The Squadron are based in the new Royal Marines Tamar complex at the northern end of HMNB Devonport.

== History ==
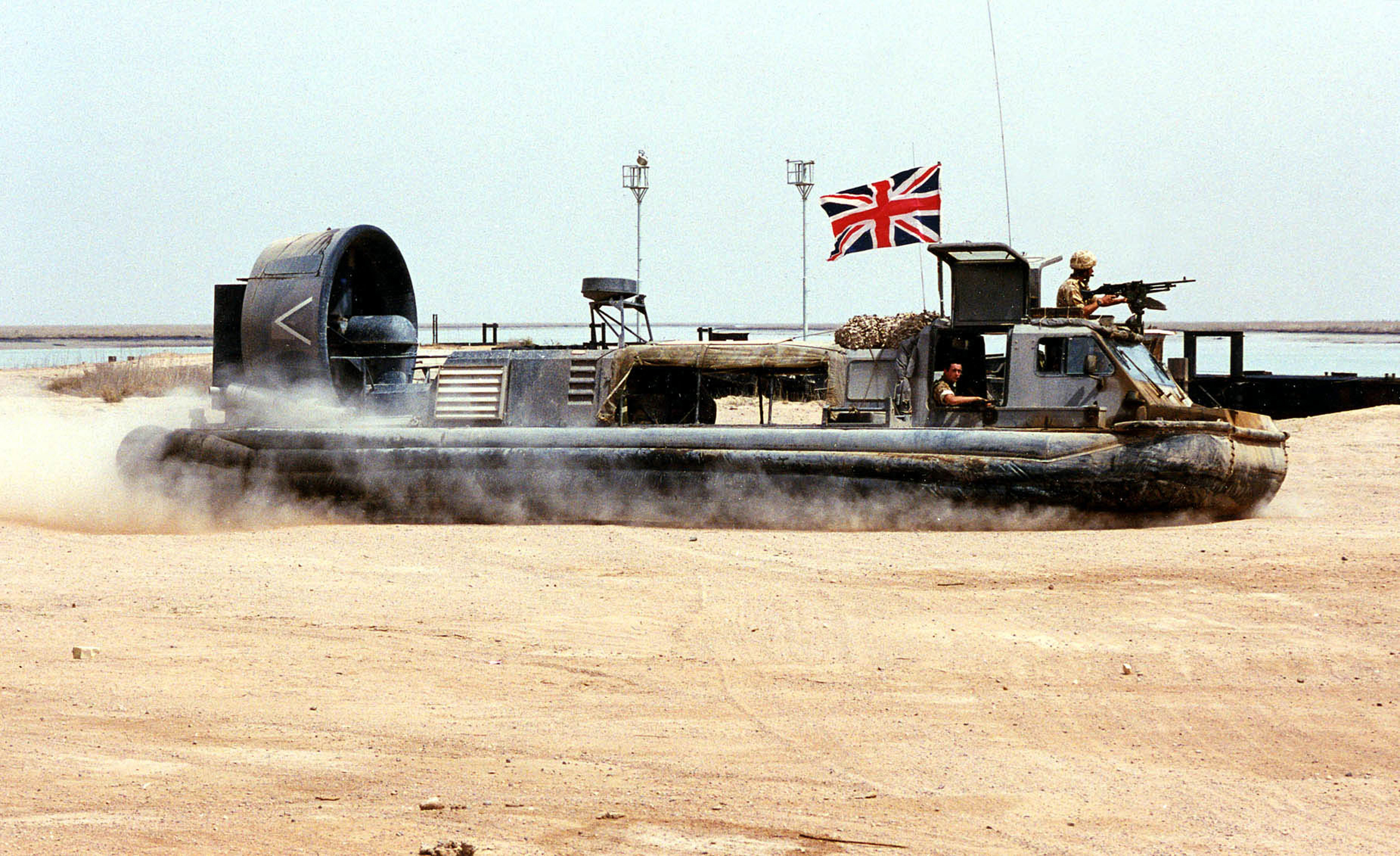
A 539 Assault Squadron Landing Craft Air Cushioned (hovercraft) during the 2003 Iraq War

539 Assault Squadron was formed from the previously named 1st Raiding Squadron Royal Marines (1RSRM) on 2 April 1984 and commissioned as operational on 24 July 1984. This was in direct response to lessons learned during previous winters in north Norway that were then subsequently confirmed during the Falklands Conflict in 1982. More recent operations include Operation Telic. 539 ASRM supported 3 Commando Brigade as it took the Al-Faw Peninsula, carrying out numerous operations such as several landings and the clearing of various waterways. 539 ASRM continued to operate in Iraq, performing security patrols of Iraq's southern ports and water networks until the end of Operation Telic.

In July 2011 the Squadron, as part of the Response Force Task Group (RFTG), took part in the Cougar 11 deployment, including Exercise Omani Cougar and Exercise Somaliland Cougar.

As of 2017, the Squadron consisted of over 100 personnel and was equipped with a variety of Landing Craft including Rigid Raiders and Landing Craft Vehicle/Personnel. 539 Assault Squadron was named after the famous 539 Assault Flotilla which landed on Gold Beach during the Invasion of Normandy.

On 5 November 2019 the unit was renamed 539 Raiding Squadron and is a Squadron within 47 Commando (Raiding Group) Royal Marines.
