= Peter Whiteley (Royal Marines officer) =

British Royal Marines officer (1920–2016)

General Sir Peter Whiteley GCB OBE DL
- Born: 13 December 1920; Stansted Mountfitchet, Essex
- Died: 2 February 2016 (aged 95)
- Military career
- Allegiance: United Kingdom
- Branch: Royal Marines
- Service years: 1941–1979
- Rank: General
- Commands: Allied Forces Northern Europe (1977–79); Commandant General Royal Marines (1975–77); 3 Commando Brigade (1968–70); 42 Commando (1965–66)
- Conflicts: Second World War; Malayan Emergency; Indonesia–Malaysia confrontation
- Awards: Knight Grand Cross of the Order of the Bath; Officer of the Order of the British Empire; Mentioned in Despatches

General Sir Peter John Frederick Whiteley, GCB, OBE, DL (13 December 1920 – 2 February 2016) was a British Royal Marines officer. He served as Commandant General Royal Marines from 1975 to 1977 and then as Commander-in-Chief Allied Forces Northern Europe from 1977 to 1979.

Gen Sir Peter Whiteley with his pet bear

== Early life ==
Whiteley was born on 13 December 1920 in Stansted Mountfitchet, Essex. He was educated at Bishop's Stortford College, then an all-boys private school in Bishop's Stortford, Hertfordshire, and at Bembridge School, a now closed all-boys independent school on the Isle of Wight.

Whiteley was awarded a Newspaper Proprietors' Association scholarship to study at the University of London. However, with the outbreak of the Second World War, he decided to join the military rather than continue his studies.

== Military career ==
At the outbreak of the Second World War, Whiteley volunteered for the Royal Air Force. However, his application was rejected due to his poor eyesight. He then applied to the Royal Marines and was accepted, and he began his officer training. He was commissioned as a probationary second lieutenant on 1 January 1940. On 20 March 1942, his commission was confirmed and he was given the rank of lieutenant with seniority from 14 June 1941. During the war, he served aboard HMS Resolution, a battleship, and aboard HMS Gambia, a light cruiser. During the latter part of the war, he served with the British Pacific Fleet, which was fighting against the Japanese. He could claim to have fired some of the last shots of the war: on 15 August 1945, during an attack by a Japanese aircraft on his ship, he was attempting to shoot it down when the news of the ceasefire with Japan was received.

Whiteley was selected to become commanding officer of 42 Commando in 1965. He was then appointed commander of 3 Commando Brigade in 1968. He became Commandant General Royal Marines in 1975, was promoted to full general on 17 January 1977, and became Commander-in-Chief Allied Forces Northern Europe in 1977.

== Later life ==
Whiteley served as Lieutenant Governor of Jersey from 1979 to 1984, and was Deputy Lieutenant of Devon.

Whiteley died on 2 February 2016.

Military offices
Preceded by Sir Ian Gourlay	Commandant General Royal Marines; 1975–1977	Succeeded by Sir John Richards
Preceded by Sir John Sharp	Commander-in-Chief of Allied Forces Northern Europe; 1977–1979	Succeeded by Sir Anthony Farrar-Hockley
Government offices
Preceded by Sir Desmond Fitzpatrick	Lieutenant Governor of Jersey; 1979–1985	Succeeded by Sir William Pillar
