= Jerry Ovens =

Royal Navy commander

Commander Jerry Ovens
- Born: 1959 (age 66–67); England
- Alma mater: University of Bristol; Royal Naval College, Greenwich
- Spouse: Sandra Mann
- Children: 2
- Relatives: Patrick John Ovens (father)
- Military career
- Allegiance: United Kingdom
- Branch: Royal Navy
- Rank: Commander
- Commands: 706 Naval Air Squadron; RNAS Culdrose (HMS Seahawk)
- Awards: Queen’s Commendation for Valuable Service

Commander Jeremy John Ovens (born 1959) is a former Royal Navy officer and executive officer.

== Early life and education ==
Ovens was born in 1959 in England, the youngest of three children of Patrick John Ovens, a distinguished Royal Marines major-general, and Margaret Mary White.

Ovens studied at the University of Bristol, where he gained a degree in aeronautical engineering.

== Career ==
Ovens joined the Royal Navy in 1978. He served in the Pacific, Atlantic, Caribbean, and Baltic in several of Her Majesty's Ships, including HMS Euryalus, HMS London, HMS Wolverton, and HMS Yarmouth. On 1 January 1983, he was promoted to the rank of lieutenant and began training as an observer in anti-submarine warfare at the Royal Navy airbase RNAS Culdrose. In 1985, he joined the Royal Navy Fleet Air Arm squadron 814 Naval Air Squadron, before serving as an instructor on 706 Naval Air Squadron, after which he then enrolled in the principal warfare officer course and was subsequently appointed to the destroyer HMS Cardiff.

In 1992, Ovens was appointed as the senior observer of 706 Naval Air Squadron and so returned to RNAS Culdrose. In 1994, he was appointed to the command of the hunt-class mine countermeasures vessel HMS Quorn. Following its service in Rosyth (where it was engaged in fishery protection), the ship was tasked with mine warfare training in the English Channel, from the naval base in Portsmouth.

In 1996, Ovens attended his final Royal Naval staff course at Greenwich's Royal Naval College. He was then appointed the operations officer of the aircraft carrier HMS Illustrious. It was under Oven's watch that Illustrious saw the Handover of Hong Kong. As operations officer, he also organised the training to take a GR7s RAF Harrier squadron from having never embarked on an aircraft carrier to engaging in night bombing raids over Iraq within the space of four weeks. In recognition, he was awarded the Queen’s Commendation for Valuable Service, a British military award for meritorious service in an operational theatre, on 6 November 1998.

In 1999, Ovens was promoted to the rank of commander and was appointed as a member of the Joint Services Command and Staff College's Directing Staff. He was then appointed as an instructor at the Tactical Training Group Atlantic, Virginia, where he was tasked with teaching United States Navy officers of all ranks how to operate with allied navies. The September 11 attacks happened four weeks into this role, increasing the urgency of such an excerise in preparation for the coming War on terror.

In 2004, Ovens was designated to the UK's Ministry of Defence, where he was tasked with monitoring the efficiency of the Aircraft Carrier Strike capability programme, which included the introduction of the Joint Strike Fighters, as well as any Aircraft Carriers necessary.

In 2009, Ovens was appointed the second-in-command of Royal Naval Air Station Culdrose. As commander and executive officer of Culdrose, he oversaw the olympic flame's arrival in preparations for the 2012 Summer Olympics: "We expect people to come out and celebrate in their own communities," he said, "Everyone is really excited about it." In 2016, he resigned as chairman of the Royal Navy Hang Gliding and Paragliding Association.

Ovens oversaw the Royal Navy Fleet Air Arm Degrees. He told the Fleet Air Arm Officers Association in 2017:

I have thoroughly enjoyed managing the Fleet Air Arm Military Aviation Academy. I realise how much work goes into getting your Wings or C of C, whether you are a Pilot, Observer, Aircrewman or Air Traffic Controller. All this hard work needs to be recognised. I am delighted that the OU agrees with us and awards our people’s hard work. Not only do you have a great career in the RN, you can leave with a degree, a qualification recognised by future employers too!

== Personal life ==
Ovens is married to Sandra Mann. Together, they have two children.
