= ABS Hovercraft =

British hovercraft manufacturer

- Type: Design and marketing of hovercraft
- Industry: Marine transport
- Founded: October 22, 1993; 33 years ago in Chandlers Ford, Hampshire, United Kingdom
- Headquarters: Chandlers Ford, United Kingdom
- Key people: Klaus Blum
- Products: Hovercraft
- Website: www.abs-hovercraft.com

ABS Hovercraft is a British hovercraft designer and producer, founded in the early 1990s in Chandlers Ford, Hampshire.

== History ==
ABS Hovercraft researched the introduction of new materials to innovate Hovercraft technology.

In 1993 ABS created the world's fastest recreational Hovercraft fully made from advanced composite materials.

In 1994 ABS launched the largest Hovercraft entirely made from advanced composite materials, called the ABS M-10, which was built by Vosper Thornycroft in Southampton. The M-10 crossed the English Channel and was the first hovercraft to circumnavigate the Baltic Sea during winter trials in 1994.

In 1995 the ABS M-10 was sold to a commercial operator, Eurosense, in Belgium as a replacement for an SR-N6 for use as a hydrographical survey vessel along the coastline off Zeebrugge. Other ABS M-10 hovercraft were sold as logistic supply vessels to the Sri Lanka Navy and to the Swedish Amphibious Corps, the latter built under licence by Kockums AB of Sweden.

In 1998 the then Prime Minister, Tony Blair, announced on television the Millennium Product award of the UK Design Council for the ABS M-10 Hovercraft.

== Models ==
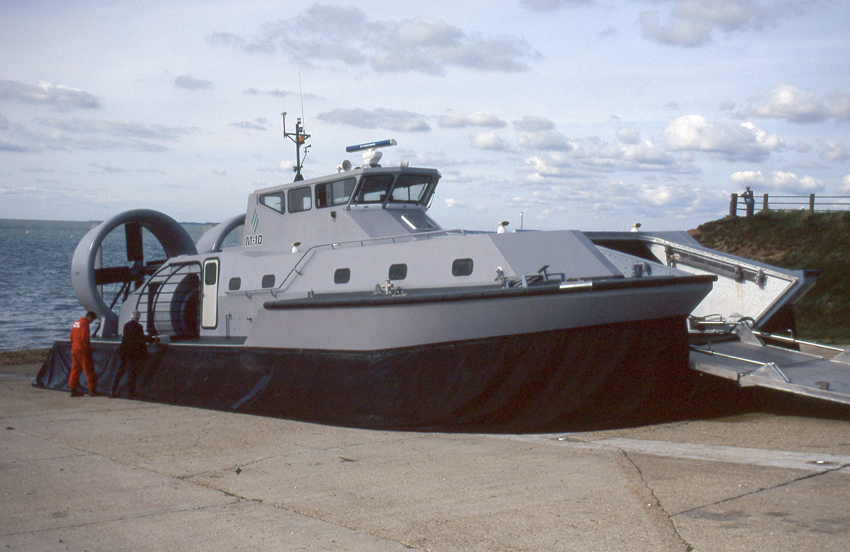
Prototype M-10 hovercraft at Lee on Solent on trials

So far, ABS has concentrated on larger hovercraft that can carry up to 100 passengers as a ferry or more than 10 tons of payload for military, paramilitary or commercial applications. Their vessels can be used as commercial ferry or for cargo operations, as a work boat or for logistic supply in arduous environments.

Their technology is licensed to a number of international shipyards. Currently the ABS M-10 is being built under licence by EPS Corporation of Tinton Falls, NJ as the "EPS M-10".

The EPS M-10 has the following specifications:

- Length: 20.6 m (68 ft)
- Beam: 8.8 m (29 ft)
- Cushion height: 1.0 m (3.3 ft)
- Max Payload: 10 tonnes (22,000 lb)
- Max Speed: 50 knots (93 km/h; 58 mph)
- Max Speed (fully laden): 40 knots (74 km/h; 46 mph)
- Range: up to 500 nmi

== See also ==
- British Hovercraft Corporation
- Cushioncraft
- Christopher Cockerell - Inventor of the Hovercraft
