= The Ovens, Nova Scotia =

The Ovens Natural Park, Nova Scotia
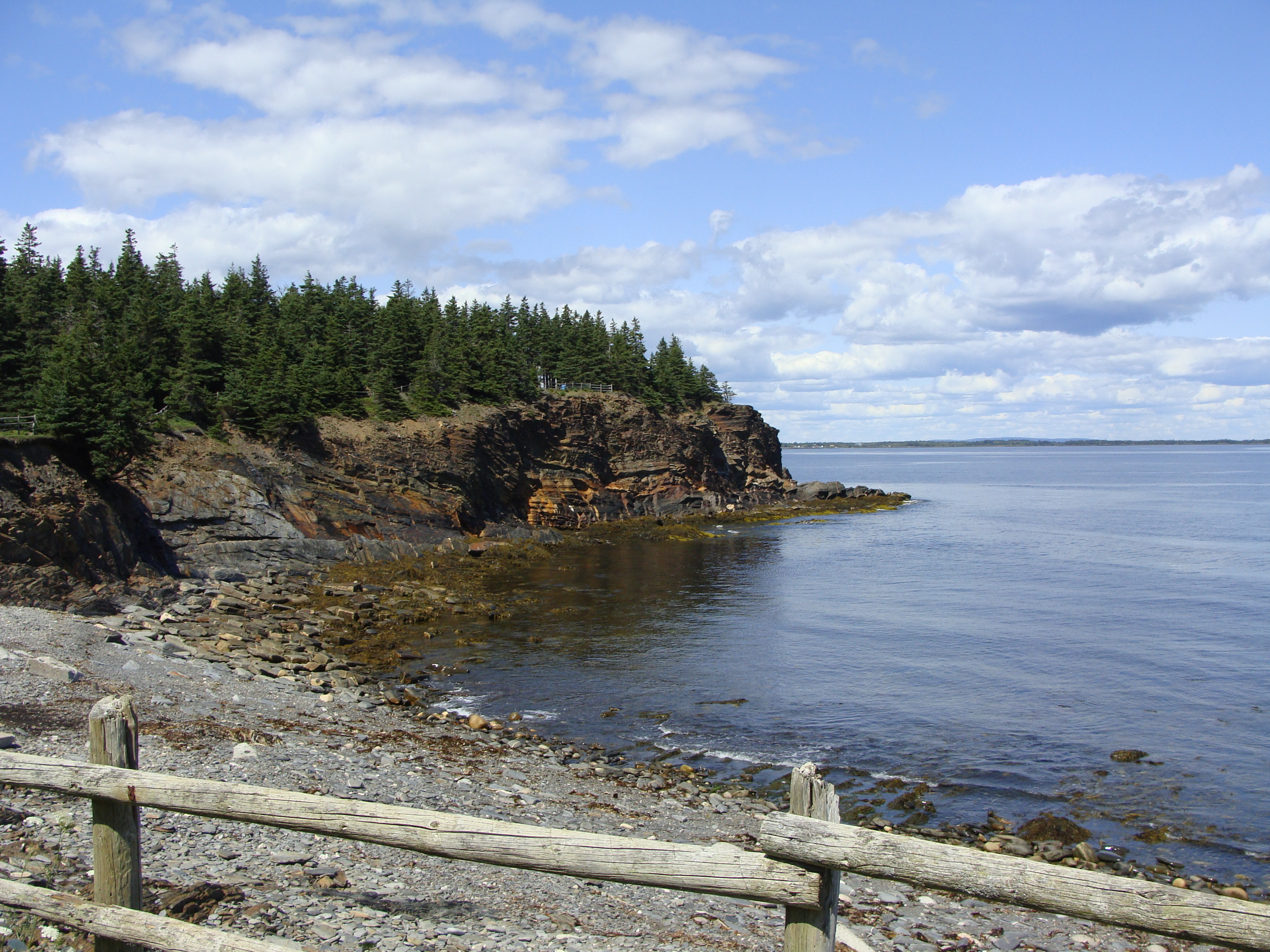
- The Ovens Natural Park

- Location within Nova Scotia
- Coordinates: 44°19′10.82″N 64°16′25.67″W
- Country: Canada
- Province: Nova Scotia
- Municipality: Lunenburg Municipality
- Elevation: 0 m (0 ft)
- Highest elevation: 119 m (390 ft)
- Lowest elevation: 0 m (0 ft)
- Time zone: UTC-4 (AST)
  - Summer (DST): UTC-3 (ADT)
- Canadian Postal code: B0J 2X0
- Area code: 902
- Telephone Exchanges: 764, 766
- NTS Map: 021A08
- GNBC Code: CBFUW
- Website: www.ovenspark.com

The Ovens Natural Park is a privately owned reserve of coastal forest in Feltzen South, located at the meeting point of Lunenburg and Rose Bay in Lunenburg County.

The Ovens is currently owned by Harry Chapin's brother, Steve and his wife, Angel Chapin, since the 1980s.

== Gallery ==
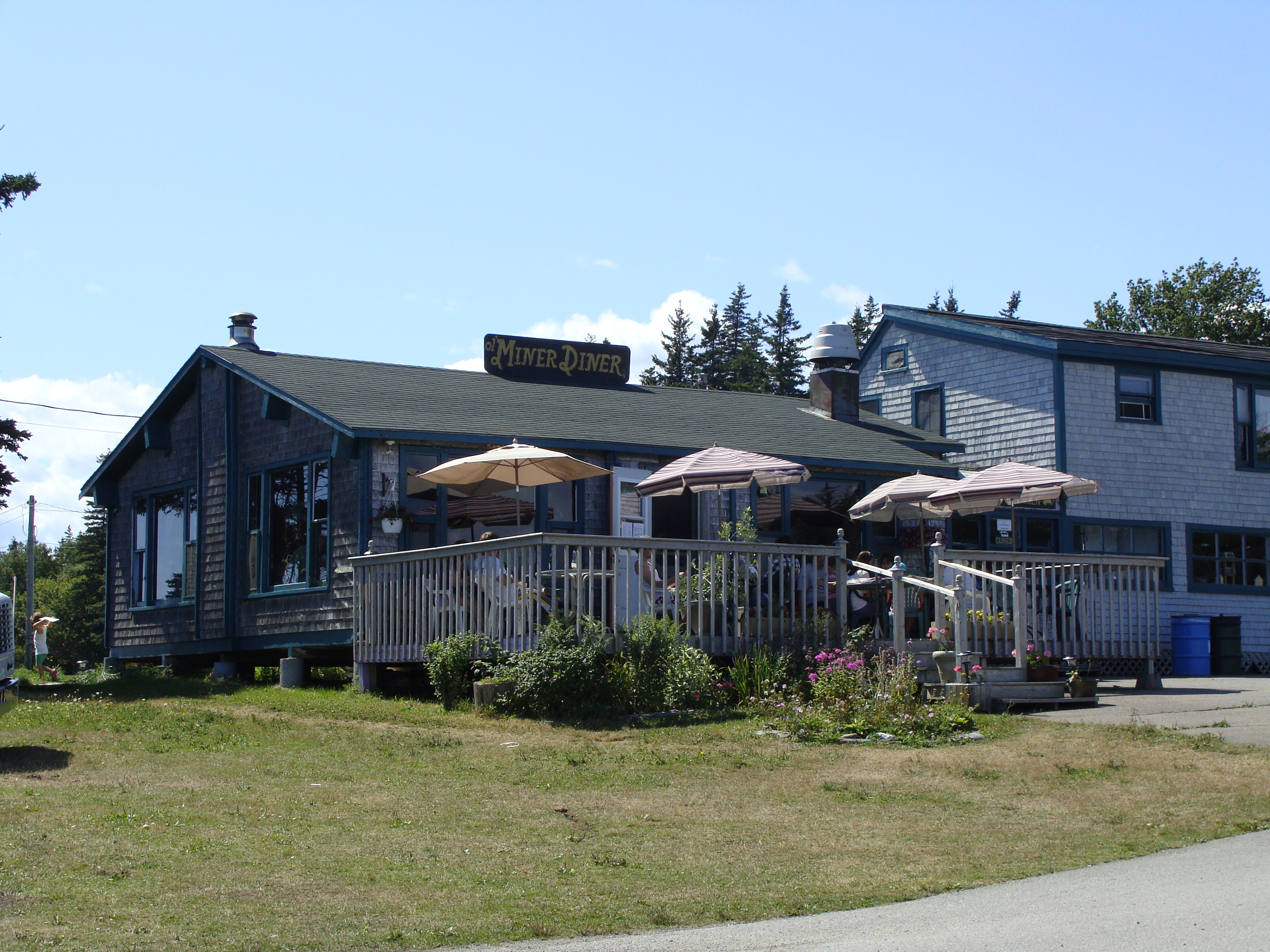
The Ol' Gold Miner Diner

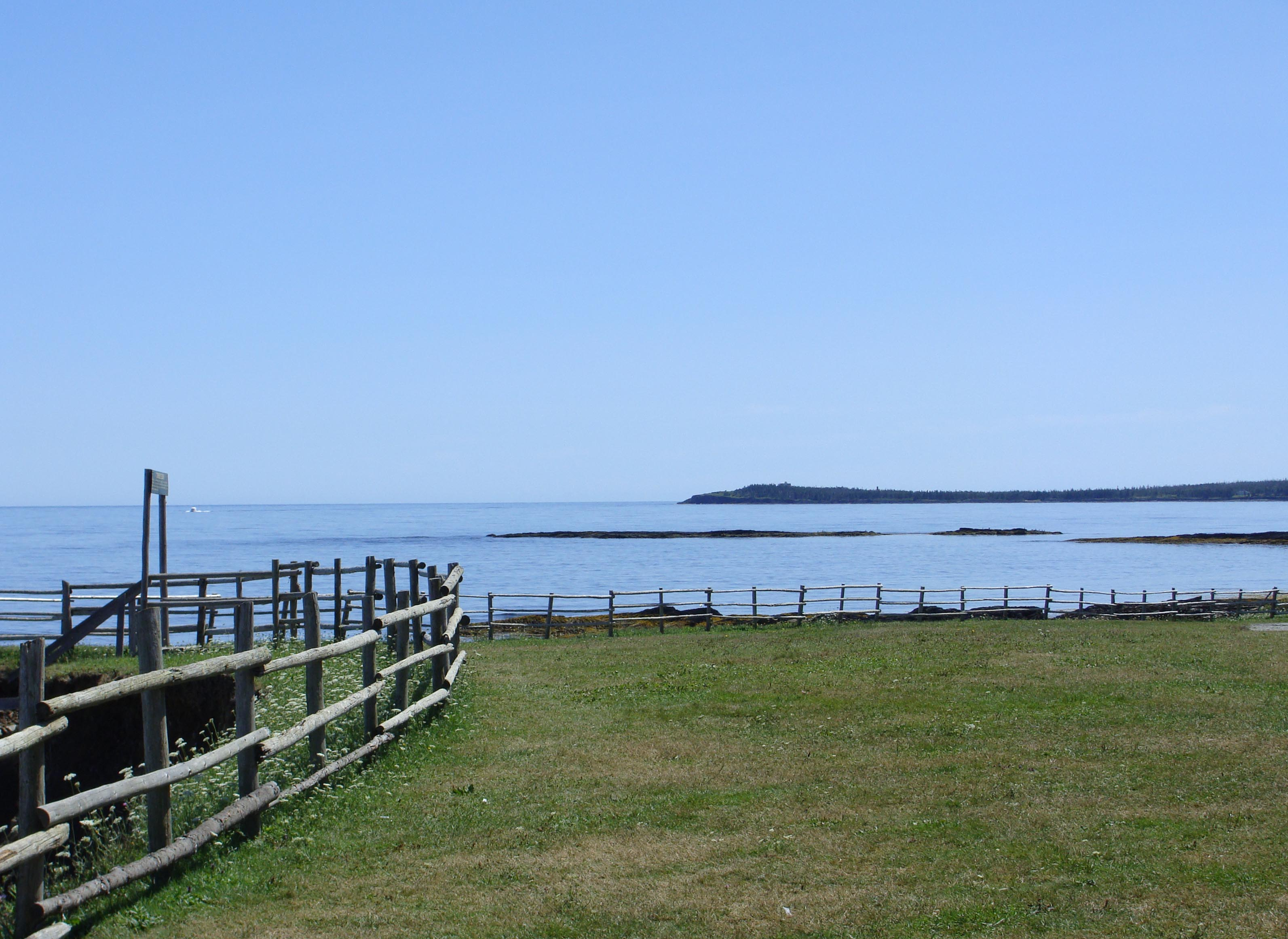
View of Rose Head, and stairs to Cunard Beach

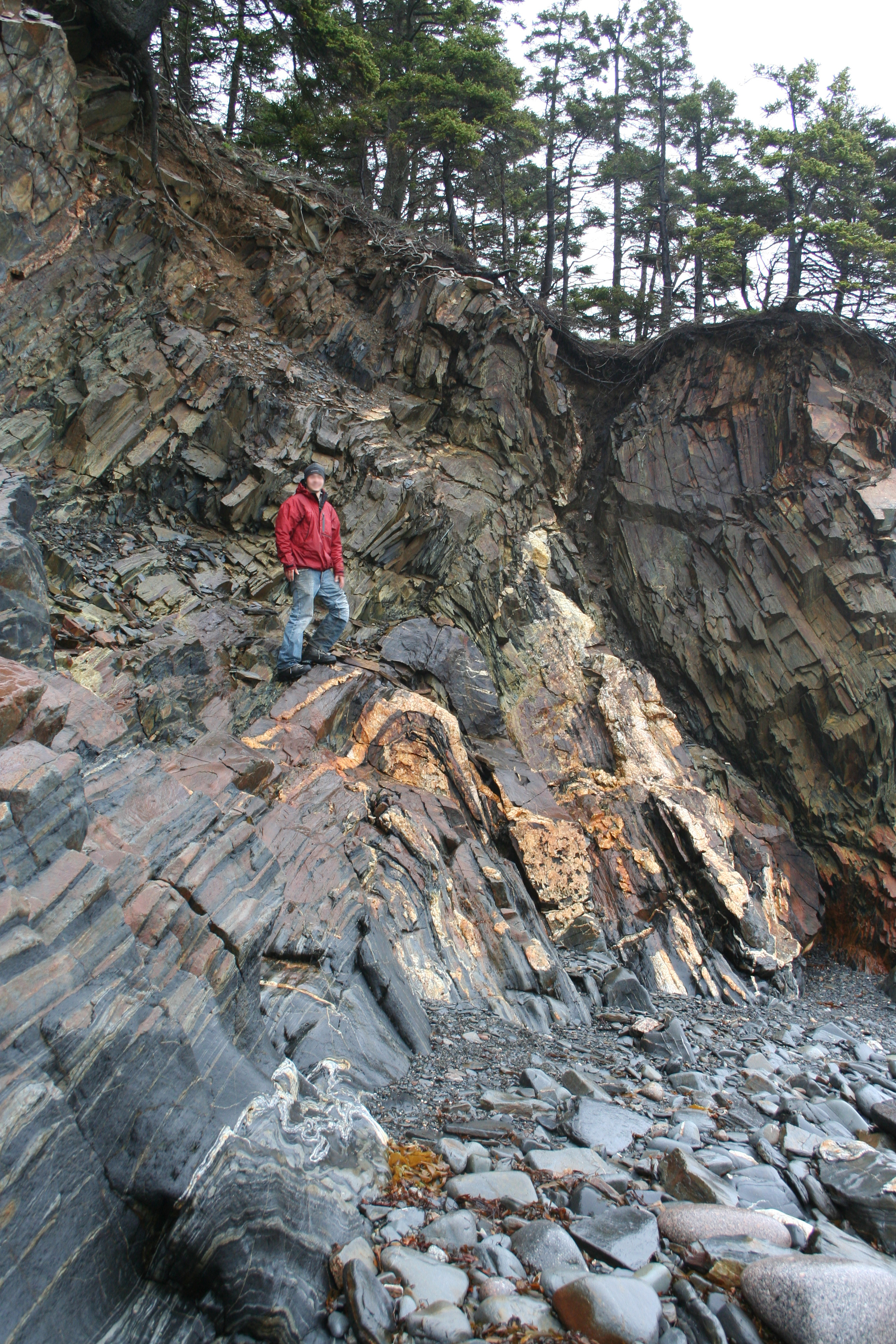
Folded rocks exposed along shore near western part of park
