= Martin Garrod =

British Royal Marines officer (1935–2009)

Lieutenant-General Sir Martin Garrod KCB CMG OBE DL
- Born: 29 May 1935; Darjeeling, India
- Died: 17 April 2009 (aged 73)
- Military career
- Allegiance: United Kingdom
- Branch: Royal Marines
- Service years: 1953–1990
- Rank: Lieutenant-General
- Commands: Commandant General Royal Marines; 3 Commando Brigade; 40 Commando
- Conflicts: Cyprus Emergency; Indonesia–Malaysia confrontation Operation Banner; Falklands War
- Awards: Knight Commander of the Order of the Bath; Companion of the Order of St Michael and St George; Officer of the Order of the British Empire; Mentioned in Despatches

Lieutenant-General Sir John Martin Carruthers Garrod (29 May 1935 – 17 April 2009) was a Royal Marines officer who served as Commandant General Royal Marines from 1987 to 1990.

== Military career ==
Educated at Sherwood College, Nainital in India and Sherborne School, Garrod joined the Royal Marines in 1953. He was deployed to Cyprus in 1955 and again in 1958 during the Cyprus Emergency. He was sent to Borneo during the Indonesia–Malaysia confrontation in the early 1960s and was deployed to Northern Ireland, where he was mentioned in despatches, in 1974 at the height of the Troubles. He was appointed commanding officer of 40 Commando in 1978 (in which role he was again deployed to Northern Ireland), Colonel General Staff to the Commandant General Royal Marines in 1980 (in which role he provided advice during the Falklands War), and commander of 3 Commando Brigade in 1983. He went on to be Chief of Staff to the Commandant General Royal Marines in 1984 before becoming Commandant General Royal Marines in 1987 and retiring in 1990.

In retirement Garrod became deputy director of the campaign for a referendum on the Maastricht Treaty and a member of the European Union Monitor Mission to Bosnia during the Bosnian War. He helped supervise a budget of DM300 million to repair war damage in the Mostar in 1993, became head of the Mostar regional Office of the High Representative for Bosnia and Herzegovina in 1997 and went on to be United Nations administrator in Mitrovica in Northern Kosovo in 1999. He was also a Deputy Lieutenant of Kent.

== Family ==
In 1963 Garrod married Gillian Mary Parks-Smith; they had two daughters. Lady Garrod died in November 2015.

Military offices
Preceded by Sir Michael Wilkins	Commandant General Royal Marines; 1987–1990	Succeeded by Sir Henry Beverley
