= HMS Sutherland (F81) =

1997 Type 23 or Duke-class frigate of the Royal Navy

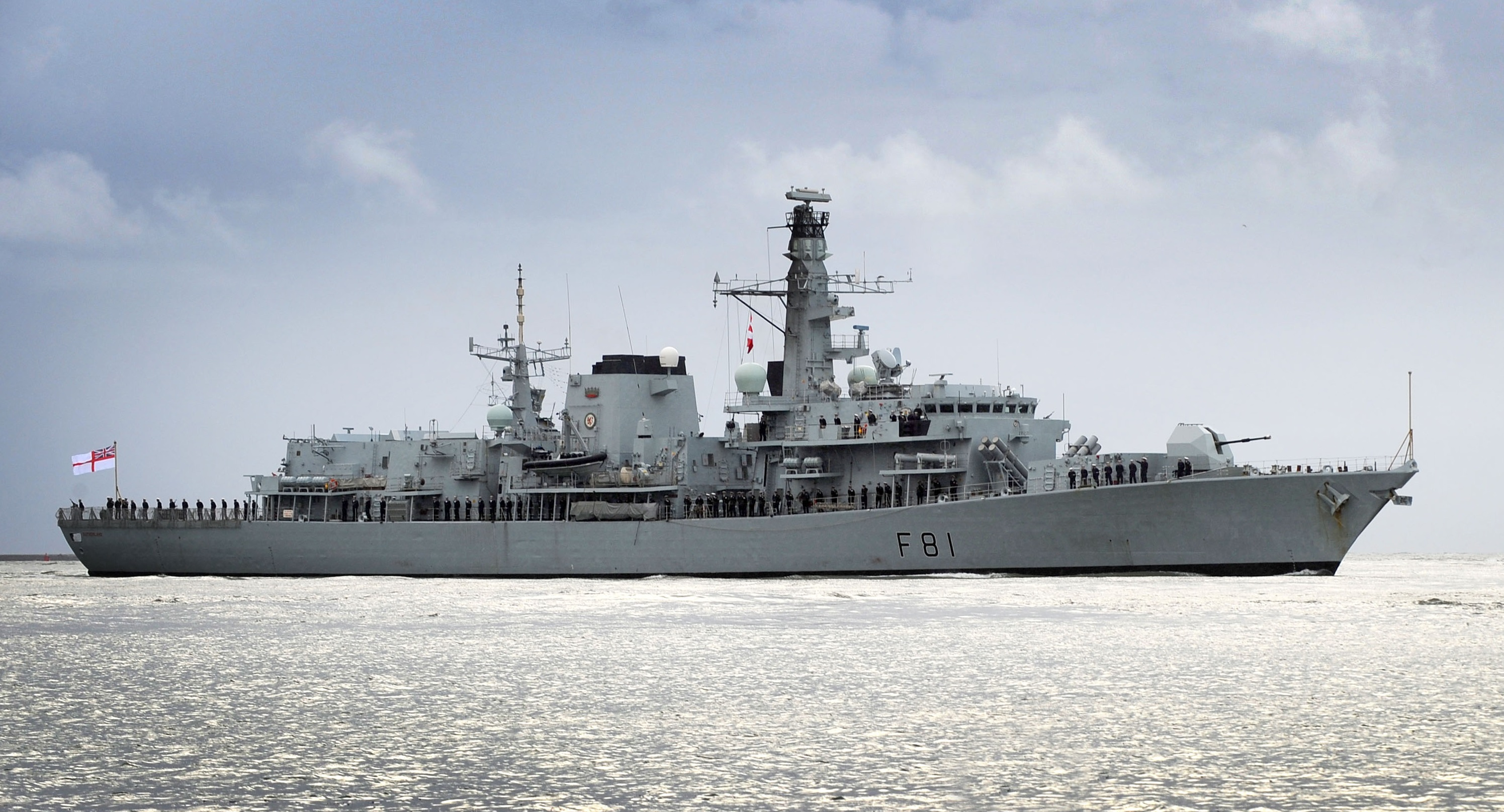
- HMS Sutherland in 2012

History

United Kingdom
- Name: Sutherland
- Ordered: January 1992
- Builder: Yarrow Shipbuilders
- Laid down: 14 October 1993
- Launched: 9 March 1996
- Sponsored by: Lady Christina Walmsley
- Commissioned: 4 July 1997
- Refit: Major 2013–2015, Lifex 2021–onwards
- Home port: HMNB Devonport, Plymouth
- Identification: IMO number: 8949707; MMSI number: 232002833; International call sign: GCOZ
- Motto: Sans peur; ("Without fear")
- Status: in active service
- Badge

General characteristics
- Class & type: Type 23 frigate
- Displacement: 4,900 t (4,800 long tons)
- Length: 133 m (436 ft 4 in)
- Beam: 16.1 m (52 ft 10 in)
- Draught: 7.3 m (23 ft 11 in)
- Propulsion: CODLAG: Four 1,510 kW (2,020 shp) Paxman Valenta 12CM diesel generators; Two GEC electric motors delivering 2,980 kW (4,000 shp); Two Rolls-Royce Spey SM1C delivering 23,190 kW (31,100 shp)
- Speed: In excess of 28 kn (52 km/h; 32 mph) (Note: HMS Sutherland achieved 34.4 knots (63.7 km/h; 39.6 mph) during high-speed trials in November 2008)
- Range: 7,500 nautical miles (14,000 km; 9,000 mi) at 15 kn (28 km/h; 17 mph)
- Complement: 185 (accommodation for up to 205)
- Electronic warfare & decoys: UAF-1 ESM, or, UAT Mod 1; Seagnat; Type 182 towed torpedo decoy; Surface Ship Torpedo Defence
- Armament: Anti-air missiles: 1 × 32-cell Sea Ceptor GWS 35 Vertical Launching System (VLS) canisters for 32 missiles (1–25+ km) (replaced original Sea Wolf SAM); Anti-ship missiles: 2 × quad Harpoon Block 1C (originally fit, retired 2023; may be replaced by Naval Strike Missile in due course); Anti-submarine torpedoes: 2 × twin 12.75 in (324 mm) Sting Ray torpedo tubes; Guns: 1 × BAE 4.5 inch Mk 8 naval gun; 2 × 30 mm DS30M Mk2 guns, or, 2 × 30 mm DS30B guns; 2 × Miniguns (replaced by Browning .50 caliber heavy machine guns as of 2023); 4 × General-purpose machine guns
- Aircraft carried: 1 × Wildcat HMA2, armed with: 4 × Sea Venom anti-ship missiles (initial operating capability from October 2025; full operating capability projected from 2026) or, 2 × Sting Ray anti-submarine torpedoes, or; 20 × Martlet multirole missiles (from 2021); Mk 11 depth charges; or; 1 × Westland Merlin HM2, armed with; 4 × anti-submarine torpedoes
- Aviation facilities: Flight deck; Enclosed hangar

HMS Sutherland is a Type 23 frigate of the British Royal Navy. She is the thirteenth ship in the Duke class of frigates and is the third ship to bear the name, more than 200 years since the name was last used.

She was launched in 1996 by Lady Christina Walmsley, wife of Sir Robert Walmsley. Before this occasion, Royal Navy ships had always been launched with a bottle of champagne, but Lady Walmsley broke with tradition and used a bottle of Macallan Scotch whisky.

== Operational history ==
=== 1997–2000 ===
Sutherland was deployed to the Falkland Islands in the late 1998/ early 1999. In 2000, she was part of the task force NTG2000, the first time Royal Navy ships have circumnavigated the globe since 1986.

=== 2001–2010 ===
HMS Sutherland was on active operations during the 2003 Invasion of Iraq, primarily in the escort role. HMS Sutherland most notably provided a rear-guard naval escort to oil tankers in the Persian Gulf, monitored Iranian forces in south-west Iran and provided support to amphibious landing forces during the Invasion of the Al-Faw peninsula. After berthing at Invergordon, HMS Sutherland was granted the freedom of the county of Sutherland at a ceremony in Dornoch on 18 September 2004. A subsequent visit to Invergordon in March 2011 was cut short, with "operational commitments" as the given reason. This was eventually revealed as her deployment as part of the UK Response Force Task Group's (RFTG) first deployment, named COUGAR 11. She returned to Invergordon in April 2013.

=== 2011–2020 ===
In May 2011, she made a port visit to Patras, Greece, following participation in military exercises off Crete, after which she became involved in the operations off the Libyan coast. On 16 June 2011, Sutherland visited Souda Bay in Crete to commemorate the 70th anniversary of the Battle of Crete, before sailing to Kalamata in Greece to conduct further World War II memorials. On 24 July 2011, Sutherland returned to the coast of Libya as part of Operation Ellamy. On 18 October 2011, Sutherland passed through Tower Bridge in London and docked next to HMS Belfast, returning through the bridge on 22 October 2011.

In 2012, she was part of the COUGAR 12 task group. She took part in Exercise Joint Warrior 2013.

Sutherland to part in 2016 Exercise Griffin Strike, a UK-French combined exercise. Sutherland escorted the Russian frigate Admiral Grigorovich through the English Channel in May 2016. In April 2017, Sutherland was again tasked with escorting Russian warships in the English Channel, on this occasion, the Steregushchiy-class corvettes, Soobrazitelnyy and Boikiy.

Sutherland was the first vessel assigned to escort the aircraft carrier HMS Queen Elizabeth when she embarked on sea trials in June 2017.

In 2018 Sutherland had a deployment to the Pacific Ocean. Part of her mission was "to continue the pressure campaign on North Korea", and on her return traveled through the South China Sea to assert navigation rights against Chinese claims.

Early in 2019 she served as a testbed for an integrated mount for the Martlet LMM and 30 mm cannon, successfully engaging in firing operations against a motorboat-sized target at the Aberporth range in Wales.

In 2020 Sutherland commanded a NATO task group of U.S. destroyer USS Ross (DDG-71) and Norwegian frigate HNoMS Thor Heyerdahl on a deployment to the Barents Sea above the Arctic Circle, supported by RFA Tidespring (A136), to exercise freedom of navigation near Russia. They were supported by a variety of aircraft, including RAF Typhoons for the first time operating in the high north. This was the first time the Royal Navy had led a multinational task group in the area in more than 20 years, and was part of an increased British effort in the region.

=== 2021–present ===
In April 2021, Sutherland entered long-term refit to incorporate Sea Ceptor SAMs as well as other system updates. The frigate was reported to have been removed from dry dock in March 2024, it being anticipated that she would begin post-refit sea trials later in the year. Initial training in advance of post-refit sea trials began in February 2025.. On 14 June 2026, she was part of a task force that intercepted Smyrtos, a Russian shadow fleet tanker in the English Channel along with the minesweeper HMS Ledbury.

Sutherland took part in Exercise Konkan-26 with INS Trishul (F43) of the Indian Navy. The exercise was conducted through two phases — harbour phase from 8 to 11 October 2026 and sea phase from 12 to 15 October. The exercise was conducted by the Fleet Operational Standards and Training.

== Affiliations ==
- The Highlanders, 4th Battalion Royal Regiment of Scotland
- County of Sutherland
- Honourable Company of Master Mariners
- Sherborne School CCF
- Clifton College, Bristol CCF's
- TS Grenville, Paisley (Sea Cadets)
- TS Duchess, Biggleswade (Sea Cadets)
- Royal Dornoch Golf Club
