= Bickleigh, South Hams =

Village in South Hams, Devon, England

Coordinates: 50.442°N 4.082°W

Bickleigh
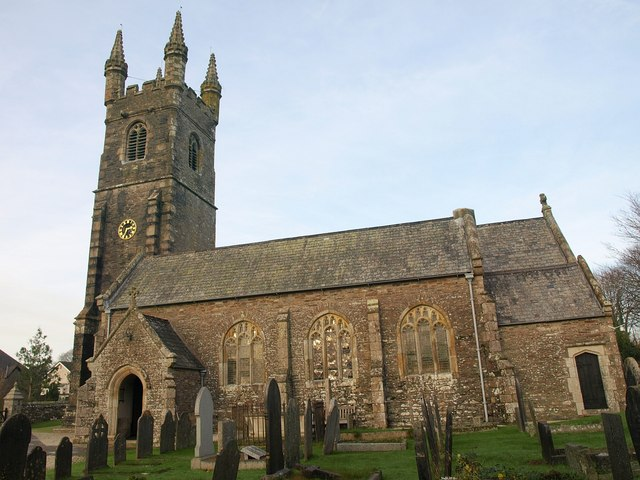
- St Mary's church, Bickleigh

- Location within Devon
- Population: 50
- Civil parish: Bickleigh
- District: South Hams
- Shire county: Devon
- Region: South West
- Country: England
- Sovereign state: United Kingdom
- Post town: PLYMOUTH
- Postcode district: PL8
- Dialling code: 01752

Bickleigh is a small village on the southern edge of Dartmoor in Devon, England. It has a population of about 50 people. It is in the South Hams district, and is about 7 miles (11 km) north of Plymouth city centre. The village is part of the electoral ward called Bickleigh and Shaugh. At the 2011 census the ward population was 4,723. 42 Commando is currently based at Bickleigh Barracks.

The village church has a tower of the 15th century but the rest of the building is the work of Charles Fowler, 1838, and one of the church's two baptismal fonts is 15th century. There is a fine monument to Sir Manasseh Masseh Lopes of Maristow House.
