= Battle of Mount Harriet =

Engagement of the Falklands War in June 1982

Coordinates: 51°42′31.8″S 58°0′56.2″W

- Part of Falklands War
- Selected mountains in East Falkland
Date	11–12 June 1982
Location	Mount Harriet, Falkland Islands
Result	British victory

Belligerents
United Kingdom	Argentina

Commanders and leaders
(United Kingdom) Nick Vaux	(Argentina) Diego Soria

Units involved
3 Commando Brigade: 42 Commando; 29th Commando Regiment; 59 Independent Commando Squadron; 5th Infantry Brigade: 7th Gurkhas; Welsh Guards	4th Monte Caseros Regiment; 12th Infantry Regiment

Strength
400 Royal Marines, 170 Welsh Guards	400 troops

Casualties and losses
2 Royal Marines, 1 Welsh Guardsman killed 30 wounded	18 killed 300 captured

The Battle of Mount Harriet was a military engagement of the Falklands War, which took place on the night of 11/12 June 1982 between British and Argentine forces. It was one of three battles in a Brigade-size operation all on the same night, the other two being the Battle of Mount Longdon and the Battle of Two Sisters.

One of a number of night battles that took place during the British advance towards Stanley, the battle led to British troops capturing all the heights above the town, forcing the surrender of Argentine forces on the islands.

== Background ==
The British force consisted of 42 Commando Royal Marines (42 Cdo RM) under the command of Lieutenant Colonel Nick Vaux Royal Marines, with artillery support from a battery of 29 Commando Regiment, Royal Artillery, engineer support from 2Tp, 59 Independent Commando Squadron (59 Indep Cdo Sqn), Royal Engineers. The 1st Battalion, Welsh Guards (1WG) and two companies from 40 Commando (40 CDO) were in reserve. HMS Yarmouth provided naval gunfire support.

The Argentine defenders consisted of former Argentine Army Green Beret Captain Carlos Alberto Arroyo's B Company from Lieutenant Colonel Diego Alejandro Soria's 4th Monte Caseros (Jungle) Infantry Regiment (RI 4). On 1 June, the Argentine defenders on Harriet and Two Sisters, after having abandoned their field kitchens in their original positions on Mount Challenger, were given permission by their officers to consume their cold-weather ration packs, which helped raise the morale of the conscripts.

Brigadier Julian Thompson, Commander 3 Commando Brigade, later commented on the quality and abundance of these Argentine tinned meals and how they kept his men going when supplies failed to arrive, "The Argentine rations were excellent and plentiful, as many British soldiers and Marines were to discover when they were forced to live on them in captured positions, for lack of helicopter to provide their own."

On the night of 30 May elements of K Company, led by Captain Peter Babbington of 42 Cdo RM boarded three Sea King helicopters and moved forward of San Carlos to secure Mount Kent at 1,093 ft (333 m), one of the tallest of the peaks surrounding Stanley where Major Cedric Delves' D Squadron from the Special Air Service (SAS) had established a presence. When the Royal Marines reinforcements in the Sea Kings, and 7 'Sphinx' Battery of the 29th Commando Regiment Royal Artillery aboard a Chinook helicopter arrived at the landing zone, 3 kilometres (2 miles) behind the ridge of the mountain, they were met by gun-flashes, mortar fire and tracer rounds as another clash involving D Squadron was taking place. Captain Gavin Hamilton's Mountain Troop had this time spotted enemy movement in the form of Argentine Army Green Berets from Captain Tomás Fernández' 2nd Assault Section, 602 Commando Company trying to exit the area after having taking cover on Bluff Cove Peak the day before.

By the end of May, D Squadron had secured Mount Kent at the cost of two wounded in Air Troop (Dick Palmer and Carl Rhodes) from small-arms fire with another SAS man having broken his hand taking cover during the engagement, and Boat Troop with Tactical HQ started patrolling Bluff Cove Peak, which they took with the loss of another two SAS wounded (Ewen Pearcy and Don Masters) hit by hand grenade splinters or rock fragments, including a Spanish-speaking Warrant Officer attached from 23 Special Air Service Regiment (Reserve) who had joined Delves to interrogate any captured Argentine Army Green Berets. At the same time, Captain Matthew Selfridge's D Company, 3 PARA took Teal Inlet Settlement, at the cost of one wounded through an accidental discharge. The SAS soldiers claim coming under mortar bombardment on the night of 30/31 May while evacuating their wounded and 7 'Sphinx' Battery 29th Commando Regiment Royal Artillery reported the loss of one gunner (Van Rooyen), who suffered a broken arm while taking cover among the rocks during the bombardment.

The rest of 42 Commando made a march across the hills north of Mount Simon to reinforce Mounts Kent and Challenger overlooking Port Stanley. The weather conditions were atrocious, with the marines advancing through steep slippery hillocks and stone-runs to their objectives. Lou Armour was a corporal in J Company under Major Mike Norman:

Because of the weather and lack of equipment, we just had to carry all our heavy equipment back to Mount Kent, instead of being flown there. That was psychologically the toughest thing I'd ever done. You're walking and falling, walking and falling—some of the lads carrying up to a hundred pounds—and if you fell over, it took two guys to lift you back up. Then there was the lack of sleep, the wet, the cold, the diarrhoea.

The final attack was preceded by several days of observation and nights of patrolling. Some night-fighting patrols were part of a deception to convince the Argentines that the attack would come from a westerly direction. Other, more covert patrols were to find a route through a minefield around the south of Mount Harriet. Sniping and naval artillery were used to harass the defenders and deny them sleep.

On 3 June, Lieutenant Chris Mawhood's Reconnaissance Troop of 42 Cdo RM on Mount Wall, accompanying the 3 Commando Brigade Forward Air Control team commanded by Flight Lieutenant Dennis Marshall-Hasdell, encountered two rifle sections from the 4th Monte Caseros Regiment (Second Lieutenant Lautaro Jiménez-Corbalán's 3rd Platoon of B Company from Mount Harriet). The night before, the section under Corporal Elvio Alberto Balcaza had detected the presence of British troops on Mount Wall and the section under Corporal Nicolas Víctor Odorcic moved forward to assist under the cover of the early morning mist. However, at around 11.00 hours (local time) the Recce Troop opened fire and two conscripts (Privates Celso Paez and Roberto Ledesma) were instantly killed, and their NCO (Odorcic) went down, concussed when shot in the helmet by one of the Marine snipers.

This action drew attention to their exposed forward position, and Argentine reinforcements in the form of a rifle section under Corporal Walter Ariel Pintos from Second Lieutenant Marcelo Llambías Pravaz's 3rd Platoon on Two Sisters joined the action with a counterattack firing rifle-grenades. The Primary Forward Air Controller, commando-trained Flight Lieutenant Dennis Marshal-Hasdell, remembers:

We were separated from our heavy bergens with the radios and all our gear. The patrol was spread over quite a large area, with lots of shouting, noise and firing going on. The Marines abandoned all their equipment, and although no one told us, it became clear that we were to withdraw. With no information and the likelihood of having to fight our way out, Dave Greedus and I decided to abandon our equipment, destroying as much as we could. The two radio sets (HF and UHF) were tough enough, but the HAZE unit of the laser target marker was designed to withstand the weight of a tank!

The Ferranti laser-target-designator retrieved in the contact showed that the Royal Marines were seeking to destroy the Argentine bunkers on Mount Harriet with 1,000-pound GBU-16 Paveway II dropped by RAF Harriers. The next day, Lieutenant Tony Hornby's 11 Troop re-occupied the Mount Wall observation post against no opposition. However, on the night of 5–6 June, Captain Andrés Ferrero's 3rd Assault Section from 602 Commando Company attacked Lieutenant Hornby's men on Mount Wall and the Royal Marines were forced to withdraw.

That same night (5–6 June), a British Gazelle helicopter, XX377 of 656 Squadron, which was transporting communications equipment to support the planned advance of the 5th Infantry Brigade, was shot down in a friendly fire incident by a Sea Dart missile launched from HMS Cardiff. All four personnel on board were killed.

As a reward for their efforts, the Argentine Land Forces Commander (Brigadier-General Oscar Luis Jofre) who had been visiting the Commanding Officer of the 4th Regiment during the gun-battle on 3 June, ordered that the recently arrived boxes of chocolate bars from the Argentine hospital ship Bahía Paraiso to be distributed among the Mount Harriet defenders, regardless of rank.

== Initial actions ==
On 8 June, the British troopships Sir Galahad and Sir Tristram were attacked by Argentine aircraft at Bluff Cove. Lieutenant-Colonel Diego Alejandro Soria sought permission to attack the British beachhead with the 4th Regiment, but his request was denied. The Rifle Company Commander on Harriet, Captain Carlos Arroyo recalled, "It seem to us to be the optimum moment to leave our positions and go to the attack when we saw the vulnerability of the English ships. Initially I was a little afraid but when I saw the battle was going in our favour due to the action of the aircraft, I was longing to go and attack the English."

That day, reinforcements in the form of machine-gunners, mortarmen and protecting riflemen from the 1st 'Patricios' Infantry Regiment, Regiment of Mounted Grenadiers and 17th Airborne Infantry Regiment arrived from Comodoro Rivadavia to support the 4th Infantry Regiment. On the night of 8–9 June, action on the outer defence zone flared when Lieutenant Mark Townsend's 1 Troop (K Company, 42 CDO) probed Mount Harriet, killing two Argentines (Corporal Hipolito Gonzalez and Private Martiniano Gomez) from Second Lieutenant Jiménez-Corbalán's 3rd Platoon. At the same time, two platoon-sized fighting patrols from 45 Cdo RM attempted the same on Two Sisters Mountain, but the Argentine RASIT ground surveillance radar on Mount Longdon was able to detect the 45 Cdo RM troops, and artillery fire dispersed the British force. In all, Second Lieutenant Lautaro Jiménez-Corbalán would report the loss of 6 killed and 14 wounded fighting off Lieutenant Mawhood's Recce Troop on Mount Wall and the raid of Lieutenant Townsend's 1 Troop, including losses suffered during the final British assault on Mount Harriet on the night of 11–12 June.

Around dusk on 9 June, Lieutenant-Colonel Soria's men detected the presence of British troops who had taken up positions in Port Harriet House on the southern approaches to Mount Harriet. The 4th Regiment's Reconnaissance Platoon, under Sub-Lieutenant Jorge Pasolli, received orders to move forward and clear at bayonet point if necessary the British from the farmhouse and the Scots Guards Reconnaissance Platoon that had moved into the area was forced to withdraw when the Argentine force, with Paratroop-trained First Lieutenant Francisco Pablo D'Aloia (adjutant of RI 4's Commanding Officer) at the head, radioed fire support from the 120-mm Mortar Platoon dug in on Mount Harriet. Sub-Lieutenant Pasolli's men attacked and the Scots Guards returned fire with two Bren machine guns but were forced to abandon their rucksacks and radios. As the Guardsmen retreated, under small arms and mortar fire, they sustained three wounded, including Sergeant Ian Allum.

On the morning of 11 June, the orders for the attack were given to 42 Cdo RM by Lieutenant Colonel Vaux. K Company was ordered to attack the eastern end of the mountain, while L Company would attack the southern side an hour later, where if the mountain was secured, would move North to occupy Goat Ridge. J Company would launch a diversionary attack (code-named Vesuvius) on the western end of Mount Harriet. If these objectives fell quickly, 42 Cdo RM would proceed to capture Mount William.

In the closing hours of 11 June, K and L Companies moved from their assembly area on Mount Challenger (which lay to the west of Mount Harriet) and made their way south, around their objective, across the minefield, to their respective start lines. As they moved around the feature in the dark, J Company with supporting Welsh Guards launched a loud diversionary "attack" from the west.

== Battle ==
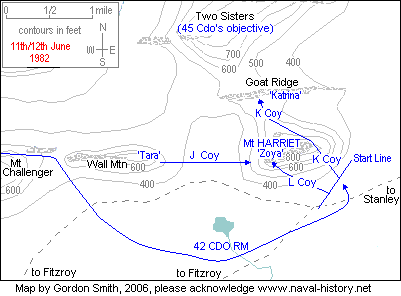
A map of the Battle of Mount Harriet.

The battle for Mount Harriet began on the evening of 11 June with a heavy naval softening-up bombardment that killed two Argentinians and wounded twenty-five.

John Witheroe, one of the British war correspondents, later recalled the heavy Royal Navy bombardment:

We were involved with one night attack on Mount Harriet when the Welsh Guards were coming up as a back-up. This involved marching for several hours on a very dark night, through a minefield. Sporadic shellfire slowed our progress tremendously. Eventually, we made the base of Mount Harriet, which was coming under incredible fire from a frigate offshore. The whole mountain seemed to erupt in flame. It seemed impossible that anybody could survive an attack like that. This went on for well over an hour, shell after shell whistling over our heads and hitting the mountain. Eventually, this was lifted and the Marines went in. To our amazement, there seemed to be an incredible amount of fighting going on. There was a lot of tracer fire. The whole night was being lit up by flares, which cast a dead, unrealistic, pall over the whole scene.

The Argentines retaliated and Captain Tomás Fox, the artillery observation officer on Mount Kent, directed 155 mm artillery rounds that fell among the men of 'B' Company, 7th Duke of Edinburgh's Own Gurkha Rifles in the area of Bluff Cove, seriously wounding four Gurkhas, including Lance Corporal Gyanendra Rai, who nearly bled to death.

During the accompanying Argentine long-range mortar bombardment from Mount Harriet, a Wessex helicopter delivering supplies at Bluff Cove was nearly shot down after taking several hits from flying shrapnel and had to be taken out of service while repairs were completed after limping back to San Carlos.

During the patrolling period, the Royal Marines had discovered a path through a minefield (possibly frozen) that Lieutenant Roberto Francisco Eito's platoon of sappers from the 601st Combat Engineers Company had laid around Mount Harriet, allowing the 42 Cdo RM rifle companies to attack the two Argentine 4th Regiment companies on Mount Harriet from the south and east.

Captain Peter Babbington's K Company crossed their start line first and proceeded up the mountain undetected, knifing two sentries on the way. They remained undetected until they approached Sub-Lieutenant Mario Hector Juárez' 120 mm mortar platoon positions and decided to engage them. They were assisted in the advance by HMS Yarmouth's, artillery, and their own Commando's mortars. During the engagement, Second Lieutenant Juárez was badly wounded firing his handgun in the dark and Corporal Laurence G Watts from K Company was killed clearing the occupants of a tent. The supporting British artillery and mortars fired over 1,000 rounds to keep the Argentines pinned down, and helped stop the defenders getting a proper aim at the Royal Marines from K and L Companies.

About 150 metres from Soria's HQ, Corporal Steve Newland circled behind a group of Argentines (under First Lieutenant Jorge Agustín Echeverría, the 4th Regiment's intelligence officer) who along with ten men he had earlier on gathered from Sub-Lieutenant Eugenio César Bruny's 2nd Rifle Platoon with the intent of making a local counterattack were now gathering retreating soldiers and setting up an ambush. Newland pulled back into cover and warned the lead elements in K Company. Each time a Royal Marine moved, Corporal Roberto Bacilio Baruzzo would open fire with the help of his night vision rifle scope, to make it appear there was only one enemy sniper holding up K Company. First Lieutenant Echeverría's men were holding their fire in order to encourage the British to break cover and rush their position only to run into the concentrated fire of the machine-gun and protecting riflemen. With half a platoon of RI4 and RI12 riflemen and a 7.62 mm general-purpose machine gun team threatening to blunt the British advance, Newland darted out from cover and charged the enemy. He neutralized the machine gun with grenades and killed three Argentine soldiers, but on reaching the rear of the position, Corporal Baruzzo shot Newland in both legs.

With the enemy machine gun out of action, Corporals Steve Newland, Mick Eccles and Chrystie 'Sharky' Ward were able to clear the remaining Argentine troops and captured 17 Argentines, including Baruzzo and Echeverría with the Argentinian intelligence officer having been shot five times. The three British corporals were each awarded the Military Medal. Corporal Roberto Baruzzo was awarded the Medal of Valour in Combat.

Increasing numbers of Argentine soldiers, mainly shocked and dazed conscripts from RI4's Recce Platoon, Reserve Platoon and 120-mm Mortar Platoon began to surrender but several experienced officers (First Lieutenants Francisco Pablo D'Aloia, Esteban Guillermo Carlucci, Luis Oscar García and Sub-Lieutenants Jorge Pasolli and Edgardo Duarte-Lachnight)as well as the senior NCOs (including the Regimental Sergeant-Major Miguel Angel Cáceres) fought on, in accordance to their orders. The RI 4 Commanding Officer and the medical officer First Lieutenant Rubén Cichiara, covered by the Regiment of Mounted Grenadiers machine-gun detachment under Sergeant Jorge Alberto Rivero, linked up with B Company and ordered Arroyo's men to counterattack. The heavy machine gun teams and protecting riflemen, in general, remained at their positions continuing the fight.

Captain David Wheen's L Company crossed their start line shortly after K Company and were almost immediately engaged by machine-gun fire from Sub-Lieutenant Pablo Oliva's platoon of conscripts defending the lower southern slopes. There were several casualties from this fire, including Lieutenant Ian Stafford the only Argyll and Sutherland Highlander in the campaign who was on exchange as L Company's second -in-command and was shot in the leg. Kim Sabido, the IRN reporter with L Company, reported stiff Argentine resistance:

For a couple of hours it seemed as if it might all go wrong. Pinned down on the slopes by heavy machine gun and sniper fire, progress was painfully slow. I saw several men fall with bullet wounds, others were hit by flying fragments from the constant barrage of long-distance high-explosive shelling. The men in front of us were not giving up without a bitter fight.

The weapons in Oliva's platoon would not be silenced until being hit by several MILAN anti-tank missiles and the supporting 105mm artillery guns from Mount Challenger, with Oliva reporting the loss of 3 men killed (Sergeant Héctor Montellano, Corporal Oscar Labalta and Private Juan Raúl Serradori) and 14 wounded (including the platoon sergeant, Ramón Antonio Barrios and Corporals Héctor Adán Pereyra and Carlos Alberto López) in his platoon. L Company took 5 hours to advance 600 metres in the face of reinforcements in the form of Sub-Lieutenant Bruny's RI 4 Platoon and contend they took fire from at least seven machine guns and protecting rifle teams that wounded five men. British military historian Hugh Bicheno reports that the 4th Regiment's passive night goggles were all with Arroyo's B Company. Another 11 marines in Captain Wheen's Company were wounded by Argentine shellfire that Lieutenant-Colonel Soria personally brought down attempting to halt the British advance. One of the attacking Royal Marines, Geoff Power, remembers:

I nearly got blown up. It was a miracle escape, really. An artillery shell landed right next to me and threw me through the air. It shook me up a bit and collapsed my lungs. That bomb injured quite a few of my mates who were taken away to get treatment, but I carried on.

Before first light, Lieutenant Jerry Burnell's 5 Troop of L Company proceeded to an outcrop of rocks towards Goat Ridge. As they advanced, the Royal Marine platoon came under fire from Second Lieutenant Jiménez-Corbalán 3rd Platoon, covering the Argentine retreat and were forced to withdraw under cover of the machine guns pre-positioned behind and further up the hill. The Troop took one casualty in this action. L Company requested mortar fire onto the Argentines; a mixture of High explosive (HE) and White phosphorus (WP); then 5 Troop moved forward supported by the 15 machine-guns positioned on the ridge. They took 3 prisoners although most of Jiménez-Corbalán men had withdrawn after losing two killed in the night fighting (Privates Juan José Acuña and Carlos Epifanio Casco). The platoon of Oscar Augusto Silva continued to resist from Goat Ridge in the early morning light and a determined conscript (Orlando Aylan or Eduardo Gómez), in a position just below the summit of Mount Harriet held up L Company with accurate shooting until killed by an 8.4cm anti-tank rocket fired at short range.

Lieutenant Julian Pusey, commanding 6 Troop who was wounded along with half a dozen men in L Company taking on in what all those involved believed to be a stay-behind sniper later commented on the tough Argentine resistance:

From my perspective Lima Company’s action in the Battle of Mount Harriet had been hard fought, and, at times, intense. Those who opposed us had endured the initial bombardment and then had the nerve to hold their ground, with a company of Royal Marines coming towards them. They had made good use of their elevated position and used night vision equipment to their advantage. I don’t believe the outcome of the battle was ever in doubt, but the fact it took many hours to advance six hundred metres tells the story. Six Troop had suffered three injured men; Marine George Brown, Marine David Coulthard, and myself.

5 Troop continued their advance across open ground towards Goat Ridge but came under fire and withdrew into the cover of rocks. British artillery bombarded Silva's platoon and L Company was able to resume the advance in the form of 4 Troop and captured Goat Ridge after Silva's men had withdrawn.

At some time in the early morning darkness, Second Lieutenant Jiménez-Corbalán's 3rd platoon were making their way to new positions on Mount William, the officer was concussed and temporarily blinded when he set off an Argentine booby-trap while leading his men through a minefield. At great risk to themselves, his radio operator Privates Teodoro Flores and Carlos Salvatierra rescued their platoon commander and were decorated for their bravery.

== Aftermath ==
The battle was an example of good planning, use of deception and surprise and was a further step towards the main objective of Stanley. Two Royal Marines, Corporal Laurence George Watts and Corporal Jeremy Smith were killed, and thirty were wounded, including fourteen in L Company. Another seven Scots Guards and Gurkhas were wounded by Argentine artillery and mortar fire controllers on Mount Harriet. On 13 June, a Welsh Guards messenger (Lance Corporal Chris Thomas), bringing forward food supplies to Major Christopher Drewrywe's Number 2 Company (1WG), via Mount Harriet's lower slopes was killed when his motorbike ran over a mine or was hit by mortar fire.

Eighteen Argentines were killed defending Mount Harriet, including those killed in earlier patrol battles and shelling. The night battle had lasted longer than expected, leaving no time for 42 Commando to capture Mount William under the cover of darkness as had been planned. Lance Corporal Tony Koleszar had the surprising experience of finding that two 'dead' Argentine soldiers, whose boots he was trying to remove, were very much alive and jumped up to surrender.

Some British reporters depicted the Argentineans as hapless teenage conscripts who caved in after the first shots were fired, but Royal Marine Warrant Officer 2 John Cartledge, who served with L Company during the battle, corrected them, saying the Argentines were good soldiers who had fought properly:

They used the tactics which they had been taught along the way very well, they were quite prepared for an attack. They put up a strong fight from start to finish. They were also better equipped than we were. We had first-generation night sights, which were large cumbersome pieces of equipment, while the Argentines had second-generation American night sights that were compact and so much better than what we had. The one deficiency which we exposed was that they had planned for a western end of the mountain attack and therefore had not bothered to extend their defensive positions to the eastern end, where we ultimately attacked.

The 4th Infantry Regiment had taken up positions on Mount Harriet and Two Sisters Mountain on 1 June. Their small individual Lineman entrenching tools were all broken by the time they took over their new defensive-line after having constructed solid positions on Mount Challenger and Wall Mountain during May, as the Argentinian Regimental Commander explained to British military historian Martin Middlebrook.

One British general put their success down to his Marines' skill and professionalism:

What was needed was speed but not being bloody stupid. The Israelis would have done it much faster but with many more casualties.

42 Commando captured 300 prisoners on Mount Harriet, and for the bravery shown in the attack, Lieutenant Colonel Nick Vaux was awarded a Distinguished Service Order, Captain Babbington of K Coy a Military Cross, Sergeant Collins, Corporals; Eccles, Newland and Ward, also of K Coy were each awarded Military Medals. Eight men were Mentioned in dispatches.

After the battle, Corporal Krishnakumar Rai of the Queens Gurkha Engineers would be killed whilst engaged in clearing the minefield and booby-traps that the Argentine Marines had laid in nearby Goat Ridge, the same explosives that had injured Sub-Lieutenant Jiménez-Corbalán as he made his way to William with his men from Harriet.

In 2017, David Wheen travelled to Argentina to meet Lautaro Jiménez-Corbalán, in an act of reconciliation, Wheen presented Jiménez-Corbalán with a British military essay and painting of the battle and received in return, a copy of his book Malvinas en Primera Línea (Falklands on the Front Line), recounting the experiences of the 4th Regiment in the Falklands.

In 2019, Marine Andy Damstag from L Company who dragged Corporal Héctor Pereyra into the cover of rocks during the British attack and spent the next two hours looking after the wounded Argentine NCO, offering him sweets and cigarettes, contacted him and returned his helmet that he had kept as a souvenir with the help of the Argentine Embassy in London.
