= Seizure of the Smyrtos =

- MV Smyrtos anchored in Weymouth Bay on the day of seizure, 14 June 2026, with HMS Sutherland behind.
- Location: English Channel
- Planned by: National Crime Agency; Royal Marines; 42 Commando
- Objective: Seizure of the MV Smyrtos
- Date: 14 June 2026
- Executed by: 42 Commando; HMS Sutherland; HMS Ledbury

The British Armed Forces intercepted and seized the oil tanker MV Smyrtos in the English Channel on 14 June 2026, stating it was part of the Russian shadow fleet. It was the first UK‑led naval capture of a shadow fleet vessel.

== Background and seizure ==
The Smyrtos (IMO number: 9389100), an Aframax oil tanker built in 2009, departed Ust-Luga, Russia on 5 June and was sailing to India via the Suez canal. At the time of seizure, Smyrtos was owned by Chinese company Zhao Yao Shipping Limited.

Smyrtos had been Cameroon flagged since December 2025, until 36 vessels including Smyrtos were removed from the Cameroon ship register earlier in June, reported by Lloyd's List on 10 June, following European Union (EU) diplomatic pressure. The tanker had previously been registered in The Gambia. Since October 2025 Smyrtos has been under sanctions by the EU and UK for involvement in the export of Russian crude oil.

The operation was conducted by 42 Commando and the National Crime Agency and supported by HMS Sutherland and HMS Ledbury. The operation lasted six hours on 14 June 2026. British prime minister Keir Starmer said he had personally ordered the interception, releasing a video on TikTok where he said "Another bad day to be Vladimir Putin ... In the early hours of this morning, I directed our armed forces to intercept a shadow fleet oil tanker attempting to pass through the English Channel". The Ministry of Defence stated the enforcement action took place within British territorial waters in accord with domestic and international law.

On 16 June 2026, the Russian frigate Admiral Grigorovich fired flares and warning rifle shots into the air as a British yacht approached it in the English Channel off the Isle of Wight. The yacht, which suffered no injuries or damage, was assisted by the British patrol vessel HMS Tyne.

== Detention of vessel and arrest of captain ==
MV Smyrtos in Weymouth Bay in September 2026.

The seized Smyrtos was anchored off the Dorset coast near Portland Harbour. The captain, Indian national Ajay Pant, was arrested and charged with allegedly controlling a ship delivering prohibited oil or oil products from Russia to a third country in contravention of Regulation 46Z9B of the The Russia (Sanctions) (EU Exit) Regulations 2019, and remanded in custody. The Department for Transport carried out daily welfare checks on the 24 crew members from India and Georgia who remained on board. No environmental or safety concerns were found with the vessel. The Guardian reported that Smyrtos had set sail under the Cameroon flag, but had been expelled from the Cameroon ship register leaving it legally stateless.

On 16 July Captain Ajay Pant appeared by video link before Southwark Crown Court; his application for bail was denied and he remained on remand at Winchester Prison. Lloyd's List reported that elsewhere in Europe stateless vessels had been detained, penalties imposed, and the vessel subsequently released. The UK had gone further by charging and detaining the captain, with Lloyd's List commenting this is a test case for how far states are prepared to use criminal law against individual seafarers for decisions made by vessel owners. The captain's wife had yet to receive a visa to travel to the UK to visit him. Agence France-Presse (AFP) reported that the sanctions offence has a maximum sentence of 10 years in prison. By August most of the other 24 crew members had returned home.

A trial date of 15 December 2026 at Southwark Crown Court has been set.

== Subsequent affect on shipping ==
A few days later a Russian-flagged tanker passed through the English Channel. Several other vessels travelling to and from Russia changed course to avoid the channel, seemingly intending to pass to the north of Scotland in international waters.

== See also ==
- Marinera (ship)
- United Kingdom government sanctions
