= 2026 English Channel incident =

2026 maritime incident

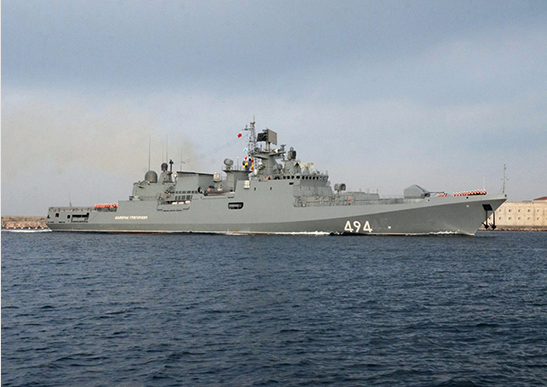
- Admiral Grigorovich
- Date: 16 June 2026
- Location: 20 nautical miles (37 kilometres; 23 miles) south of Isle of Wight, United Kingdom; 50°10′N 01°10′W
- Cause: British yacht was sailing towards Russian frigate in foggy conditions
- Property damage: none

On 16 June 2026, the Russian frigate Admiral Grigorovich sounded horn blasts and then fired flares and warning rifle shots as British yacht Bright Future, sailed by a retired couple, was approaching the warship in foggy conditions, in the English Channel between Normandy and the Isle of Wight.

The incident occurred 20 nautical miles (37 km) south of the Isle of Wight. Warning rifle shots were fired from about 500 yards (457 m) away into the air, which BBC News described as a "relatively near distance by the standards of sea travel". No damage was reported to the yacht which was eventually assisted by a boat from HMS Tyne. The Admiral Grigorovich, whose mission was to escort Russian-flagged vessels through the English Channel, was being shadowed at the time by HMS Mersey.

== Incident ==
The yacht was a UK-registered 39-foot (12 m) Bavaria 39 based in Lymington, making its way across the English Channel to Cherbourg Harbour in France. It was being sailed by retirees, Jane and Alan Kelvey. The incident occurred on the morning of 16 June 2026 at about 11:40 UTC, approximately 20 nautical miles (37 km; 23 mi) south of the Isle of Wight, outside territorial waters.

According to the yacht crew, the Russian warship, which was motionless, sounded five horn blasts, a signal indicating a request for acknowledgement of sighting. The yacht responded by altering its course slightly to demonstrate that it had observed the warship. A second series of five horn blasts followed shortly afterward, accompanied by several rounds of small arms fire, which were described as warning shots that "went up into the air" rather than aimed at the sailing boat. The yacht responded by starting its engine and steering 90 degrees to port, then continuing its passage to Cherbourg. The warship was not operating its automatic identification system (AIS) transponder to show its position to nearby vessels. The yacht had been sailing at about 5 knots (2.6 metres per second).

The Russian Ministry of Defence stated that the yacht had approached to within 150 metres (490 ft) before a warning shot was fired, and earlier attempts had been made to contact the yacht by radio and that warning flares had been launched, asserting that the warship's crew had acted in accordance with international maritime regulations.

After the incident a Royal Navy boat from HMS Tyne visited the yacht to check that the crew were safe.

The Daily Telegraph reported that military officials they had contacted stated that this was a "nautical incident" rather than escalatory behaviour by Russia, suggesting that any fault was that of the yacht, and stressing that giving warning shots was standard naval procedure to a risk of collision. The New York Times reported that defence officials had told them the warship had tried unsuccessfully to communicate with the yacht and had fired warning shots because it was deliberately drifting, not unusual for a warship, so was not able to take rapid avoidance action. The Guardian reported that the UK Ministry of Defence took the view it was a simple nautical incident due to the foggy weather and possibly poor sailing.

== Reactions ==
On the day of the incident a spokesperson for the UK Ministry of Defence said "We are investigating reports of an incident in the Channel."

Prime Minister Sir Keir Starmer described the firing as "reckless," stating that the incident should never have occurred. The shadow defence secretary, James Cartlidge, highlighted that the event was “very concerning” and emphasized that the UK must “be in no doubt that Russia poses a direct threat”.

In interviews the following day, the yacht crew stated "We actually had right of way", though they did not argue the point with a warship. They denied that the warship had tried to contact them by radio, or had fired flares. They took the view that the UK government was agreeing with the Russian position to avoid a diplomatic incident and that the UK Ministry of Defence was "trying to shut the story down".

The Guardian suggested that the considerable media coverage in the UK of "a seemingly savage Russian foe meeting middle England's implacable conviction in its own common sense" was due to the story being made to reflect badly on the prime minister during the ongoing 2026 Labour Party leadership crisis.

== See also ==
- Seizure of the Smyrtos
- 2021 Black Sea incident
- Dogger Bank incident
