= RM Bickleigh =

Royal Marines base in Devon, England

Bickleigh Barracks
- Bickleigh, South Hams

Site information
- Type: Royal Marines Base
- Owner: Ministry of Defence
- Operator: Royal Navy
- Controlled by: Royal Marines
- Condition: Operational
- Website: RM Bickleigh - Royal Navy

Location
- Location within Devon Bickleigh Barracks (the United Kingdom)
- Coordinates: 50.43910°N 4.08080°W

Site history
- Built: 1940
- Built for: War Office
- Built by: A French & Co
- In use: 1940-Present

Garrison information
- Occupants: 42 Commando Royal Marines

RM Bickleigh, or Bickleigh Barracks, is a military installation at Bickleigh, South Hams which is currently used by 42 Commando.

== History ==
The barracks were built by A French & Co and completed in early 1940 during the Second World War. In 1950 the Commando School Royal Marines which had been formed at Achnacarry during the war and which had moved to Gibraltar Barracks at Towyn after the war, relocated to the barracks. The Commando School moved to Lympstone in February 1960. The barracks became the home of 42 Commando in 1971.
