= Nick Vaux =

Royal Marine officer

Major-General Nick Vaux CB DSO
- Military career
- Allegiance: United Kingdom
- Branch: Royal Marines
- Service years: 1954–1990
- Rank: Major-General
- Commands: 42 Commando
- Conflicts: Suez Crisis; Falklands War: Battle of Mount Harriet
- Awards: Companion of the Order of the Bath; Distinguished Service Order

Major-General Nicholas Francis Vaux, CB, DSO is a retired Royal Marines officer who commanded 42 Commando during the Falklands War.

== Military career ==
Vaux joined the Royal Marines in 1954 and completed training in time to take part in the first helicopter-borne amphibious operation as a member of 45 Commando during the Suez Crisis. He was appointed commanding officer of 42 Commando in 1981. In 1982, following the Argentine invasion of the Falkland Islands, Vaux deployed to the Islands as part of 3 Commando Brigade, commanding 42 Commando during combat operations and taking part in the Battle of Mount Harriet.

After the Falklands War, Vaux went on to serve as major general, Commando Forces, and retired from the Royal Marines in 1990.
