= HMS Ledbury (M30) =

1981 Hunt-class mine countermeasures vessel of the Royal Navy

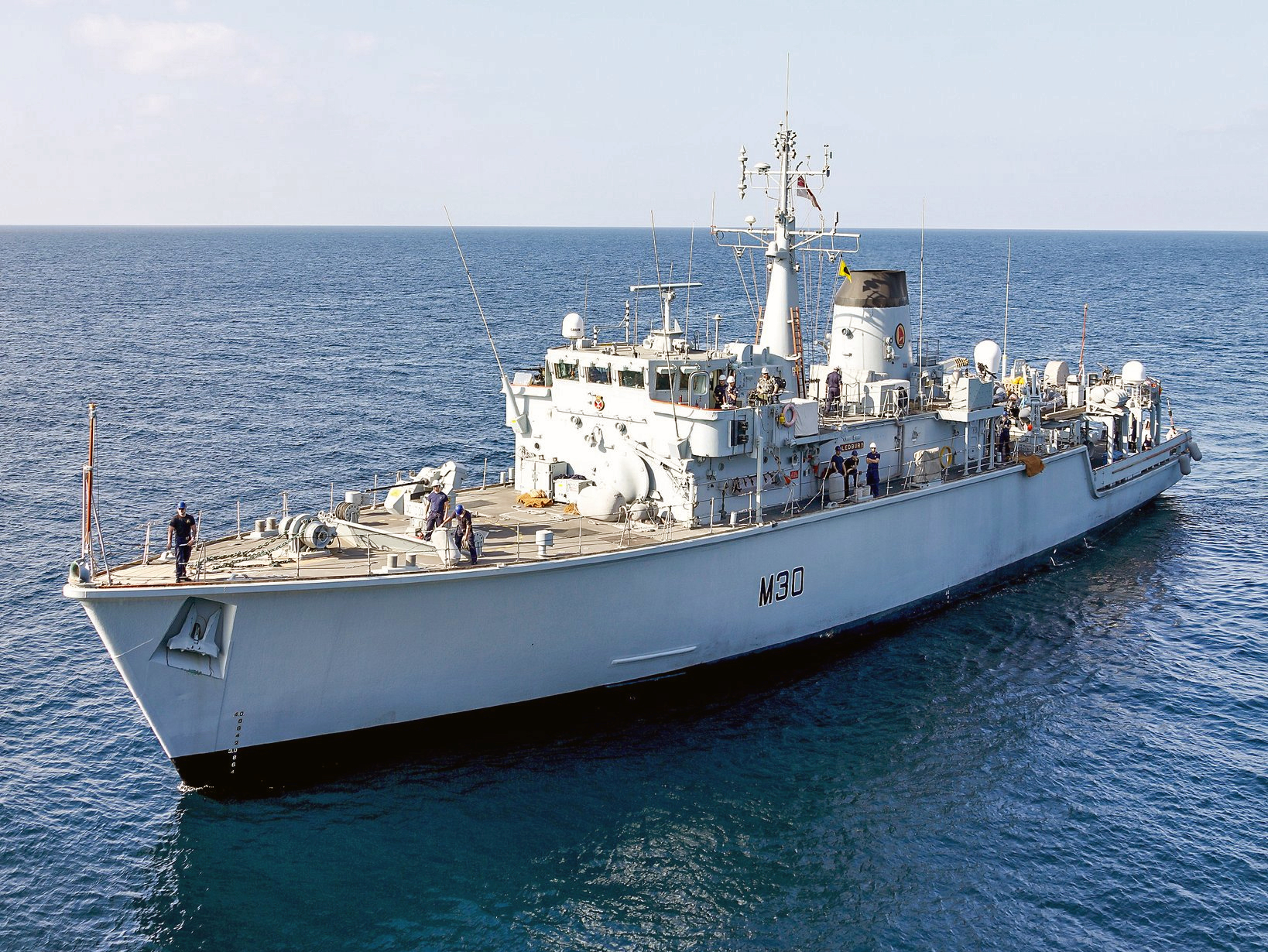
- HMS Ledbury on Operation Kipion, 2020

History

United Kingdom
- Name: HMS Ledbury
- Ordered: 31 March 1977
- Builder: Vosper Thornycroft
- Launched: December 1979
- Sponsored by: Lady Elizabeth Berthan
- Commissioned: 11 June 1981
- Home port: HMS Jufair, Bahrain
- Identification: Pennant number: M30; IMO number: 4906587; MMSI number: 232002833; International call sign: GWAE
- Motto: Mors Mina ("Death to Mines")
- Honours and awards: Kuwait (1991); Al Faw (2003)
- Status: Ship in active service

General characteristics
- Class & type: Hunt-class mine countermeasures vessel
- Displacement: 750 t (740 long tons; 830 short tons)
- Length: 60 m (196 ft 10 in)
- Beam: 9.8 m (32 ft 2 in)
- Draught: 2.2 m (7 ft 3 in)
- Propulsion: 2 × Caterpillar C32, 2 × FPP – 757 kW (1,015 hp)
- Speed: 16 knots (30 km/h; 18 mph)
- Boats & landing craft carried: 2 × MIB Diving Support Boats
- Complement: 45 (5 officers & 39 ratings)
- Sensors & processing systems: Sonar Type 2193
- Electronic warfare & decoys: SeaFox mine disposal system; Diver-placed explosive charges
- Armament: 1 × 30mm DS30B S30GM1; 2 × Miniguns (may be replaced by Browning .50 caliber heavy machine guns as of 2023); 3 × General purpose machine guns

HMS Ledbury, the second ship of the name, is a Hunt-class mine countermeasures vessel of the Royal Navy. She was launched in December 1979 and commissioned on 11 June 1981, the second ship of her class. She cost £65 million at time of building, which was at the time the most expensive cost-per-metre for any class of ship built by the Royal Navy. Most of this cost went into the research and development of Ledbury's glass reinforced plastic hull.

== Operational history ==
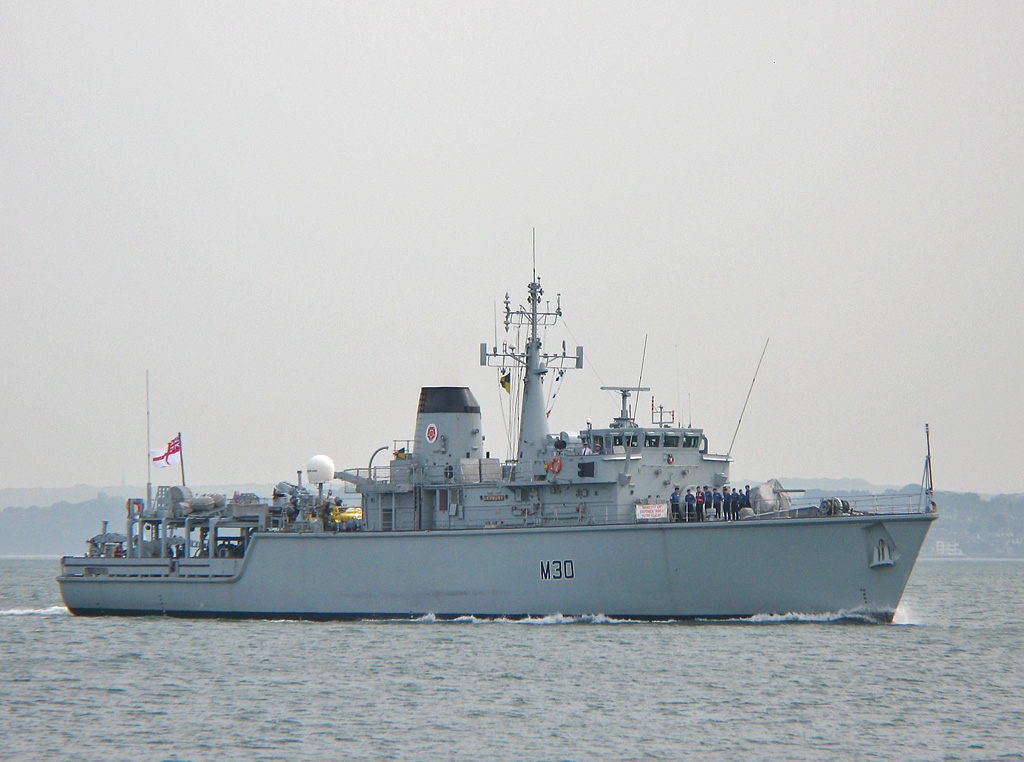
HMS Ledbury in Portsmouth 2007

Ledbury is attached to the Second Mine Countermeasures Squadron, based in Portsmouth.

=== 1981–1990 ===
Ledbury was not involved in the Falklands Conflict itself but arrived in the South Atlantic in July 1982 with sister ship Brecon to clear the waters around the islands of Argentinian mines.

=== 2009–2010 ===
Ledbury underwent a docking maintenance period, commencing in June 2009, to fit the new Seafox mine disposal equipment.

=== 2011–2020 ===
In 2013, Ledbury twice joined NATO Mine Countermeasure groups, one deployment taking her to the Mediterranean Sea, the other to the Baltic Sea. In June 2014, Ledbury took part in the commemorations to mark the 70th anniversary of the Normandy landings.

Ledbury entered refit in 2015, during which her engines were replaced with newer, more efficient diesels. Following sea trials, Ledbury took part in Exercise Joint Warrior off the west coast of Scotland. It was announced in March 2017 that Ledbury would deploy to the Persian Gulf later in 2017 to relieve sister ship HMS Chiddingfold. It was expected that she would remain in the region for at least three years. She returned to the U.K. in 2020.

=== 2021–Present ===
As of 2025, Ledbury is reported to have been fit with a Persistent Operational Deployed System (PODS) TEU container to trial Unmanned Underwater Vehicles (UUVs) such as REMUS and SEAFOX ROV autonomous systems.

In 2026, Ledbury supported the interception and seizure of Smyrtos, a Russian shadow fleet oil tanker in the English Channel.
