= 42 Commando =

Battalion sized formation of the Royal Marines

42 Commando Royal Marines
- Unit badge
- Active: 1943 – present
- Country: United Kingdom
- Branch: Royal Marines; Naval Service
- Type: Commando
- Size: One battalion
- Part of: UK Commando Force
- Garrison/HQ: Bickleigh Barracks, Devon
- Nicknames: Royals; Bootnecks; The Commandos; Jollies
- Mottos: Per Mare Per Terram (By Sea By Land) (Latin)
- Engagements: Falklands War; Operation Paraquet; Mount Kent Skirmish; Seizure of the Smyrtos

Commanders
- Current commander: Lt Col T J Quinn RM
- Captain-General: King Charles III (Captain-General, Royal Marines)

42 Commando is a unit within the UK Commando Force. Based at Norton Manor, Royal Marines Condor and 42 Commando are based at Bickleigh Barracks, Plymouth. Personnel regularly deploy outside the United Kingdom on operations or training. All Royal Marines personnel will have completed the Commando course at the Commando Training Centre (CTCRM) at Lympstone in Devon, entitling them to wear the green beret, with most attached personnel having completed the All Arms Commando Course.

== History ==
=== Second World War ===
Early Commando units were all from the British Army, but by February 1942, the Royal Marines were asked to organise Commando units of their own, and 6,000 men volunteered.

No. 42 (Royal Marine) Commando was raised in August 1943, under the command of Lieutenant Colonel Reginald Carteret de Mussenden Leathes from the 1st Royal Marine Battalion, as part of the expansion of the commandos. They were assigned to the 3rd Special Service Brigade and served in India and Burma in 1943–45, including operations in the Arakan and Assam. It took part in the third Arakan campaign and carried out a series of amphibious landings down the Burmese coastline. Including the landings at Myebon and the Battle of Hill 170. It then returned to India to prepare for Operation Zipper the invasion of British Malaya. The war ended before the operation began and the commando was diverted to reoccupy Hong Kong.

=== Post-Second World War ===
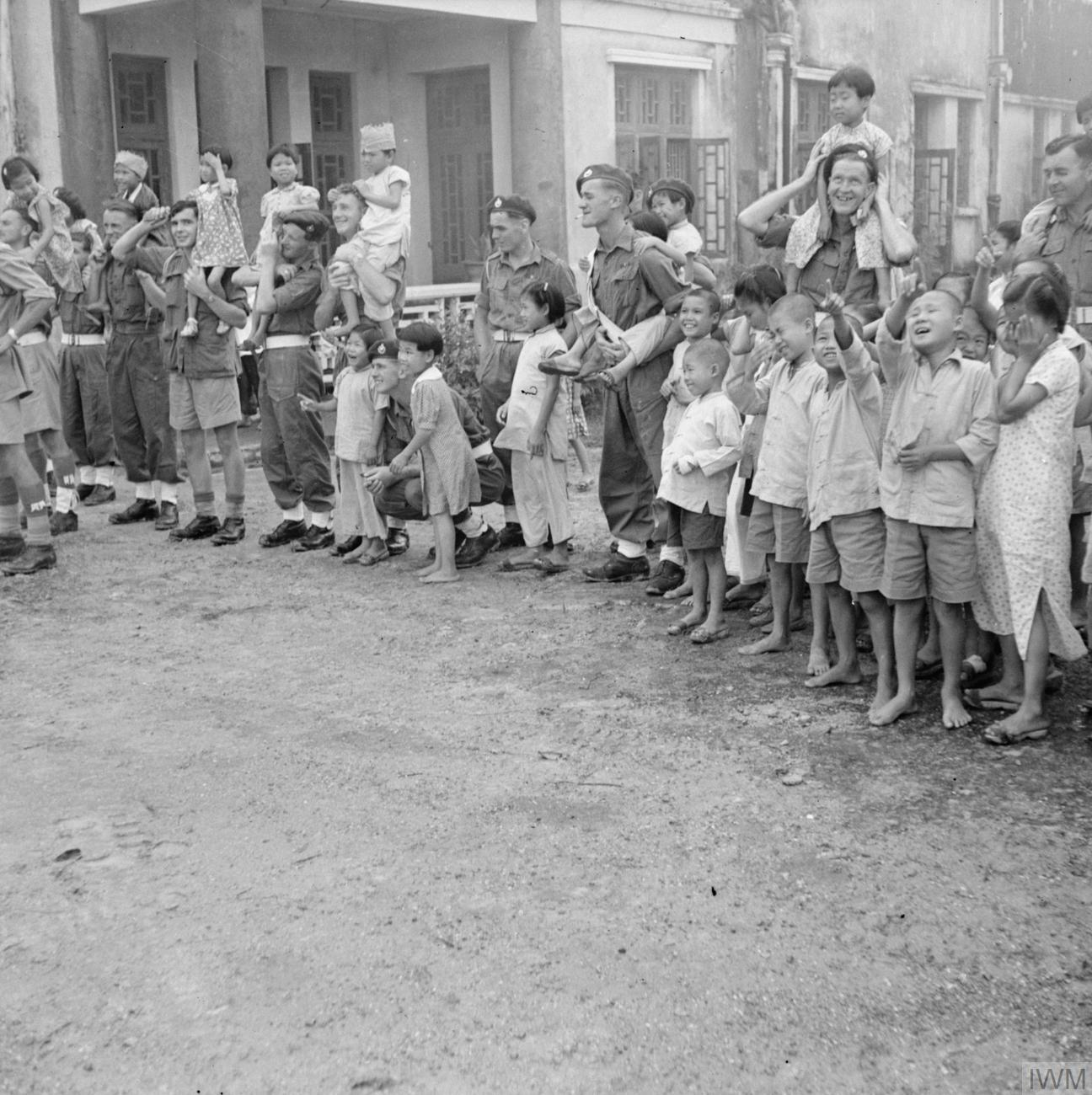
The British Reoccupation of Hong Kong in 1945: Men of 42 Marine Commando and children from the Tai Po Orphanage watch a fireworks display during a party hosted by the unit.

Following the Second World War 1st, 2nd and 4th commando brigades disbanded leaving only one brigade – the 3rd (40(RM), 42(RM) and 45(RM)). The Commando was involved in operations during the confrontation with Indonesia (Borneo). It was during this tour that the famous Limbang raid was conducted by Lima Company. Throughout the following decade it was based in Singapore at HMS Simbang (RNAS Sembawang).

=== Return to UK ===
After the return to the UK, the Commando was deployed to Northern Ireland, the New Hebrides in 1980 and exercised regularly overseas. More recently the Commando has seen operational service in South Georgia, Montserrat in 1995, Iraq and Afghanistan.

=== Falklands Conflict ===
In 1982, following the Argentine invasion of the Falkland Islands, the Commando deployed on Operation Corporate. On 21 May the Commando were Brigade reserve at San Carlos under Lt. Col. Nick Vaux RM. The unit was deployed to seize Mount Kent in a night move by helicopter. By 4 June the unit had moved forward, mostly under cover of darkness, to positions west of high ground overlooking Port Stanley and the last Argentine stronghold.

After days of probing reconnaissance, a Brigade assault took place on the night of 11/12 June in which the Commando's task was to secure Mount Harriet on the Brigade right flank. By moonlight and in freezing temperatures, 42 Commando moved undetected through enemy minefields in a 9 km (5.6 mi) right-flanking movement to surprise the enemy in their rear. Consecutive assaults by "K" and "L" Companies followed, up steep slopes onto company positions. Against strong resistance and continuous artillery bombardment, the Marines prevailed. By first light more than 30 enemy had been killed and over 300 prisoners taken as 42 Commando consolidated on Mount Harriet. 42 Commando suffered two fatalities themselves – one on Mount Harriet and one on Wall Mountain. For the bravery shown in the attack on Mount Harriet, 42 Commando was awarded one DSO, one Military Cross, four Military Medals and eight men were Mentioned in Dispatches.

=== 21st Century ===
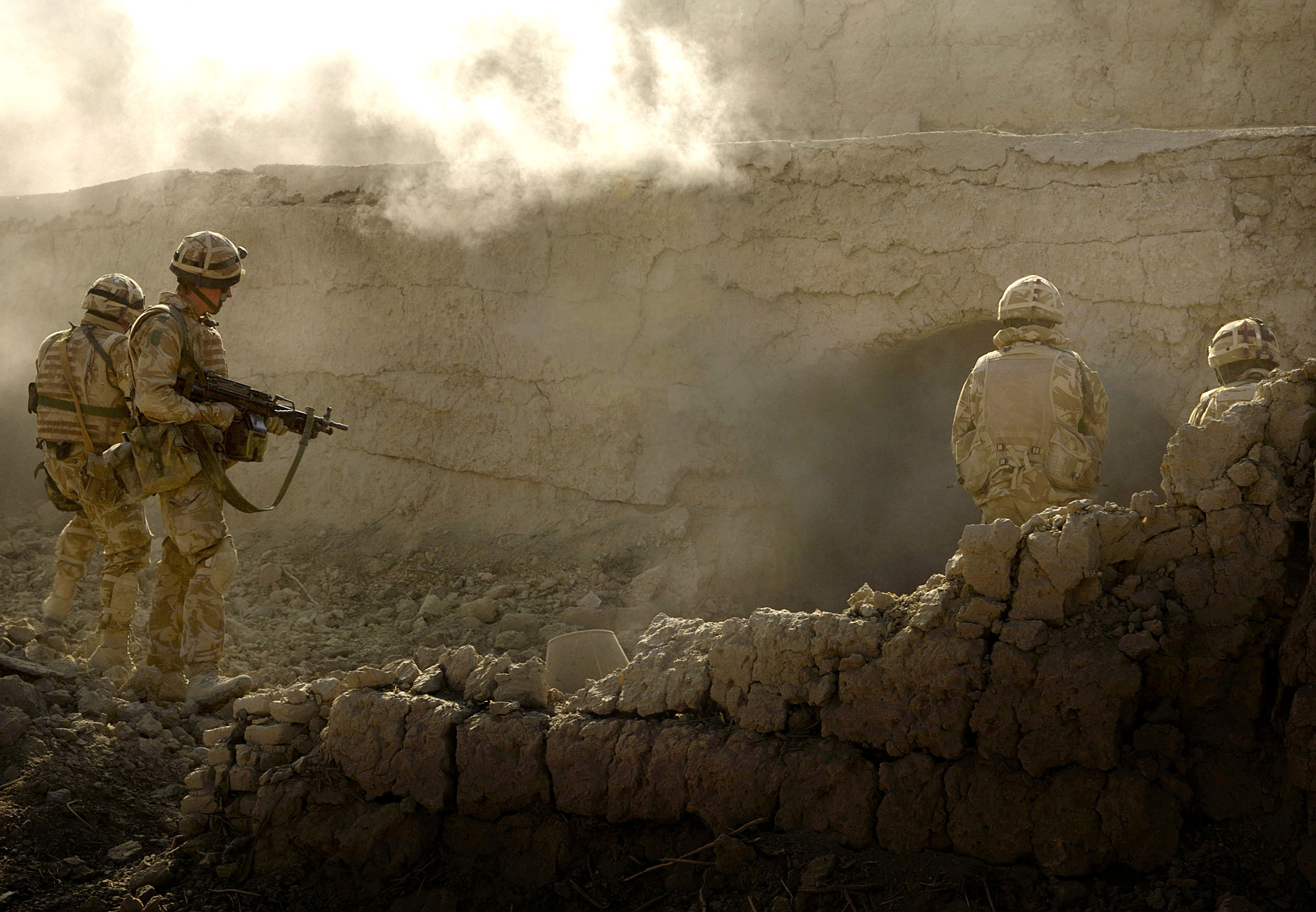
Mike Company of 42 Commando Royal Marines during Operation Volcano, Afghanistan in 2007.

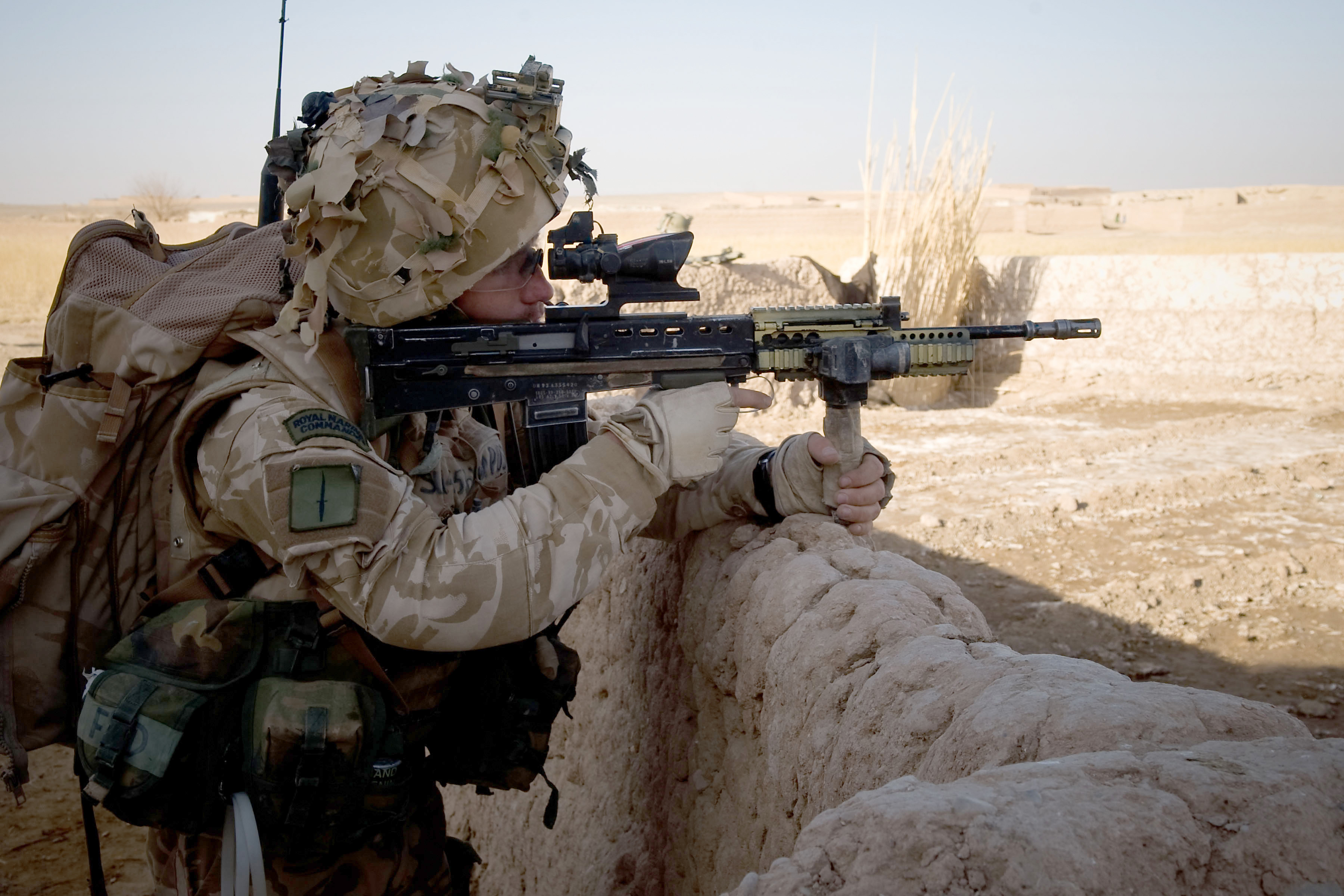
A Royal Marine from 42 Commando during Operation Sond Chara in Afghanistan, 2008.

The new millennium saw the Commando deploy on Operation Telic 1 for the invasion of Iraq in 2003 where they launched a helicopter assault on the Al-Faw Peninsula to support 40 Commando. The unit returned from Operation Herrick in Afghanistan on 16 April 2009, where it served as the Regional Battle Group (South). In May 2013, 42 Commando took over from 45 Commando as the lead Commando task group and deployed as part of the COUGAR 13 Response Force Task Group exercising in Albania and the Middle East.

In early July 2019, personnel from 42 Commando deployed by air to Gibraltar, in order to support the Gibraltar Government's detention of the Panama-flagged crude oil tanker Grace 1. The vessel was suspected of carrying oil to a Syrian refinery, in contravention of European Union sanctions against Syria. In March 2020, personnel of the unit worked with the Peacekeeping Company of the Belarusian 103rd Guards Airborne Brigade at the Losvido Training Areas during the two-week Exercise Winter Partisan.

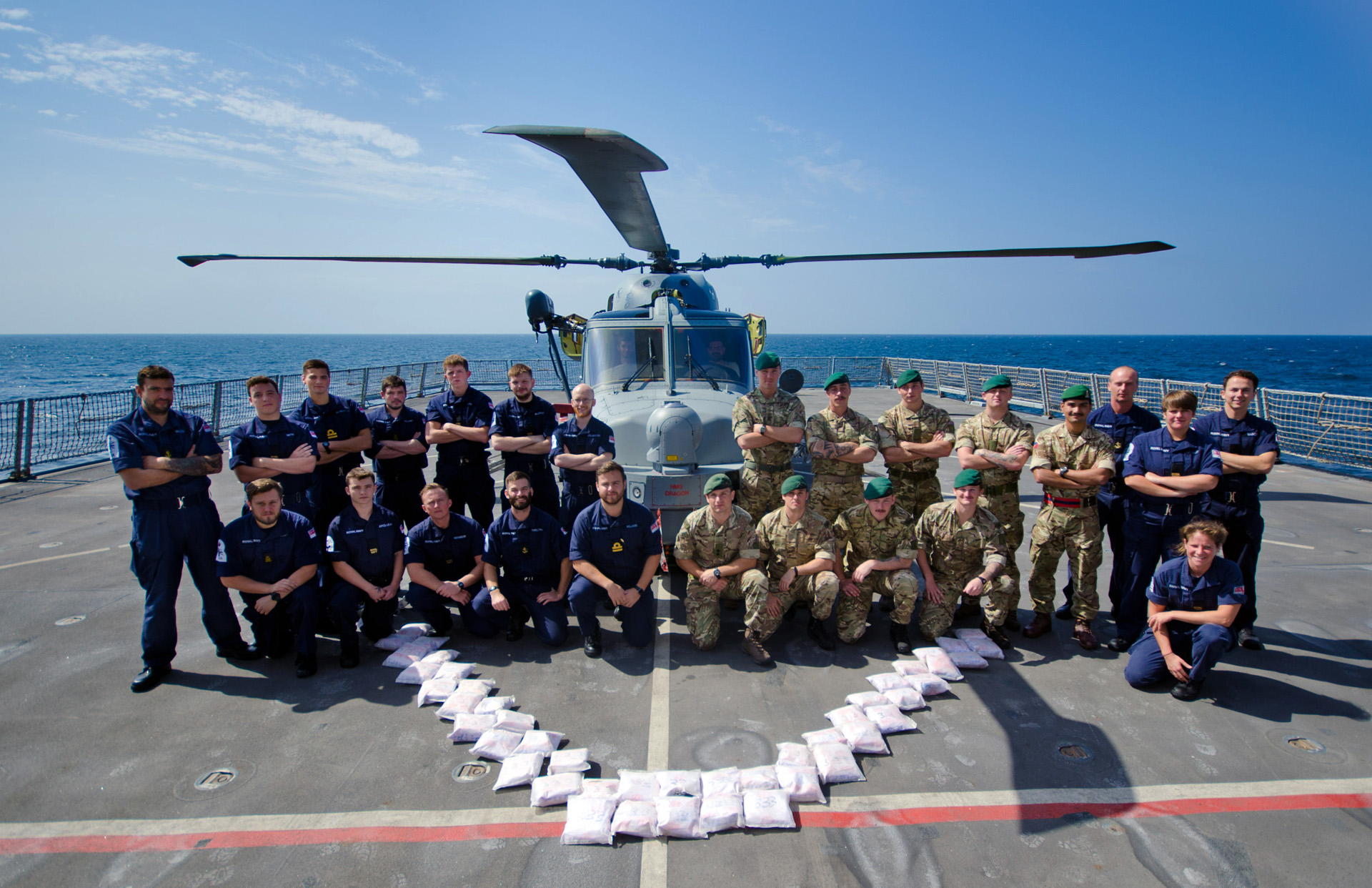
RMBT seizes 49kg of heroin in drugs bust

== Role ==
42 Commando is a Very High Readiness commando force capable of delivering special operations with a specific expertise in maritime operations including: high threat capacity-building and training of overseas partnered forces; Ships Force Protection Teams; training to indigenous forces; maritime interdiction and boarding operations; UK resilience and support to the Queen Elizabeth Class Carriers.

== Organisation ==
42 Commando comprises five companies:

- J (Juliet) Company
- K (Kilo) Company
- L (Lima) Company
- M (Mike) Company
- Support Company

Following the commando's re-role in 2018 the companies specialised as follows:

- J Company – Board and search specialists for counter-piracy and counter-narcotics operations (role transferred from 43 Commando under Project Sykes).
- K Company – Support, Augment, Liaise and Train (SALT) either other UK units, allied forces, or deployed on front-line operations.
- L Company – Joint Personnel Recovery; rescuing aircrew or fellow marines/soldiers who are isolated, missing, detained or captured in an operational environment, in particular fliers aboard HMS Queen Elizabeth.
- M Company – Ships Force Protection Teams (SFPT) for Royal Navy and RFA ships operating in high threat areas around the globe.

== Commanders ==
Commanders have included:

- 1948–1950 Lt. Col. Ian Riches
- 1963–1965 Lt. Col. Ian Gourlay
- 1965–1966 Lt. Col. Peter Whiteley
- 1970–1972 Lt. Col. John Richards
- 1972–1973 Lt. Col. Jeremy Moore
- Oct 75 – Apr 78 Lt Col TJM Wilson RM
- Apr 78 – Jun 80 Lt Col Henry Beverley OBE RM
- Jun 80 – Dec 81 Lt Col CHC Howgill RM
- Dec 81 – May 83 Lt Col Nick Vaux DSO RM
- May 83 – Dec 84 Lt Col Paul Stevenson MBE RM
- Dec 84 – Oct 86 Lt Col Van Der Horst RM
- Oct 86 – Jun 88 Lt Col RS Tailyour RM
- Jun 88 – Jul 90 Lt Col David Pennefather RM
- Jul 90 – Jul 92 Lt Col NM Robinson RM
- Jul 92 – May 94 Lt Col Robert Fulton RM
- May 94 – May 96 Lt Col AR Pillar RM
- May 96 – May 98 Lt Col RGT Lane RM
- May 98 – Dec 99 Lt Col RM Bowkett RM
- Dec 99 – Apr 01 Lt Col Andy Salmon RM
- Apr 01 – Nov 02 Lt Col DA Hook OBE RM
- Nov 02 – Jul 04 Lt Col Buster Howes OBE RM
- Jul 04 – Mar 06 Lt Col GM Salzano MBE RM
- Apr 06 – Jan 08 Lt Col MJ Holmes DSO RM
- Jan 08 – Oct 09 Lt Col CR Stickland OBE RM
- Oct 09 – Jan 12 Lt Col EA Murchison MBE RM
- Jan 12 – Jan 14 Lt Col N Sutherland MBE RM
- Jan 14 – Nov 15 Lt Col Richard Cantrill OBE MC RM
- Nov 15 – Dec 17 Lt Col Mark Totten MBE RM
- Dec 17 – Sept 19 Lt Col Ben Halstead MBE RM
- Sep 19 – Jun 21 Lt Col Doug Pennefather RM
- Jun 21 – Jan 23 Lt Col James Lewis OBE RM
- Jan 23 – Aug 24 Lt Col A N Pounds RM
- Aug 24 – Present Lt Col T J Quinn RM
