= List of people educated at St John's School, Leatherhead =

St. John's School, Leatherhead

This is a list of Old Johnians (abbreviated OJs), former pupils of St. John's School, Leatherhead, which is a public school in Surrey, England.

== A ==
- Richard Acworth (born 1936), Archdeacon of Wells from 1993 to 2003
- David Alesworth, (born 1957), artist based in Pakistan
- Rev. Hugh Ashdown (1904–1977), 8th Bishop of Newcastle

== B ==
- David Balcombe (born 1984), cricketer
- Edward Bannister (born 1942), former Commercial Court Judge of the Eastern Caribbean Supreme Court based in the BVI
- Thomas Barfett (1916–2000), Archdeacon of Hereford, Canon Residentiary at Hereford Cathedral between 1977 and 1982
- Robert Stanley Warren Bell (1871–1921), novelist, journalist and first editor of The Captain
- Rev. Anthony Bird (1931–2016), priest, physician and academic
- Rev. Jim Bishop (1908–1994), Suffragan Bishop of Malmesbury
- John Blair (born 1955), Professor of Medieval History and Archaeology at the University of Oxford and Fellow of Queen's College, Oxford
- Paul Boissier (1881–1953), former headmaster of Harrow School, wartime civil servant and cricketer
- John Westerdale Bowker (born 1935), Honorary Canon of Canterbury Cathedral, consultant to UNESCO, BBC broadcaster, author and editor
- Peter Bruinvels (born 1950), former Conservative MP
- Septimus Brutton (1869–1933), cricketer
- Sir Paul Bryan (1913–2004), former Conservative MP
- Rev. Mark Bryant (born 1949), 2nd Bishop of Jarrow
- John Burgess (1928–2015), Ireland Rugby International
- Ronald Burroughs (1917–1980), diplomat, Her Majesty's Ambassador to Algeria between 1971 and 1973
- Rupert Bursell (born 1942), barrister and priest

== C ==
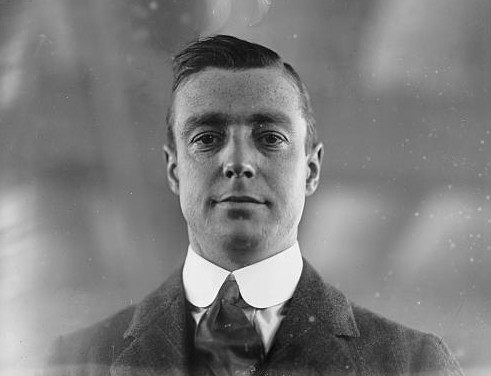
Walter Crawley

- Sir Henry Calley (1914–1997), senior officer in the RAF during World War II, local politician and owner of a stud farm
- Basil Fulford Lowther Clarke (1908–1978), priest and architectural historian
- Rear Admiral Christopher Clayton (born 1951), former senior officer in the Royal Navy
- Victor Clube (born 1934), first class cricketer and astrophysicist
- John Collinson (1911–1979), cricketer
- John Cook (1918–1984), composer, organist and church musician
- James Cope (born 1966), cricketer
- Alexander Cory (1890–1973), Archdeacon of the Isle of Wight
- Air Commodore James Baird Coward (1915–2012), senior officer in the Royal Air Force
- Walter Crawley (1880–1940), lawn tennis player who competed in the 1908 Summer Olympics
- Sir Peter Cresswell DL (born 1944), former judge of the High Court
- Joseph Campbell (Captain of Rugby 2022-23)

== D ==
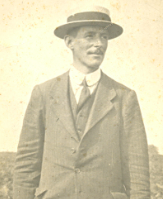
Lancelot Driffield

- Rev. Edward Darling (born 1933), Bishop of Limerick and Killaloe between 1985 and 2000
- Jenkin Alban Davies (1885–1976), Wales Rugby International
- Rev. Stephen Davies (1883–1961), Bishop of Carpentaria
- Giles Dilnot (born 1971), BBC Daily Politics Political Correspondent and co-presenter
- Wing Commander John Dowland (1914–1942), senior officer in the Royal Air Force who was awarded the GC
- Lancelot Driffield (1880–1917), cricketer
- Peter Drury (born 1967), football commentator
- Kenneth Durham (1954–2016), educator

== E ==
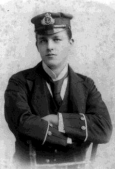
Paymaster J.T. Gedge

- Basil Ede (1931–2016), wildlife artist
- John Hugh David Eland (born 1941), chemist
- Mohamed A. El-Erian (born 1958), President of Queens' College, Cambridge, businessman
- John Mascal Evans (1915–1996), Archdeacon of Surrey between 1968 and 1980
- Arthur Evanson (1859–1934), England Rugby International
- Wyndham Evanson (1851–1934), England Rugby International
- Sir Anthony Ewbank (1925–2011), judge

== G ==
- Sir Richard Lavenham Gardner (born 1943), embryologist and geneticist
- Paymaster J.T. Gedge (1878–1914), first British officer to be killed in the First World War
- Nigel Glendinning (1929–2013), authority on Goya and 18th Century Spanish literature
- Rev. Ronald Goodchild (1910–1998), Bishop of Kensington between 1964 and 1980
- Geoffrey Grigson (1905–1985), poet, anthologist and critic
- Air Commodore John William Boldero "Jack" Grigson DSO, DFC & Two Bars (1893–1943), senior British officer in the Royal Air Force
- Sir Wilfrid Grigson (1896–1948), soldier, senior civil servant and colonial administrator

== H ==
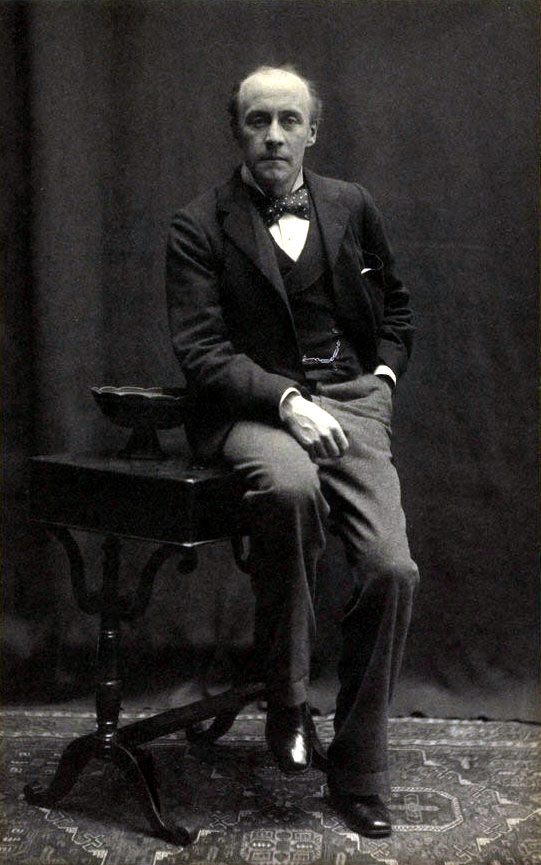
Sir Anthony Hope

- John Harvey (1911–1997), architectural historian
- Sir David Hatch (1939–2007), BBC Radio manager and producer
- Richard Haughton (born 1980), rugby sevens referee and former rugby union player
- Gavin Hewitt (born 1951), Europe Editor of BBC News
- Robert Lockhart Hobson (1872–1941), Keeper, Department of Oriental Antiquities and Ethnography at the British Museum
- George Hodges (1851–1921), Archdeacon of Sudbury
- Paymaster-Captain Basil Hood (1886–1941), senior officer in the Royal Navy
- Sir Anthony Hope (1863–1933), author of adventure novels such as The Prisoner of Zenda
- Major-General Malcolm Hunt (born 1938), Commanding Officer of 40 Commando RM during the Falklands War

== J ==
- Michael James (born 1934), cricketer
- Gwilliam Iwan Jones (1904–1995), photographer and anthropologist

== K ==
- George Kruis (born 1990), England Rugby International

== M ==
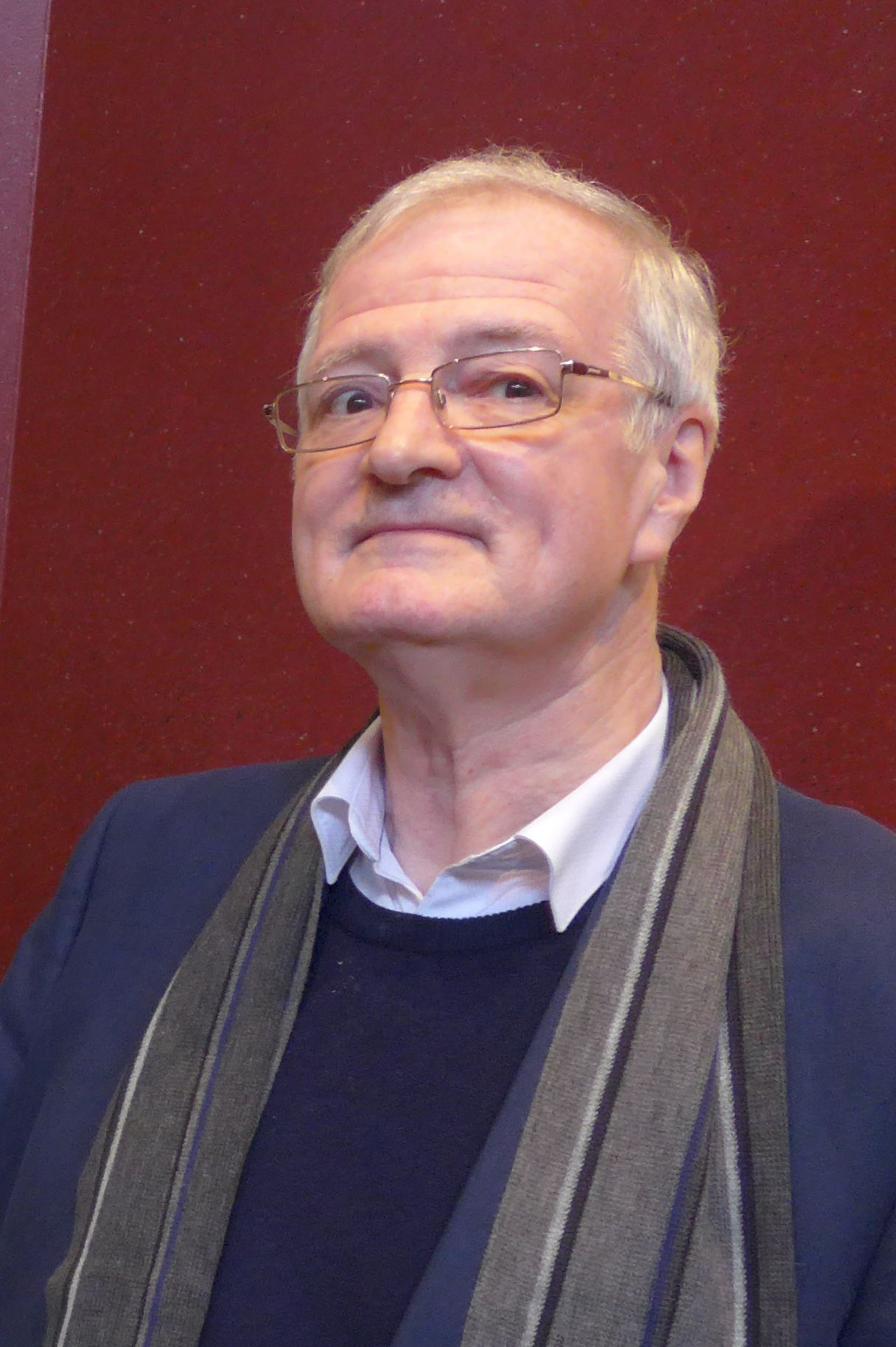
James Morwood

- Claudia MacDonald (born 1996), England Rugby International
- Alex Macqueen (born 1973), actor
- Rev. Morris Maddocks (1928–2008), bishop
- Humfrey Malins (born 1945), former Conservative MP
- Sir Arthur Wellington Marshall (1841–1918), High Sheriff of Cambridgeshire and Huntingdonshire in 1890
- Rev. Peter Jerome Marshall (born 1940), Dean of Worcester, 1997–2006, now Emeritus
- Christopher Matthews (1950–2004), businessman
- Air Vice Marshal Forster Herbert Martin "Sammy" Maynard (1893–1976), World War II flying ace
- Rev. John Methuen (1947–2010), Dean of Ripon between 1995 and 2005
- Guy Michelmore, composer and former news presenter
- Patrick Ferguson Millard (1902–1972), artist
- Roger Milner (1925–2014), actor, author and dramatist.
- Philip Morgan, cricketer, athlete, clergyman and educator
- James Morwood (1943–2017), classicist
- Jack Milton (Born 2008), Surrey Cricketer

== N ==
- L. Everard Napier (1888–1957), physician specialising in tropical medicine
- Lllewellyn Charles Nash (1868–1918), Ireland Rugby International
- Andrew Norriss (born 1947), author and TV sitcom writer

== P ==
- Rev. John Penfold (1864–1922), Dean of the Island and Bailiwick of Guernsey and its Dependencies
- Thomas Perkins (1870–1946), cricketer
- Sir Stephen Herbert Pierssené (1899–1966), General Director of Conservative Central Office between 1945 and 1957
- Denys Campion Potts (1923–2016), scholar and authority on French literature

== R ==
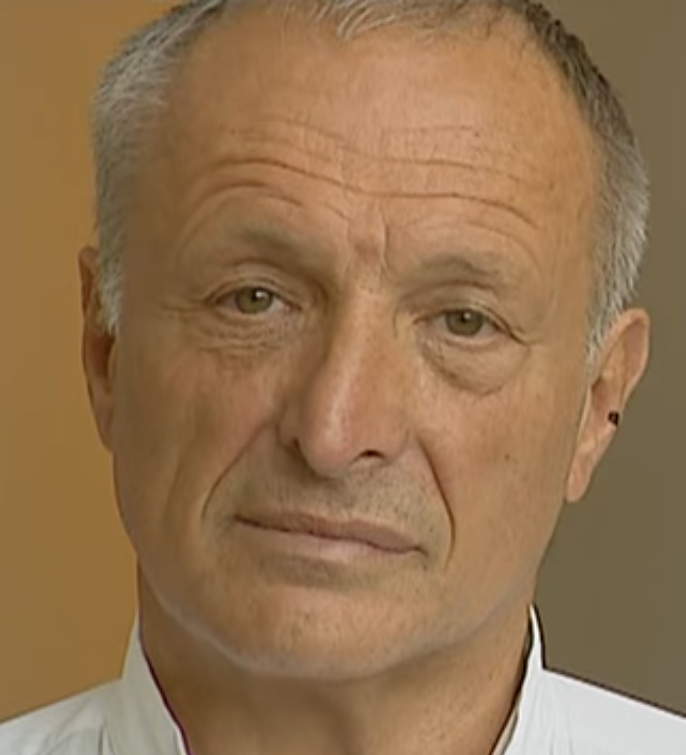
Lord Richard Rogers

- Rev. Vivian Redlich, missionary in Papua New Guinea when the Japanese invaded in 1942, beheaded in August that year
- Jonathan Rendall (1964–2013), author
- Lieutenant Commander Eric Gascoigne Robinson (1882–1965), awarded the Victoria Cross
- Lord Richard Rogers (1933–2021), architect
- Sir Robert Romer (1840–1918), judge
- Rev. David Rossdale (born 1953), former Bishop of Grimsby
- Squadron Leader Peter Rothwell (1920–2010), bomber pilot, key figure in the defence of Malta during World War II

== S ==
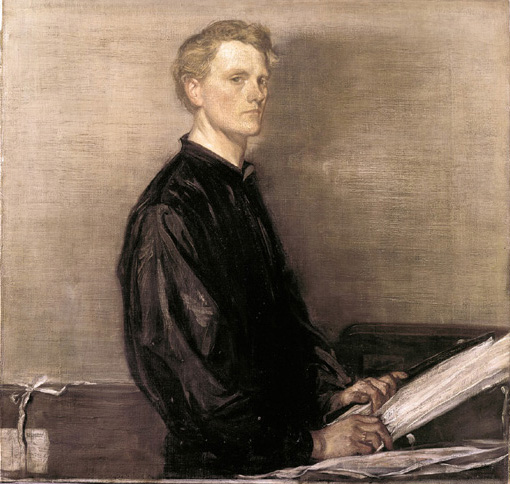
Charles Shannon

- Dr Louis Charles Arthur Savatard (1874–1962), dermatologist
- Lt. Col. Derek Seagrim (1903–1943), awarded the Victoria Cross
- Charles Haslewood Shannon (1863–1937), artist
- Rev. E.D. Shaw (1860–1937), cricketer and later Bishop of Buckingham
- Victor Silvester (1900–1978), dancer, musician and bandleader
- Nicholas Smith (1934–2015), actor
- Air Commodore Ian Stewart, senior officer in the Royal Air Force
- Claude Stokes (1875–1948), Indian Army officer, later diplomat
- Raymond Toole Stott (1910–1982), bibliographer, historian of the circus and its allied arts
- Patrick Sykes (1925–2014), England Rugby International
- Wymond Cory Symes (1867–1961), businessman, sportsman and member of the Bombay Legislative Council

== T ==
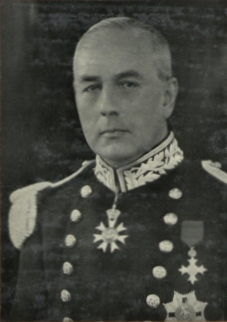
Sir Shenton Thomas

- Sir Thomas Shenton Whitelegge Thomas (1879–1962), last Governor of the Straits Settlements
- Simon Thomas (born 1973), former Blue Peter presenter
- John Henry Thorpe (1887–1944), Conservative MP
- Ryan Trevitt (born 2003), professional footballer
- Sir Sir Arthur Charles Trevor (1841–1920), senior civil servant and colonial administrator
- Dr. Robert Twycross (born 1941), Macmillan Clinical Reader in Palliative Medicine, Oxford University, 1988–2001, now Emeritus

== W ==
- Ted Ward (1919–2005), Archdeacon of Sherborne and Chaplain of the Royal Chapel in Windsor Great Park
- Sir Telford Waugh (1865–1950), diplomat
- John Wells (born 1939), Professor of Phonetics, University College London, 1988–2006, now Emeritus
- Edward Allan Wicks (1923−2010), Organist, Canterbury Cathedral, 1961–88
- William Williams (1866–1945), Wales Rugby International
- Rev. Leonard Wilson (1897–1970), priest, Bishop of Singapore 1941–49, Dean of Manchester 1949–53, Bishop of Birmingham 1953—69
- Mark Wilson (born 1946), Archdeacon of Dorking, 1996–2005
- Sir Wilfrid Wentworth Woods (1876–1947), colonial administrator
- Lieutenant Geoffrey Harold Woolley (1892–1968), the first Territorial Army officer to win the Victoria Cross
- Sir Leonard Woolley (1880–1960), archaeologist
