= Symes =

Symes is a surname. Notable people with the surname include:

- Beth Symes, Canadian lawyer
- Bob Symes (1924–2015), the stage name of inventor Robert Alexander Schutzmann
- Brad Symes (born 1985), Australian rules football midfielder
- Brian Symes (born 1952), former Australian rules footballer
- Carol Symes (born 1966), American medieval historian
- Cyril Symes (born 1943), Canadian politician
- Derval Symes, an Irish artist
- Ernie Symes (1892-1977), English professional football left back
- George Symes (disambiguation)
- Glasscott Richard Symes, an Irish rugby international
- Ivo Symes (1909-2002), New Zealand cricketer
- Jaclyn Symes, Australian politician
- James M. Symes (1897-1976), the 13th president of the Pennsylvania Railroad
- John Symes (disambiguation) - Wikipedia
- Kianu Kereru-Symes (born 1999), New Zealand rugby union player
- Lesle Symes (1925-1982), Australian librarian
- Marty Symes (1904-1953), American lyricist
- Michael Symes (diplomat) (1761-1809), Irish soldier, diplomat and politician
- Michael Symes (footballer) (born 1983), English footballer
- Maurice Symes, former New Zealand international lawn bowler
- Neil Symes (born 1988), Australian politician
- Osborne Symes (born 1937), Dominican civil servant and politician
- Peter Symes (born 1957), Australian researcher
- Robin Symes (1939-2023), British antiquities dealer and criminal
- Ruth Symes, an author of children's books
- Stewart Symes (1882-1962), British Army officer and colonial governor
- Sutton Symes (1679-1751), the Dean of Achonry from 1733
- Tom Copinger-Symes (born 1969), senior British Army officer
- Wymond Cory Symes (1867-1961), businessman, sportsman and member of the Bombay Legislative Council
