= James Coward =

James Coward may refer to:

- James Coward (composer) (1824–1880), 19th century British composer and organist
- James Coward (RAF officer) (1915–2012), Royal Air Force officer, Commandant of the Air Training Corps, 1962–1966
