= British forces in the Falklands War =

British forces in the Falklands War can be:

- British naval forces in the Falklands War
- British ground forces in the Falklands War
- British air services in the Falklands War
