= Old Johnians =

Former students of the following education establishments are referred to as Old Johnians

- Hurstpierpoint College
- St John's School, Leatherhead
