= Falklands War order of battle: British ground forces =

This is a list of British ground forces in the Falklands War. For a list of ground forces from Argentina, see Falklands War order of battle: Argentine ground forces

== Land Forces ==
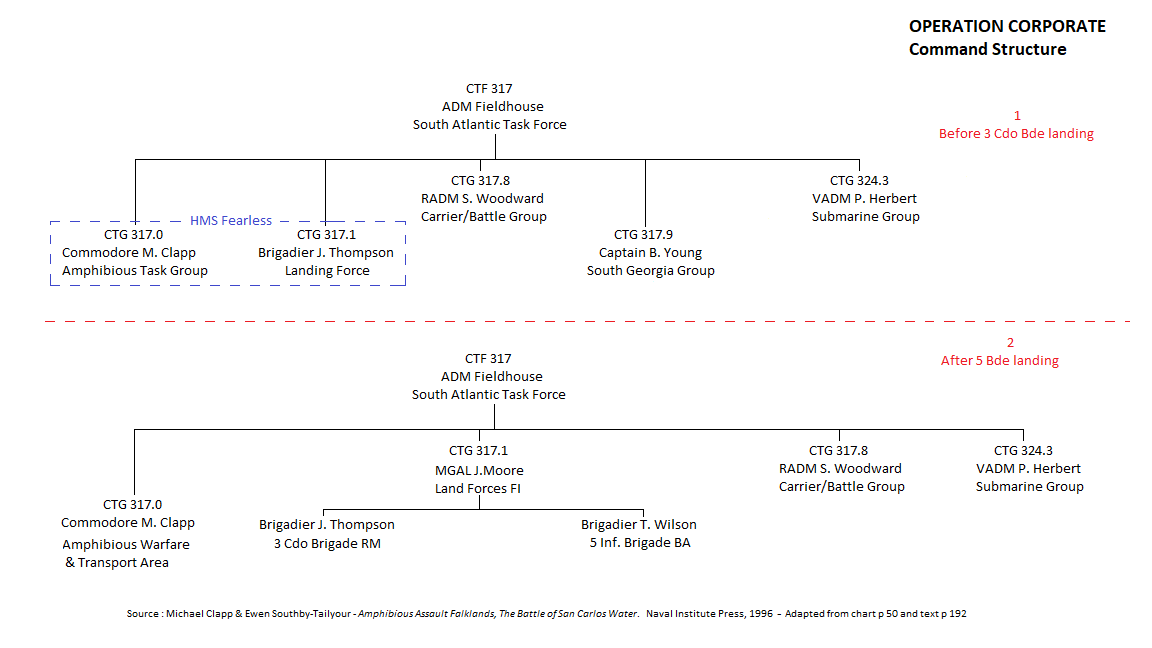
Operation Corporate command structure 1982

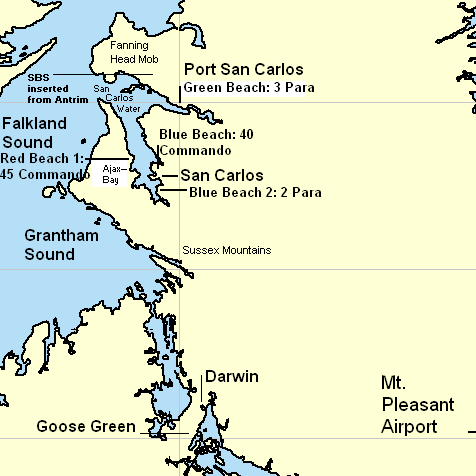
D-day at San Carlos

The land forces employed by the United Kingdom during the Falklands War amounted to a divisional sized formation, named as Land Forces Falkland Islands, consisting of two brigades:

- 3 Commando Brigade - formed primarily by the Royal Marines, 3 Commando Brigade was the primary British rapid reaction force, tasked with reinforcing the NATO northern flank in Norway in the event of war with the Soviet Union in Europe. 3 Commando Brigade was the only formation with experience of amphibious operations. In its NATO role, 3 Commando Brigade was reinforced by the Dutch Korps Mariniers. However, the situation required reinforcement by British units, so 2nd & 3rd Battalions of the Parachute Regiment were reassigned from 5 Infantry Brigade.
- 5 Infantry Brigade - a home defence brigade and the UK's main "out of area" reaction formation, tasked with operations outside the European theatre. It would normally be formed with two battalions of the Parachute Regiment and the UK based Gurkha battalion. However, since both 2 PARA and 3 PARA had augmented 3 Commando Brigade, 5 Brigade was reconstituted with two battalions of Foot Guards then on public duties in London along with its Gurkha battalion. These were chosen since they were immediately available, as they were in UK and neither on nor preparing for internal security duties in Northern Ireland.

=== Land Forces HQ ===
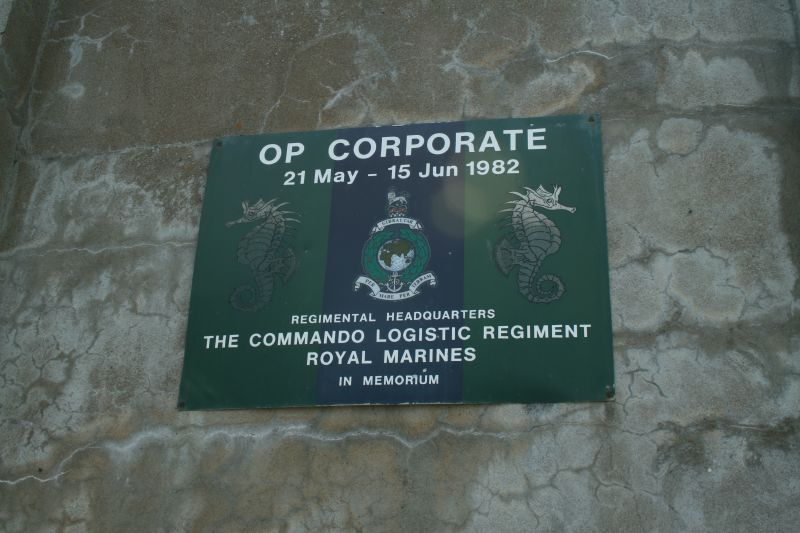
Memorial plaque to the Commando Logistic Regiment at Ajax Bay,

- Commander, Land Forces, Falkland Islands (CLFFI): Major-General JJ Moore, Royal Marines
- Deputy commander: Brigadier CJ Waters
- Commander, Royal Artillery: Colonel BT Pennicott

==== 3 Commando Brigade ====
Commander: Brigadier JHA Thompson

- 29 Commando Regiment Royal Artillery (Lt Col MJ Holroyd Smith)
  - 7th (Sphinx) Battery Royal Artillery / 105 mm L118 Light Guns x 6 Land Rover 101 Forward Control x 6 Land Rover series IIA x 6
  - 8th (Alma) Battery Royal Artillery / 105 mm L118 Light Guns x 6 Land Rover 101 Forward Control x 6 Land Rover series IIA x 6
  - 29th Field Battery Royal Artillery / 105 mm L118 Light Guns x 6
  - 79th (Kirkee) Battery Royal Artillery / 105 mm L118 Light Guns x 6 Land Rover 101 Forward Control x 6 Land Rover series IIA x 6
  - 148th (Meiktila) Battery (Naval Gunfire Support Forward Observation (NGSFO))
- 40 Commando, Royal Marines (Lt Col MPJ Hunt) — San Carlos - Sapper Hill. (†1)
- 42 Commando, Royal Marines (Lt Col NF Vaux) — Mount Kent - Mount Harriet. (†2)
- 45 Commando, Royal Marines (Lt Col AF Whitehead) — Ajax Bay - Douglas Settlement - Two Sisters. (†12)
- 2nd Battalion, Parachute Regiment (Lt Col H Jones VC)^{^1} — San Carlos - Goose Green & Darwin - Wireless Ridge. (†18)
- 3rd Battalion, Parachute Regiment (Lt Col HWR Pike) — Port San Carlos - Teal Inlet - Mount Longdon. (†21)
  - 29th Field Battery RA
  - 43 (Lloyds) Air Defence Battery
    - 1st troop / Blowpipe x 6、Leyland 4-tonne truck x 6
    - 2nd troop / Blowpipe x 6、Leyland 4-tonne truck x 6
    - 3rd troop / Blowpipe x 6、Leyland 4-tonne truck x 6
  - 9 Parachute Squadron Royal Engineers (†4)
  - 10th Field Troop, / Land Rover 101FC Ambulance x 16
  - 613 Tactical Air Control Party

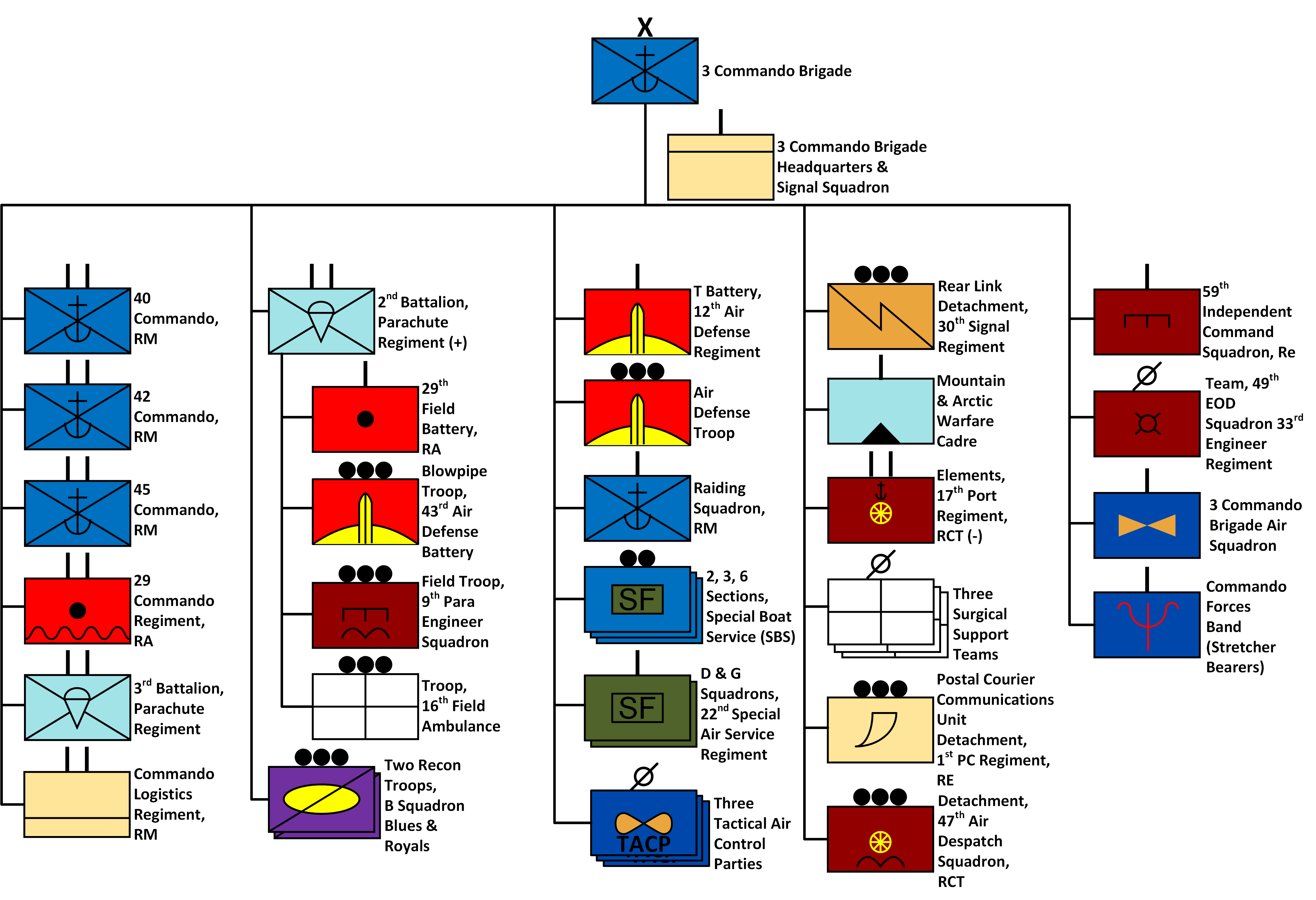
Task organization of UK 3 Commando Brigade in Falklands War

- Commando Logistic Regiment, Royal Marines (Lt Col IJ Hellberg) (†1) Bedford MK UBRE (Unit Bulk Refuelling Equipment) x9 comprising (Civgas x5, Dieso x3, AVCAT x1), ROF Nottingham Eager Beaver Air Portable Fork Lift Truck (APFLT) x8, Can-Am motorcycles x8
- 3 Commando Brigade HQ and Signal Squadron (Maj R Dixon) (†1)
  - Air Defence Troop / Blowpipe Missile launchers x 12 Leyland 4-tonne truck x 12 Land Rover 109 series III x 12
  - 604 Tactical Air Control Party
  - 605 Tactical Air Control Party
  - 612 Tactical Air Control Party
  - Y Troop Royal Marines (electronic warfare)
- 3 Commando Brigade Air Squadron (Major CP Cameron) / 9 x Gazelle AH.1 helicopters (†3) 6 x Scout helicopters (†1)
- Two troops B Squadron Blues and Royals / FV101 Scorpion x 4、FV107 Scimitar x 4、FV106 Samson x 1
- T Battery (Shah Sujah's Troop) Royal Artillery 12 Air Defence Regiment / Rapier Missile FS.A Launcher x 12、Land Rover 101 Forward Control x 12
- 1st Raiding Squadron, Royal Marines (Capt Chris Baxter) / Rigid Raiding Craft x 17
- Mountain and Arctic Warfare Cadre, Royal Marines (Capt Rod Boswell)
- SBS (Maj Jonathan Thomson) 67 men (†1)
  - 2nd, 3rd and 6th Sections
- 22 SAS (Lt Col HM Rose) 107 men (†19)
  - D and G Squadrons
- Rear Link (satellite) detachment (TSC 502), 30 Signal Regiment
- Elements of 17 Port Regiment Royal Corps of Transport
  - 3 x Mexeflote detachments.
  - 5 x Landing ship logistics detachments.
  - 2 x FV 4018 Centurion BARV
- 3 x Surgical support teams
- Postal courier communications unit detachment of 2 PC Regiment RE, 20 PC Sqn RE (tasked 3 CDO Bde support) & 21 PC Sqn RE (tasked 5 Airborne Bde support)
- Detachment 47 Air Despatch Squadron RCT.
- 59 Independent Commando Squadron Royal Engineers (Maj Roderick Macdonald). (†3)
  - 2 Troop 9 Parachute Squadron Royal Engineers (Capt Robbie Burns)
- Detachment 49 EOD Squadron, 33 Engineer Regiment Royal Engineers (†1)
  - 2 man bomb disposal team
- Commando Forces Band (stretcher-bearers)

^1 - Replaced by Lt Col David Chaundler

==== 5th Infantry Brigade ====
Commander: Brigadier MJA Wilson

- Headquarters 5th Infantry Brigade
- 5 Infantry Brigade Signal Squadron (205) Royal Signals (Major Mike Forge) (†1)
- 2nd Battalion, Scots Guards (Lt Col MIE Scott) — Mount Tumbledown. (†8)
- 1st Battalion, Welsh Guards (Lt Col JF Rickett) — Sapper Hill. (†33)
- 1st Battalion, 7th Duke of Edinburgh's Own Gurkha Rifles (Lt Col DPdeC Morgan) — Mount William. (†1)
- 97 (Lawson's Company) Battery Royal Artillery (of 4 Field Regiment RA, see below)
  - 6 x 105 mm L118 Light Guns
  - 6 x Land Rover 101 Forward Control
  - 6 x Land Rover 109
- 4 Field Regiment, RA (HQ, 29th and 97th Batteries)
- 36 Engineer Regiment RE (Lt Col G Field OBE (CRE))
- 9 Parachute Squadron RE (Maj CM Davis)
- 11 Field Squadron RE (Maj Bruce Hawken) arrived San Carlos 25 May under command 3 Commando Brigade Royal Marines. They switched to under command CO 36 Engineer Regiment (as Divisional troops) when they landed around 2 June
- 61 Field Support Squadron RE (Maj Taffy Morgan)
- 1 x Field Troop, 20 Field Squadron RE (att 9 Para Sqn RE) (Capt D Foxley)
- STRE
- Postal section
- 656 Squadron Army Air Corps (†2) Gazelle helicopter × 6 Scout Helicopter × 6
- 10 Field Workshop Royal Electrical and Mechanical Engineers (†3) / Land Rover 101FC Ambulance × 16 Land Rover 88 series III × 16
- 81 Ordnance Company Royal Army Ordnance Corps
- 91 Ordnance Company Royal Army Ordnance Corps
- Tactical Air Control Party (Forward Air Control) x 2
- Army Catering Corps (†4)
- 407 Troop, Royal Corps of Transport, (2Lt Ash)
- 63 Squadron RAF Regiment
  - 8 x Rapier Missile FS.A Launchers and Blindfire radar, FSA, DN181.
  - 8 x Land Rover 101 Forward Control
  - 8 x Land Rover 109
  - 8 x Bandvagn 202
  - 518 Company, Royal Pioneer Corps

== Infantry weapons ==
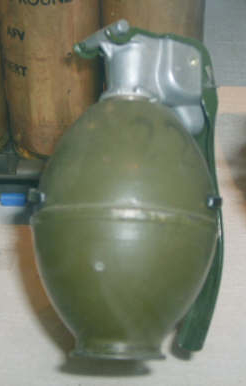
A L2-A2 fragmentation grenade

- L9A1 Browning
- L1A1 SLR (main infantry weapon)
- L42A1 (Sniper rifle)
- L2-A2 (Hand grenade)
- M79 (infantry grenade launcher)
- L4A3 Bren
- L7A2 GPMG
- L14A1 Carl Gustav Recoilless Rifle
- Rocket 66mm HEAT L1A1
- MILAN ATGM (used against Argentine bunkers)
- L16A1 81 mm Mortar
- Blowpipe MANPADS (infantry use)
- FIM-92 Stinger MANPADS (special forces use)
- M16A1 & M203 (special forces weapon)
- CAR-15 (special forces weapon)
- L2A3 Sterling (support services weapon i.e. for tank crewmen, engineers and artillerymen, some troops within RN Commando Regiment)

== See also ==
- Falklands War order of battle: British air forces
- Falklands War order of battle: British naval forces

== Sources ==
- The Battle For The Falklands, Max Hastings and Simon Jenkins, 1983, Michael Joseph Ltd., ISBN 0-330-35284-9
- The Official History of the Falklands Campaign, Sir Lawrence Freedman, 2005, Routledge, ISBN 0-7146-5207-5
