= Peter Cresswell =

Peter Cresswell may refer to:

- Peter Cresswell (immunologist), British immunologist
- Peter Cresswell (judge) (1944–2025), English High Court judge
