= John Collinson =

John Collinson may refer to:

- John Collinson (cricketer) (1911–1979), English cricketer
- John Collinson (historian) (died 1793), historian of Somerset
