= Jon Chitty =

RAF officer

Air Commodore Jon Chitty, OBE RAF, was Commandant of the Air Training Corps (ATC) from 3 May 2002 until July 2005.

== Biography ==
Air Commodore Jon Chitty was brought up and educated in Sheffield. He attended King Edward VII School (photo) and left with an RAF Scholarship to undertake an Aeronautical Engineering degree at Imperial College London from 1971 to 1974.

He then undertook officer and specialist training at RAF College Cranwell during the following year. His first posting was to RAF Kinloss as Officer Commanding Armament Servicing Flight supporting the 3 Nimrod Squadrons. Postings to RAF Gutersloh and RAF Wattisham followed before he was posted to DSGT at Cranwell as an instructor.

He left on promotion a year later to command the Armament Engineering Squadron at RAF Coningsby and was the project officer for the introduction to service of the Tornado F2. A range of tours at RAF Stanley (Falkland Islands), HQ Strike Command and RAF Wattisham were followed by promotion to Wing Commander and a return to Strike Command to lead the Tornado Role Office in September 1989.

His involvement in the fleet support and modification programmes for the Tornado squadrons involved in the Gulf War led to his award of the OBE in the Gulf War Honours list. He then attended the Advanced Staff Course at Bracknell before his posting to RAF Bruggen as Officer Commanding Engineering and Supply Wing. At the end of a busy 3 years in Germany, he was promoted to group captain and posted to the DD Weapons (RAF) appointment at RAF Wyton. He served 4 years in post before moving to the Ordnance Board as the Air Strike Division Leader in December 1999.

This tour as the UK specialist for the provision of independent safety and suitability for service advice for all air-launched and ground-based air defence munitions, also involved taking the UK-lead for Insensitive Munitions nationally and internationally. He left the newly formed Defence Ordnance Safety Group to take up the dual-appointment of Air Officer Commanding Air Cadets and Commandant of the Air Training Corps, at the RAF College Cranwell, on 3 May 2002.

The appointments of Air Officer Commanding Air Cadets and Commandant ATC were split on 24 March 2003 with the former appointment passed to the Chief Executive of the Royal Air Force Training Group Defence Agency and the latter becoming Commandant Air Cadets.

Jon is an Advanced Instructor in scuba diving and upon leaving the Royal Air Force at the end of this tour, he founded a scuba diving equipment design and manufacture company, Venture Diving. Venture Diving has designed and brought the innovative Tank2Go twinset trolley and carrier to market. Jon also works as a consultant for a number of aerospace organisations.

Preceded by John Kennedy	Air Officer Commanding Air Cadets; 2002–2003	Succeeded by David Walker
Preceded by John Kennedy	Commandant Air Cadets; 2002–2005	Succeeded by David Harrison
