= Stephen Herbert Pierssené =

Sir Stephen Herbert Pierssené
- Born: 9 August 1899
- Died: 29 January 1966 (aged 66)
- Education: St John's School, Leatherhead
- Alma mater: Royal Military Academy Sandhurst

Sir Stephen Herbert Pierssené (9 August 1899 - 29 January 1966) was General Director of Conservative Central Office between 1945 and 1957 and credited with reviving the Conservative Party’s fortunes in the years following World War II. In conjunction with Frederick Marquis, 1st Earl of Woolton, he was instrumental in the successful re-election of Winston Churchill as prime minister in 1951.

Pierssené’s obituary in The Times described him as ‘a modest and painstaking man, with shrewd judgment, a voracious appetite for work and a flair for organization’.

== Life ==
Stephen Herbert Pierssené was born on 9 August 1899, the son of the Rev. R. Pierssené of Chandler’s Ford, Hampshire. He was educated at St John's School, Leatherhead and the Royal Military College, Sandhurst. He was commissioned into the Queen's Royal Regiment and served in France towards the end of World War I where he was wounded. He later joined the Intelligence Corps before resigning his commission in 1922 with the rank of Lieutenant-Colonel and was after appointed Conservative Party agent at Rugby.

In 1930, Pierssené was appointed Conservative Central Party agent for Yorkshire. He resigned this position in 1935 to enter business with Brotherton & Co., a chemical manufacturer based in Leeds. He became a director of the firm in 1936, the same year in which he joined the Territorial Army. During World War II he was brigade major of anti-aircraft brigades in Orkney and Coventry before commanding an anti-aircraft regiment.

After World War II he returned to politics. In 1947 Pierssené was appointed general director of Conservative Central Office by Ralph Assheton, 1st Baron Clitheroe. In conjunction with Frederick Marquis, 1st Earl of Woolton, he was instrumental in the re-election of Winston Churchill as prime minister in 1951. He remained general director until 1957 when he retired on the grounds of ill health.

In 1927, Pierssené married Avice Bullock, with whom he had two sons. He married, secondly, Maureen Ava Suttie, with whom he had a daughter. Sir Stephen Pierssené died on 29 January 1966 at the age of 66.
