= Commandant Air Cadets =

Commandant Royal Air Force Air Cadets
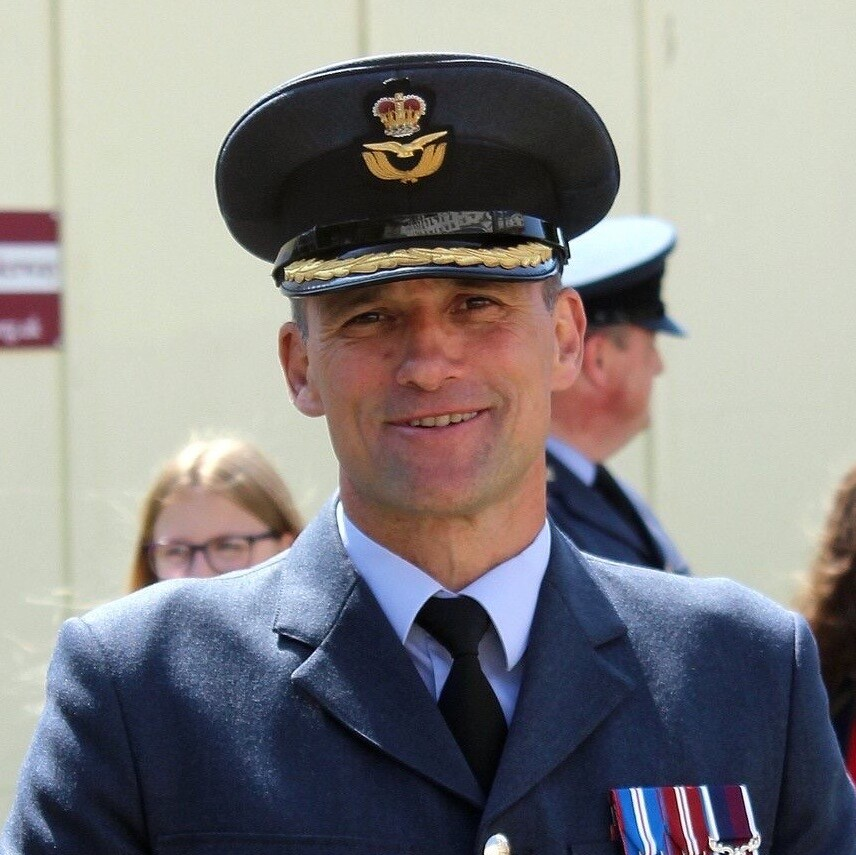
- Incumbent; Air Commodore Allen 'Al' Lewis since 23 September 2024
- Abbreviation: Comdt RAFAC
- Reports to: AOC No. 22 Group RAF
- First holder: John Adrian Chamier
- Unofficial names: Commandant Air Cadets

Commandant Royal Air Force Air Cadets is the title given to the Royal Air Force officer who is responsible for running the Royal Air Force Air Cadets, embracing the Air Training Corps (ATC) and the RAF Sections of the Combined Cadet Force (CCF RAF). The current Commandant RAF Air Cadets is Air Commodore Allen Lewis, who assumed the post in September 2024.

Previously known as Commandant ATC, the appointment is now held by an RAF Air Commodore and is based at Headquarters Air Cadets (HQAC) at RAF Cranwell. Prior to the establishment of HQAC as an independent unit, the post of Commandant ATC was held by the Air Officer Commanding-in-Chief, Reserve, Home and finally Flying Training Command. HQAC was formed 1 May 1960 within Flying Training Command.

The Commandant is responsible for over 1000 units of the ATC, 199 CCF (RAF) Sections and the nationwide network of Volunteer Gliding Squadrons (VGS).

Until 24 March 2003, the Commandant also held the role of Air Officer Commanding Air Cadets, the appointment then passing to the Air Officer Commanding Training Group (TG). The post has now been merged into the post of AOC TG and no longer exists as a separate entity.

== AOC Air Cadets and Commandant ATC 1941 – 2003 ==
| Picture | Commandant Air Cadets | Took office | Left office | Time in office | Ref. |
|---|---|---|---|---|---|
| Sir John Adrian Chamier (Ret'd) | Air Commodore; Sir John Adrian Chamier (Ret'd) | 5 February 1941 | 31 January 1944 | 2 years, 11 months | |
| Sir Ernest Leslie Gossage (Ret'd) | Air Marshal; Sir Ernest Leslie Gossage (Ret'd) | 1 February 1944 | 31 December 1945 | 1 year, 10 months | |
| Appointments held byAir Officer Commanding-in-Chief Reserve / Home / Flying Training Command | Appointments held by Air Officer Commanding-in-Chief Reserve / Home / Flying Training Command | 1946 | February 1960 | 14 years, 1 month | |
| Antony G Dudgeon | Air Commodore; Antony G Dudgeon | February 1960 | 13 September 1962 | 2 years, 7 months | |
| James Baird Coward | Air Commodore; James Baird Coward | 14 September 1962 | 22 June 1966 | 3 years, 9 months | |
| Edward J Morris | Air Commodore; Edward J Morris | 23 June 1966 | 17 June 1968 | 1 year, 11 months | |
| John N Stacey | Air Commodore; John N Stacey | 18 June 1968 | 16 July 1971 | 3 years | |
| Percy O V Green | Air Commodore; Percy O V Green | 17 July 1971 | 12 October 1973 | 2 years, 2 months | |
| Thomas H Blackham | Air Commodore; Thomas H Blackham | 13 October 1973 | 12 June 1977 | 3 years, 7 months | |
| Michael J E Swiney | Air Commodore; Michael J E Swiney | 13 June 1977 | 14 December 1979 | 2 years, 6 months | |
| Kenneth J Goodwin | Air Commodore; Kenneth J Goodwin | 15 December 1979 | 16 April 1982 | 2 years, 4 months | |
| P V Mayall | Air Commodore; P V Mayall | 17 April 1982 | 5 January 1986 | 3 years, 8 months | |
| P P W Taylor | Air Commodore; P P W Taylor | 6 January 1986 | 4 January 1987 | 11 months | |
| Peter G Naz | Air Commodore; Peter G Naz | 5 January 1987 | April 1990 | 3 years, 2 months | |
| Richard P Skelley | Air Commodore; Richard P Skelley | April 1990 | 22 April 1993 | 3 years | |
| Peter M Stean | Air Commodore; Peter M Stean | 23 April 1993 | 11 January 1996 | 2 years, 8 months | |
| Jon A F Ford | Air Commodore; Jon A F Ford | 12 January 1996 | 27 March 1998 | 2 years, 2 months | |
| John D Kennedy | Air Commodore; John D Kennedy | 28 March 1998 | 2 May 2002 | 4 years, 1 month | |
| Jon P Chitty | Air Commodore; Jon P Chitty | 3 May 2002 | 23 March 2003 | 10 months | |

== Air Officer Commanding Air Cadets 2003 – 2005 ==
| Picture | Air Officer Commanding Air Cadets | Took office | Left office | Time in office | Ref. |
|---|---|---|---|---|---|
| David Walker | Air Vice-Marshal; David Walker | 23 March 2003 | 3 January 2005 | 1 year, 286 days | |
| John Ponsonby | Air Vice-Marshal; John Ponsonby | 4 January 2005 | 2005 | 11 months | |

== Commandant RAF Air Cadets 2003 – present ==
| Picture | Commandant Air Cadets | Took office | Left office | Time in office | Ref. |
|---|---|---|---|---|---|
| Jon P Chitty | Air Commodore; Jon P Chitty | 24 March 2003 | July 2005 | 2 years, 3 months | |
| David Harrison | Air Commodore; David Harrison | July 2005 | 12 October 2006 | 1 year, 3 months | |
| Gordon Moulds CBE | Air Commodore; Gordon Moulds CBE | 13 October 2006 | 19 May 2008 | 1 year, 219 days | |
| Ian R W Stewart | Air Commodore; Ian R W Stewart | 20 May 2008 | 31 May 2010 | 2 years, 11 days | |
| Barbara Cooper CBE | Air Commodore; Barbara Cooper CBE | 1 June 2010 | 16 August 2012 | 2 years, 76 days | |
| Dawn McCafferty CBE | Air Commodore; Dawn McCafferty CBE | 17 August 2012 | 14 July 2020 | 7 years, 332 days | |
| John Lawlor | Group Captain; John Lawlor; Acting | 15 July 2020 | 20 September 2020 | 67 days | |
| Anthony Keeling OBE | Air Commodore; Anthony Keeling OBE | 21 September 2020 | 23 September 2024 | 4 years, 2 days | |
| Allen Lewis | Air Commodore; Allen Lewis | 23 September 2024 | | 1 year, 349 days | |
