= Louis Charles Arthur Savatard =

Dr Louis Charles Arthur Savatard Hon.M.Sc., L.S.A. (26 January 1874 – 18 January 1962) was a renowned dermatologist, working principally at the Manchester and Salford Hospital for Diseases of the Skin. He was also a lecturer in dermatology at the University of Manchester.

== Life ==
Savatard was born at Leighton Buzzard on 26 January 1874, the son of the Rev. Louis Savatard. He was educated at St John's School, Leatherhead, and after a brief spell in the City at Lloyd's of London he entered Guy's Hospital as a medical student in 1894.

Savatard then studied practical anatomy at Owens College, Manchester where he was a medallist. His work at the Manchester and Salford Hospital for Diseases of the Skin began in 1901 and he continued there as Honorary Physician from 1907 until his death.

Savatard's specialism was cancer of the skin. He was made honorary consulting dermatologist to the Christie Cancer Hospital and the Holt Radium Institute. In 1930 he gave evidence before the Home Office Departmental Committee in respect of skin cancers affecting workers in the cotton mills and tar industry. In 1945 he was awarded an honorary MSc by the University of Manchester.

Savatard married twice. He had one son and two daughters by his second marriage.
