= David Harrison (RAF officer) =

Air Commodore David Harrison, BSc RAF, is a retired RAF Officer and former Commandant of the Air Cadet Organisation (ACO).

== Early life ==
Air Cdre Harrison was educated at John Port School just outside Derby and went on to complete a BSc (Hons) degree in geography at Liverpool University.

== Military career ==
He joined the RAF in 1977 having completed 3 years as a VR member of Liverpool University Air Squadron. Following flying training, he was posted to fly the Phantom FGR2, became a Qualified Weapons Instructor and flew over 2,000 hours on the aircraft. On promotion to squadron leader, he was a flight commander on 19 (F) Sqn in Germany before serving in the Falkland Islands as commanding officer of No. 1435 Flight. In 1990, he completed Staff College with the Royal Navy at Greenwich and was then posted as personal staff officer to the air officer commanding No 11 Group.

On promotion to wing commander, he completed two short staff tours in the DIS and back at 11 Group before converting to the Tornado F3 and taking command as OC Operations Wing at RAF Coningsby. During his time at Coningsby he also spent 2 seasons as a display pilot with the Battle of Britain Memorial Flight, flying the Spitfire and Hurricane accumulating over 100 hours on both types.

In April 1999, following promotion to group captain he was posted to the Training Group Defence Agency to lead "Project 08 – A Strategic Study into Future Flying Training". After completion of the Study he went on to develop the outline requirement for the procurement programme to deliver future flying training for the RAF – the UK Military Flying Training System. Group Captain Harrison then became group captain flying training within the Training Group Defence Agency, with oversight of the majority of the flying training system for Royal Navy, Army and RAF pilots and aircrew. During this period he also completed the Higher Command and Staff Course at JSCSC Shrivenham. He took up post as station commander at RAF Linton-on-Ouse in December 2002, having converted to the Tucano and completed training to become a Qualified Flying Instructor.

Before taking up his position as commandant air cadets, Air Cdre Harrison completed a 6-month OOA deployment based in Qatar as the UK air component commander for the RAF's air operations in Iraq, the Gulf area and Afghanistan.

== Commandant Air Cadets and post military career ==
Air Commodore Harrison was appointed Commandant Air Cadets in July 2005 and retired from the RAF in October 2006 to train civilian pilots for CTC Aviation Training in New Zealand, where he has taken up the position of Chief Flying Instructor on the multi engine fleet.

Preceded by Jon Chitty	Commandant Air Cadets; 2005–2006	Succeeded by Gordon Moulds
