= Joseph T. Gedge =

Royal Navy officer

Joseph Theodore Gedge
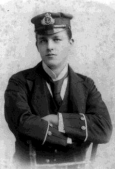
- Born: 27 March 1878; Swanley England
- Died: 6 August 1914 (aged 36); HMS Amphion, English Channel
- Military career
- Allegiance: United Kingdom
- Branch: Royal Navy
- Service years: 1896–1914
- Rank: Paymaster
- Conflicts: World War I: Naval campaign; English Channel campaign; Sinking of HMS Amphibon †

Paymaster Joseph Theodore Gedge (27 March 1878 – 6 August 1914) was the first British officer to die in World War I when HMS Amphion was sunk by a German mine. HMS Amphion was also the first British vessel to be sunk during World War I.

In 1929 the Royal Navy instituted the Gedge Medal, the first medal for professional merit that had been given to the Accountant Branch of the Royal Navy. He was further commemorated when his old school named a science block in his memory, raising a fund that was supported by Fleet Lord Jellicoe.

== Life ==
Joseph Theodore Gedge was born on 27 March 1878 in Swanley, the son of Rev. Edmund Gedge. He was educated at St John's School, Leatherhead, and joined the Royal Navy in 1896.

Gedge served on several ships during his career including, ironically, the fourth British vessel to be named Amphion as Assistant Paymaster. He served on HMS Brilliant when that vessel assisted the US Navy to protect foreign nationals during a revolution in Spanish Honduras. Gedge was moved to HMS Amphion (the fifth British naval vessel to be so named) which was to become the leading vessel of the 3rd Destroyer Flotilla, in defence of the Eastern end of the English Channel. In the early stages of the war, HMS Amphion sank the German mine layer, SS Königin Luise, picking up 20 German survivors. After the successful sinking of the SS Königin Luise, the Amphion set off to avoid the mines that had been laid, but nonetheless struck one of them on 6 August 1914; 148 men were lost, including 18 of the German POWs, and Paymaster Gedge.

HMS Amphion was the first British vessel to be sunk during World War I. Gedge was the first British officer to die in World War I.

In 1929 the Royal Navy instituted the Gedge Medal, the first medal for professional merit that had been given to the Accountant Branch of the Royal Navy. Gedge was further commemorated when his old school named a science block in his memory, raising a fund that was supported by Fleet Lord Jellicoe.
