= Dawn McCafferty =

Former RAF officer

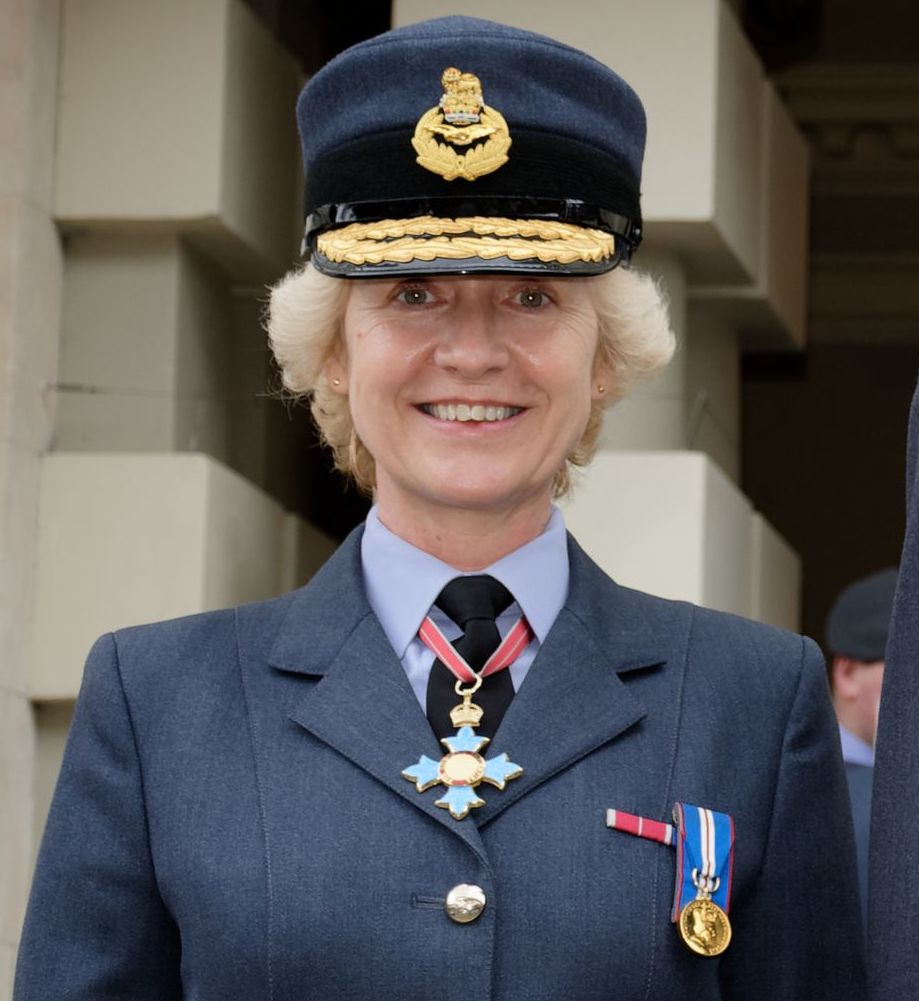
- McCafferty in 2018
- Born: 18 April 1964 (age 62); Rhondda, South Wales
- Allegiance: United Kingdom
- Branch: Royal Air Force
- Service years: 1988–2006 (RAF); 2012–2020 (RAF Reserve FTRS)
- Rank: Air Commodore
- Service number: 8032390B
- Commands: Royal Air Force Air Cadets
- Awards: Commander of the Order of the British Empire

Air Commodore Dawn Allison McCafferty CBE, is a former officer of both the RAF Reserve and the regular Royal Air Force. She was appointed as Commandant Air Cadets in August 2012, taking over from Barbara Cooper. She retired in July 2020 and was succeeded by Gp Capt John Lawlor as Acting Commandant.

== Career ==
McCafferty, who was born in the Rhondda South Wales, and later lived in Wigston Magna, joined the RAF at the age of 19 for a four-year short service commission as a secretarial officer. She retired as a group captain in 2006, having completed 23 years of Regular service.

McCafferty's career culminated in her appointment as Inspector of Recruiting for the RAF. She had previously commanded the personnel management squadron at RAF Wittering and the administrative wing at RAF Waddington. She completed staff tours in Command Headquarters and in the Ministry of Defence. After leaving the RAF in 2006, McCafferty set up and ran the Royal Air Force Families Federation from its inception in 2007 until 2012.

McCafferty was appointed Commandant Air Cadets in 2012, initially on a four-year appointment. In 2015, it was confirmed that she would continue in the post until 2020, where she retired in July.

McCafferty was appointed Commander of the Order of the British Empire (CBE) in the 2017 Birthday Honours.

== Personal life ==
McCafferty resides in Cornwall. She is also married to her husband and has two children by her former husband Paul.

Military offices
| Preceded by Barbara Cooper | Commandant Air Cadets; 2012–2020 | Incumbent |
