= Lancelot Driffield =

English cricketer

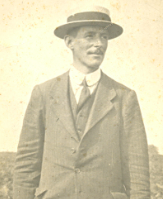
Lancelot Driffield

Lancelot Townshend Driffield (10 August 1880 – 9 October 1917) was an English cricketer who played in first-class cricket matches for Cambridge University and Northamptonshire between 1900 and 1908. He was born in Old, Northamptonshire and died in Leatherhead, Surrey. He appeared in 61 first-class matches as a left-handed batsman who bowled left-arm orthodox spin. He scored 851 runs with a highest score of 56 and took 137 wickets with a best performance of seven for 7.

Driffield was educated briefly at the Junior School for Monkton Combe School before going on to St John's School, Leatherhead and St Catharine's College, Cambridge. After leaving Cambridge he taught at St Edmund's School, Canterbury and at Derby School before returning to St John's School as a teacher in 1911, where he taught until his death at the school from heart failure in 1917.
