= Gordon Moulds =

Royal Air Force officer

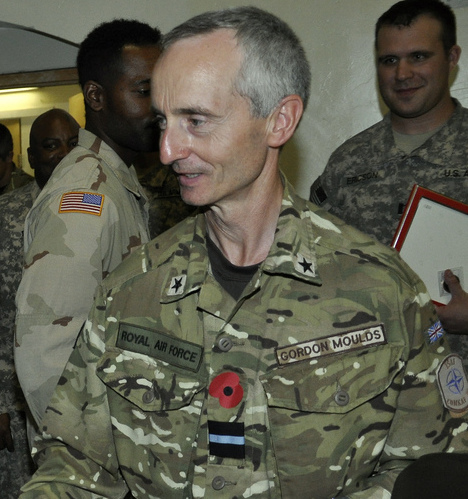
- Air Commodore Moulds in 2010
- Allegiance: United Kingdom
- Branch: Royal Air Force
- Service years: 1978–2010
- Rank: Air Commodore
- Commands: Kandahar Airfield (Designate); British Forces South Atlantic Islands; Air Cadet Organisation; Operations Wing – RAF Leuchars
- Awards: Commander of the Order of the British Empire

Air Commodore Gordon Moulds, CBE DL is a retired Senior Royal Air Force Officer who held various commands including most recently Commander of Kandahar Airfield in Afghanistan.

== Military career ==
Air Commodore Gordon Moulds joined the Royal Air Force in 1978 and trained as an Air Electronic Operator on Nimrod aircraft in the Maritime role. He served his first operational tour at RAF Kinloss as a sergeant where he participated in a number of operations, most notably flying from Ascension Island in support of the Falkland Islands’ campaign.

In 1983, he undertook navigator training and was posted to No. 111 Squadron RAF, RAF Leuchars, to operate the Air Defence F-4 Phantom II fighter aircraft. During this period he conducted numerous Quick Reaction Alert sorties (policing the United Kingdom airspace) where he and his pilot intercepted over 30 Russian aircraft.

In 1988 he became a Qualified Weapons Instructor in the air defence role and was posted to No 228 OCU, the Phantom Operational Conversion Unit; during this tour he was awarded the MBE.

On Monday 9 January 1989, Moulds was flying as Navigator in a Phantom FGR2, tail number XT908, with Sqn Ldr John Nelson as Pilot. The sortie was planned as an air combat exercise between two Phantom FGR2's of 228 OCU from RAF Leuchars. XT908 was a trainer variant but had the control column in the rear cockpit removed.

The first intercept went as planned but in the climb back to 10,000ft, Sqn Ldr Nelson suddenly informed Moulds that he was feeling unwell. Moulds then informed the rest of the formation of the emergency and provided the pilot with a steer towards base.

Shortly afterwards, the pilot's level of consciousness rapidly decreased and although he was responding to commands, they were slow. The aircraft then began a descent and despite repeated requests, the aircraft continued to lose altitude. Moulds shouted "Pull Up" and the pilot responded in an agitated manner and selected full dry power (no re-heat) and 10 degrees nose up. After this the pilot failed to respond to any requests.

Moulds selected full re-heat and as the aircraft passed 16,000ft, it departed from controlled flight and entered a spin. As there was no control column in the rear, Moulds ejected after being advised by the other aircraft not to leave his ejection too late. He informed the pilot of the plan however Nelson failed to eject and was killed in the ensuing crash. The aircraft impacted the North Sea at the location 56'30.00"North, 0' 20.00" West

Throughout his time on Phantom aircraft he completed 7 detachments to the Falkland Islands.

On promotion to Squadron Leader he became the aircraft accident Board of Inquiry advisor for Headquarters 11 Group at RAF Bentley Priory. In 1993, he converted on to the Tornado F3 fighter aircraft and became the Executive Officer of the Tornado F3 Operational Training Unit.

On promotion to Wing Commander, he became the Deputy Combined Force Air Component Commander in Turkey, policing the Iraqi no-fly zones. A short tour followed in the Ministry of Defence as the desk officer responsible for advising ministers on air matters relating to the Middle East. In 1998 he became Officer Commanding Operations Wing at RAF Leuchars.

Another short tour followed in the Ministry of Defence, this time as the Personal Staff Officer to the Assistant Chief of the Air Staff. On promotion to Group Captain, he was posted to Headquarters 1 Group, Strike Command, as Group Captain Tornado where he was responsible for all operational, training and second customer issues for the Tornado F3, Tornado GR4 and Hawk aircraft.

=== Commandant Air Cadets ===
In June 2004, he assumed the post of Chief of Staff/Air Commander in the Falkland Islands. During that tour, his only interest was promotion. Returning to the UK to take up the post of Commandant Air Cadets on promotion to Air Commodore on 13 October 2006, replacing Air Commodore David Harrison.

Whilst Commandant Air Cadets, he visited many units and Squadrons, and was extremely impressed with the efforts being made by the volunteer staff and the subsequent results for the cadets of those Squadrons, in particular those units that have been able to provide sustained levels of high achievement across the broad range of activities that the ACO provides.

Air Commodore Moulds instigated a number of wide-ranging initiatives in the Air Cadet Organisation and introduced a Strategic Plan for the next ten years. Amongst these initiatives were:- The development of Regional Activity Centres providing weekend activities with advanced technology flight simulators and equipment alongside air experience flying or gliding; The introduction of a "Cadet CV" to collate the records of activities of individual cadets and provide evidence to future employers; An updating of the syllabus to relate to 21st century teenagers and bringing in web based training packages; The continued roll out of Project BADER named after Group Captain Douglas Bader bringing a Corps wide IT system of communication, information and training.

Air Commodore Moulds handed over command of the ACO to Air Commodore Ian Stewart in May 2008.

=== Commander British Forces South Atlantic Islands ===
Air Commodore Moulds became Commander British Forces South Atlantic Islands on 14 June 2008. He was appointed Commander of the Order of the British Empire (CBE) in the 2009 Birthday Honours. He was replaced by Commodore Phillip Thicknesse in December 2009.

=== Commander Kandahar Airfield, Afghanistan ===
It was announced in March 2010 that Air Commodore Moulds was to become Commander Kandahar Airfield taking up the post in May 2010. He handed over command to Brigadier General Jeffrey Kendall of the United States Air Force in November 2010.

== Roles after military career ==
Upon retirement from the RAF, Moulds became the chief executive officer for the national children's charity KidsOut, leading them to support over 70,000 disadvantaged children a year. Moulds has also been a key note on cyber security for LogRhythm.

== Published works ==
- The Lightning Conversion Units 1960 – 1987

Military offices
| Preceded by David Harrison | Commandant Air Cadets; 2006–2008 | Succeeded by Ian Stewart |
| Preceded by Brigadier N R Davies | Commander British Forces South Atlantic Islands; 2008–2009 | Succeeded by Commodore Phillip Thicknesse |
| Preceded by M A B Brecht | Commander Kandahar Airfield; March 2010 – November 2010 | Succeeded by Brigadier General Jeffrey Kendall |
