= Ian Stewart (RAF officer) =

British Royal Air Force officer

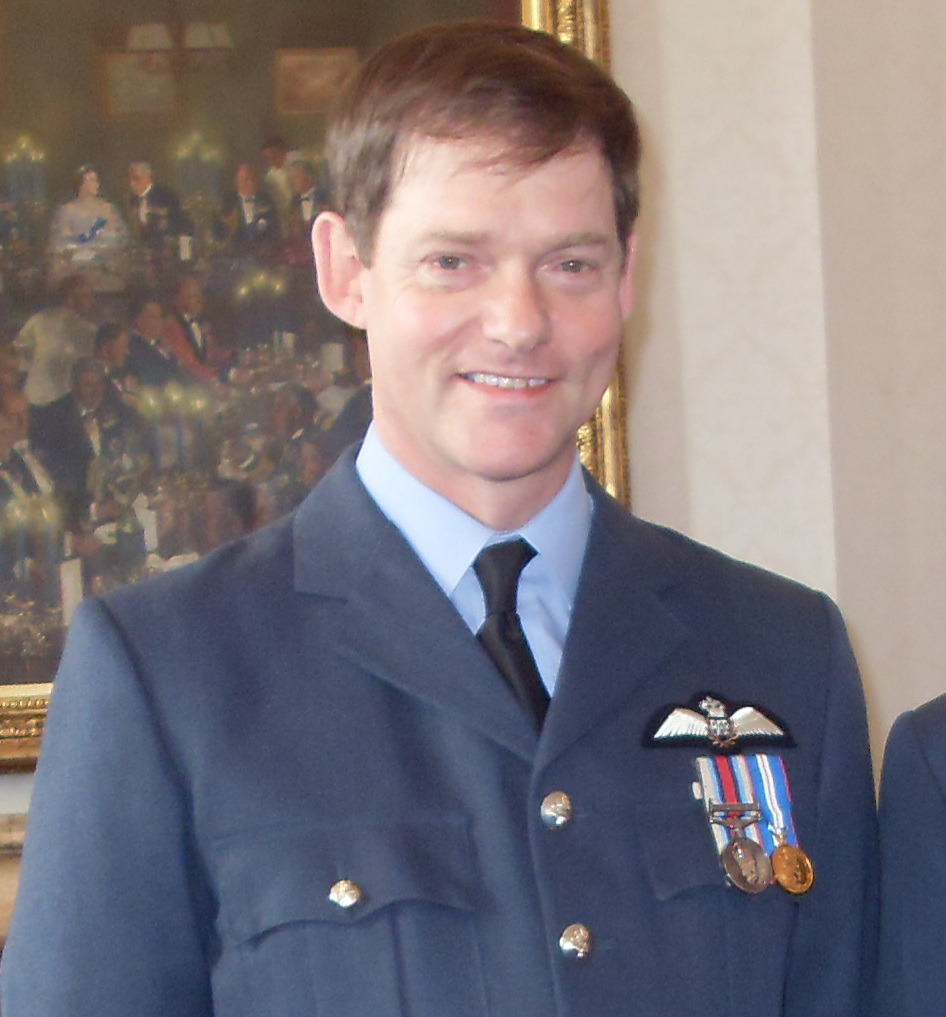
- Air Commodore Stewart in 2010
- Allegiance: United Kingdom
- Branch: Royal Air Force
- Service years: 1980 – 2013
- Rank: Air Commodore
- Commands: Flying Training Development Wing - RAF Halton; Officer Commanding 56 (R) Squadron - RAF Coningsby; Air Cadet Organisation

Air Commodore Ian Richard William Stewart CBE FRAeS is a retired British Royal Air Force officer. His last posting was as the United Kingdom National Military Representative at Supreme Headquarters Allied Powers Europe. He was Commandant Air Cadets between 2008 and 2010, and Air Commodore, Royal Air Force Reserve from 2014.

== Early life ==
Stewart was educated at St John's School, Leatherhead, where he became a Cadet Warrant Officer in the CCF (RAF) Section based there. He studied Aeronautical and Astronautical Engineering at Southampton University as an Acting Pilot Officer with an RAF University Cadetship.

== Military career ==
Having completed Officer Training at RAF Cranwell in 1980, he remained to complete basic flying training before moving on to RAF Valley for advanced training. He was selected to become an instructor and after completing Central Flying School training at RAF Leeming, he was posted to RAF Linton-on-Ouse in 1983 as a Qualified Flying Instructor where he flew over 1000 hours on the Jet Provost basic trainer.

In 1986 he converted to the Phantom FGR2 and served on 92 Squadron, RAF Wildenrath in Germany, as the Squadron Qualified Flying Instructor. He moved back to 228 Operational Conversion Unit at RAF Leuchars in 1989 before converting to fly the Tornado F3.

In 1992 he moved from Leuchars to RAF Coningsby and joined the Tornado F3 Operational Conversion Unit 56 (R) Squadron as a flight commander. In 1994 he joined the staff at 11 Group Headquarters at RAF Bentley Priory, serving on the Air Defence training desk.

At the end of 1996 he completed the Joint Service Defence College course at Greenwich. He then commanded the Flying Training Development Wing at RAF Halton where he was responsible for devising a training strategy for fast jet pilots.

In 1999 he served in the Defence Crisis Management Centre in MOD as a Kosovo briefing officer and completed a short tour within the former Directorate of Public Relations (RAF). From April 2000 to October 2002 he was the Officer Commanding 56 (R) Squadron at RAF Coningsby.

After achieving over 1000 flying hours on the Tornado F3 he joined the UK Permanent Joint Headquarters at Northwood as the J5 Plans SO1 Deployable Liaison Officer, and was a member of the Operation TELIC planning staff responsible for the UK's contribution to Coalition operations in Iraq.

In 2003 he was posted to Ramstein Air Base, Germany, where he served as the A3 Division Head and United Kingdom Senior National Representative within the NATO Component Command Air Headquarters. In early 2004 he served as Assistant Chief of Staff (Air) within the International Security Assistance Force in Kabul, Afghanistan.

Stewart is the Chairman of the 56 Squadron Association and the Chair of Trustees of the RAF Cranwell Kidzone Childcare Centre. He is also President of the civilian committee at 2185 (Wareham) Squadron and 2185 (Swanage) Detached Flight of the Air Training Corps, Royal Air Force Air Cadets

=== Senior appointments ===
He served as the head of the Officer and Aircrew Cadet Training Unit at RAF Cranwell from 2006 until May 2008. In May 2008, he became Commandant Air Cadets, replacing Air Commodore Gordon Moulds. After two years as Commandant, Stewart handed over the baton of command to Air Commodore Barbara Cooper in May 2010.

Stewart assumed his appointment at Supreme Headquarters Allied Powers Europe on 24 May 2010.

He retired from the Royal Air Force on 22 November 2013 and was appointed Air Commodore, Royal Air Force Reserve in September 2014.

== Personal life ==
He has been married to Rosemary since 1981 and they have three children: Chris, Mike and James. His interests include skiing, foreign travel and singing.

== Honours and decorations ==
Stewart was awarded the NATO Meritorious Service Medal in 2006 for services to NATO. He was appointed Commander of the Order of the British Empire (CBE) in the 2013 Birthday Honours.

He was elected a Fellow of the Royal Aeronautical Society (FRAeS) in 2009 and was appointed a Deputy Lieutenant for the East Riding of Yorkshire in 2016.

Military offices
Preceded by Air Commodore Gordon Moulds	Commandant Air Cadet Organisation; 2008 – 2010	Succeeded by Air Commodore Barbara Cooper
Preceded by D C Eccles	United Kingdom Military Representative; Supreme Headquarters Allied Powers Europe; 2010 – 2013	Succeeded by
