= Peter Rothwell =

Royal Air Force officer (1920–2010)

- Squadron Leader Peter Rothwell
- Born: 20 October 1920; Bristol, England
- Died: 20 December 2010 (aged 90); Hampshire, England
- Military career
- Allegiance: United Kingdom
- Service years: 1938–1945
- Rank: Squadron leader
- Unit: Special Duties
- Conflicts: Second World War: Battle of Britain

Squadron Leader Peter Rothwell (20 October 1920 – 20 December 2010) was an English bomber pilot in the Second World War and a key figure in the defence of Malta during World War II.

== Life ==
Rothwell was born in Bristol, the son of a vicar. He was the eldest of seven children and was educated at St John's School, Leatherhead. His education was cut short by the early death of his father, resulting in him taking a job with Imperial Tobacco.

He joined the RAF Volunteer Reserve in 1938 and joined 221 Squadron after pilot training. In early 1942 Rothwell transferred from Iceland to the Special Duties Wellington flight based on Malta. The Special Duties group flew with the Royal Navy to locate enemy convoys, and bring in ships or aircraft, dropping flares, observing results and also bombing themselves. He arrived during one of the coldest winters on record and was billeted in a former leper colony. In an interview Rothwell said "It was freezing. The boys were all drinking gin with hot water and eating tiny pickled onions to help them forget the cold."

After the billets were destroyed by enemy action the squadron was moved to the seaplane base at Lalafrana. From Malta, Rothwell and his colleagues attacked Axis convoys and airfields. After their accommodation at Lalafrana was again destroyed, they were forced to live in nearby caves, where they had to endure vicious sand bugs.

Later in the war, Rothwell was brought back to the UK where he undertook instructing and then moved to a Halifax flying meteorological squadron. When he was demobbed, Rothwell had flown 158 operational sorties.

His first wife Eileen died in 1959 and he also lost his eldest son; he raised his remaining five children and set up and ran a boat-building business in Hampshire. He married a second time to Margaret.

In retirement he was an active member of the George Cross Island Association and undertook annual pilgrimages to Malta each April.

== See also ==
- Award of the George Cross to Malta
