= Barbara Cooper (RAF officer) =

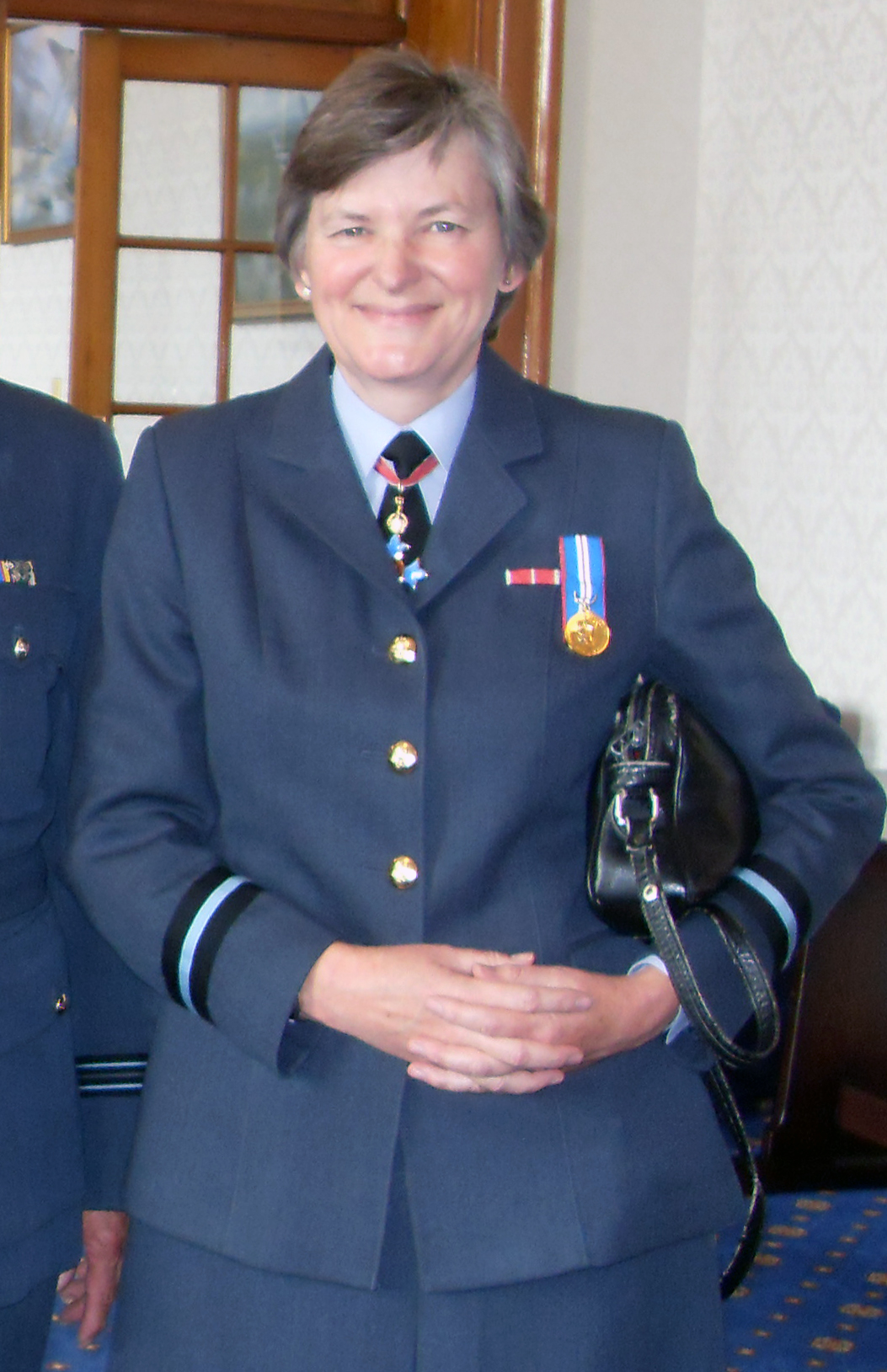
- Air Commodore Cooper in 2008
- Born: 1958 (age 67–68); Canada
- Military career
- Allegiance: United Kingdom
- Branch: Royal Air Force
- Service years: 1979–2012
- Rank: Air Commodore
- Service number: 8032068L
- Commands: Air Cadet Organisation
- Conflicts: Gulf War; Iraq War
- Awards: Commander of the Order of the British Empire

Air Commodore Barbara Cooper, CBE (born 23 November 1958) is a retired Royal Air Force (RAF) officer and former Commandant of the Air Cadet Organisation. She was promoted to air commodore in 2008 and became the RAF's highest-ranking female. She became the Assistant Chief of Staff (Manning) at Air Command headquarters. She previously served at the tri-service military Defence Academy in Shrivenham as Division Director.

== Early life ==
Cooper was born on 23 November 1958 in Kingston, Ontario, Canada. She moved with her family to Britain at the age of eleven. They lived in Worcestershire, where Cooper attended Evesham High School.

== Military career ==
On a short service commission in 1979, Cooper joined the Women's Royal Air Force (WRAF) in the role of air-traffic controller, at a time when far fewer women were in the service. She served for seven years. She was promoted from flying officer to flight lieutenant on 3 June 1984. She transferred to the reserves on 2 February 1985.

On leaving, Cooper went on to gain qualifications in property management. Finding she missed the service, she chose to return to the WRAF, entering the Administrative Branch as a flight lieutenant on 16 October 1987 with seniority from 16 April 1987.

From the 1980s, Cooper had a number of postings, including as staff officer to the Chief of the Air Staff (the most senior position in the RAF). During the Gulf War, she had responsibility for running the Prisoner of War Information Bureau, acting as liaison to the International Committee of the Red Cross. Cooper was promoted to squadron leader on 5 January 1993, and to wing commander on 1 July 1997.

Cooper served a two-year tenure at RAF Lyneham (to March 2000), in which she was in charge of base support and where her staff provided operational support for troop movements to Sierra Leone. Thereafter she was stationed at Joint Services Command and Staff College (JSCSC) at Shrivenham, which relocated there in the same year. Cooper was appointed an Officer of the Order of the British Empire in the 2001 New Year Honours.

During the Iraq War, Cooper served as Deputy Director Service Personnel Policy (Operations and Manning), which includes operational welfare policy, and included reporting before the government Select Committee on Defence. She was promoted to Commander of the Order of the British Empire on 31 October 2003 "in recognition of gallant and distinguished services in connection with operations in Iraq during the period 19th March to 19th April 2003".

In 2005, Cooper assumed the role of Director Royal Air Force Division at the Defence Academy, which formed in April 2002 as a consolidation of the constituent colleges such as the JSCSC, and Royal College of Defence Studies.

From 2007 Cooper was appointed Assistant Chief of Staff Manpower and Personnel Capability at RAF Air Command HQ. At the beginning of the following year, Cooper was promoted from group captain to the rank of air commodore, becoming the most senior female officer in the British armed forces.

From May 2010 Cooper became the senior officer responsible for running the Air Cadet Organisation. Her first public appearance in her new Commandant role followed one week later at the Cadet150 reception commemorating 150 years of the Cadet Forces of the tri-Service military. The following month she attended the second of the two sesquicentenary events, a Garden Party at Buckingham Palace, where she spoke to Air Training Corps members from all over the UK.

== Personal life ==
Cooper lives in Cirencester with her husband William, a retired RAF officer. Among those she admires she considers suffragette Emmeline Pankhurst her greatest inspiration. Her interests include gardening, cycling and watching horseriding events. She lists her favourite author as Shakespeare, she enjoys gardening, walking, cycling and the theatre and is president of the RAF Theatrical Association and the RAF Netball Association. In 2012 she was elected to the Council of the National Trust.

Military offices
| Preceded by Ian Stewart | Commandant Air Cadet Organisation; 2010–2012 | Succeeded by Dawn McCafferty |
