= Ashby Haslewood =

English clergyman, educationalist, and cricketer

Ashby Blair Haslewood (16 July 1811 – 17 July 1876) was an English clergyman and educationalist who as a young man played first-class cricket for Cambridge University.

== Early life ==
Haslewood was born in 1811 in Wimbledon, then part of Surrey, the son of John Daniel Haslewood, a Church of England clergyman. He was christened at Hampstead on 7 October 1814, with the parish register noting his date of birth as 16 July 1811.

Haslewood matriculated at Christ's College, Cambridge, in the Michaelmas term of 1830, and the same term became a Tancred student. In 1831 he was elected to a scholarship and graduated BA in 1834.

== Career ==
Haslewood was ordained as a deacon of the Church of England in October 1834 and as a priest in February 1836. He was a curate at Boughton Monchelsea in Kent (where his father was vicar from 1823 to 1857), and then at Greenwich. From 1845 to 1864 he was priest in charge of St Mark's Church, Marylebone, and while there founded a choir school which in 1872 moved to Leatherhead in Surrey to become St John's School, Leatherhead. One of the school houses is named after him. He was later vicar of St Michael's, Coventry, and Holy Trinity, Maidstone, and of Mavesyn Ridware, Staffordshire.

Haslewood's appointment to St Mark's Church in Hamilton Terrace, Maida Vale, was controversial: he donated £3,500 towards the founding of the church and was then appointed as the priest in charge. Correspondence in The Times suggested that there might be an implication of simony in the arrangement.

== Cricketing career ==
Haslewood played in three matches for Cambridge University Cricket Club that have later been judged to be first-class games: one in each of the 1833, 1834 and 1835 seasons. He batted in the lower order and in the 1835 match he bowled, as he is recorded as taking wickets in that game; scorecards for his other matches are incomplete, so it is not possible to determine his exact role, nor whether he batted or bowled right- or left-handed.

Haslewood's death was registered at Marylebone in July 1876, when his age was stated as 65.
