= Basil Frederick Hood =

Paymaster-Captain Basil Frederick Hood CBE DSO (20 September 1886 – 10 January 1941) was a senior officer in the Royal Navy.

== Life ==
Basil Frederick Hood was born on 20 September 1886, the son of Rev. J.F. Hood BA and Mrs C. du plat Hood (née Richardson Griffiths). He was educated at St John's School, Leatherhead.

Hood joined the Royal Navy in 1904 and was appointed Assistant Paymaster in 1907, Paymaster in 1911 and Secretary to the Admiral of Patrols between 1912 and 1914. During World War II he was Secretary to the Vice-Admiral commanding the East Mediterranean during the Gallipoli Campaign between 1915 and 1916 where he was mentioned in despatches twice and made a Companion of the Distinguished Service Order. He was promoted to Paymaster Lieutenant-Commander in 1917, Paymaster-Commander in 1923 and Paymaster-Captain in 1934.

Hood was made CBE in 1937.
