= Peter Symes =

Australian researcher into paper money (born 1957)

Peter J. Symes (born 1957) is an Australian researcher into paper money. He is the author of many articles published in the International Bank Note Society Journal and of several books.

From mid 2004 to mid 2006 and from mid 2008 to mid 2012 he was the president of the International Bank Note Society. (IBNS). From mid 2006 to mid 2008 and from mid 2012 to mid 2016 he was the immediate past president of the IBNS, which role mainly involves advising the current president.

== Books ==
- 1998: The Bank Notes of Katanga. 85 pp.; illus. (b & w) Canberra: published by the author
- 1997: The Bank Notes of Yemen. 180 pp.; illus. (b & w) Canberra: published by the authors (with Murray Hanewich & Keith Street).
- 1999: Kirkwood & Sons, Copper-plate Engravers. 110 p.; illus. (b & w) Edinburgh: Merchiston Publishing
