= James Coward (composer) =

English organist and composer

James Coward (1824–1880) was an English organist and composer. Born in London on 25 January 1824, James and his brother William (1826–1878) were choristers in the Westminster Abbey. During the years 1857-80 James was organist in the Crystal Palace. From 1868-80 he was also organist to the St Magnus-the-Martyr church. He was renowned for his powers of improvisation on this instrument. Among his compositions are a full anthem "O Lord, correct me"; Ten glees for 4 and 5 voices (London, 1857); Ten glees (London, 1871); numerous songs, dart-songs etc.

His daughter Hilda Coward was a soprano vocalist who made her debut at a concert given by W. Lemare, at the Crystal Palace on 6 March 1882. She presented there many times thereafter. His son James Munro Coward was also an organist and composer. Among his compositions is a cantata "The Fishers" (1889), and a Jubilee Hymn, for chorus and military band (1897); he also composed a large number of pieces for the American and Mustel organs.

Coward died in London on 22 January 1880.
