= Falklands War order of battle: British air forces =

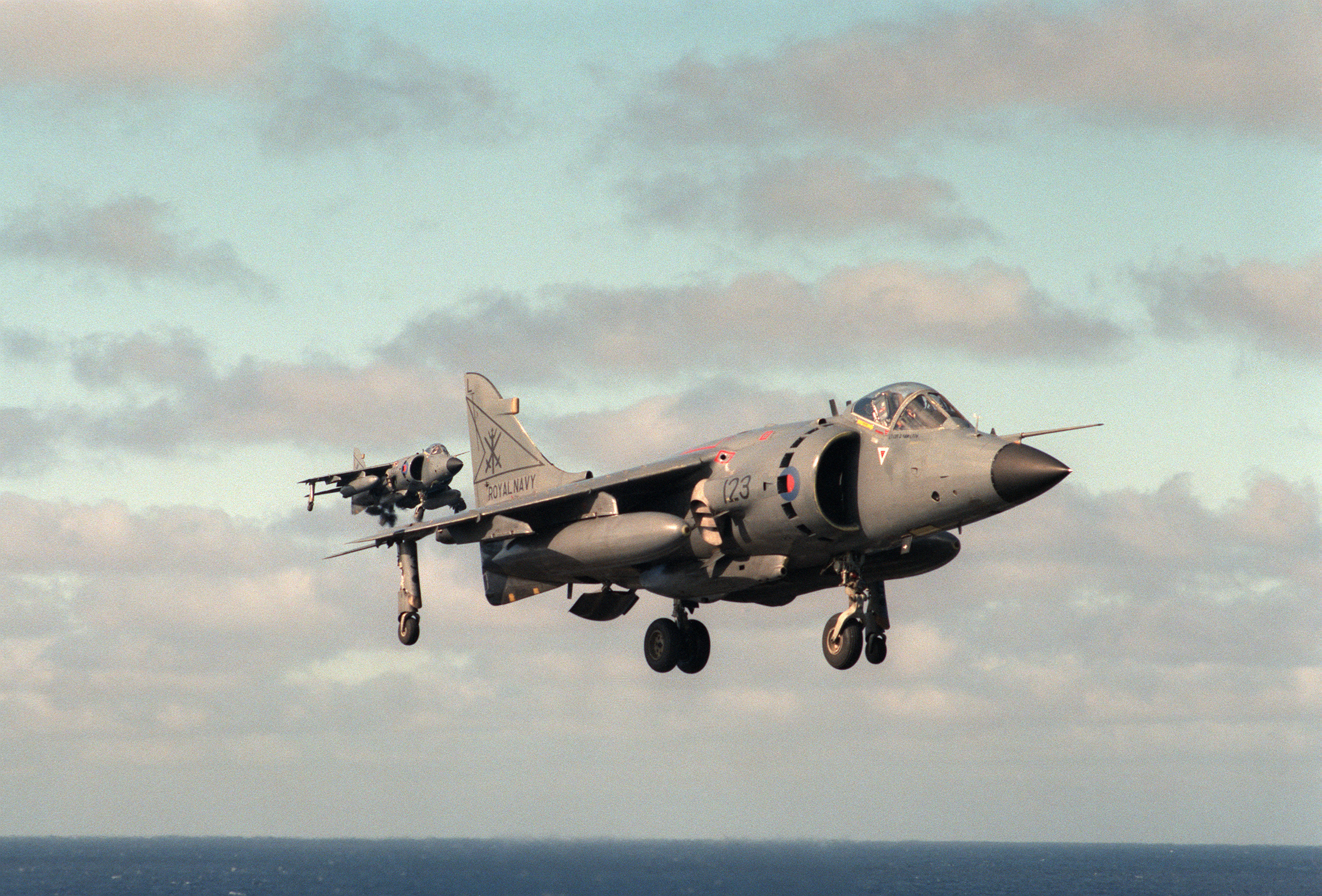
800 NAS Sea Harrier FRS1 in low-visibility paint scheme.

This is a list of the units, aircraft and casualties of the British air services in the Falklands War. The numbers in bold are the number of aircraft used in the war, the numbers in brackets are the number of lost aircraft. For a list of air forces from Argentina, see Falklands War order of battle: Argentine air forces.

== Units ==
=== Army Air Corps ===
- No. 656 Squadron Army Air Corps – (Gazelle AH.1, Scout AH.1) **6 (1), 6**

=== Royal Marines ===
- 3 CDO Brigade Air Squadron – (Gazelle AH.1, Scout AH.1) **9 (2), 6 (1)**

=== Fleet Air Arm ===
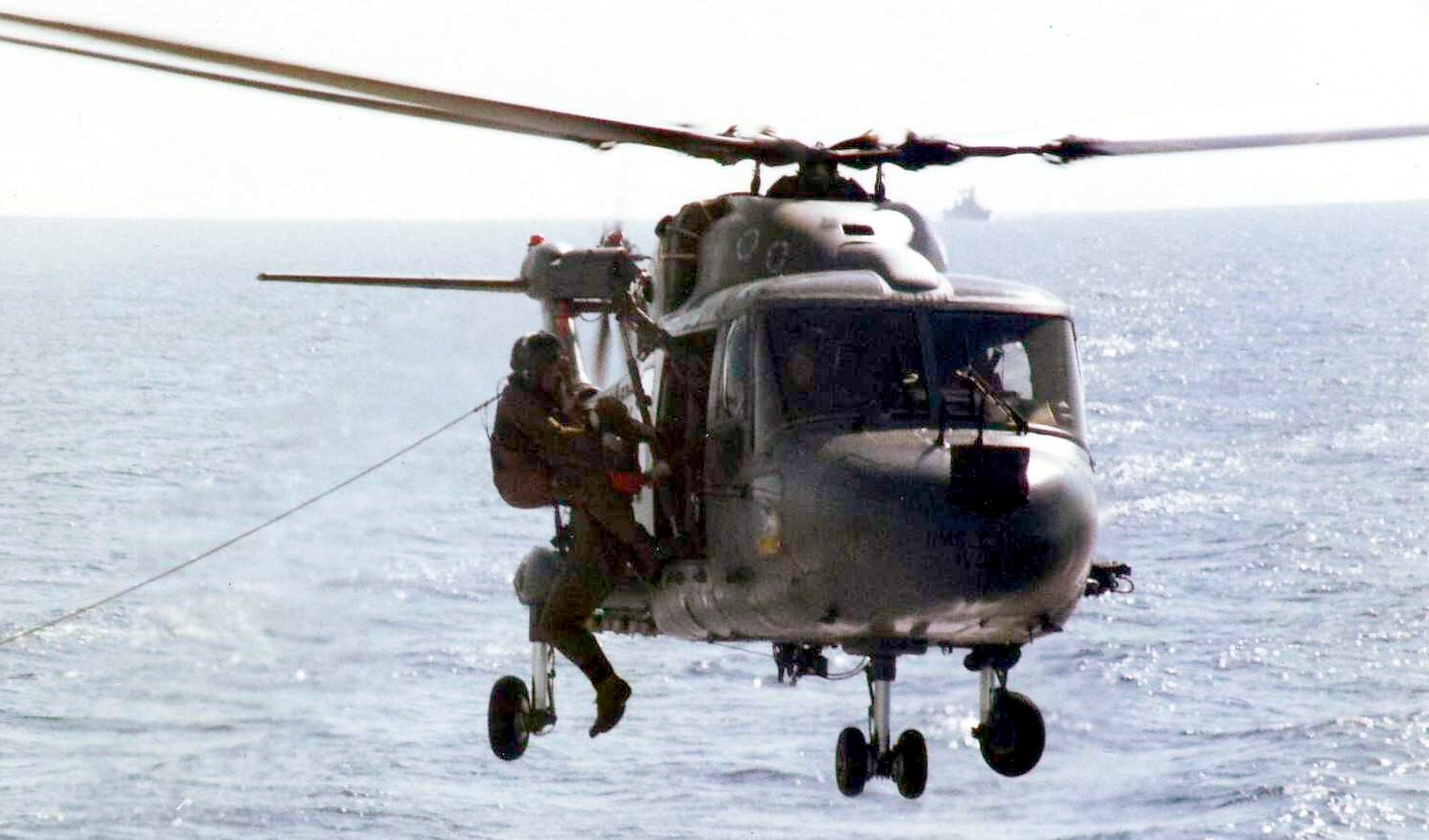
HMS Cardiff's Lynx helicopter 1982.

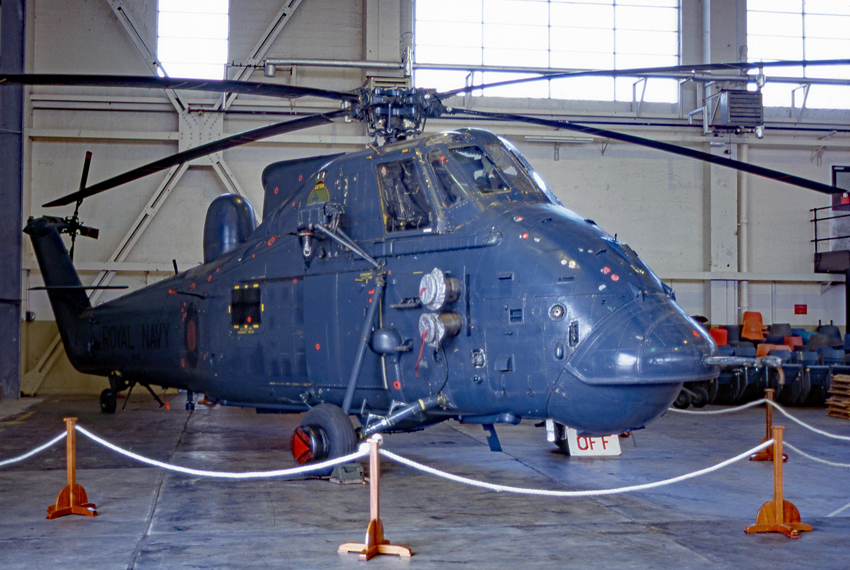
XP142 Humphrey, Wessex from HMS Antrim

Squadron	Aircraft	Number	Lost	Notes
737 NAS	Wessex HAS.3	2	1	HMS Antrim & HMS Glamorgan
800 NAS	Sea Harrier FRS.1	12	2	HMS Hermes. RAF personnel attached.
801 NAS	Sea Harrier FRS.1	12	4	HMS Invincible. RAF personnel attached.
809 NAS	Sea Harrier FRS.1	12		HMS Hermes & Invincible
815 NAS	Lynx HAS.2 Lynx HAS.3	7 7	3	Type 42 destroyers, Type 21 and Type 22 frigates
820 NAS	Sea King HAS.5	9		HMS Invincible
824 NAS	Sea King HAS.2 Sea King HAS.2A	3 2		RFA Fort Rosalie & Olmeda
825 NAS	Sea King HAS.2	10		SS Atlantic Causeway & Queen Elizabeth 2
826 NAS	Sea King HAS.5	12	2	HMS Hermes
829 NAS	Wasp HAS.1	9		(HMS Endurance, HMS Bristol, Leander-class & Type 12 frigates)
845 NAS	Wessex HU.5	15	2	RFA Tidespring, Tidepool, Fort Austin & Port San Carlos
846 NAS	Sea King HC.4	15	3	HMS Hermes, Fearless class, SS Canberra, Elk & Norland
847 NAS	Wessex HU.5	24		SS Atlantic Causeway, RFA Engadine & Port San Carlos
848 NAS	Wessex HU.5	15	6	(HMS Endurance, RFA Olna, SS Atlantic Conveyor & Astronomer)

=== Royal Air Force ===
All of the four-engined aircraft operated from Wideawake Airfield, Ascension Island, but flew in the war zone.

- No. 1(F) Squadron – (Harrier GR.3) **10 (4)** (HMS Hermes & Port San Carlos)
- No. 18 Squadron – (Chinook HC.1) **4 (3)** +1 at Wideawake
- No. 29 Squadron – (Phantom FGR.2) **3**; only at Wideawake
- No. 39 Squadron – (Canberra PR.9) **2**; Clandestine operations from Chile
- No. 42 Squadron – (Nimrod MR.2) **3**
- No. 44 Squadron – (Vulcan B.2) **2**
- No. 47 Squadron – (Hercules C.1) **3**
- No. 50 Squadron – (Vulcan B.2) **1**
- No. 51 Squadron – (Nimrod R.1) **3**
- No. 55 Squadron – (Victor K.2) **10**
- No. 57 Squadron – (Victor K.2) **10**
- No. 70 Squadron – (Hercules C.1) **3**
- No. 101 Squadron – (Vulcan B.2) **1**
- No. 120 Squadron – (Nimrod MR.2) **3**
- No. 201 Squadron – (Nimrod MR.2) **3**
- No. 202 Squadron – (Sea King HAR.3) **1** only at Wideawake
- No. 206 Squadron – (Nimrod MR.2) **4**
- No. 10 Squadron - (VC10 C.1) **14**

=== Armament ===
- L44A1 GPMG (General Purpose Machine Gun)
- 30 mm ADEN Cannon with 120–130 rounds Sea Harrier, Harrier GR.3
- AIM-9D/G Sidewinder Air-to-air missile (AAM) F-4 at Wideawake
- AIM-9L Sidewinder AAM Sea Harrier, Harrier GR.3
- AGM-45 Shrike Air-to-Surface Anti-radiation missile (ARM) Vulcan
- BAe Sea Skua Air-to-Surface anti-ship missile Lynx
- Aerospatiale AS.12 Air-to-Surface missile Wasp
- Paveway II Laser-guided bomb (LGB), 454 kg Harrier GR.3
- BL755 Cluster bomb with 147 bomblets Sea Harrier & Nimrod
- 1,000 lb General-Purpose Bomb Sea Harrier, Harrier GR.3, Vulcan & Nimrod
- SNEB Rockets Harrier GR.3, Gazelle
- Marconi Stingray Torpedo
- Mk. 46 Torpedo
- Mk. 11 Depth charge

== Air campaign ==
Sea Harrier FRS.1	1,435 sorties, 20 (+3) kills, 6 lost.
Harrier GR.3	126 sorties, 4 lost.
Vulcan B.2	5 sorties: 1, 3 May and 12 June; 21x1,000 lbs bombs – 31 May and 3 June; 4 x AGM-45 Shrike.
Victor K.2	375 sorties; 14 sorties per Vulcan raid, 12 sorties per extended Nimrod patrol, 6 sorties per Hercules long-range drop, 6 sorties per Harrier GR.3 staging (4), 3 radar reconnaissance sorties to South Georgia.
Nimrod MR.2	111 sorties: maritime patrols, coordinate air refueling, SAR links.
Hercules C.1	50+ airdrop sorties at Falklands Island, 600+ airbridge sorties UK-Ascension Island

== Casualties and aircraft losses ==
- Human losses:
  - 2 Army Air Corps
  - 4 3 Commando Brigade Air Squadron Royal Marines
  - 17 Fleet Air Arm
- **Passengers**
  - 1 Royal Air Force
  - 18 Special Air Service (Army)
  - 3 Royal Corps of Signals (Army)
- Aircraft Lost in the Air:, _{no suffix: Fleet Air Arm}
  - 2 Sea Harrier FRS.1 (hit by anti-aircraft fire during 4 May attack on Goose Green and by Roland missile during 1 June attack on Port Stanley)
  - 3 Westland Gazelle AH.1 Army and Royal Marines
  - 3 Harrier GR.3 RAF (shot down by shoulder-fired missile in Port Howard on 21 May, hit by anti-aircraft fire on 27 May over Goose Green and hit by ground fire near Port Stanley on 30 May)
  - 1 Scout AH.1 Royal Marines (shot down by Pucara at Goose Green on 28 May)
- **Flying accidents in the war zone**
  - 2 Westland Wessex HU.5 (crashed in bad weather on Fortune Glacier 22 April)
  - 2 Westland Sea King HC.4 (1 lost operational accident 23 April)
  - 4 Sea Harrier FRS.1 (two 801 Sqn CAP collided over the task force on 6 May – one 800 Sqn crashed during takeoff from Hermes on 24 May – one 801 Sqn slid off deck in bad weather on 29 May)
  - 2 Westland Sea King HAS.5 (ditched on 12 May & 17 May)
  - 1 Harrier GR.3 RAF (landing accident on 8 June)
  - 1 Scout AH.1 Royal Marines (crash landed after main rotor gearbox failure over MacPhee Pond, 8 June. Recovered but written off.)
- **Lost on board a ship**
  - 3 Westland Lynx HAS.2 (aboard Ardent on 21 May and aboard Coventry and Atlantic Conveyor on 25 May)
  - 3 Chinook HC.1 RAF
  - 6 Westland Wessex HU.5
  - 1 Westland Wessex HAS.3 (when Glamorgan hit by shore-launched Exocet on 12 June)
- **Self-destruct in Chile**
  - 1 Westland Sea King HC.4 (on 20 May)
- **Total**

10 fixed-wing aircraft and 25 helicopters.

== See also ==
- Falklands War order of battle: British ground forces
- Falklands War order of battle: British naval forces
