= James Coward (RAF officer) =

- Born: 18 May 1915
- Died: 25 July 2012 (aged 97)
- Military career
- Allegiance: United Kingdom
- Branch: Royal Air Force
- Service years: 1937–1969
- Rank: Air Commodore
- Service number: 39412
- Unit: No. 19 Squadron
- Commands: Air Training Corps; Air Cadets
- Conflicts: Second World War: Battle of Britain
- Awards: Air Force Cross

Air Commodore James Baird Coward, AFC (18 May 1915 – 25 July 2012) was a senior officer in the Royal Air Force. He was Air Officer Commanding Air Cadets and Commandant of the Air Training Corps between 1962 and 1966.

== Early life ==
Coward was born on 18 May 1915 in Teddington, Middlesex, England. He was educated at the private St John's School, Leatherhead, Surrey.

== RAF career ==
Coward was commissioned into the Royal Air Force as an acting pilot officer (on probation) on 28 January 1937. He joined No. 19 Squadron based at RAF Duxford as a pilot flying the Gloster Gauntlet, a single seat biplane. His commission was confirmed and he was regraded as a pilot officer on 16 November 1937. Having shown his artistic skill through caricatures of his comrades, he was tasked with painting the squadron badge on the canvas of the biplanes. However, after weeks of work, the Munich Crisis occurred and the biplanes, and their recently painted badges, were painted over in camouflage. His squadron was the first to be equipped with the Supermarine Spitfire, which entered service on 4 August 1938. He was promoted to flying officer on 16 June 1939.

With the outbreak of the Second World War, Coward was to serve as a pilot and staff officer. His squadron provided air support during the evacuation of the British Expeditionary Force from Dunkirk, between 27 May and 4 June 1940. On 2 June, he was credited with the probable destruction of a German Messerschmitt Bf 109 fighter aircraft. During the Battle of Britain, on 31 August 1940, his squadron was scrambled from RAF Fowlmere to intercept a group of German Dornier Do 215s. He led the second section in attacking the bombers. The weapons of his Spitfire jammed and, having come under fire, the controls were damaged sending the aircraft into a dive. His left foot was almost severed from his leg. Upon bailing out, he could not stand the pain of the swift fall and deployed his parachute. During the now-slower descent he used the radio lead attached to his helmet to tie a tourniquet around his thigh and stem the bleeding. Upon landing in a field, he met a youth who quickly found a doctor. Within half an hour, he was taken to Addenbrooke's Hospital in Cambridge to have his left leg amputated. He was promoted to flight lieutenant on 3 September 1940.

Having taken five months to recover from the surgery, Coward joined the personal staff of Prime Minister Winston Churchill. His main duty at Chequers, the prime minister's country residence, was to judge if reports were urgent enough to warrant waking Churchill during the night. At Chartwell, Churchill's private home, he coordinated the air surveillance to warn the prime minister of any impending attack from nearby Nazi occupied France. He was promoted to squadron leader (temporary) on 1 December 1941. Shortly after, he left Churchill's staff to become an instructor at the fighter training unit, based in RAF Aston Down. He went on to command the Aircraft Delivery Unit, part of Transport Command, at RAF Croydon. In 1944, he transferred to the Air Ministry where he was in charge of operational fighter training. On 5 March 1946, he was made a war substantive squadron leader.

After the war, Coward was posted as an Air Attaché to Norway in 1946. He was promoted to flight lieutenant on 1 May 1947 with seniority from 1 December 1942, and to squadron leader on 1 November 1947 with seniority from 1 August that year. He was given a permanent commission on 15 July 1948. He was promoted to wing commander on 1 July 1952, to group captain on 1 July 1958, and to air commodore on 1 July 1962. Between September 1962 and June 1966, he was Air Officer Commanding Air Cadets and Commandant of the Air Training Corps.

Coward retired from the Royal Air Force on 8 September 1969.

== Later life ==
Upon retirement, Coward and his wife moved to Canberra, Australia. There, he built one of the territory's first passively heated homes and converted a half-acre paddock into an organic garden. He died on 25 July 2012 in Yass, New South Wales. His wife survived him. He is buried in Michelago, New South Wales, alongside the two daughters who predeceased him.

== Honours and decorations ==
Coward received the 1939–45 Star with the Battle of Britain clasp. He was awarded the Air Force Cross (AFC) in the 1954 New Year Honours.

== Personal life ==
Coward married Cynthia Bayon on 29 December 1939. Together they had four daughters, two of whom predeceased him.
