= Peter Cresswell (judge) =

English judge (1944–2025)

Sir Peter John Cresswell, DL (24 April 1944 – 10 September 2025) was an English High Court judge, and a judge of the Qatar International Court and Dispute Resolution Centre.

== Life and career ==
Cresswell was born on 24 April 1944. He was educated at St John's School, Leatherhead, before studying law at Queens' College, Cambridge from 1962 to 1965, gaining an MA and LLB. He was then called to the bar at Gray's Inn in 1966. Cresswell was appointed Queen's Counsel in 1983 before being appointed a High Court judge in 1991 where he was assigned to the Queen's Bench Division. From 1993 to 1994 he was the judge in charge of the commercial court. Between 1993 and 1996 Creswell presided over the Lloyds litigation, the largest piece of civil litigation in the UK.

Cresswell retired from the High Court in 2008 and from 2009 to 2014 was a judge of the Grand Court of the Cayman Islands.

In November 2014 he was made a Companion of The Academy of Experts.

He was a Deputy Lieutenant of Hampshire and a Bencher of Gray's Inn.

Cresswell died from cancer on 10 September 2025, at the age of 81.
