= John Collinson (cricketer) =

English cricketer

Cricket information
- Batting: Right-handed

Career statistics
Competition	First-class
Matches	3
Runs scored	109
Batting average	18.16
100s/50s	0/0
Top score	34
Catches/stumpings	1/–
- Source: Cricinfo, 14 April 2023

John Collinson (2 October 1911 – 29 August 1979) was an English cricketer who played three first-class matches either side of the Second World War.

== Life ==
Collinson was educated at St John's School, Leatherhead. He appeared twice for Middlesex in August 1939, making his debut against Gloucestershire at Cheltenham. In this game he made 34 (which remained his career best) and 13, and took his only catch to dismiss Gloucestershire captain Beverley Lyon. He also played against Middlesex at Lord's a few days later, opening the batting and making 19 in each innings.

After the war, Collinson made one further first-class appearance, playing for Worcestershire against Combined Services at Worcester in 1946, having become a master at Malvern College since his earlier appearances for Middlesex. In his obituary, Wisden noted that 'he had a solid defence, but was a very slow scorer'.
