= Wymond Cory Symes =

British Businessman

Wymond Cory Symes (19 July 1867 – 1 July 1961) was a businessman, sportsman and member of the Bombay Legislative Council. He served as a Trustee of the Port of Bombay, Deputy Chairman of the Bombay Chamber of Commerce, a member of the Bombay Legislative Council and a Justice of the Peace in Bombay before his appointment as Managing Director of P&O's London office until his retirement in 1927.

== Life ==
Wymond Cory Symes was born on 19 July 1867, the son of the Rev. Thomas Legge Symes who was rector of St Keyne, Cornwall. He was educated at St John's School, Leatherhead where he was Captain of Football and the Cricket XI. After school he played rugby for Kent and Blackheath.

In 1885, Symes took up employment with the Peninsular & Oriental Steam Navigation Company in London. In 1890 he moved to P&O's office in Bombay. Outside of work, Symes started the Bombay Football Club before moving to P&O's Singapore office in 1898.

During his time in Singapore, Symes helped establish the Singapore Polo Club alongside officers of the King's Own Regiment who had recently arrived in Singapore from Hong Kong. He returned to Bombay in 1902 and later took over the agency. The importance of his role was recognised by his subsequent appointments as Trustee of the Port of Bombay, Deputy Chairman of the Chamber of Commerce, a member of the Bombay Legislative Council and a Justice of the Peace.

Symes's enjoyment of riding continued and he was made Steward of the West Indian Turf Club. In 1911 he was requested to join P&O's executive in London and returned to England. Symes was made Chairman of the Straits of China Shipping Conference and was Managing Director of P&O's London office until his retirement in 1927.

Symes married Evelyn Wise, youngest daughter of Lt-Col. Dacres Wise, of Loddiswell, Devon. Symes died on 1 July 1961 at his home near Taunton. His wife, a daughter and two sons survived him.
