= George Symes =

George Symes may refer to:

- George G. Symes (1840–1893), U.S. Representative from Colorado
- George Stewart Symes (1882–1962), Governor-General of the Anglo-Egyptian Sudan
- George William Symes (1896–1980), British Army officer
