= Leyland 4-tonne truck =

British military truck

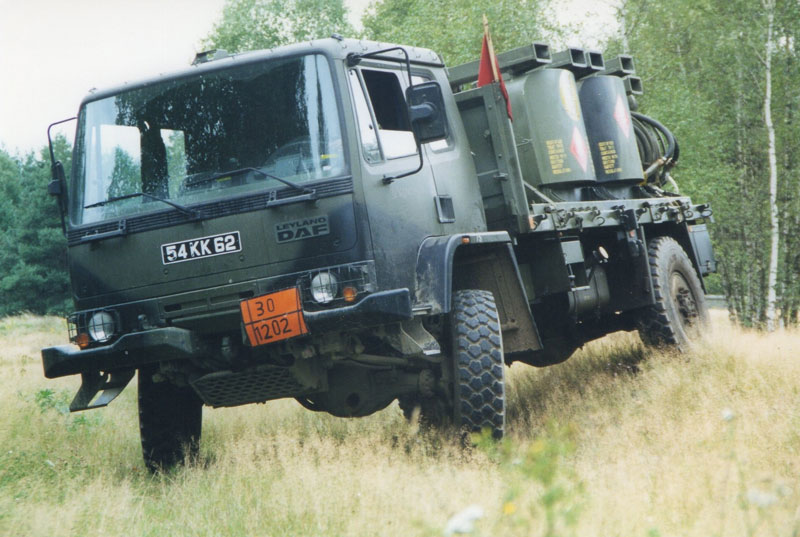
- British Army Leyland 4-tonne truck UBRE (Unit Bulk Refuelling Equipment) variant in Poland during Exercise Ulan Eagle
- Place of origin: United Kingdom

Service history
- Used by: United Kingdom, Ireland, Brunei, Indonesia, Kenya, Malaysia, United Nations and Uzbekistan.

Production history
- Designer: Leyland Trucks
- Manufacturer: Leyland Trucks
- Produced: Prototypes in 1987, production examples from 1990; main production (British Army contract) concluded in 1995.
- No. built: 4,500 (approx.)

Specifications
- Mass: 6010 kg (6720 kg with winch)
- Length: 6.65 m (261.8 in)
- Width: 2.49 m
- Height: 2.7 m (roof)
- Diameter: 2.49 m (98.0 in)
- Crew: driver
- Passengers: 2

The Leyland 4-tonne truck was produced by Leyland Trucks in Lancashire. It was developed for the British Army and won the competition to replace a fleet of older Bedford M-type 4-tonne trucks. It shares some key components with the commercial 45 Series light truck. Deliveries to the British Army started in 1990. The official British Army Out of Service Date for this truck was the end of 2014, but around 650 were retained. Small numbers were exported.

== Development ==
In December 1987, eight prototypes were handed over to the UK MoD to take part in a series of technical trials. Other competitors were Volvo (GB) Limited and Bedford.

In June 1989, Leyland Trucks was awarded a contract worth £155 million for the delivery of 5,350 vehicles over a five-year period. The first six production vehicles were handed over for acceptance in July 1990, with deliveries to the MoD commencing in August 1990.

Production was based at the Leyland Trucks Assembly Plant in Lancashire, using largely British-sourced components. Contracted deliveries were completed in April 1995 after 4,200 vehicles had been delivered. Follow-on orders to the UK MoD and others followed, bringing production totals to approximately 4,500 vehicles.

These trucks are normally referred to as Leyland but occasionally DAF or Leyland DAF, with most vehicles being badged Leyland DAF. Truck maker Leyland was sold by the UK government to DAF Trucks of the Netherlands in 1987, UK product subsequently being marketed as Leyland DAF. In 1993 DAF collapsed, the subsequent rescue package not including the UK part of the operation, which following a management buy-out, returned to UK ownership. The then Leyland Trucks was sold to Paccar of the US in 1998, two years after Paccar had acquired DAF.

The Leyland 4-tonne truck was one of a number of types to be replaced by the UK Defence Procurement Agency's Support Vehicle programme, for which a contract valued at £1.1 billion (now quoted as GBP1.3 billion) was awarded to MAN ERF UK Ltd in March 2005. Under the Support Vehicle contract Rheinmetall MAN Military Vehicles (RMMV) will deliver a mixed fleet consisting of MAN HX and SX ranges of tactical trucks. The most direct replacement for the Leyland 4-tonne truck is the HX60 6-tonne truck.

A proposed Invitation To Tender (ITT) for the refurbishment of the Leyland 4-/5-tonne truck fleet was shelved in favour of a Support Vehicle contract option.

The Leyland DAF 4-tonne truck was scheduled for an official British Army Out of Service Date of the end of 2014, however around 650 trucks have been retained to replace the Reynolds Boughton RB44 in mortar and 105 mm gun tractor role.

== Description ==
The Leyland 4-tonne truck is conventional in layout and design, is based on a standard C-section chassis and some key components used are shared with the commercial 45 Series light truck. The truck uses the sleeper cab version of the C44 forward control cab, this having room for the driver, two passengers, and stowage for their full kit. As an alternative, the space provided may be used for driver training (the driver plus four personnel) or radio communications equipment.

The cab roof is reinforced to take the weight of two personnel and has a roof hatch and provision for a machine gun installation over an observer's platform inside the cab. For maintenance the cab can be hydraulically tilted forward 50°.

The vehicle is powered by a Leyland 313 turbocharged water-cooled four-stroke diesel engine coupled to a five-speed all-synchromesh manual gearbox and two-speed transfer case. There is permanent (4 × 4) drive. The front axle has a rating of 5,000 kg, with an offset bowl to reduce overall cab height. The rear axle has a rating of 7,500 kg.

Standard equipment included front and rear end rotating NATO tow hooks, lugs for suspended or supported recovery, helicopter lift points, and an infra-red reflective paint finish. The vehicle can be transported by C-130 Hercules transport aircraft, or underslung by CH-47 Chinook helicopter.

The standard cargo body is produced and fitted by Edbro and has a fixed flat platform and bulkhead with provision for interchangeable drop sides, tailboard, superstructure, and tarpaulin. The flat platform can be used to carry various forms of military equipment including shelters/containers, fuel pods, NATO pallets, Class 30 trackway, and medium girder bridge (MGB) sections.

Options included a winch, hydraulic crane, tipping body, tankers and specialist-vehicles for refuelling operations. The optional crane has a capacity of 6.5 t/m while the winch (produced by Reynolds Boughton) has a capacity of 5,500 kg front and rear and is provided with 75 m of cable.

In 1995 a payload option of 5-tonnes was introduced; a small number of British Army vehicles subsequently being uprated.

It was disclosed during 2006 that Permali of Gloucester had supplied 16 add-on armour kits for Leyland 4-tonne trucks deployed on operations in Afghanistan and Iraq.

== Gallery ==
Leyland 4-tonne truck

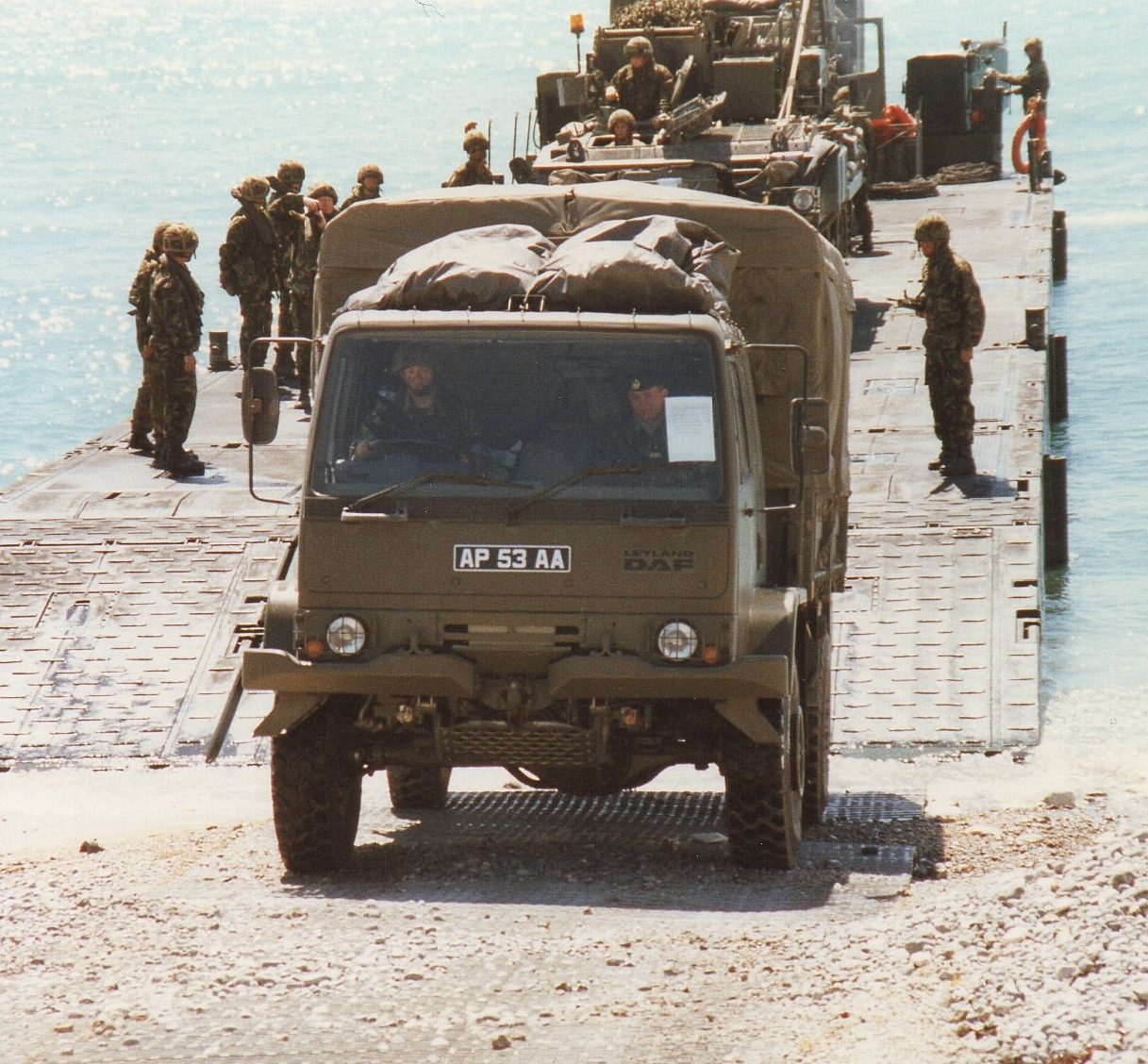
British Army Leyland 4-tonne general service (GS) truck leaving a Mexefloat pontoon.

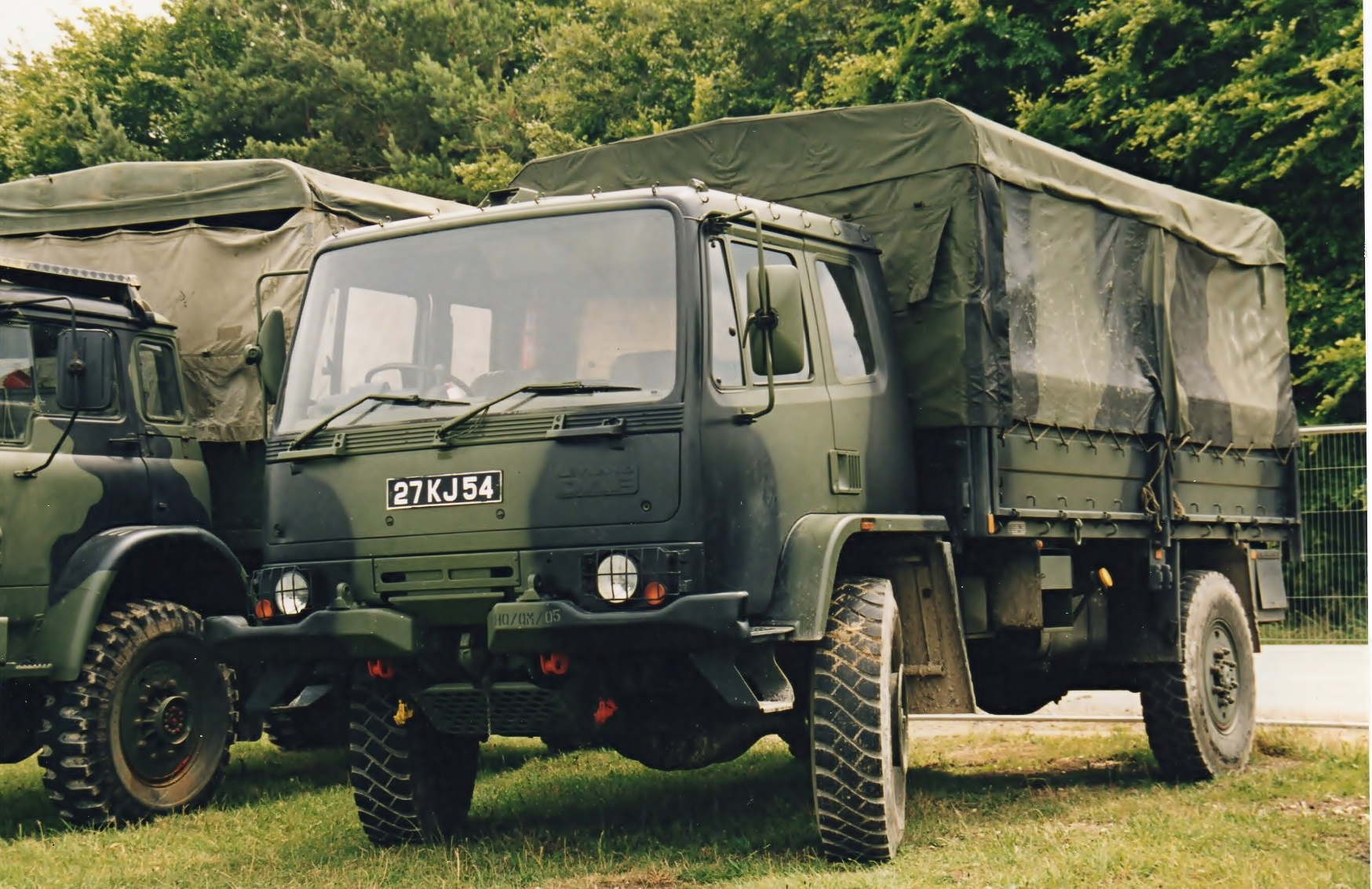
British Army Leyland 4-tonne general service (GS) truck at ARMY 2000

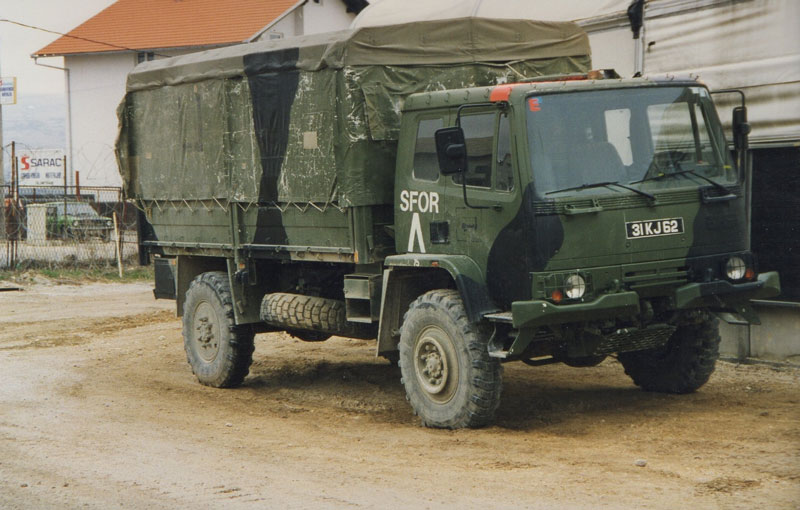
British Army Leyland 4-tonne General Service (GS) truck in the Former Yugoslavia

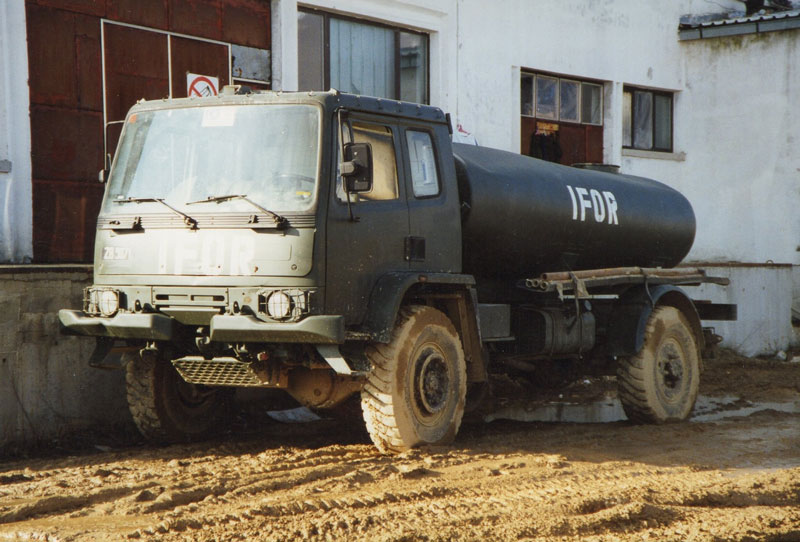
Leyland 4-tonne truck (water bowser) of the Malaysian Army in the Former Yugoslavia

== Operators ==
Unless stated, numbers given are delivery totals, not in service totals

- Afghanistan (surplus British Army post-Afghanistan withdrawal)
- Brunei (41 delivered)
- Indonesia (14 delivered)
- Ireland (52 delivered 1997–1999)
- Kenya (approx. 50 delivered 2000–2001)
- Malaysia (40; status uncertain)
- United Kingdom (4200 delivered 1990–1995; small number post-1995. Approx. 650 remain)
- Uzbekistan (50 donated in 2013; surplus from Afghanistan deployment, valued at £7000 ea.)

== Television and film appearances ==
- The Mark of Cain
- Shaun of the Dead
- Top Gear Ep17.05

== See also ==
- Rheinmetall MAN Military Vehicles (RMMV) HX range of tactical trucks
- Family of Medium Tactical Vehicles
- Bedford TK
- M35 2½-ton cargo truck
- M809 series trucks
