= Malcolm Hunt =

Major-General Malcolm Hunt OBE FRSA (born 19 November 1938) was a senior officer in the Royal Marines, Director of the NATO Defence Commitments Staff at the Ministry of Defence between 1987 and 1990 and Commander of British Forces in the Falkland Islands between 1990 and 1991.

== Life ==
Malcolm Peter John Hunt was born on 19 November 1938, the son of Peter Gordon Hunt and Rachel Margaret Hunt (née Owston). He was educated at St John's School, Leatherhead and the Staff College, Camberley.

Hunt joined the Royal Marines in 1957 and saw service in Malta, Aden and Northern Ireland. He was the officer commanding the Royal Marine detachment on HMS Nubian between 1966 and 1968. After serving as an instructor at the Army Staff College, he commanded the 40 Commando unit of the Royal Marines between 1981 and 1983 in the Falkland Islands and Northern Ireland.

Hunt served on the International Military Staff of NATO between 1984 and 1987 and was Director of the NATO Defence Commitments Staff between 1987 and 1990. Between 1990 and 1991 he was Commander of the British Forces in the Falkland Islands.

After leaving the Royal Marines in 1992, Hunt served as General Secretary of the Association of British Dispensing Opticians between 1995 and 1999.

== Honours and personal life ==
Hunt was made OBE in 1984, FRSA in 1993, a Freeman of the City of London in 1999 and a Liveryman of the Company of Spectacle Makers in 2000.

Hunt married Margaret Peat in 1962 with whom he had two sons. His first wife died in 1996 and he married, secondly, Angela Jean Payne in 2004.
