= St John's School, Leatherhead =

Public school in Leatherhead, Surrey, England

Coordinates: 51.297°N 0.323°W

St John's School

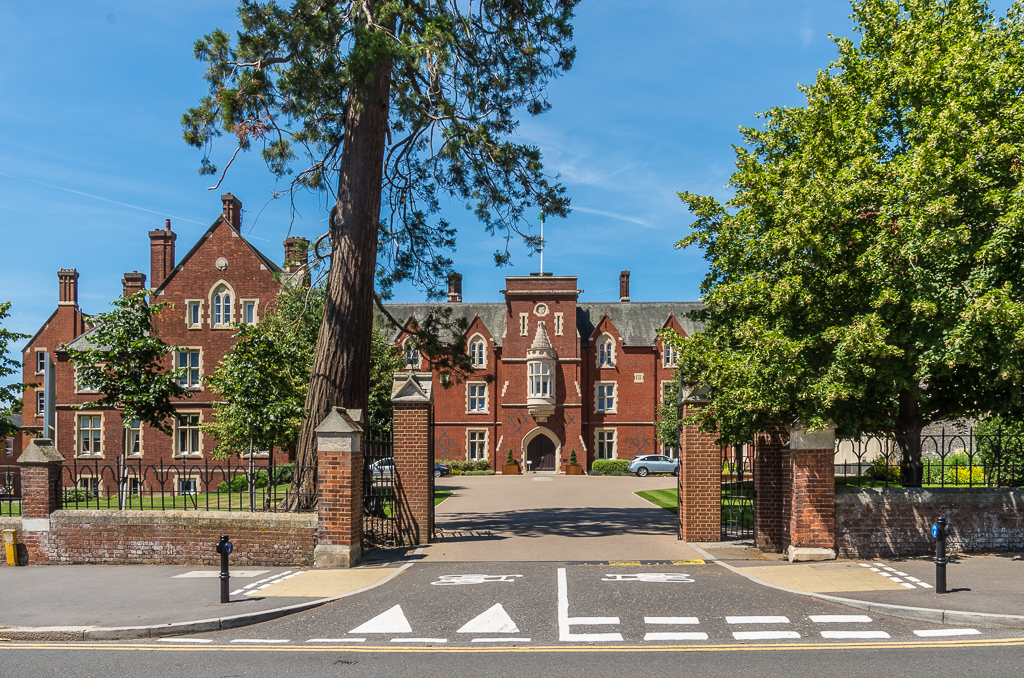
- Main entrance on Epsom Road

Location
- Epsom Road; Leatherhead, Surrey, KT22 8SP; United Kingdom

Information
- Type: Public school Private school Co-educational day, weekly and flexi boarding
- Motto: Latin: Quae Sursum Sunt Quaerite; Seek those things which are above
- Religious affiliation: Church of England
- Established: 1851; 175 years ago
- Founder: Ashby Haslewood
- Department for Education URN: 125353 Tables
- The Head: Alex Tate
- Preceded by: Rebecca Evans
- Gender: Mixed
- Age: 11 to 18
- Enrolment: 840 pupils
- Colours: Green and white
- Alumni: Old Johnians ("OJs")
- Visitor: The Archbishop of Canterbury
- Patron: The Duchess of Gloucester
- Website: www.stjohnsleatherhead.co.uk

St John's School in Leatherhead, Surrey is a fully co-educational private school for pupils aged 11 to 18. The school offers day, weekly and flexible boarding for approximately 800 pupils.

St John's was founded in 1851 to educate the sons of the clergy, and was moved from St John's Wood, London to its current site in Surrey in 1872. Set in 50 acres (20 ha), the school's site is a mixture of old and new, with mid-Victorian architecture complemented by a Science Centre, and modern classroom blocks and boarding houses.

== History ==
The school was founded in 1851 as St John's Foundational School for the Sons of Poor Clergy. Its founder was a clergyman, Ashby Haslewood, who was vicar of St Mark's, Hamilton Terrace in St John's Wood, north London. He had a dual purpose in founding the school - to offer free education for the sons of poor clergymen and to provide a choir for his large church.

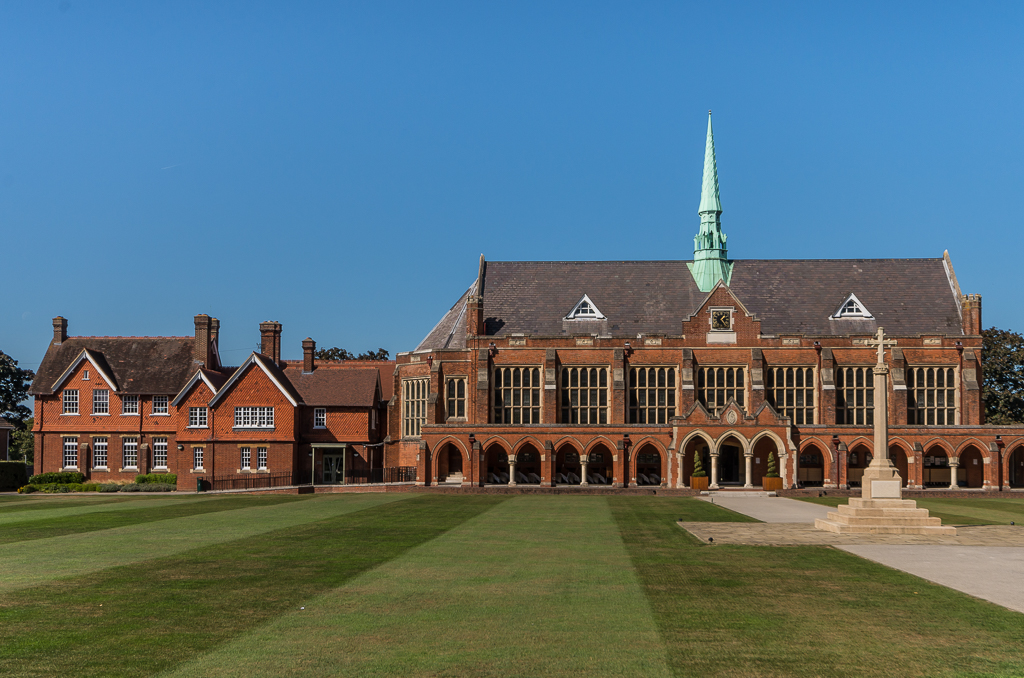
Dining Hall and the Quad War Memorial

Since the 1970s St John's, while maintaining a substantial boarding community, has taken in an increasing number of day pupils and in 1989 the first Sixth Form girls entered the school. In 2010 girls were able to join the school in the first year (fourth form) for the first time and the school has been fully co-educational since September 2012.

The school was a success but the dual purpose imposed restrictions. Later, in 1854, the school moved outside the parish boundaries of St Mark's into neighbouring Kilburn. This was the first of three moves before the school moved to Leatherhead in 1872. Reverend Edward Connerford Hawkins was one of the first headmasters, when the school was still at Clapton in north-east London. He and his wife Jane Isabella Grahame (an aunt of Kenneth Grahame, author of The Wind in the Willows) brought up their family there; their son Anthony Hope, who also grew up to be an author, was educated at the school until he was old enough to be sent to Marlborough College.

Despite much progress, it remained essentially a charity school until the significant headmastership of Arthur Rutty (HM 1883–1909) when the school developed all the characteristics of a public school.

The school began to attract fee-paying parents while remaining loyal to the sons of poor clergymen. The school expanded throughout the 20th century despite the problems faced by all public schools due to the Depression. After the Second World War, St John's was fortunate to attract the interest of the Viscount Montgomery of Alamein, himself the son of a clergyman, who was chairman of the governing body from 1951 to 1966. Montgomery's contribution to the development of the school was enormous – he promoted it, raised money for it and gave generously of his own time and wealth. His assistance facilitated the building of the new chapel, the work of architects Seely & Paget, completed in 1962, as the school had outgrown the more diminutive old chapel, which subsequently became the library, and from 2014, a venue for concerts and other events for both the school and local community. The pews towards the back of the new chapel have the names inscribed of those who died in conflict ranging from the First World War to the Korean War. The 1914–1919 roll remembers the 156 who fell in battle, the 1939–1945 panel contains 88 names, and the Korean War board bears 3 names.

== House system ==
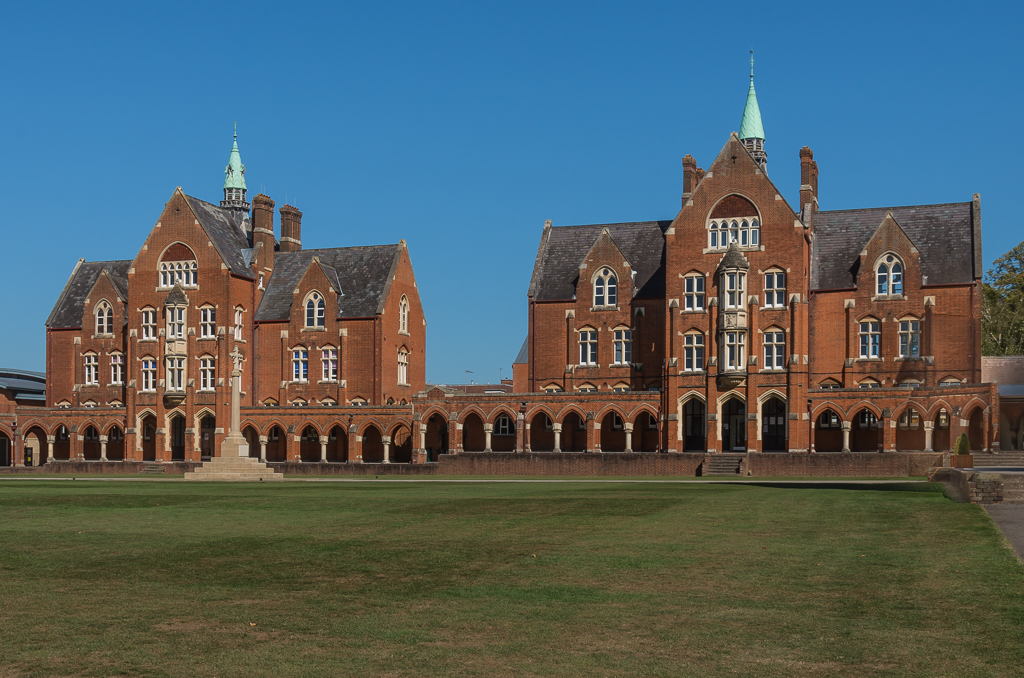
Gloucester House (left) and Montgomery House

St John's is divided into ten Houses each with its own characteristics and Housemaster/mistress, as well as most houses having a house matron. There are six boys' houses and four girls' houses, changing to five of each from September 2027.

- West - Yellow and Black (boarding)
- East - Green and Black (boarding)
- Haslewood - Light Blue and Dark Blue
- Montgomery (Monty) - Claret and Blue
- North - Red and Black
- South - Purple and Black (boarding)
- Surrey - Red and White
- Churchill - Blue and White
- Gloucester - Blue and Pink (boarding)
- Hawkins - Cambridge Blue and White

South – renamed from Hallaton – is a girls' house and comprises two buildings. Haslewood and Gloucester are both located in the heart of the school on the quad, whilst Hawkins shares its building with Churchill, opening its doors to pupils for the first time in September 2019.

== Sport ==
The school competes on a circuit across a wide variety of sports, and some pupils have gained representative honours at county, national and international level. Rugby, football, hockey, netball and cross country are major sports at St John's, alongside cricket, athletics, tennis and swimming during the summer months. During the autumn term, boys' teams focus on rugby and girls' teams compete in hockey. The spring term sports are football, netball, cross country, boys' hockey and rugby sevens. The school offers the following as additional competitive sports: badminton, biathlon, fives, golf, rounders, sailing, skiing, squash, shooting. Pupils also have the opportunity to participate in recreational sports, including Pilates, Zumba, indoor rowing, volleyball, wakeboarding and off-road cycling.

== Cricket ground ==
The first recorded match on the school cricket ground came in 1879 when the school played the Marylebone Cricket Club. Since then the school has used the ground for a number of fixtures against other schools and colleges. The ground has also held 2 List-A matches, the first of which came in 1969 when Surrey played Northamptonshire in the Player's County League. The second and final List-A match at the ground came in 1972, when Surrey played Worcestershire in the John Player League.

== Co-curricular activities ==
At St John's, pupils have the opportunity to try a range of activities. From Japanese to chess, honing their cricket skills, building a hovercraft and taking part in philosophical debates, there is an extensive list of opportunities, alongside art, music, drama, the Combined Cadet Force, the Duke of Edinburgh Award scheme and the school's community service unit.

St John's participates in the Combined Cadet Force (compulsory for one year) and the Duke of Edinburgh Award scheme. The CCF has been part of St John's for over 100 years, having been founded in 1912. Today's CCF comprises more than 350 cadets across Royal Navy, British Army and Royal Air Force sections. All Lower Fifth (Year 10) pupils take part in the CCF's weekly training sessions and can choose to continue in later years. The St John's CCF is affiliated with HMS Collingwood, the Coldstream Guards and RAF Odiham.

St John's runs a community service unit, with just over half of the school's sixth form taking part in weekly volunteer placements in the local community. These placements take place during evenings, weekends and study periods.

The school’s charitable programme includes the St John’s School Eagle Community Holiday, an annual residential week for 25 children aged 10–18 with special needs. Founded in 2014, it is supported by Sixth Form volunteers, many of whom return each year. The programme gives children opportunities to build friendships, confidence and independence, with participants able to return annually until age 18 where their needs can be accommodated.

== Notable alumni ==
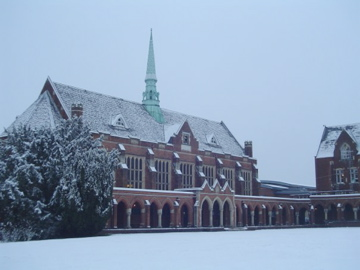
St John's Dining Hall in the snow

Former pupils of the school are known as Old Johnians or OJs.

== Notable staff ==
- Arthur Bowley, mathematics master
- Tim Crooks, Olympic Rower and BBC Superstars Champion 1977, Craft Design and Technology

== List of Heads ==
- Anthony Thomson, 1851–1857
- Lewis Mercier, 1857–1861
- Edwards Hawkins, 1861–1883
- Arthur Rutty, 1883–1909
- Edmund Downes, 1909–1932
- Jack Carter, 1932–1947
- Hereward Wake, 1948–1960
- Ian Sutherland, 1960–1970
- Edward 'Ted' Hartwell, 1970–1985
- David Brown, 1985–1992
- Christopher Tongue, 1993–2004
- Nicholas Haddock, 2004–2011
- Martin Collier, 2011–2017
- Rowena Cole, 2017–2022
- Rebecca Evans, Acting Head 2022–2023
- Alex Tate, 2023–present

== Southern Railway Schools Class ==
The school lent its name to the fortieth example of the Southern Railway's V Class steam locomotive, no. 939. This class was known widely as the Schools Class because all forty of the class were named after prominent English public schools. 'Leatherhead', as no. 939 was called, was built in 1934. The locomotive bearing the school's name was withdrawn in the early 1960s. A nameplate survives in the reception at the school, along with a small model of the engine.
