= 1982 British Army Gazelle friendly fire incident =

Helicopter downing in the Falklands War

Loss of Gazelle XX377
- Part of the Falklands War
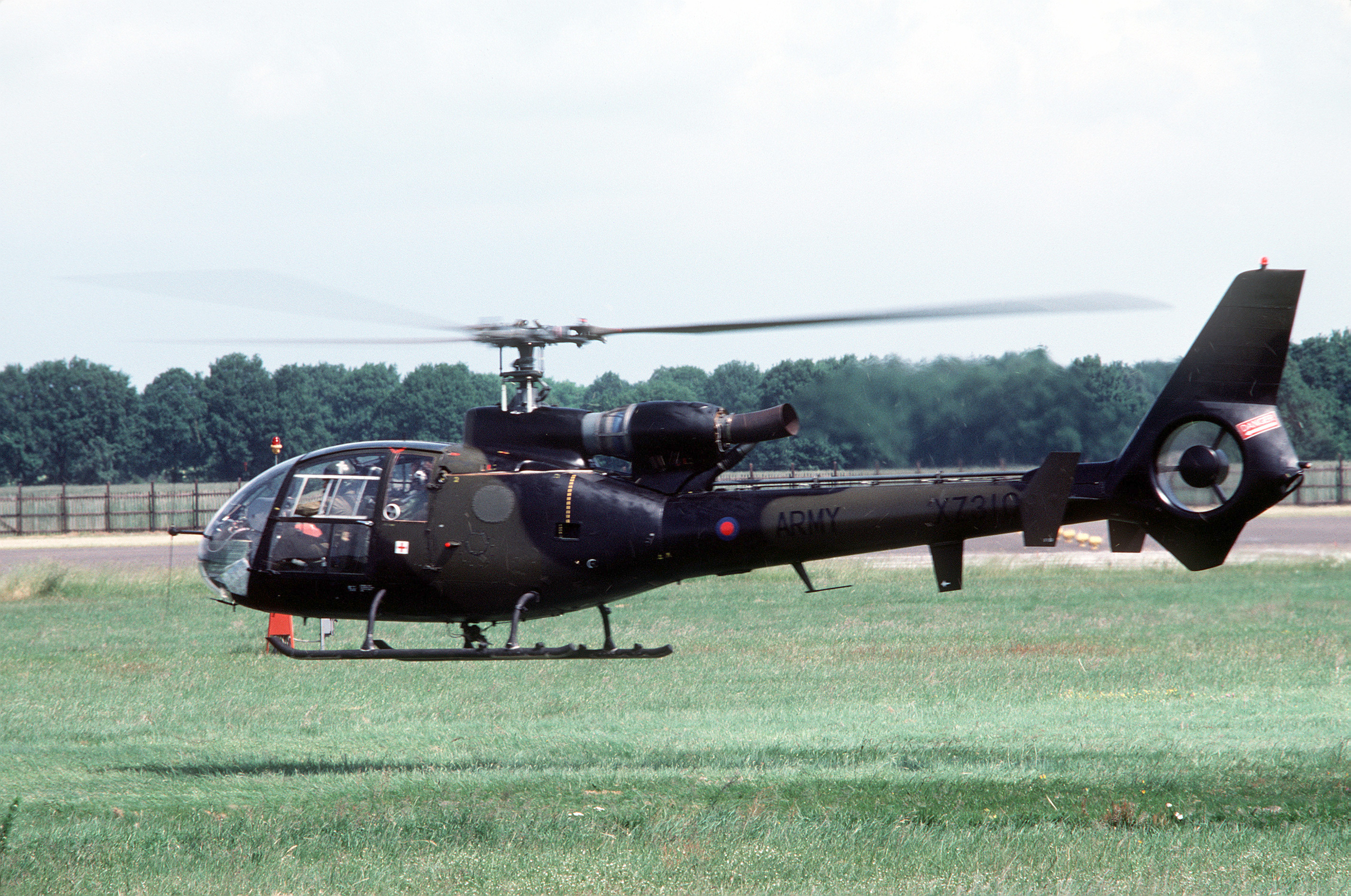
- A British Army Westland Gazelle helicopter, c. 1983
| Date | 6 June 1982 |
| Location | Pleasant Peak, Falkland Islands |
| Result | Four British soldiers killed, One British Army helicopter destroyed |

On 6 June 1982, during the Falklands War, the British Royal Navy Type 42 destroyer HMS Cardiff engaged and destroyed a British Army Westland Gazelle helicopter, serial number XX377, in a friendly fire incident, killing all four occupants. Cardiff, on the lookout for aircraft flying supplies to the Argentine forces occupying the Falkland Islands, misidentified the helicopter as an enemy Lockheed C-130 Hercules. The loss of the helicopter was initially blamed on enemy action, but a subsequent inquiry found a missile from the Cardiff to be the cause.

On the night of 5 June, HMS Cardiff was stationed to the east of the islands to provide gunfire support to the land forces and intercept enemy aircraft. At around 02:00 a radar contact was detected; a British Army Air Corps Westland Gazelle helicopter was making a routine delivery of personnel and equipment to a radio rebroadcast station on East Falkland. From the contact's speed and course, Cardiff's operations room crew assumed it to be hostile. One Sea Dart missile was fired, missing the target; a second destroyed it. The Gazelle's wreckage and crew were discovered the next morning, and the loss was attributed to enemy fire. Although Cardiff was suspected, later scientific tests on the wreckage proved inconclusive.

No formal inquiry was held until four years later. Defending their claim that the helicopter had been lost in action, the United Kingdom's Ministry of Defence (MoD) stated that they had not wanted to "cause further anguish to relatives" while they were still trying to ascertain how the Gazelle had been shot down. The board of inquiry finally confirmed that the soldiers died due to friendly fire. It recommended that "neither negligence nor blame should be attributed to any individual", but identified several factors. In a lack of communication between the army and the navy, 5th Infantry Brigade had not notified anyone of the helicopter's flight. The navy had not informed the land forces that Cardiff had changed position to set up an ambush for Argentine aircraft travelling over the area. The helicopter's identification friend or foe (IFF) transmitter was turned off because it interfered with the army's Rapier anti-aircraft missile system. The navy was not told that the army's helicopters were not using IFF. The board of inquiry's findings prompted criticism of the MoD's initial response to the incident.

== Background ==
On 2 April 1982, the British overseas territory of the Falkland Islands was invaded by neighbouring Argentina. The United Kingdom, nearly 8,000 mi (13,000 km) away, assembled and dispatched a naval task force of 28,000 troops to recapture the islands. The conflict ended that June with the surrender of the Argentine forces; the battles fought on land, at sea, and in the air had cost the lives of some 900 British and Argentine servicemen.

In early May, British troops landed at San Carlos on the western side of East Falkland, and from there moved overland towards the islands' capital of Stanley. To support the advance, logistical supplies were ferried to the troops by helicopter from San Carlos. The Argentine forces occupying Stanley were supplied throughout the war by Lockheed C-130 Hercules aircraft from the Argentine mainland. These "milk-runs", as the British termed them, were a source of concern to the Royal Navy, and various attempts were made to intercept them.

== Incident ==
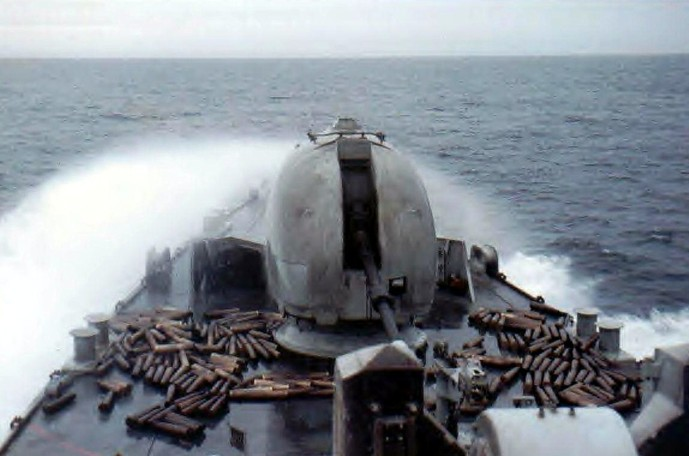
Cartridge cases from Cardiff's 4.5 inch gun (114 mm) litter her deck after providing gunfire support on 5 June.

On the night of 5 June, the British Type 42 destroyer HMS Cardiff took up station on the "Bluff Cove Gunline" to the east of the islands. Tasked with a dual mission, Cardiff was to provide fire support to the Royal Marines of 3 Commando Brigade, and to interdict any Argentine aircraft attempting to fly into Stanley. The destroyer had performed a similar role four nights previously, when she unsuccessfully attempted to shoot down a re-supply aircraft as it landed, and again as it took off.

Meanwhile, pilots Staff Sergeant Christopher Griffin and Lance Corporal Simon Cockton, of 656 Squadron Army Air Corps, had been ordered to fly equipment and personnel to a malfunctioning radio re-broadcast station on top of Pleasant Peak. The station had been established the previous day to provide a communications link between the 5th Infantry Brigade headquarters at Darwin, and the 2nd Battalion, Parachute Regiment at Fitzroy. Night flying conditions were excellent, with a clear sky, a prominent moon and a wind speed of 20 kn (37 km/h). The crew departed from Goose Green in Gazelle serial number XX377 and collected the replacement equipment from the headquarters at Darwin. They also took on board two passengers; Major Michael Forge, the OC of 205 Signal Squadron, and A Tp Staff Sergeant, Staff Sergeant John Baker. Griffin was an experienced pilot; the flight to the re-broadcast station was expected to take ten minutes.

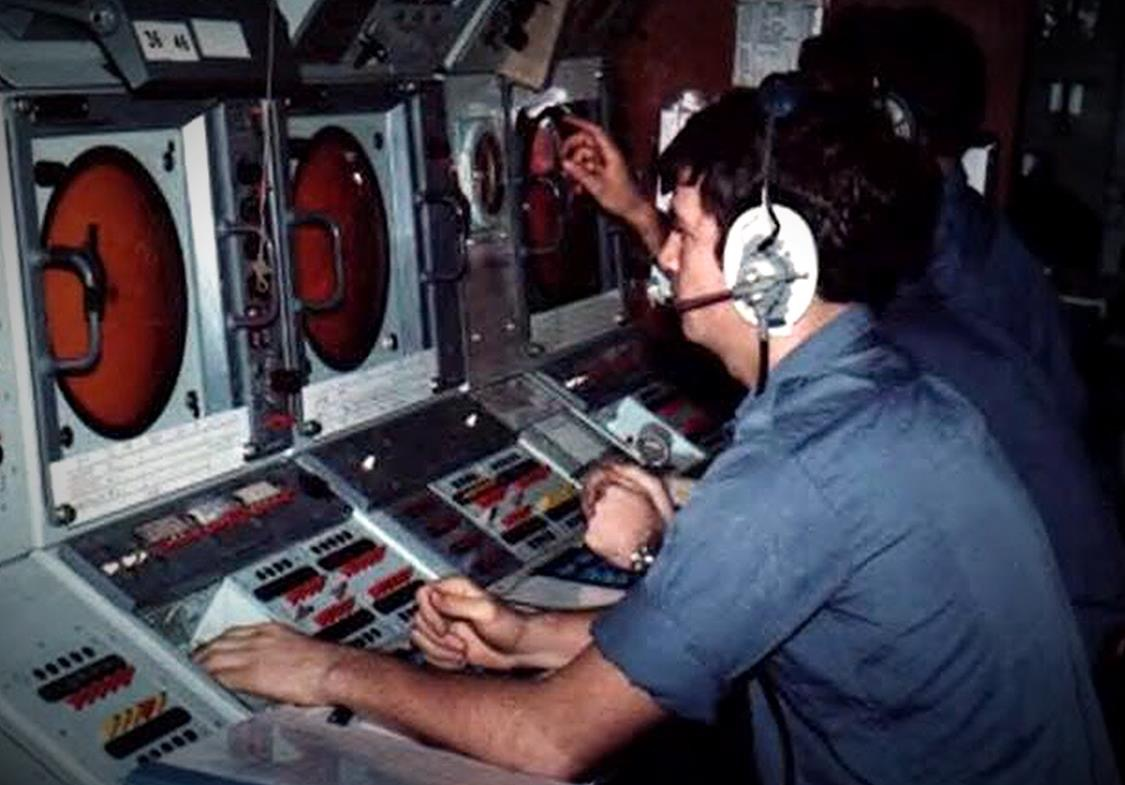
Cardiff's surface plot console

At 02:00 local time, Cardiff's operations room detected XX377 on her air search (Type 992) radar at a range of 25 nmi (46 km). The helicopter's identification friend or foe (IFF) system was turned off, so receiving no friendly transmissions and with the contact apparently heading towards Stanley, the operations room crew assumed it to be hostile. After calculating its speed they believed they were tracking an Argentine fixed-wing aircraft – either a Hercules conducting a resupply mission, or an FMA IA 58 Pucará ground-attack aircraft sent to retaliate for Cardiff's shelling. Cardiff fired two of her Sea Dart missiles. The first failed to hit the target. 5th Infantry Brigade lost radio contact with the Gazelle, and simultaneously the exploding missile was seen and heard by the re-broadcast station's personnel atop Pleasant Peak.

The helicopter's loss caused the British to suspect that Argentine forces were still operating in the area, so patrols were mounted by Gurkha soldiers. When the Gurkhas came across the personnel manning the Pleasant Peak station there was potential for another friendly fire incident to occur. At first light a proper search was carried out, and the Gazelle's wreckage was found along with the dead aircrew and passengers, 5th Infantry Brigade's first casualties of the war. Immediately there were suspicions that Cardiff had been responsible for the shootdown, and later that evening Rear Admiral "Sandy" Woodward declared a "Weapons Tight" order, forbidding the engagement of any aircraft not positively identified as hostile, for all contacts detected flying over East Falkland at less than 200 kn (370 km/h) and under 610 m (2,000 ft).

== Investigations ==
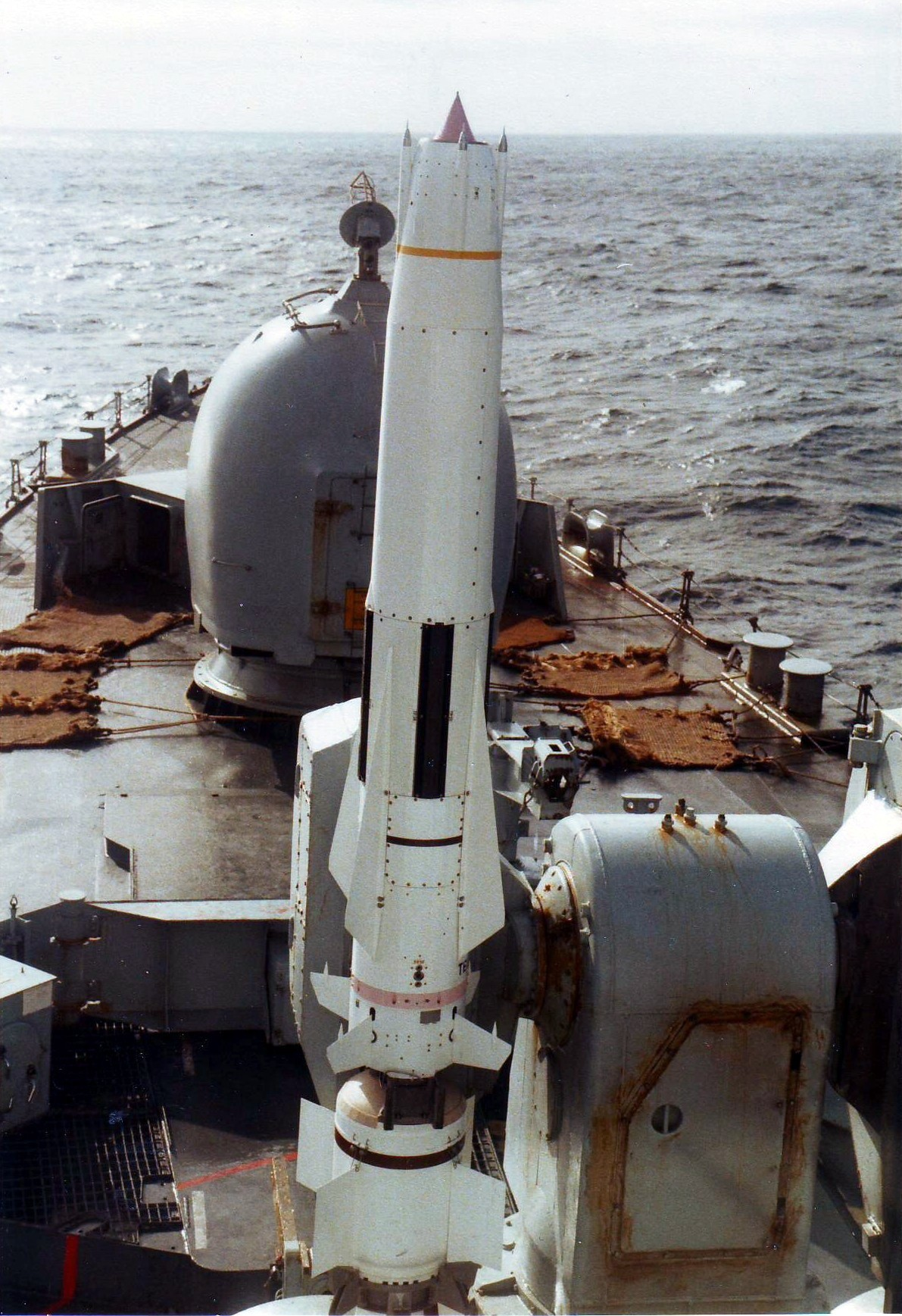
A live Sea Dart missile on HMS Cardiff in 1983

The crew's bodies were initially examined by senior medical officer, Surgeon-Captain Richard "Rick" Jolly of the Royal Navy. The helicopter's wreckage was inspected on-site, but the British were unable to determine if it had been destroyed by Cardiff's missiles or by Argentine fire. This uncertainty prompted the decision not to hold a board of inquiry, and XX377 was declared "lost in action". It was surmised that, if the relatives of the dead were told that the Gazelle might have been lost to friendly fire, it would add to their grief. After the war, missile fragments found in the wreckage were taken to the British government's aviation research facility at RAE Farnborough for analysis. The scientific tests concluded that the fragments were not from a British Sea Dart missile, despite a Sea Dart casing later being found "several hundred yards" away from the wreckage.

In December 1982 an inquest was held by a Southampton coroner into the death of Cockton after his body was repatriated to the UK. Based on RAE Farnborough's test results, the Army Air Corps submitted evidence stating that the analysis of the warhead fragments found in the wreckage indicated that the helicopter had been destroyed by a type of anti-aircraft missile "known to have been in the possession of the enemy". The test results were reviewed in November 1985 and determined that there could be "no definitive conclusion as to the exact source of the missile fragments recovered from the crash site". In June 1986, John Stanley, the Minister of State for the Armed Forces, announced in his written answers to the House of Commons: "the [Southampton] coroner has been informed accordingly."

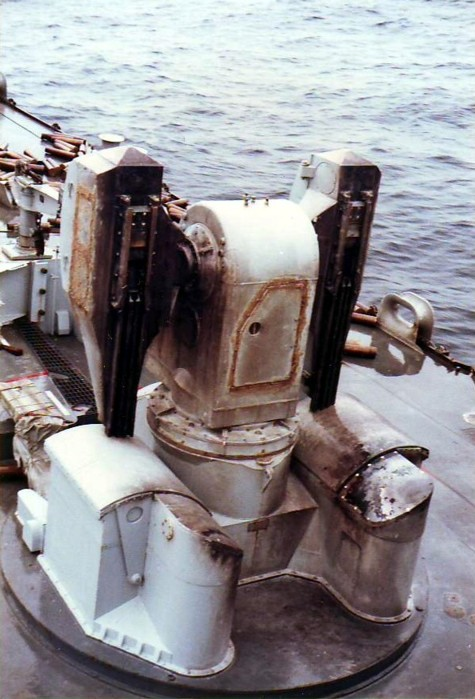
Cardiff's scorched missile launcher the morning after the shootdown

In October 1986, partly due to pressure from Cockton's mother and the anti-war politician Tam Dalyell, an official board of inquiry was opened. The board took a month to reach the conclusion that XX377 was shot down by Cardiff. Historian Hugh Bicheno remarks: "It took [the] MoD four years and two investigations, the first either incompetent or a deliberate cover-up, even to admit the Gazelle blue-on-blue." The board's findings were made public by a Freedom of Information Act request in July 2008, although Paragraph 13 of the report was redacted under Section 26 of the act as it "contains operational details of the Royal Navy's activities, which, even with the passage of time since the Falklands campaign, would be of use to potential enemies."

The board of inquiry found that standard operating procedure dictated that the commanders of 5th Infantry Brigade were not required to declare the helicopter's mission to any other authority, as the flight was to occur in brigade airspace on a brigade task. Gazelle XX377 was equipped with an IFF transmitter, but this was turned off. In the opinion of the board, "had IFF been in use there is little doubt that Cardiff would not have engaged the aircraft that night." At the time, less than half of the land force's helicopters were fitted with IFF transmitters, and those that were had been ordered not to use them because they inhibited the tracking systems of the British ground-based Rapier anti-aircraft missile batteries. A misconception about the Royal Navy's ability to engage air targets over land led to the navy not being informed that the army's helicopters were not using IFF. The board of inquiry concluded that it was this failure to communicate, together with the navy's assumption that all helicopters would be operating IFF, which "had a cumulative effect [and] was a major cause of [the] accident." However, the board recommended that "neither negligence nor blame should be attributed to any individual".

== Effects ==
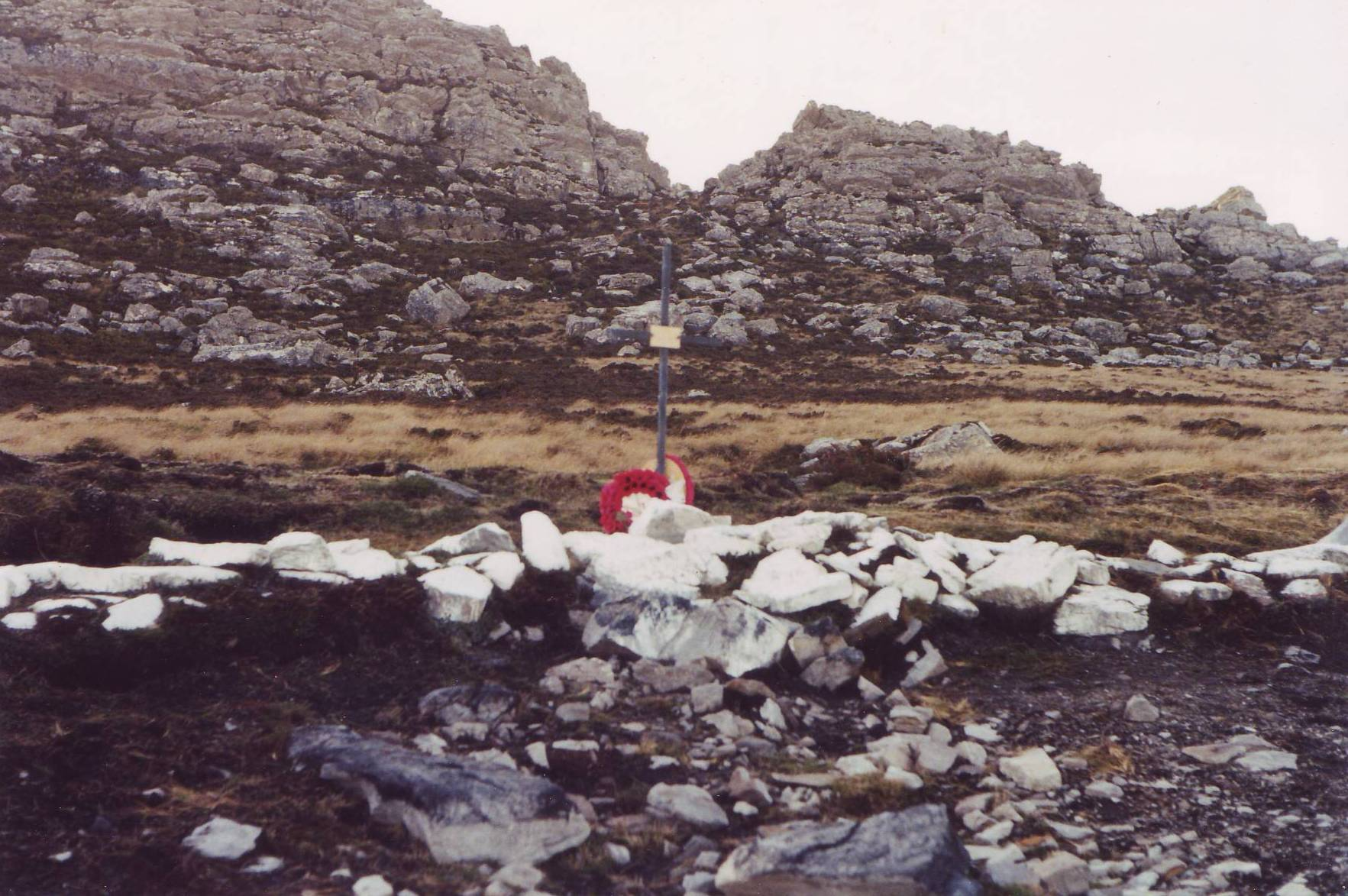
The memorial cross

Given that the role of helicopters in land force operations was increasing, as was the integration of guided missile destroyers for coastal defence, the board of inquiry recommended an amendment to NATO procedures for amphibious warfare and naval gunfire support, to alert other armed forces to the danger of underestimating a ship's missile engagement zone over land. During the late 1980s, the British government placed more emphasis on joint warfare training, with exercises, such as Purple Warrior, taking place in Oman and Scotland. The board noted the establishment of the Permanent Joint Headquarters, designed to put an end to the "ad hoc and reactive way" in which operations had been carried out while under single service control. IFF transmitters were fitted to all Army Air Corps and Royal Marine Gazelle and Westland Lynx helicopters, and the problem of operating IFF in the vicinity of Rapier batteries was successfully addressed. The board supported a recommendation that the responsibilities of naval gunfire-support liaison officers could be broadened to include the interpretation of air defence problems during inshore joint warfare operations.

A memorial cross was installed on Pleasant Peak, and the number "205" was painted at the crash site by the soldiers of 205 Signal Squadron. The number is approximately 40 m (130 ft) wide and can be seen from the air at (51°47′01″S 58°28′04″W).

== See also ==
- List of accidents and incidents involving military aircraft (1980–1989)
