= Richard Lehman =

Richard Lehman may refer to:

- Richard Lehman (CIA officer) (1923–2007)
- Richard H. Lehman (born 1948), California representative
- Dick Lehman (Richard D. Lehman), American ceramics artist

== See also ==
- Richard Leaman (born 1956), British charity executive and former senior Royal Navy officer
