= Surface plot =

Surface plot may refer to:

- Surface plot (mathematics), a graph of a function of two variables
- Surface plot (graphics), the visualization of a surface
- Surface plot (radar)
