= No. 656 Squadron AAC =

Flying squadron of the British Army's Army Air Corps

656 Squadron AAC No. 656 Squadron RAF
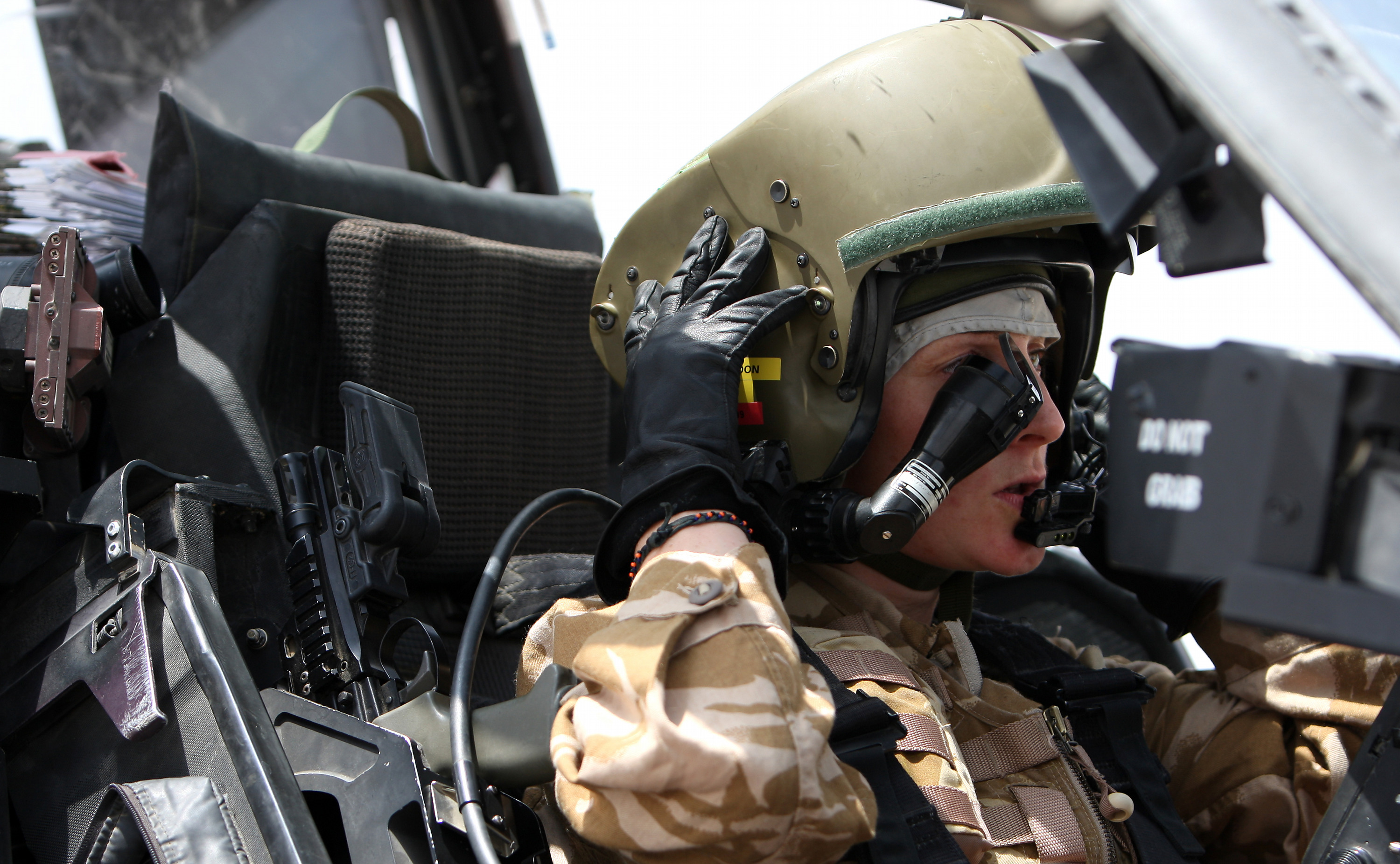
- Apache pilot of 656 Sqn (2009)
- Active: 31 Dec 1942 – 15 Jan 1947 (RAF); 29 Jun 1948 – 1 Sep 1957 (RAF); 1 Sep 1957 – present
- Country: United Kingdom
- Branch: British Army
- Type: Aviation
- Part of: 4 Regiment Army Air Corps
- Mottos: Latin: Volans et videns ("Flying and seeing")

Aircraft flown
- Attack helicopter: Boeing AH64E Apache

656 Squadron AAC is a squadron of the British Army Air Corps (AAC). It was chosen as one of the new AAC AgustaWestland Apache squadrons and in April 2004 started its conversion. The first phase was completed in October 2004. The squadron was the first operational Apache squadron in the Army Air Corps and was awarded fully operational status along with the remainder of 9 Regiment AAC in June 2005. It is under 4 Regiment AAC as of 2007.

It was formerly No. 656 Squadron RAF, an air observation post unit of the Royal Air Force in India and Burma during the Second World War and afterwards in British Malaya. Numbers 651 to 663 Squadron of the RAF were air observation post units working closely with British Army units in artillery spotting and liaison. Their duties and squadron numbers were transferred to the Army with the formation of the Army Air Corps on 1 September 1957 With this it became 656 Light Aircraft Squadron Army Air Corps.

== History ==
=== Royal Air Force ===
Formation and Second World War

No. 656 Squadron was formed at RAF Westley on 31 December 1942. It embarked for India in August 1943 and went into action during the Burma campaign with the Fourteenth Army. Several officers were decorated, among them Captain Edward Maslen-Jones who was awarded the Distinguished Flying Cross and the Military Cross.

The squadron's motto was Latin: Volans et videns (Translation: "Flying and seeing") and its identification symbol was "In front of two gun barrels in saltire, a Chinthe head".

The squadron was to take part in the Allied invasion of Malaya, but the Japanese surrendered before this took place and the squadron disbanded on 15 January 1947.

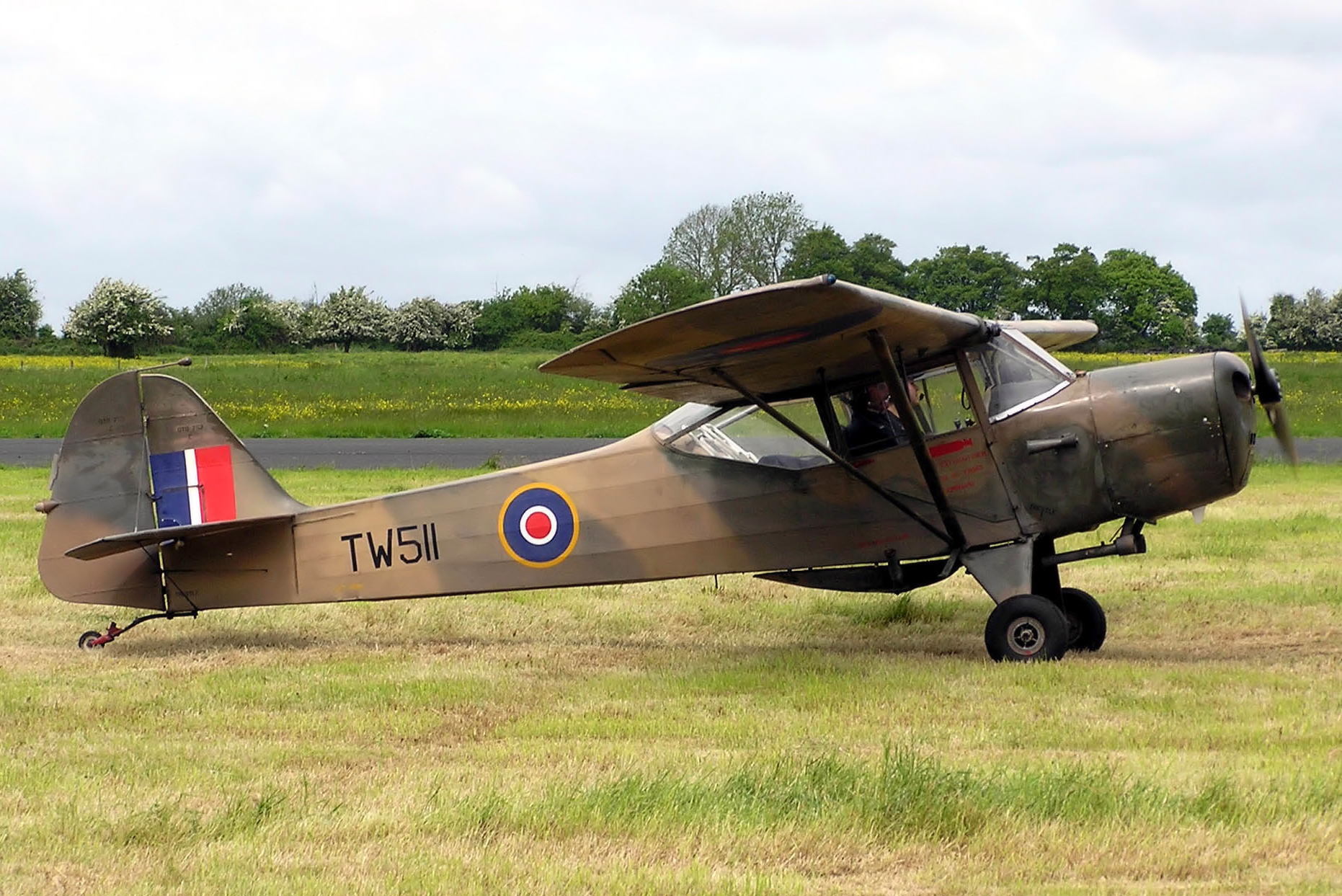
An Auster Mk.V, restored in wartime colours.

Date	Location	Notes	Date	Location	Notes	Date	Location	Notes
31 December 1942	RAF Westley	formed	12 April 1944	Dimapur, India		24 September 1945	Kelanang	
16 March 1943	RAF Stapleford Tawney		24 June 1944	Ranchi, India		14 November 1945	Kuala Lumpur (Noble Field), Malaysia	RMAF Subang Air Base?
31 August 1943	to Far East		18 October 1944	Palel, India		15 January 1946	Kemajoran, Indonesia	
15 September 1943	Worli, India		4 January 1945	Kalemyo, Myanmar		28 November 1946	Kuala Lumpur (Noble Field), Malaysia	
21 September 1943	Juhu, India		14 February 1945	Monywa		15 January 1947	disbanded	
1 October 1943	Deolali, India		26 April 1945	Meiktila				
29 January 1944	Maunghnama, India		16 May 1945	Mingaladon				
8 February 1944	Bawli, India		17 June 1945	Coimbatore, India				

Reformation and Operation Firedog

The squadron reformed from No. 1914 Flight RAF on 29 June 1948 at Sembawang in Malaya and served in British Malaya to support Army and Police against Communist guerillas before it went over to Army control in September 1957. 656 Squadron performed a total of 143,000 operations in Malaya during Operation Firedog.

No. 1914 Air Observation Post Flight was formed within 656 Squadron.

Date	Location	Notes
29 June 1948	Sembawang	reformed
17 August 1949	Changi	
12 April 1950	Kuala Lumpur	
1 September 1957	disbanded	

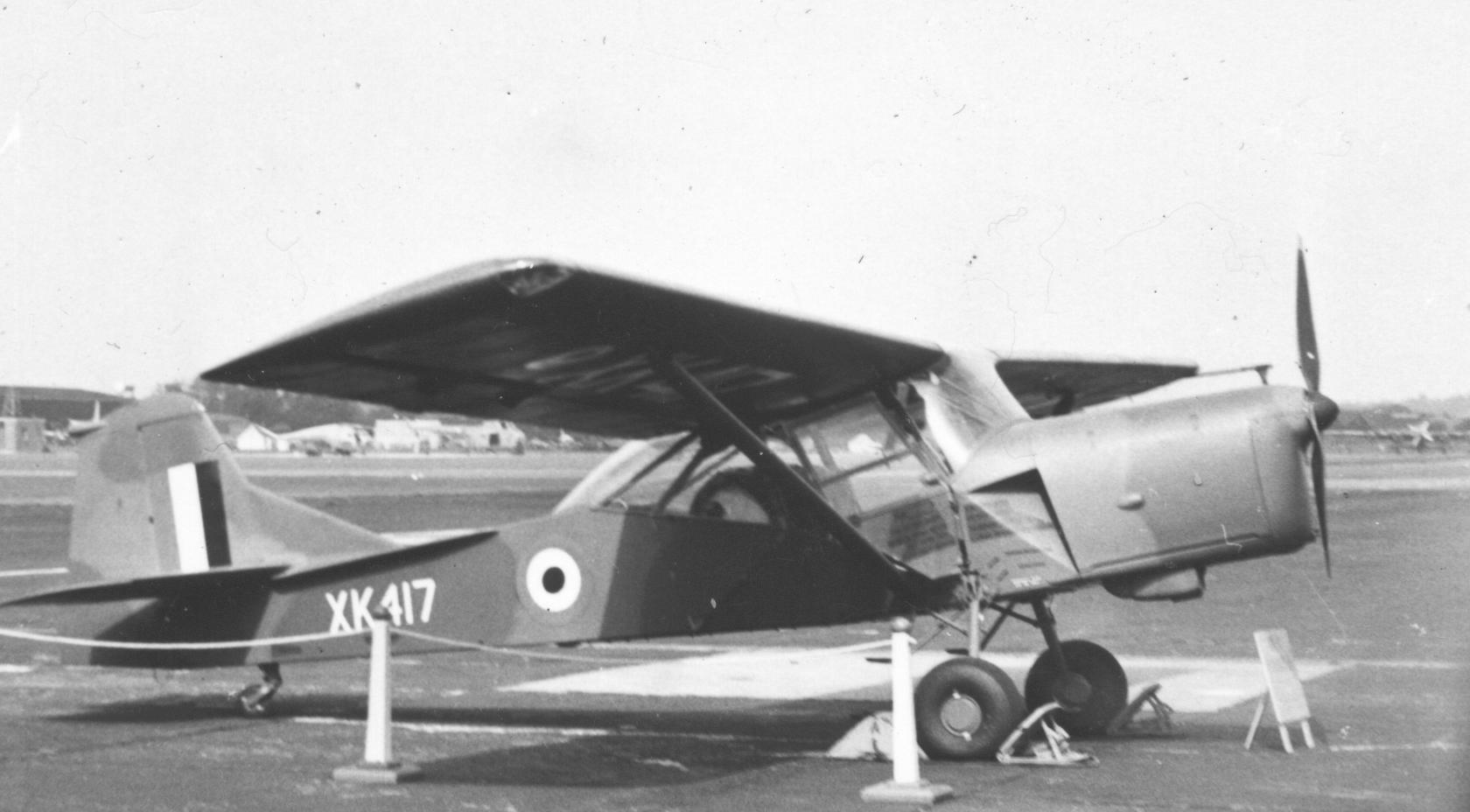
An AOP.9 at Farnborough, September 1956.

Aircraft operated by No. 656 Squadron RAF, data from
From	To	Aircraft	Variant
January 1943	August 1943	de Havilland Tiger Moth	MII
January 1943	March 1943	Taylorcraft Auster	I
February 1943	August 1943	Auster	III
November 1943	June 1945	Auster	III
October 1944	June 1945	Auster	IV
February 1945	January 1947	Auster	V
June 1948	May 1951	Auster	V
July 1950	April 1956	Auster	AOP.6
September 1955	September 1957	Auster	AOP.9

=== Army Air Corps ===
The squadron then reformed as an AAC Squadron on 1 September 1957. 656 Light Aircraft Squadron's time in the Far East continued with tours in Singapore, Borneo and Hong Kong.

With the exception of two flights, the squadron was disbanded in 1977 and finally returned to the UK to be reformed in Farnborough, from where it participated in Operation Agila (Rhodesia) and Operation Corporate (The Falklands War) in 1982.

==== Falklands War ====
Following the landings at San Carlos on 21 May 1982 and prior to the arrival of the 5th Infantry Brigade a week later, three Scouts from 656 Squadron were under the operational command of 3 Commando Brigade Air Squadron (3CBAS) alongside the six Scouts of B Flight. When 5th Infantry Brigade landed, the Scouts reverted to Squadron command on 1 June and undertook casualty evacuation (CASEVAC), re-supply and Special Forces insertion tasks.

===== XT629 loss to Argentine Pucarás =====
On 28 May 1982, during the Battle of Goose Green, Westland Scout XT629 of B Flight, 3 CBAS was undertaking resupply and casualty evacuation for 2 Para when, at approximately 08:30, it and a second Scout were engaged north of Camilla Creek House by two Pucarás from Grupo 3 de Ataque, operating from Stanley Airfield.

Pucará A-537, piloted by Lieutenant Miguel Giménez, struck XT629 on its starboard side, causing it to crash. The pilot, Lieutenant Richard Nunn DFC, was killed. Aircrewman Sergeant Anthony Belcher RM was thrown clear but sustained severe injuries, resulting in the amputation of a leg after evacuation to HMS Hecla.

XT629 was the only Argentine air-to-air victory of the conflict, underscoring the vulnerability of British helicopters to fixed-wing aircraft. Lieutenant Giménez, flying a damaged aircraft, attempted to return to Stanley but crashed into Blue Mountain. His remains were not found until 29 August 1986 and he was later interred with military honours at the Argentine military cemetery at Darwin on the 4 October 1986.

===== Loss of XR628 =====
On 8 June 1982, XR628 suffered a main-rotor gearbox failure and made a forced landing in four feet of water. The two-man crew and three passengers were rescued later that day. XR628 was air-lifted to Fitzroy by a Sea King but was written off on return to the UK.

===== SS.11 missile attack =====
On 14 June 1982, during the final stages of the war, 656 Squadron attacked an 105 mm Pack Howitzer battery near Port Stanley that had been providing artillery support to Argentine forces. Intelligence from forward elements identified the gun positions, and two Scouts approached at low level to launch SS.11 Anti-tank guided missiles against the battery. Six missiles were fired, destroying at least three howitzers, ammunition stores and support vehicles.

===== Gazelle friendly-fire incident =====
In the early hours of 6 June 1982, a Gazelle helicopter XX377 was shot down over Pleasant Peak in a friendly fire incident. All four occupants, the pilot, crewman and two passengers from 205 Signal Squadron, were killed. Contributing factors included the lack of an Identification Friend or Foe transmitter on the Gazelle and poor communication between units. The number “205” was later painted at the crash site as a memorial.

==== Subsequent history ====
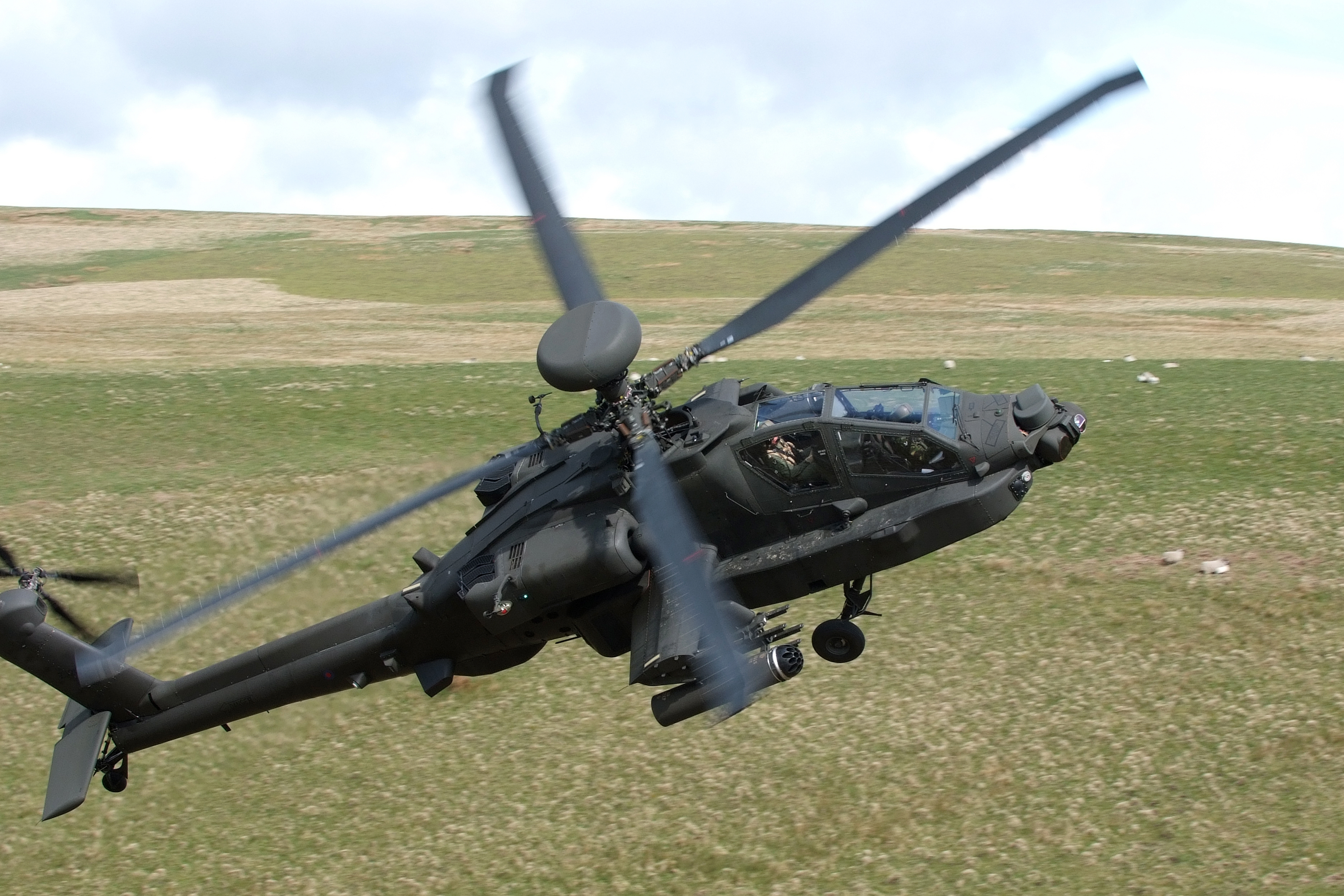
An Apache helicopter from 4 Regiment, 656 Squadron Army Air Corps, during live firing training at Otterburn Ranges in Northumberland.

After a short stay at Netheravon as part of 7 Regt AAC, the squadron relocated to Dishforth as one of the Anti Tank Squadrons of 9 Regt AAC in 1993. The squadron was chosen as one of the AAC new Apache squadrons and in April 2004 started its conversion to role. The first phase of this completed in October 2004. The squadron was the first operational Apache squadron in the Army Air Corps and reached fully operational status along with the remainder of 9 Regt AAC in June 2005.

Since this the squadron has carried out, various exercises in support of Maritime the most notable being exercise "Pixus" in support of HMS Ocean in September – October 2005. The squadron was then moved back to a land role in preparation for deployment. 2006 saw the squadron act as lead aviation for the deployment to Afghanistan in May.

The squadron's deployments to Afghanistan in May 2006 and again in May 2007 have been documented and brought into the public eye by the books of former squadron weapons officer, WO1 Ed Macy, Apache and Hellfire. In 2007, it became part of 4 Regiment, Army Air Corps.

In May 2011, several of its Apache helicopters are deployed on the Response Force Task Group COUGAR 11 deployment. They are now re-deployed to Operation Unified Protector. In October 2013, Apache Helicopters from 656 AAC launched from HMS Illustrious as part of the Response Force Task Group's COUGAR 13 deployment.

The squadron has since converted to the new Boeing AH64E Apache.

- Locations and notes:
  - Kluang (1962)
    Kuching (1965)
    Seremban (1968)
    Farnborough (1980)
  - Formerly No. 656 Light Aircraft Squadron AAC
    Became HQ No. 4 Wing AAC on 1 Oct 1965 - acting as Aviation HQ Borneo
    Formerly Hong Kong Aviation Squadron AAC (Feb - Dec 1969)
    Sioux AH.1 & Scout AH.1 Flights (1970–75)
    Sioux AH.1 & Gazelle AH.1 Flights (November 1975 - 77)
    Renamed No. 11 Flight AAC (Jun 1977)

== See also ==
- 1982 British Army Gazelle friendly fire incident
- List of Army Air Corps aircraft units
