= Operation Pacific =

1951 war drama film by George Waggner

- Theatrical release poster
- Directed by: George Waggner
- Written by: George Waggner
- Produced by: Louis Edelman
- Starring: John Wayne; Patricia Neal; Ward Bond; Philip Carey
- Cinematography: Bert Glennon
- Edited by: Alan Crosland, Jr.
- Music by: Max Steiner
- Distributed by: Warner Bros. Pictures
- Release date: January 27, 1951
- Running time: 111 minutes
- Country: United States
- Language: English
- Budget: $1,465,000
- Box office: $3,863,000 $2.45 million (US rentals)

Operation Pacific is a 1951 submarine war film produced by Louis Edelman and written and directed by George Waggner. The Warner Bros. film stars John Wayne and Patricia Neal.

Much of the film is set aboard a Gato-class submarine. The technical advisor was World War II admiral Charles A. Lockwood, the Commander, Submarine Force, U.S. Pacific Fleet (COMSUBPAC).

== Plot ==
During World War II, the submarine USS Thunderfish, under the command of Commander John T. "Pop" Perry, while on a special mission to the Philippines, is charged with rescuing a group of nuns and children, including a newborn infant nicknamed Butch, and transporting them to Pearl Harbor. On their way, the crew sights a Japanese aircraft carrier and attacks, but its torpedoes malfunction, exploding halfway to the target. Attacked and pursued by the carrier's escorting destroyers, Thunderfish manages to escape.

While in Pearl Harbor, the ship's executive officer, Lieutenant Commander Duke E. Gifford, visits Butch at the base hospital, where he encounters his ex-wife, Lt. Mary Stuart, a Navy nurse, and they kiss passionately. Mary is romantically involved with Navy pilot Lt. Bob Perry, Pop's younger brother. Duke pursues Mary anyway but is sent to sea again before anything is settled.

As the sub returns from patrol, the crew spots a Japanese freighter, but again their torpedoes fail to explode. The enemy ship raises the white flag and Thunderfish surfaces and approaches. The freighter is a heavily armed Q-ship that opens fire on the sub. Mortally wounded, Commander Perry orders the sub to crash dive, knowing that he will not survive the maneuver.

Duke, now in command, orders a "battle surface" behind the ship. On surfacing, Gifford orders the boat's deck guns and anti-aircraft guns, as well as numerous portable light and mountable heavy machine guns operated by the deck crew, to fire at will. After the Q-ship's bridge is disabled and the ship is set afire, Duke orders flank speed, ramming the sub into the Japanese ship, holing and sinking the Q-ship.

Thunderfish limps home for repairs to her damaged bow. Back at Pearl Harbor, Bob Perry believes that Duke's order to dive the boat killed his brother, and he refuses to listen to Duke's explanation. Mary tries to comfort Duke, but he rejects her attempts, declaring that he only did his duty and feels no regret.

Working with the sub base's torpedo specialists, Duke and the crew investigate why the torpedoes are not exploding. When they finally discover the answer, Duke goes to Mary to celebrate, but she rejects him. As he would not allow her into his life when he was at his lowest, she feels that they cannot have a real relationship. Her superior, Commander Steele, overhears the conversation and castigates Mary for ruining her chance for happiness with Duke.

Thunderfish again heads to sea, this time as part of a scouting line searching for a Japanese fleet heading for Leyte to attack the American invasion force. Thunderfish finds the enemy, and although it will reveal their presence, Duke broadcasts the fleet's position. When Pearl Harbor acknowledges the message, Duke salvoes his torpedoes, throwing the attacking Japanese warships into chaos. Despite a battering from Japanese depth charges, Thunderfish sinks a Japanese aircraft carrier.

In the next phase of the battle, American carrier aircraft arrive and attack the Japanese fleet. Thunderfish, now assigned to lifeguard duty, helps to rescue downed American flyers while under attack from Japanese fighters. While rescuing the wounded Bob Perry, the chief of the boat and Junior, a seaman from a Navy family, are killed and Duke is wounded by a strafing Japanese Zero.

When the Thunderfish returns to Pearl Harbor after the patrol, Mary is waiting for Duke. Reconciled, they head to the hospital, intending to adopt Butch.

== Cast ==
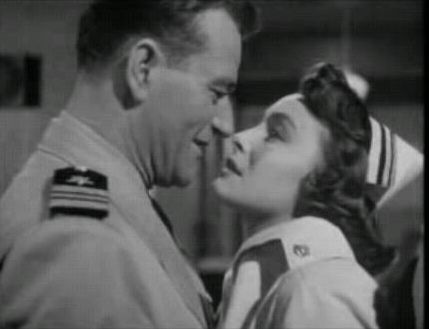
Wayne and Neal

- John Wayne as Lt. Cmdr. Duke E. Gifford
- Patricia Neal as Lt. (j.g.) Mary Stuart
- Ward Bond as Cmdr. John T. "Pop" Perry
- Scott Forbes as Lt. Larry
- Philip Carey as Lt. (j.g.) Bob Perry
- Paul Picerni as Jonesy
- William Campbell as the Talker
- Kathryn Givney as Cmdr. Steele
- Martin Milner as Ensign Caldwell
- Cliff Clark as Commander, SUBPAC
- Jack Pennick as the Chief
- Virginia Brissac as Sister Anna
- Vincent Fotre as Soundman
- Lewis Martin as Squad Commander
- Sam Edwards as Junior
- James Flavin Mick Shore Patrol Commander (uncredited)
- Harry Lauter Freddie Commanding Officer Submarine Corvena (uncredited)
- Milburn Stone Ground Control Officer (uncredited)
- Frank Sutton as Chief Gunners Mate (uncredited)
- Louis Mosconi as Radarman Mosconi

== Production ==
John Wayne and Patricia Neal had an acrimonious relationship during filming. Nearly 14 years later when they worked together on In Harm's Way (1965), Neal noted a change in his demeanor, possibly because he was seriously ill with lung cancer. The special mission shown at the beginning of the film, in which Navy submarines ran war supplies into the Philippines and evacuate civilians, is historically accurate. By the time of the invasion of the Philippines in 1944, these supply runs had enabled American and Philippine officers who had refused to surrender to build a military organization that was the size of an army corps.

The numerous problems with the Mark 14 torpedo and its Mark VI exploder depicted in the film are accurate. The event portrayed in the film was based on an attack by the submarine Tinosa (SS-283) on the Japanese ship Tonan Maru No. 3 on October 5–6, 1943, during which 13 of the 15 torpedoes that were fired failed to detonate upon impact.

The scene in which Commander Perry is killed in surface action is a combination of two incidents involving Commander Howard W. Gilmore, captain of USS Growler (SS-215). Mortally wounded on the bridge, Gilmore gave the order "Take her down!", sacrificing himself to save his submarine and crew, for which he was posthumously awarded the Medal of Honor. The ramming and sinking of the armed freighter depicted in the scene occurred in the same action, just prior to Gilmore's death.

The sequence in which the Thunderfish discovers the Japanese fleet of aircraft carriers, battleships and cruisers steaming through Surigao Strait was inspired by the actions of USS Darter (SS-227) and USS Dace (SS-247) in the opening phase of the Battle of Leyte Gulf.

Composer Max Steiner incorporated dramatic music from his score for King Kong. Warner Bros. also recycled Steiner's main theme from the 1948 film Fighter Squadron, "We Watch the Skyways", first used as the main title for the 1941 film Dive Bomber.

== Reception ==
According to Warner Bros. accounts, the film earned $2,563,000 domestically and $1,300,000 in foreign countries.

== See also ==
- John Wayne filmography
