= Christopher Clayton =

Royal Navy Rear Admiral (born 1951)

Rear Admiral Christopher Clayton CB DSO
- Born: 21 May 1951 (age 75)
- Military career
- Allegiance: United Kingdom
- Branch: Royal Navy
- Service years: 1972–2007
- Rank: Rear admiral
- Commands: HMS Chatham (1995); Commodore Naval Aviation (2000); HMS Ocean (2003)
- Conflicts: Falklands War; 2003 invasion of Iraq
- Awards: Mention in Dispatches

Rear Admiral Christopher Hugh Trevor Clayton (born 21 May 1951) is a former Royal Navy officer who served as a Lynx helicopter pilot during the Falklands War. He went on to become a senior naval officer, commanding ships during the Hong Kong handover ceremony and 2003 invasion of Iraq and later serving high-level positions in NATO.

== Early career and Falklands War ==
Clayton was educated at St John's School, Leatherhead. After school he joined the Royal Navy as an aviator and was appointed an acting sub-lieutenant on 29 February 1972. After flying training, he was then commissioned as a sub-lieutenant on 29 November 1973. After being promoted to lieutenant on 16 October 1974, Clayton was selected for a Full Career Commission in 1980, transferring to the General List.

On 2 April 1982, the disputed British overseas territory of the Falkland Islands was invaded by neighbouring Argentina. The United Kingdom, nearly 8,000 miles (13,000 km) away, assembled and dispatched a naval task force of 28,000 troops to recapture the islands. The conflict ended that June with the surrender of the Argentine forces; the battles fought on land, at sea, and in the air had cost the lives of some 900 British and Argentine servicemen.

Clayton served on HMS Cardiff, piloting their HAS.3 Lynx helicopter, serial no. 335 or "IVOR", as part of 815 Naval Air Squadron. Cardiff arrived at the islands late in the conflict on 26 May. Cardiff's primary role was to form part of the anti-aircraft warfare picket, using her anti-air Sea Dart missiles to protect British ships and attempting to ambush Argentine re-supply aircraft. She was also required to fire at enemy positions with her 4.5-inch gun.

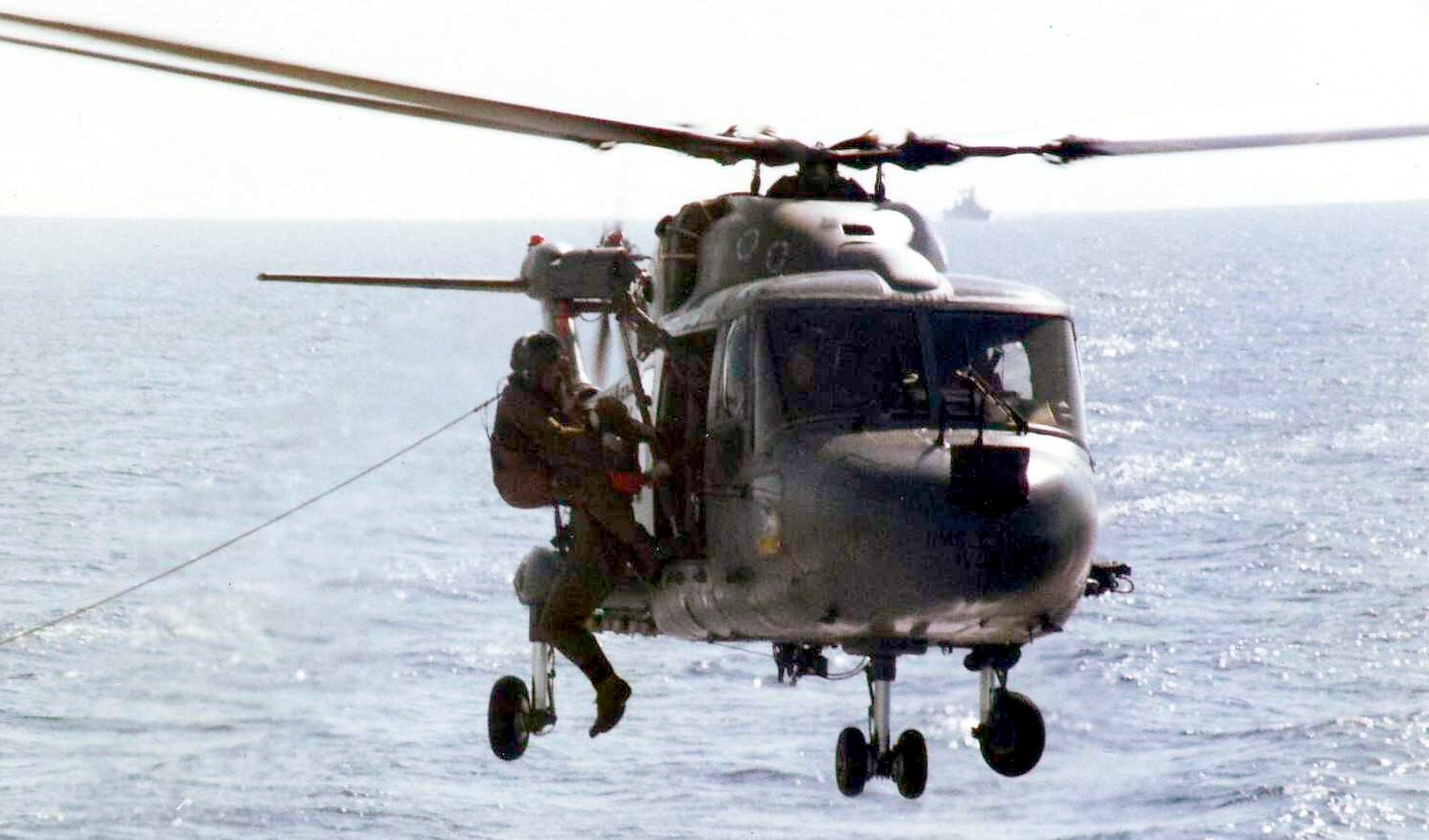
Clayton piloting Cardiff's Lynx helicopter

On 13 June, around midday, Clayton was performing the routine forenoon clearance search of the area south of the Falkland Sound. Two Argentine Daggers of Gaucho flight (Note: Gaucho flight originally consisted of three Daggers, Lt Aguirre's aircraft had to remain at the Rio Gallegas airbase due to a brake failure.) spotted Clayton's Lynx and jettisoned their external fuel tanks in preparation to engage. (Note: A common practice to reduce drag and weight in combat situations.) They began strafing the helicopter with their cannons, but Clayton evaded the attacks and managed to escape. The Daggers returned home empty-handed, their original mission had been to attack British positions on Mount Longdon with retarded bombs. After the initial Argentine surrender, Clayton flew the OC of 40 Commando, Lt Col Malcolm Hunt, to Port Howard to accept the surrender of the Argentine garrison stationed there. In recognition of his service during the war, Clayton was awarded a Mention in Dispatches.

== Commands ==
Clayton was promoted to commander on 31 December 1988, then to a captain on 31 December 1995. Clayton commanded the Type 22 frigate HMS Chatham during the 1997 Hong Kong handover ceremony. Hong Kong had been a British colony since 1841, but Britain's lease was due to finish and control was to be handed to the People's Republic of China. Chatham's role was to act as guardship for the royal yacht HMY Britannia, Clayton said of the experience; "There is no sense of withdrawal, this is very much one professional armed forces handing over the protection and sovereignty of Hong Kong to another, the People's Liberation Army. So I look on it as a classic military evolution and one which we hope to do with some style, orderly, and professionally."

He became the first officer to hold the post of "Commodore Naval Aviation" (COMNA), he was based at Northwood Headquarters during this time. This post directed the Royal Navy's anti-submarine helicopters.

Clayton commanded the helicopter carrier HMS Ocean during the 2003 invasion of Iraq. Ocean was the UK's lead amphibious landing ship, providing sea-based logistics to the Royal Marine's 3 Commando Brigade and acting as a launch pad for their attack on the Al-Faw Peninsula. Her helicopters also played a role in securing the city of Basra. When interviewed about the experience Clayton said; "There's a sense of pride in a job really well done. [Ocean] played a major role in the operations out there. But also we have to remember that we're the lucky ones coming back. Not everyone has. There are many we have to think about, including one of our ship's company who was killed in action, Marine Chris Maddison. Our thoughts will be about him and with his family."

== Later career ==
Clayton became a rear admiral on 30 August 2004 and took a post at NATO's headquarters in Brussels. His role was as an assistant director, in charge of the Intelligence Division of NATO's International Military Staff. The Intelligence Division provides day-to-day strategic intelligence support to the Secretary General; it has no intelligence gathering capacity of its own and therefore relies on input from alliance members. On this basis it could be described as a "central coordinating body" for the collation, assessment, and dissemination of intelligence within NATO Headquarters. He retired on 29 December 2007.

Over the course of his naval career, he attended the Advanced Command and Staff Course and the Higher Command and Staff Course.

External image
- Clayton in 2006 (far right)

== See also ==
- Photo of Clayton during the Falklands War
