= HMS Cardiff (D108) =

Type 42 destroyer

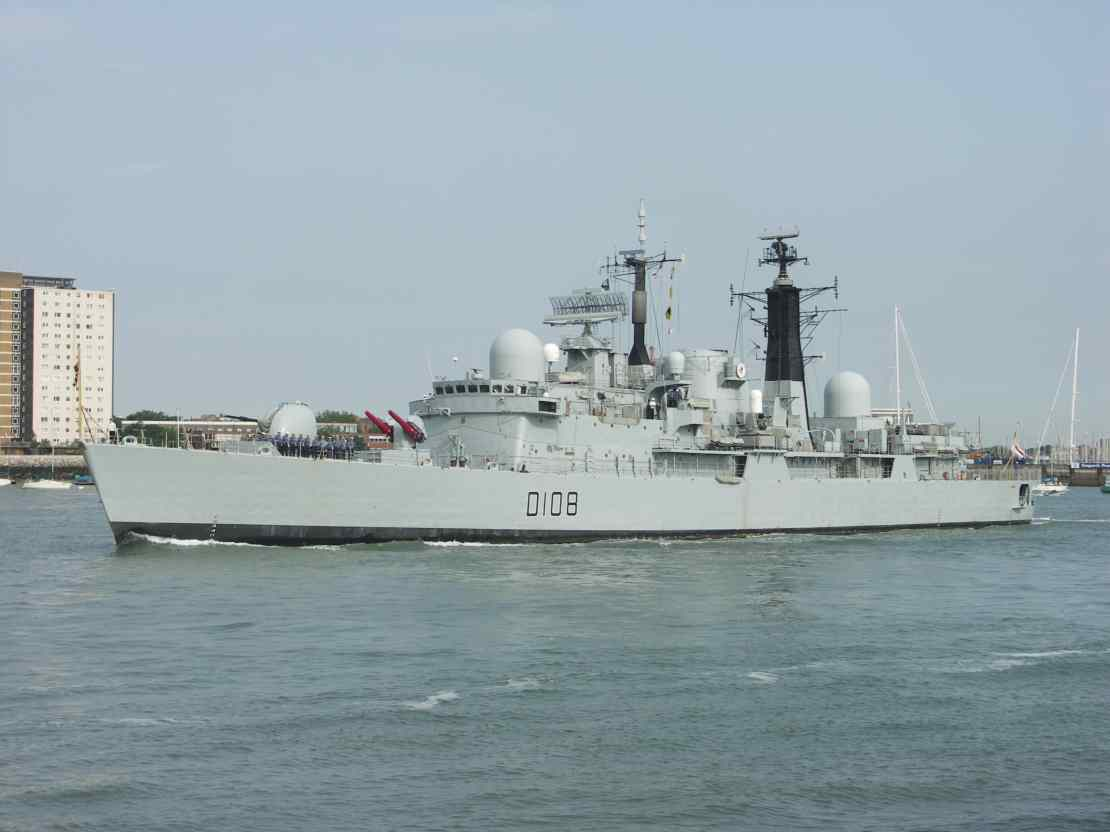
- HMS Cardiff in Portsmouth, c. 2005

History

United Kingdom
- Name: HMS Cardiff
- Namesake: Welsh capital city of Cardiff
- Builder: Vickers Shipbuilding and Engineering
- Laid down: 6 November 1972
- Launched: 22 February 1974
- Commissioned: 24 September 1979
- Decommissioned: 14 July 2005
- Home port: HMNB Portsmouth
- Identification: Pennant number: D108; Deck code: CF; IMO number: 4907024
- Motto: Acris in cardine rerum (Latin); ('Keen in emergency')
- Nickname(s): "The Welsh Warship"
- Honours and awards: 2 × battle honours: Falkland Islands 1982; Kuwait 1991; Freedom of the City of Cardiff
- Fate: Scrapped 2008
- Badge

General characteristics
- Class & type: Type 42 destroyer
- Displacement: 4,000 t (3,900 long tons; 4,400 short tons)
- Length: 125 m (410 ft)
- Beam: 14.3 m (47 ft)
- Draught: 5.8 m (19 ft)
- Propulsion: 2 × COGOG turbines producing 36 MW (48,000 shp), driving 2 shafts
- Speed: 56 km/h (30 kn)
- Range: 7,400 km (4,000 nmi) at 33 km/h (18 kn)
- Complement: 287–301
- Electronic warfare & decoys: UAA1
- Armament: 1 × Twin Sea Dart missile launcher; 1 × 4.5 inch (113 mm) Mk.8 gun; 2 × 20 mm Oerlikon guns; 2 × Phalanx close-in weapon system; 2 × Triple anti-submarine torpedo tubes; NATO Seagnat and DLF3 decoy launchers
- Aircraft carried: Lynx HAS.3

HMS Cardiff was a British Type 42 destroyer and the third ship of the Royal Navy to be named in honour of the Welsh capital city of Cardiff.

Cardiff served in the Falklands War, where she was involved in the 1982 British Army Gazelle friendly fire incident. She also shot down the last Argentine aircraft of the conflict and accepted the surrender of a 700-strong garrison in the settlement of Port Howard.

During the 1991 Gulf War, her Lynx helicopter sank two Iraqi minesweepers. She later participated in the build-up to the 2003 invasion of Iraq as part of the Royal Navy's constant Armilla patrol, but was not involved in the actual invasion.

Cardiff was decommissioned in July 2005, and sent for scrapping despite calls by former servicemen for her to be preserved as a museum ship and local tourist attraction in Cardiff.

== Construction ==
The Type 42 destroyers, also known as the Sheffield class, were built in three batches; Cardiff was built in the first. The cost of the warships construction was over £30 million, which was double her original quoted price. The keel was laid down on 6 November 1972, at Vickers Shipbuilding and Engineering Ltd in Barrow-in-Furness, Cumbria. The build was interrupted by a labour shortage at Vickers. To solve this problem, the unfinished hull was towed to Swan Hunter's Hawthorn Leslie yard in Hebburn, Tyne and Wear and completed there.

Type 42s were designed as anti-aircraft vessels primarily equipped with the Sea Dart, a surface-to-air missile system capable of hitting targets up to 56 kilometres (30 nmi) away. Cardiff's secondary weapon system was a 4.5 inch Mark 8 naval gun, capable of firing 21-kilogram (46 lb) shells to a range of 22 kilometres (12 nmi). After the Falklands War, in which two Type 42s were sunk by enemy aircraft, the entire class was equipped with the Phalanx close-in weapon system, a Gatling cannon that could fire 3,000 rounds per minute and was designed to shoot down anti-ship missiles.

== Operational history ==
=== Early career ===
Cardiff was launched on 22 February 1974 by Lady Caroline Gilmour. Following fitting-out and sea trials, Cardiff commissioned on 24 September 1979 under command of Captain Barry Wilson. During the next 12 months of active service she steamed over 21,000 kilometres (13,000 mi) and undertook various duties. She returned to her place of construction, Tyne and Wear, so that the Swan Hunter crew who fitted her out could exhibit the warship to their families. In the spirit of establishing a firm association, Cardiff visited her namesake city and welcomed more than 7,000 people on board. Her crew raised over £1,000 for local charities by participating in sponsored bicycle rides and dinghy rows from Portsmouth and Newcastle upon Tyne. BBC Radio Wales based an entire programme on her and she appeared on the BBC and ITV national television channels. In November 1979, Cardiff coordinated the search for survivors of the MV Pool Fisher, which sank off the Isle of Wight with the loss of most of her crew.

In 1980, she attended the annual Navy Days event at Portsmouth and Portland Harbour, receiving a total of 17,300 visitors. In October of the same year, she ventured abroad for the first time on a visit to Ghent, Belgium. She followed this with a fortnight of Sea Dart exercises on a range off Aberporth, in South Wales. Whilst in the region, the destroyer attended celebrations marking the 75th anniversary of Cardiff's city status.

=== Falklands War (1982) ===
On 2 April 1982, the disputed British overseas territory of the Falkland Islands was invaded by neighbouring Argentina. The United Kingdom, nearly 13,000 kilometres (8,000 mi) away, assembled and dispatched a naval task force of 28,000 troops to recapture the islands. The conflict ended that June with the surrender of the Argentine forces; the battles fought on land, at sea, and in the air had cost the lives of some 900 British and Argentine servicemen.

Just over a month before the start of the war, Cardiff, under the command of Captain Michael Harris, had begun a six-month deployment to the Persian Gulf with the Armilla Patrol. Cardiff had relieved her sister ship and class lead Sheffield from this operational tasking, but was herself redeployed to the Falklands effort on 23 April. She sailed alone to Gibraltar and rendezvoused on 14 May with the Bristol group of British warships already heading south to the islands.

During the journey, Cardiff's crew performed various training exercises, including defence against air attack (involving simulation runs by friendly Harrier and Jaguar aircraft), nuclear, biological, and chemical weapons and Exocet anti-ship missiles. All British Type 42's involved in the war were instructed to paint two vertical black stripes down either side of the middle of their ships. This would allow the Royal Navy submarines to distinguish them from the two Argentine Type 42's. On 22 May, an Argentine reconnaissance Boeing 707, no. TC-92 of the Argentine Air Force's Grupo 1, De Transporte Aereo Escuadron II (Spanish for "2nd Air Transport Squadron, Group 1"), was fired on by Cardiff. The aircraft was detected while shadowing the Bristol group, and Cardiff was ordered to drop back and engage. The ship fired two Sea Darts at the aircraft at 11:40 (local time) from maximum range; the first fell short and second missed due to evasive manoeuvres taken by the aircraft's crew. After the attack, TC-92 dropped below radar level and returned to El Palomar. On 25 May, Cardiff was tasked with the recovery of four Special Air Service (SAS) troopers, who had parachuted from a C-130 Hercules passing over the destroyer.

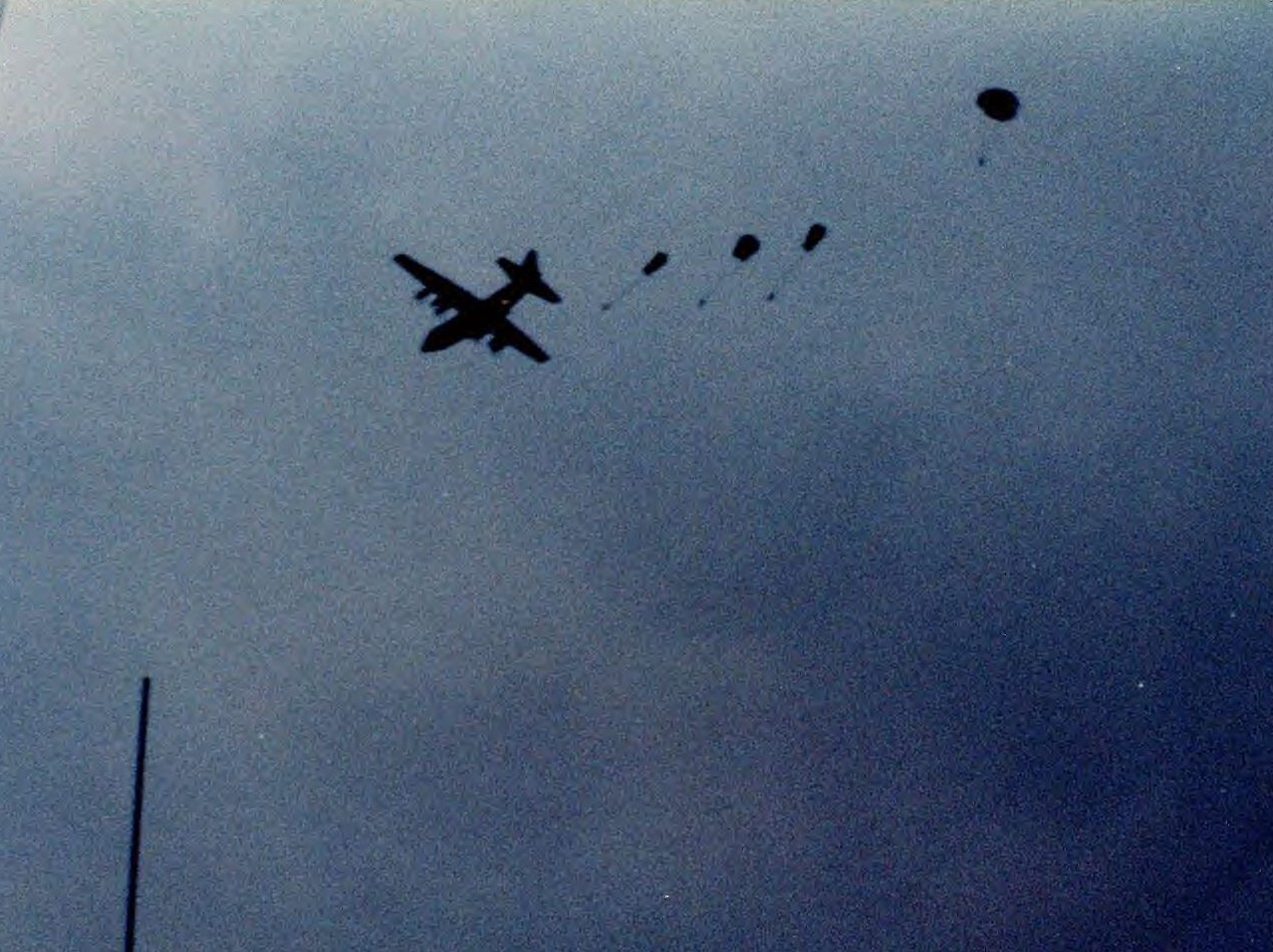
Four SAS troopers rendezvous with Cardiff via airdrop, en route to the islands

The Bristol group met up with the main task force on 26 May. Cardiff's arrival allowed the damaged Glasgow to return to the United Kingdom for repairs. Cardiff's primary role was to form part of the anti-aircraft warfare picket, protecting British ships from air attack and attempting to ambush Argentine aircraft that were re-supplying Port Stanley Airport. She was also required to fire at enemy positions on the islands with her 4.5-inch gun. In one engagement she fired 277 high-explosive rounds.

Friendly fire incident

In the early hours of 6 June, Cardiff shot down a friendly Army Air Corps Gazelle helicopter (no. XX377 of 656 Squadron), in the belief it was a low flying enemy C-130 Hercules. All four on board were killed, the factors contributing to the accident were a poor level of communication between the army and navy, and the helicopter's "Identification Friend or Foe" transmitter had been turned off due to it interfering with other equipment. However a board of inquiry recommended that neither negligence nor blame should be attributed to any individual and that no action should be taken against any individual. The number "205" was later painted at the crash site (51.783600°S 58.467786°W) as a memorial, the significance being that two of the helicopter's passengers were from 205 Signal Squadron.

Approximately an hour after the Gazelle shoot-down, Cardiff spotted four landing craft carrying troops from the 2nd Battalion, Scots Guards. Having been told there were no British forces in the area, Cardiff's crew assumed they were Argentine and fired star shells in preparation for an attack. When the Guards saw the star shells and realised Cardiff's intentions, the officer in charge, Major Ewen Southby-Tailyour, moved them into shallow water. Cardiff, still closing on the craft, signalled the single word "friend" via Aldis lamp. Southby-Tailyour replied, "to which side". At this point, Cardiff broke off, avoiding a second Friendly fire incident.

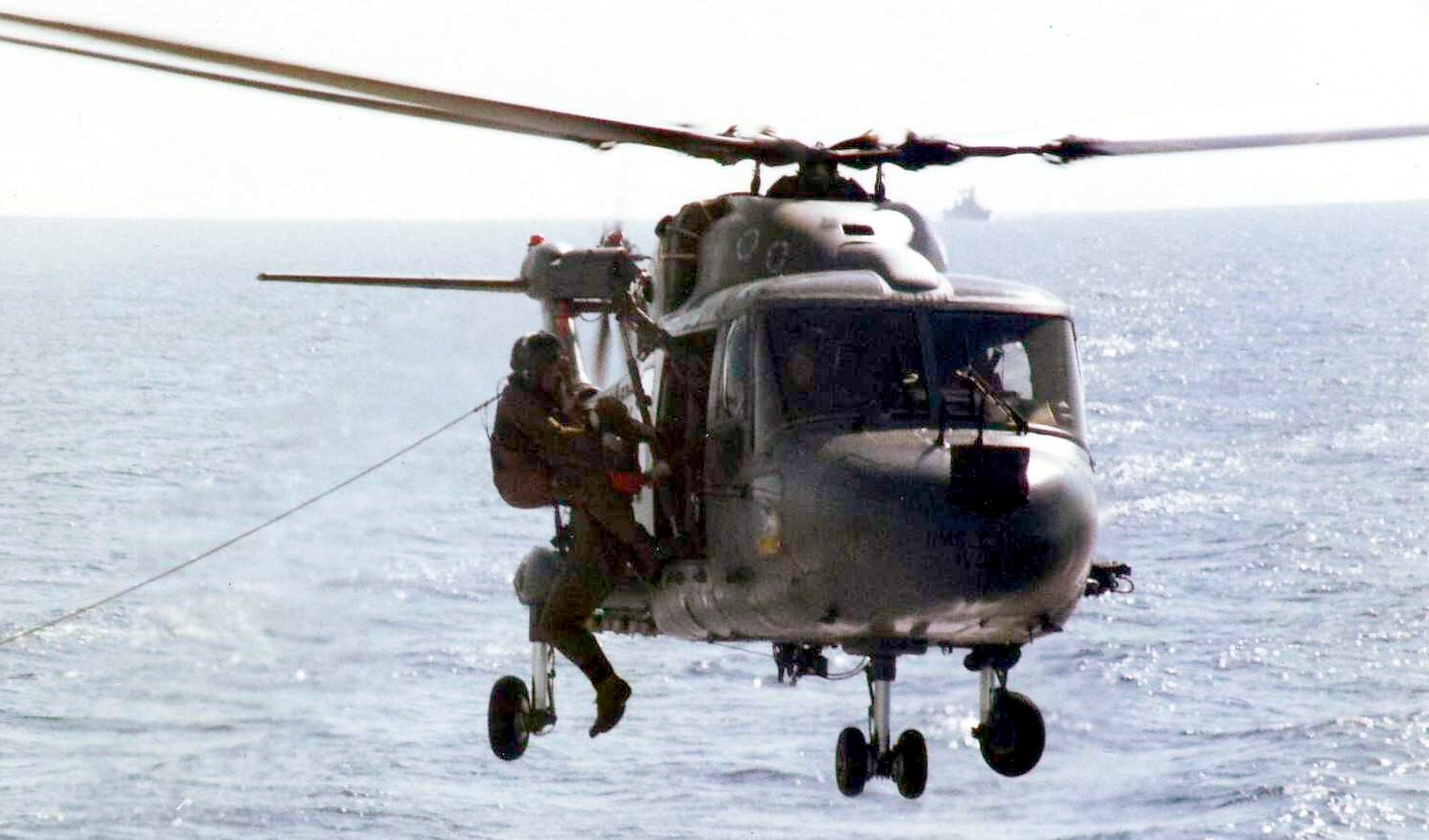
Cardiff's helicopter, piloted by Lieutenant Christopher Clayton, practising search and rescue prior to the war

On the morning of 13 June, two Argentine Dagger aircraft attacked Cardiff's Lynx helicopter, (ZF558) of 829 NAS, while it was searching in the Falkland Sound area. Poor weather had forced the Argentine craft to abandon their original mission of bombing Mount Longdon, and the third Dagger of their formation had suffered a mechanical failure and returned to base. The Lynx began evasive manoeuvres and dodged the attacks; the pilot, Lieutenant Christopher Clayton, was mentioned in despatches for his efforts.

Argentina surrendered on 14 June, and Cardiff was required to accept the surrender of a 700-strong Argentine garrison in the settlement of Port Howard on West Falkland a day later. Five members of Cardiff's crew were used to man a captured Argentine patrol boat, renamed HMS Tiger Bay, in Stanley. Cardiff spent the rest of June acting as the Landing Area Air Warfare Controller (LAAWC) around San Carlos.

Over the course of the war, Cardiff fired nine Sea Dart missiles and one Mk 46 torpedo. She returned to the United Kingdom on 28 July 1982, having left the Falklands three weeks earlier along with Exeter and Yarmouth. Captain Michael Harris handed over command on 24 August 1982, after the annual maintenance period. Following the war, all Type 42 destroyers were fitted with Oerlikon 30 mm twin cannons port and starboard, for protection against airborne threats. These were later replaced by the Phalanx close-in weapon system.

=== Gulf War (1990–91) ===
When Saddam Hussein's Iraq invaded Kuwait on 2 August 1990, British Secretary of State for Defence Tom King soon announced that the UK military contribution to the region was to be increased. A coalition of nations was formed, and a combined naval force entered the Persian Gulf and sailed north, neutralising the Iraqi Navy as it went, and then began conducting naval gunfire support and mine counter-measure missions in preparation for the main amphibious landing force.

Having returned from the Persian Gulf in May 1990, after only a few months in UK Cardiff sailed again, as a reinforcement to Group X-Ray, Brazen, London and Gloucester who had sailed to relieve Armilla Group Whiskey, which consisted of Battleaxe, Jupiter and York. Cardiff and Gloucester were to form part of the air defence barrier along with Bunker Hill, Princeton and Worden protecting three United States aircraft carriers: Midway, Ranger and Theodore Roosevelt. Cardiff had other responsibilities, including surface surveillance and boarding operations, to maintain the security around the task force.

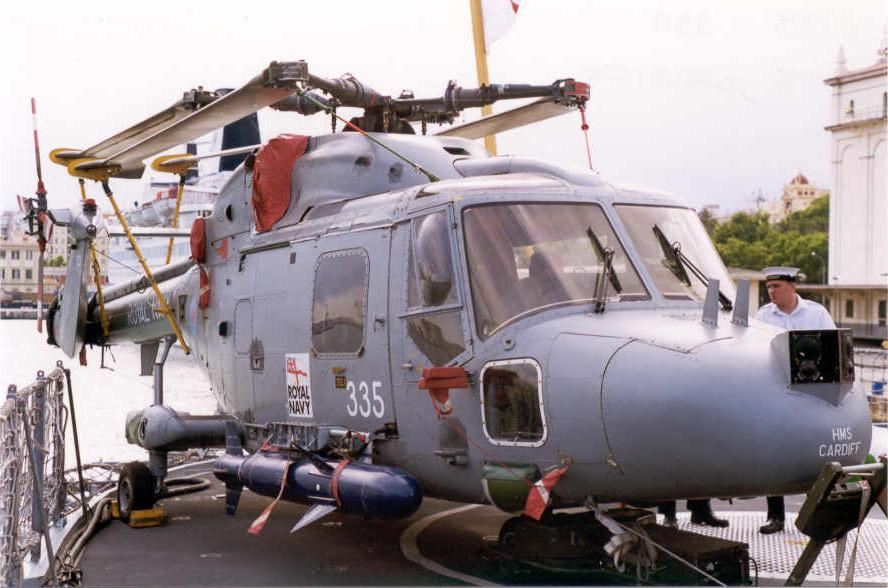
Cardiff's Lynx helicopter, with a Sea Skua missile

Royal Navy Lynxes operated in combination with United States Seahawks during the Gulf War. The American helicopters lacked an effective anti-ship missile but had superior surveillance capability compared to the British aircraft. Seahawks would locate hostile vessels for the Lynxes, which would then engage with Sea Skua missiles. In total, Lynx helicopters flew nearly 600 sorties during the conflict, while crews and engineers maintained flying rates three times their normal level.

Despite her parent ship avoiding mines and maintaining the air defence line as the closest non-United States warship to Kuwait during the first four weeks of the 1991 Gulf War, Cardiff's Lynx (ZF558) of 815 NAS undertook most of her combat operations in the conflict. On 24 January 1991, her Lynx located Iraqi minesweepers and landing craft moving to support Iraqi forces during the Battle of Khafji, sinking one in the first successful British naval action of the war. Later that day, coalition forces captured Qaruh Island, the first Kuwaiti territory to be liberated.

On the night of 30–31 January, operating with Lynxes from Gloucester and Brazen, ZF558 attacked Iraqi missile-armed fast patrol boats leaving the Shatt al-Arab. In February, ZF558 sank two more Iraqi vessels just before she and Brazen were relieved by Group Yankee, comprising Brave, Brilliant, Exeter and Manchester.

=== Post Gulf War ===
After the Gulf War, Cardiff's assignments included a deployment with the Standing Naval Force Mediterranean, a post Cold War NATO immediate reaction force in the Mediterranean, and counter-narcotics patrols in the West Indies, during which she also assisted with relief tasks on the island of Eleuthera in the wake of Hurricane Andrew. From 1993 to 1994, she was commanded by Richard Leaman.

Cardiff later returned to the Persian Gulf for seven months.

On 14 October 1994, in response to renewed Iraqi deployment of troops near the Kuwaiti border, the US-led Operation Vigilant Warrior began. The operation was designed to deter Saddam Hussein's "sabre-rattling" by sending large amounts of allied military forces to Kuwait; Cornwall and Cardiff were the UK contribution. The operation ended on 21 December 1994, when Hussein pulled back his forces.

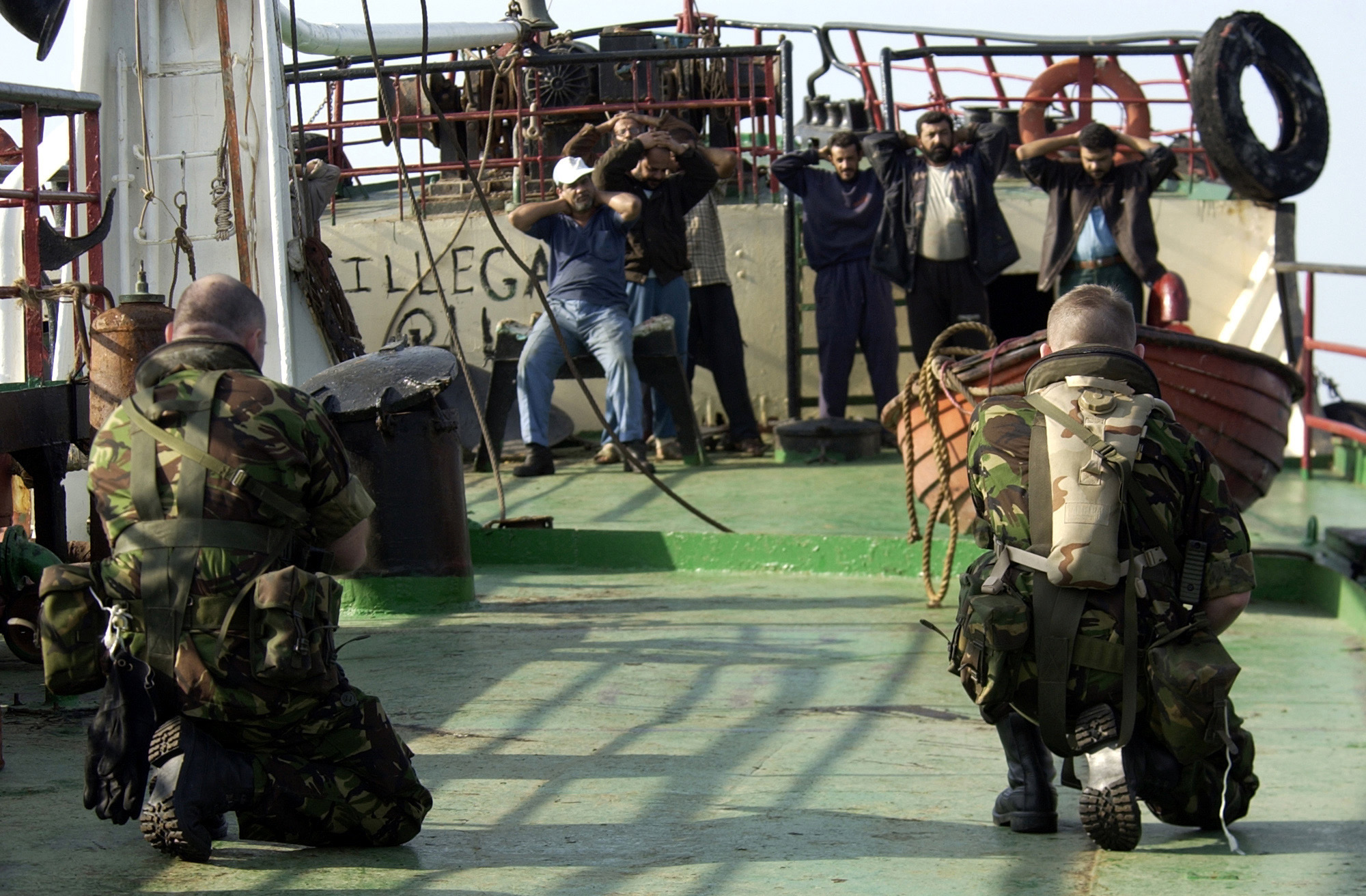
Personnel from Cardiff guard the crew of an Iraqi oil tanker during her last Armilla Patrol, in late 2002.

Upon her return to the UK from Operation Vigilant Warrior, Cardiff participated in the 1995 NATO exercise "Strong Resolve", a training exercise conducted every four years in dual crisis management. The ship next underwent Operational Sea Training (OST) at Portland, in preparation for assuming the duty of Fleet Ready Escort, which required a ship to be available to deploy anywhere in the world at short notice. After completing OST, she attended the 50th VE Day anniversary in Copenhagen and Oslo and provided navigational sea training for frigate and destroyer navigating officer candidates. A visit to her namesake city of Cardiff for VJ Day celebrations followed, after which she sailed to Plymouth for a trials and weapon training programme. She then took part in Operation Bright Star, a multi-national exercise conducted every two years in Egypt. In November, Cardiff became the first Royal Navy ship to enter the Lebanese capital of Beirut in 27 years, spurring the creation of the Beirut Phoenicians Rugby Club, followed by visits to Tunisia and Gibraltar.

In 2000, as part of the Royal Navy's Atlantic Patrol Task North, Cardiff spent six months in the Caribbean with RFA Black Rover. They provided relief aid to the island of Caye Caulker, near Belize, in the wake of Hurricane Keith. In addition to clearing routes, distributing supplies, and making buildings and electrical cables safe, Cardiff's surgeon and medical team monitored sanitation. In October, they also took part in the NATO exercise "Unified Spirit", held off the east coast of the United States. "Unified Spirit" is a training exercise conducted every four years in NATO-led "out-of-area" UN peace support operations. In the same year she participated in the US Navy Fleet Battle Exercise after her combat system was integrated into the Digital Fires Network.

Cardiff conducted her last Armilla patrol in early 2003. During her time in the Persian Gulf, Cardiff prevented more than £2 million of illegal cargo from being smuggled out of Iraq, inspected 178 vessels, and seized more than 25,000 tonnes of oil. The destroyer was relieved by Richmond before the beginning of the Iraq War and returned to Portsmouth on 4 April 2003. In late 2003, the ship was involved in the annual Sea Days demonstration exercise, and in October was used for tests of QinetiQ's Maritime Tactical Network.

In 2005, she participated in the Trafalgar 200 International Fleet Review, just two weeks before she was decommissioned. In this post Gulf War period, the Royal Navy's first female chaplain also served on board.

== Decommissioning and fate ==
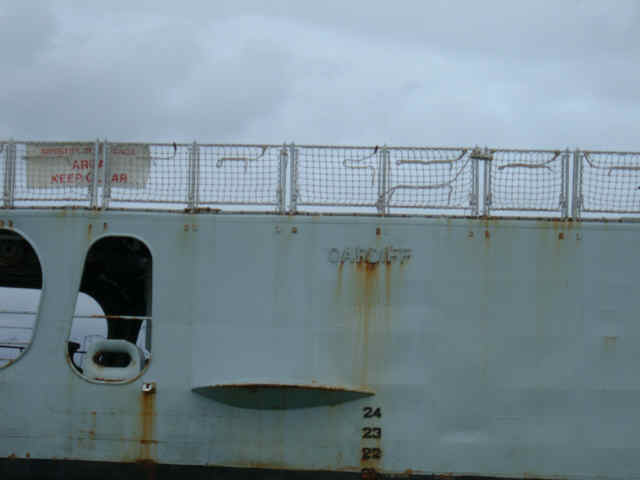
Cardiff's starboard quarter (stern) in 2007, her name rusted

Cardiff was originally to be replaced in 2009 by Daring, the first of the Royal Navy's next generation Type 45 destroyers. However, it was announced in July 2004 that she would be one of a number of ships withdrawn from service early, in accordance with the "Delivering Security in a Changing World" white paper on the British military.

Cardiff was decommissioned on 14 July 2005, after making a final visit to her namesake city, where members of the public were allowed on board. She then stayed in Portsmouth Harbour at Fareham Creek (50.818486°N 1.130644°W) alongside sister ship Newcastle, where both were heavily cannibalised to keep the remaining Type 42 Destroyers running.

On 21 November 2008, the two ships left Portsmouth for the last time for Aliağa, Turkey under tow for scrapping. Following a decommissioning ceremony at Cardiff City Hall, her bell was removed and is now mounted in the north aisle of St John's Parish Church in Cardiff. Calls were made for the conversion of the ship into a Cardiff tourist attraction by a Member of the National Assembly for Wales and former naval servicemen.

Dragon, a Type 45 destroyer, has been assigned as the current Royal Navy ship to be affiliated with the city of Cardiff.

On 1 March 2018, Defence Secretary Gavin Williamson announced that the third Type 26 frigate would be named Cardiff. This will be the fourth Royal Navy vessel of its name.

== See also ==
- British naval forces in the Falklands War
- 1982 British Army Gazelle friendly fire incident
