= MV Pool Fisher =

British merchant vessel that sank off the Isle of Wight

History

United Kingdom
- Name: Pool Fisher
- Owner: James Fisher & Sons
- Port of registry: Barrow-in-Furness
- Launched: 1959
- Identification: IMO number: 5282029
- Fate: Sank, 6 November 1979

General characteristics
- Type: General cargo ship
- Tonnage: 1,028.19 GRT
- Length: 208 ft (63 m)
- Beam: 33 ft 5 in (10.19 m)
- Propulsion: 1 × 830 bhp (619 kW) Deutz marine diesel engine; 1 shaft
- Speed: 11 knots (20 km/h; 13 mph)
- Crew: 15

MV Pool Fisher was a British merchant vessel that sank off the Isle of Wight on 6 November 1979 with the loss of most of her crew.

== Service history ==
Pool Fisher was built in Holland and launched in 1959.

=== Loss ===
On 3 November 1979 Pool Fisher arrived at Hamburg from Norway in ballast. She had a crew of 15, and one passenger, the wife of the Chief Engineer, aboard. At about 13:00 the same day she sailed from Hamburg carrying 1,250 tonnes of muriate of potash in bulk, bound for Runcorn.

At 22:50 on 5 November the Esso Penzance sighted Pool Fisher about eleven miles south of Brighton, steering erratically and seemingly down by the head, in heavy seas. At 05:47 on 6 November the coast radio station at Niton received a Mayday call from Pool Fisher. Within minutes Niton passed the information to the coastguard, which immediately alerted the Yarmouth and Bembridge lifeboats and scrambled SAR helicopters from Lee-on-Solent, and later from Portland and Culdrose. The search and rescue operation was carried out, in severe weather conditions, by three Royal Navy warships, including HMS Cardiff, six merchant vessels and two lifeboats, assisted by four helicopters.

The only two survivors from Pool Fisher, were both off-watch and asleep below when they were roused by the bosun and ordered on deck. By the time they arrived there the ship was listing heavily to port, and both were washed off the deck by heavy seas. They were finally rescued by helicopters of the Fleet Air Arm after spending over five hours holding on to cargo hatch boards from the sunken ship. Both were suffering from severe hypothermia and were taken to Haslar Naval Hospital for treatment.

The wreck of Pool Fisher was later located in a position 6.6 miles (10.6 km) off St. Catherine's Point, bearing 232°.

The court of inquiry concluded that her sinking was due to the failure of the No.1 hatch, which had only three hatch locking wires fitted, instead the eight required, and some of her securing cleats were defective. This allowed the rapid entry of a large quantity of water into the hold, first putting her down by the head and then causing her to list, and then capsize. Responsibility for this failure was placed on her Master, John Maclaren Stewart, and the Mate, Francis William Cooper, neither of whom survived.
