= Pleasant Peak =

Mountain in the Falkland Islands

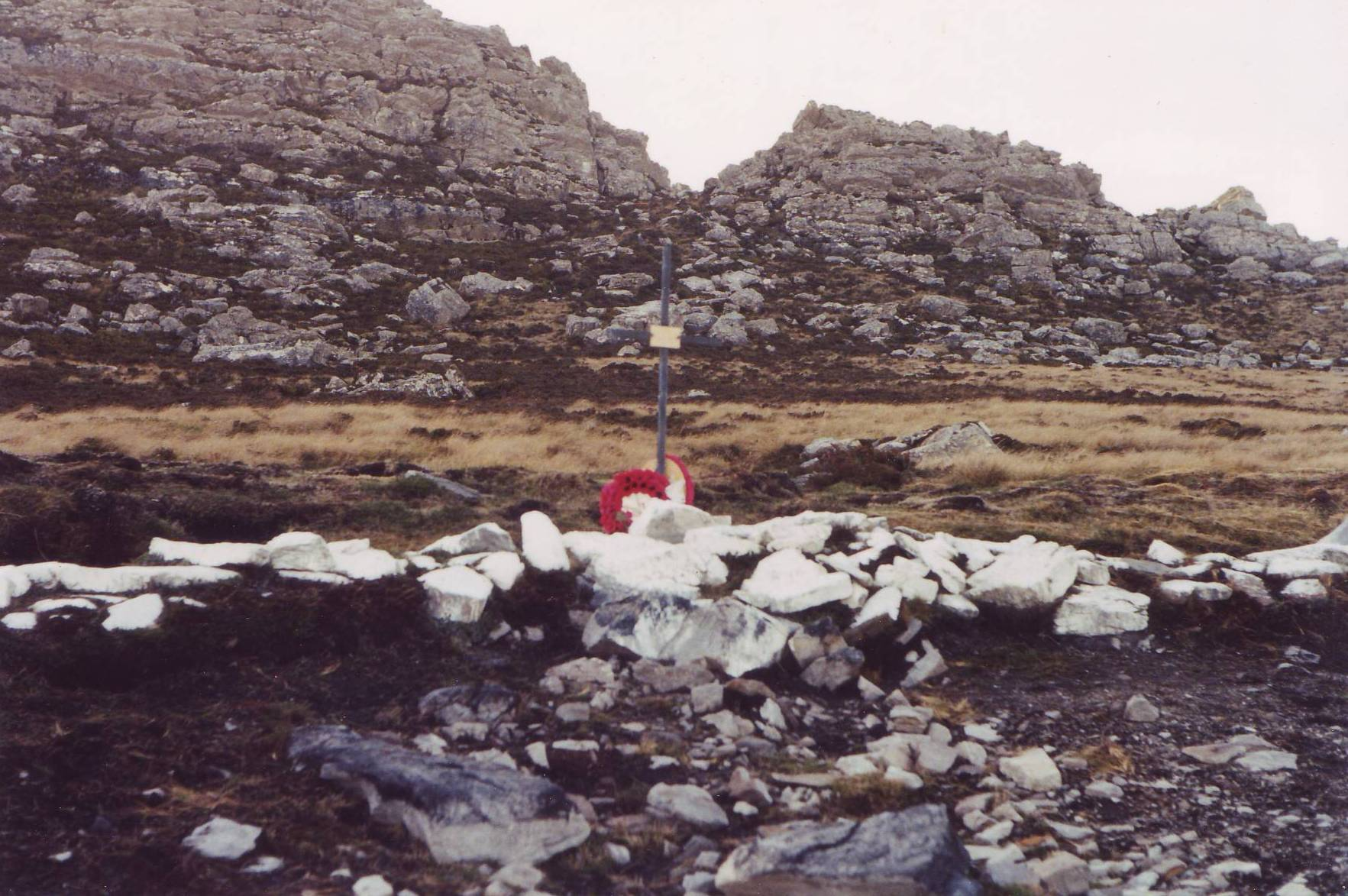
- The memorial on Pleasant Peak

Highest point
- Coordinates: 51°46′55.85″S 58°28′22.13″W

Geography
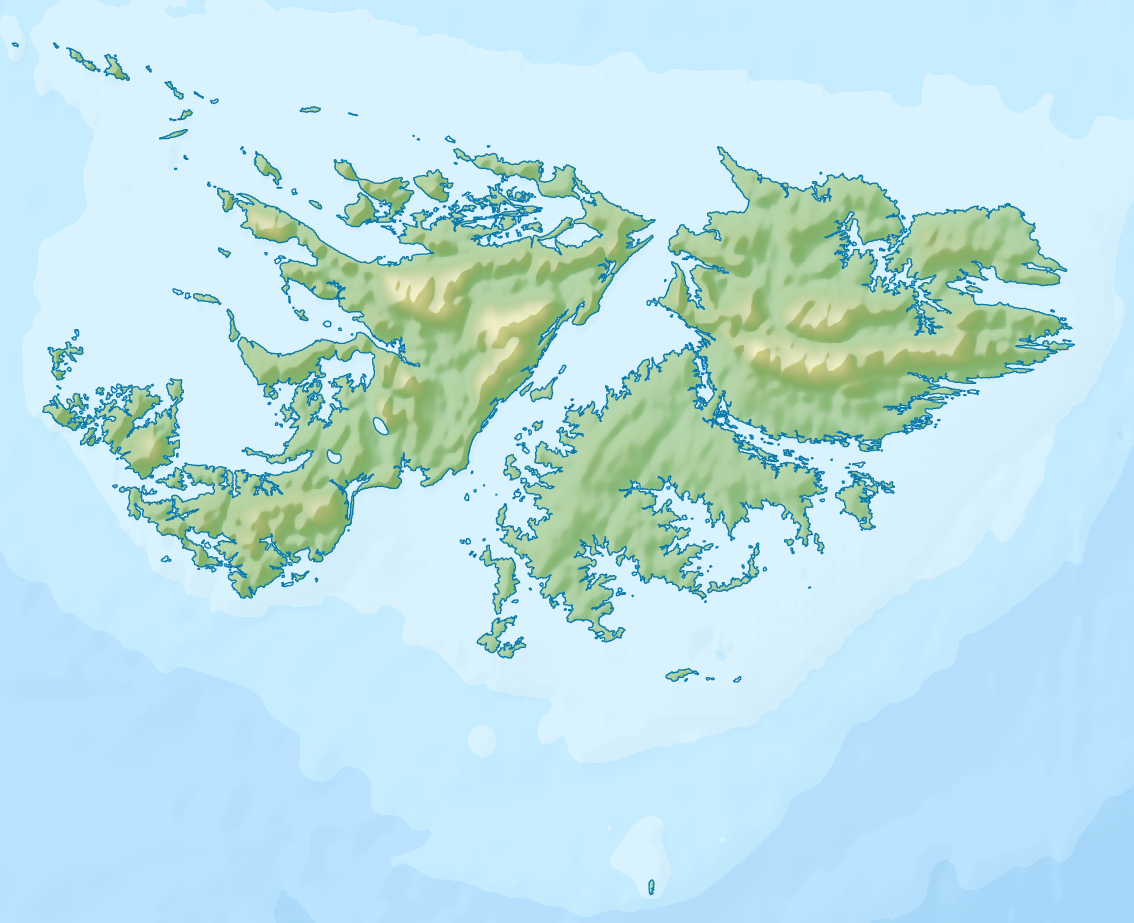
- Location within Falkland Islands
- Location: East Falkland, Falkland Islands, south Atlantic Ocean

Pleasant Peak is a location on the Falkland Islands, East Falkland, two miles (3.2 km) north of RAF Mount Pleasant.

== History ==
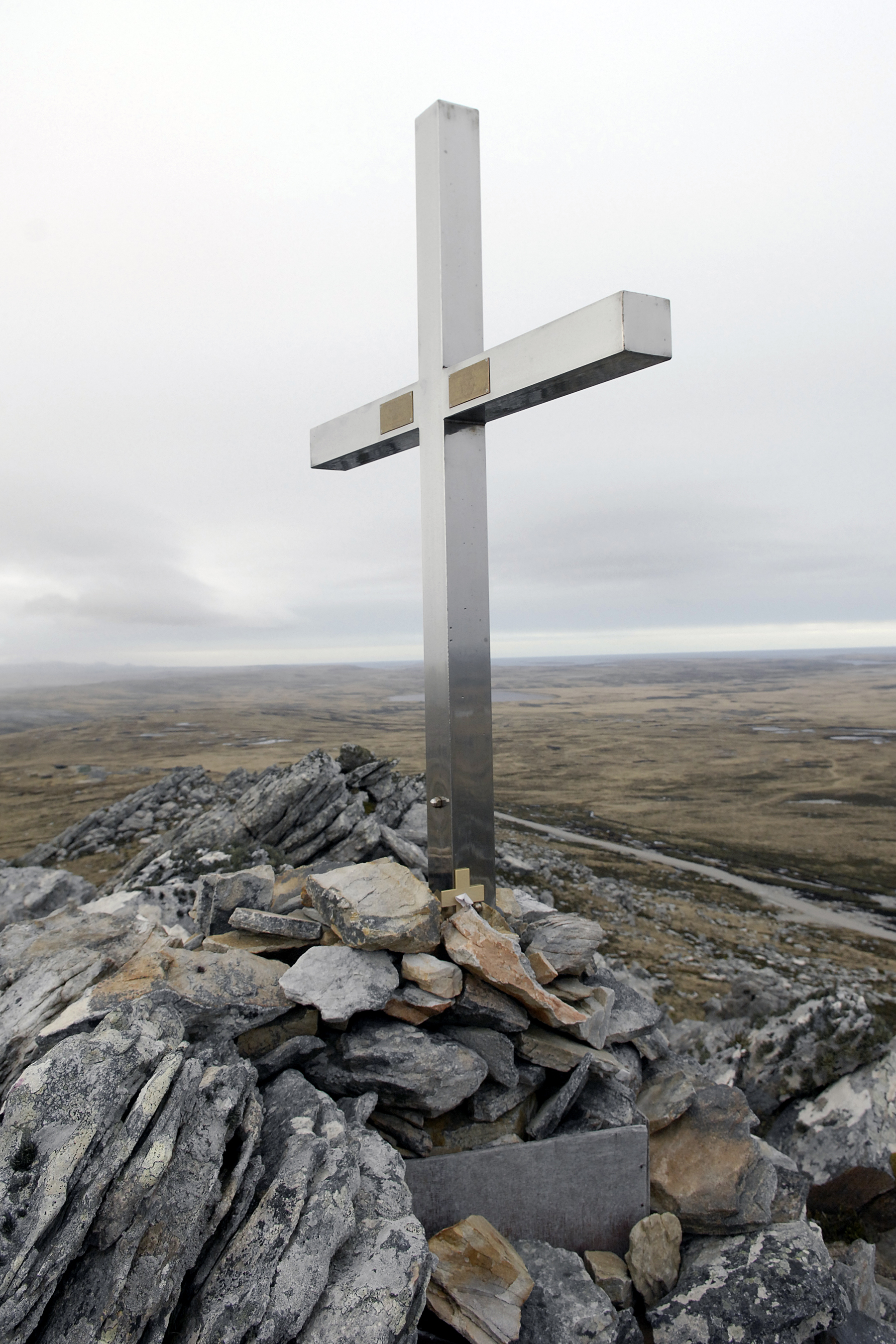
Cross at Pleasant Peak on East Falkland

The mountain was the site of the 1982 British Army Gazelle friendly fire incident when HMS Cardiff shot down a British Army Gazelle helicopter, killing its four occupants.

When the adjacent Mount Pleasant Complex was being constructed in the aftermath of the Falkland conflict, a quarry was opened up on the lower slopes of Pleasant Peak to supply hard rock (quartzite) for the construction of the foundations and a base for the runway.
