= HMS Chatham (F87) =

1990 Type 22 or Broadsword class frigate of the Royal Navy

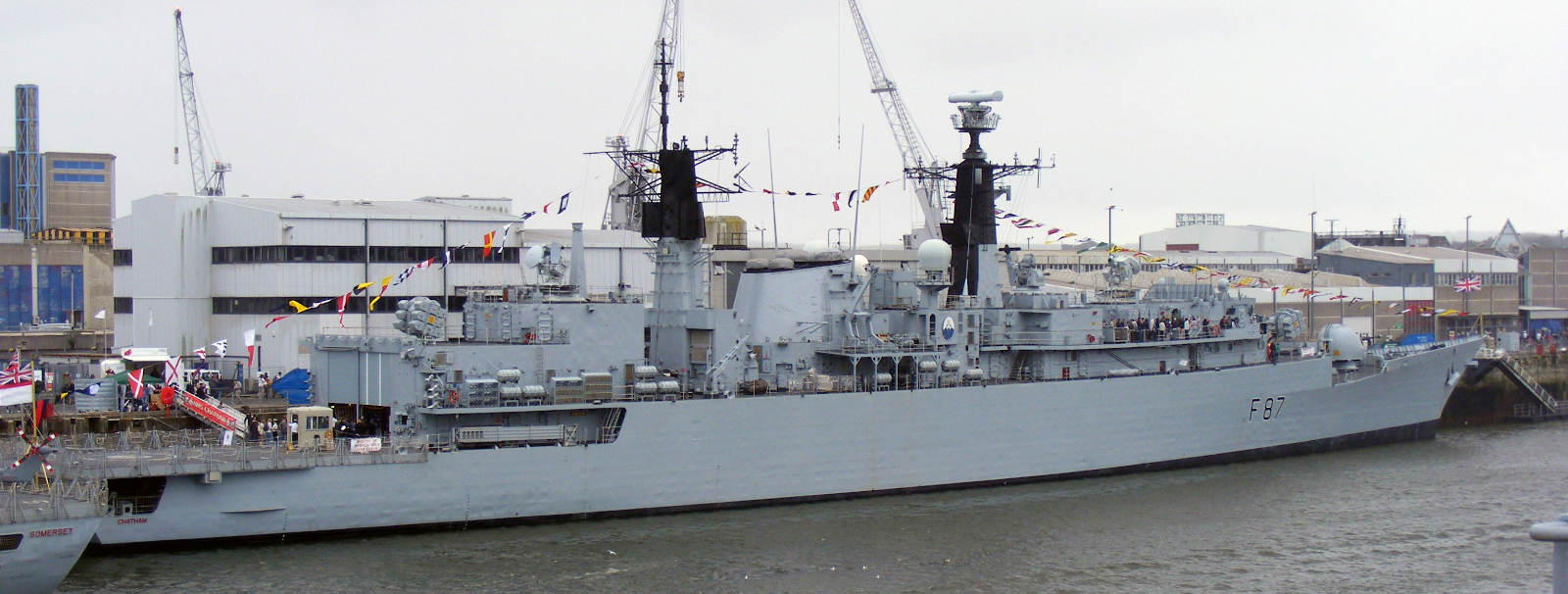
- HMS Chatham in harbour, 2010

History

United Kingdom
- Name: Chatham
- Builder: Swan Hunter, Newcastle, England
- Laid down: 12 May 1986
- Launched: 20 January 1988
- Sponsored by: Lady Oswald
- Commissioned: 4 May 1990
- Decommissioned: 8 February 2011
- Home port: HMNB Devonport, Plymouth
- Identification: Pennant number: F87; IMO number: 4907141; International callsign: GABL
- Motto: "Up and at 'em"; Latin: Surge et vince
- Fate: Scrapped October 2013
- Badge

General characteristics
- Class & type: Type 22 frigate
- Displacement: 5,300 tons
- Length: 148.1 m (485 ft 11 in)
- Beam: 14.8 m (48 ft 7 in)
- Draught: 6.4 m (21 ft 0 in)
- Propulsion: 2 × Rolls-Royce Marine Spey gas turbines (high speed); 2 × Rolls-Royce Tyne gas turbines (cruising); 2 shafts driving variable-pitch propellers with COGAG (Combined gas and gas) gearbox, allowing all four engines to provide power to the drive train.
- Speed: 30 knots (56 km/h; 35 mph) (max)
- Complement: 250 (max. 301)
- Armament: 2 × Sea Wolf anti-air system (Total of 72 Sea Wolf missiles); 2 × Quad Harpoon missile launchers (total of 8 Harpoons); 2 × triple Magazine launched anti-submarine torpedo tubes (total of 36 torpedoes); 1 × 4.5-inch (114 mm) Mk.8 gun; 2 × 20 mm GAM-BO1 guns; 1 × Goalkeeper CIWS; NATO Seagnat decoy launchers
- Aircraft carried: 2 x Lynx Mk.8 helicopters (but only 1 Lynx in peace time).; Armed with; 4 × Sea Skua anti-ships missiles; 2 × Sting Ray anti-submarine torpedoes; 2 × Mk 11 depth charges; 2 × machine guns

HMS Chatham was a Batch 3 Type 22 frigate of the British Royal Navy. She was decommissioned on 8 February 2011.

Chatham had the rare honour of a motto in English; Up and at 'em, being the rallying cry of the Medway town football and rugby teams. The motto has subsequently been translated back into Latin as Surge et vince.

== Operational history ==
=== 1990–1999 ===
Chatham joined Operation Sharp Guard to enforce the embargo against the former Yugoslavia in 1993. Her most notable action was on 1 May 1994 and the capture of the Maltese freighter Lido II, which was suspected of smuggling fuel to Montenegro. The British frigate assisted the Dutch frigate HNLMS Van Kinsbergen, who had forced the merchant to stop.

Three Yugoslav Končar-class missile boats challenged the NATO operation and one of them attempted to ram Chatham. The corvettes were driven off by the actions of the British warship, supported by Italian Tornado aircraft which scrambled from an airbase at Gioia Del Colle. Lido II underwent repairs after sabotage to the ship's engine room by her crew, before being diverted to Italy. The leaking was contained by an engineering party from Chatham. Seven Yugoslav stowaways were found on board.

Under the command of Captain Christopher Clayton, she was guardship to the royal yacht HMY Britannia during the withdrawal from Hong Kong in 1997 (and served as the control military operations in the months prior to the handover).

=== 2000–2009 ===
In May 2000, Chatham was part of the Amphibious Ready Group (ARG) sent to the coast of Sierra Leone to oversee the evacuation of British, EU and Commonwealth nationals as part of Operation Palliser, under the captaincy of George Zambellas.

In March 2003, Chatham became the first British warship to fire her guns in anger since the Falklands War, when, as part of Operation Telic, she engaged targets on the Al-Faw Peninsula of southern Iraq. Approximately 60 rounds were fired at a variety of targets from her 4.5-inch gun. In company with HMS Marlborough, HMS Richmond and HMAS Anzac she remained on station for the following 72 hours at immediate readiness to provide fire support to the troops of the Royal Marines as they advanced up the peninsula.

Chatham deployed from the UK to the Persian Gulf in January and returned in August. During the deployment, in the run-up to and the conduct of the invasion of Iraq, the ship spent around 90 days at sea continuously at defence watches in the northern part of the Persian Gulf. At times she came very close to hitting mines laid by Iraqi dhows and tugs in the shallow waters to be found in the area.

Chatham hosted filmmaker Chris Terrill of the BBC for the television programme Shipmates which charted the life of sailors in the Royal Navy. In the program, he filmed Chatham on active service in the Persian Gulf, whilst on an anti-terrorist mission. The show also covered the Chatham's humanitarian relief efforts off the coast of Sri Lanka after the December 2004 Indian Ocean Tsunami.

On 18 April 2005, Chatham sent a party ashore at Alexandria in Egypt to provide a burial for the recently uncovered remains of thirty British sailors and officers who had died during or after the 1798 Battle of the Nile.

On 31 October 2006, she visited the town of Chatham, Massachusetts, on her way to Boston.

In 2008, Chatham was responsible for the capture of six tonnes of the 23-tonne narcotic haul seized by the Royal Navy between January and August 2008. As of March 2010, she was the NATO flagship for international naval operations against Somali piracy.

=== 2010–2011 ===
On 17 May 2010, Chatham destroyed two pirate boats in the Somali Basin, forcing the pirates to return in the mother ship to Somalia.

On 20 May 2010 Cyclone Bandu disabled a cargo vessel, MV Dubai Moon, and left her drifting off the Somali coast. Before the cargo vessel sank, 23 crew members were rescued by helicopters from Chatham.

== Decommissioning and disposal ==
As a result of defence cuts, HMS Chatham arrived in Plymouth for the last time on 27 January 2011. The ship was decommissioned in February 2011. She was stripped of equipment and laid up at Portsmouth and in July 2013 sold to Turkish company Leyal for scrapping.

In autumn 2013, Chatham was towed to the Leyal shipyard in Turkey on her final voyage for breaking.

== Affiliations ==
Chatham was affiliated to a number of military and civil bodies:

Ship's Sponsor: Lady Oswald

- 3 Regiment, Army Air Corps
- Medway Council
- Worshipful Company of Merchant Taylors
- Chatham Dockyard Historic Trust
- Chatham Dockyard Historic Society
- Royal Naval Association, Chatham
- TS Cornwallis (Medway Town Sea Cadet Unit)
- 5th Medway Scouts
- 1404 Chatham Squadron (Air Training Corps)

== Notable commanding officers ==
Almost all the commanders of Chatham subsequently achieved flag rank including James Morse, Ian Forbes, Tony Hogg, Paul Boissier, Christopher Clayton, Martin Connell (Dec 2006 - Jan 2009), Trevor Soar and George Zambellas.
