= Richard Leaman =

Royal Navy Rear Admiral (born 1956)

Rear Admiral Richard Leaman CB OBE
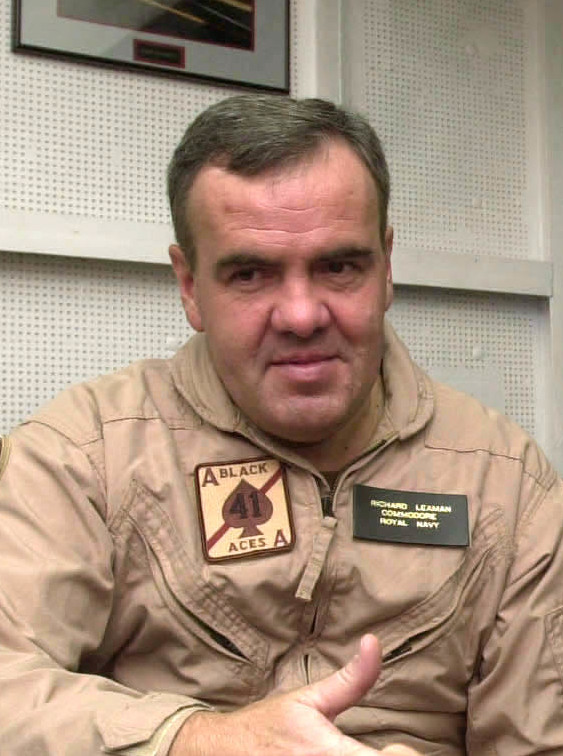
- Leaman in 2003 during a briefing aboard USS Nimitz
- Born: Richard Derek Leaman; 27 July 1956 (age 70); Lynton, Devon, England
- Military career
- Allegiance: United Kingdom
- Branch: Royal Navy
- Service years: 1976–2010
- Rank: Rear admiral
- Commands: HMS Dumbarton Castle; HMS Cardiff; HMS Cumberland; Commander UK Task Group (COMUKTG); Director of the Higher Command and Staff Course
- Other work: CEO of Tall Ships Youth Trust (2017–2021); CEO of The Guide Dogs for the Blind Association (2010–2016)

Rear Admiral Richard Derek Leaman CB OBE (born 27 July 1956) is a British charity executive and former senior Royal Navy officer. Since 2021, he has been Diocesan Secretary and CEO of the Diocese of Bristol. He was previously CEO of The Guide Dogs for the Blind Association (2010 to 2016) and CEO of the Tall Ships Youth Trust (2017 to 2020).

== Early life and education ==
Leaman was born on 29 July 1956 in Lynton, Devon, England, to Derek Alan Leaman and Jean Rita Leaman. He was educated at Torquay Boys' Grammar School, an all-boys state grammar school in Torquay, Devon. Later in life, he studied at Manchester Business School and completed the Advanced Management Achievement Course in 2010.

== Career ==
=== Military career ===
In 1975, Leaman began one years training at the Britannia Royal Naval College. He was commissioned into the Royal Navy in 1976. On 1 January 1980, he was promoted to lieutenant and granted seniority in that rank from 1 March 1979. In 1982, he attended the Principal warfare officer Course and won the Edgerton Gunnery Prize; he was the youngest ever PWO. He was promoted to lieutenant commander on 1 March 1987, to commander in 1991, and to captain in 1996. He commanded the offshore patrol vessel HMS Dumbarton Castle from 1991 to 1992, the Type 42 destroyer HMS Cardiff from 1993 to 1994, and Type 22 frigate HMS Cumberland from 1999 to 2000.

In 2000, having attended the Higher Command and Staff Course, Leaman was promoted to commodore. He served as Director of communications for the Royal Navy from 2000 to 2001, Commander of the UK Maritime Task Group (COMUKTG) from 2002 to 2003, and Director of the Higher Command and Staff Course from 2003 to 2005. After attending the Defence Strategic Leadership Course, he was promoted to rear admiral on 6 September 2005. He served as Chief of staff at the Allied Maritime Command Naples from 2005 to 2007, and as Deputy Chief of Staff at NATO Strategic Command in Norfolk, Virginia, United States from 2007 to 2009.

Leaman officially retired from the Royal Navy on 31 March 2010.

=== Later career ===
In January 2010, Leaman was announced as the next chief executive officer of The Guide Dogs for the Blind Association in succession to Bridget Warr. He took up the position in April 2010. Since 2012, he has also been a trustee of the National Council for Voluntary Organisations (NCVO). During his time as CEO of Guide Dogs, he "increased the number of service users by 50%, and overseen double-digit fundraising growth". He stepped down as CEO of Guide Dogs in 2016. In 2017, he became chief executive of the Tall Ships Youth Trust. In January 2022, he took up the role of Diocesan Secretary and CEO at the Diocese of Bristol in the Church of England.

== Personal life ==
In 2017, Leaman married Dr Jacqueline Anne Grey. He has two sons, Adrian and Nicholas, from his first marriage

== Honours ==
In the 1993 Queen's Birthday Honours, Leaman was appointed an Officer of the Order of the British Empire (OBE) "for disaster relief services after Hurricane Andrew". In the 2010 New Year Honours, he was appointed a Companion of the Order of the Bath (CB) "for his work on international maritime security".
