= Dick Lehman =

American ceramic artist (born 1952)

- Born: Richard D. Lehman; November 20, 1952 (age 72); Indiana, U.S.
- Education: BA Goshen College
- Occupation(s): Ceramic artist, potter
- Known for: long-wood-firing, side-firing, saggar-firing,

Dick Lehman is an American ceramics artist based in Indiana. Dozens of articles and photos featuring his techniques and insights have appeared in periodicals and books on ceramic art since 1985, including 34 articles in U.S.-published Ceramics Monthly, the largest circulating magazine in the field, plus articles in 11 other international periodicals.

More than 20 books published since the early 1990s have covered Lehman's pottery work and impact, such as 21st Century Ceramics in the United States and Canada published by the American Ceramic Society and The Art of Contemporary American Pottery by Kevin Hluch.

Lehman is known in his field for his enhancements of three firing techniques: long-wood-fire, side-fire and saggar-fire. These have yielded dramatic-looking pottery pieces, some of which reside in ceramics galleries and museums in the United States and elsewhere. In September 2016, the cover of Ceramics Monthly featured a close-up of a multi-colored, highly textured piece by Lehman that the magazine noted was thrice wood-fired. This was the third time his work was featured on the cover of Ceramics Monthly.

== Long-wood-firing ==
Lehman has written extensively about his visits to Japan, where he began in 1992 to learn from master potters knowledgeable in ancient firing techniques; in turn, Lehman was invited to exhibit his work there. Japan's Shiho Kanzaki, in particular, has been a major influence. At Kanzaki's invitation, Lehman's work was featured in two-person exhibitions in Japanese cities known for their clay and traditional porcelain, Shigaraki, Shiga, and Tamba in 1999. Kanzaki fires his anagama kiln for 10 days; his pots are placed into the kiln unglazed and come out with a natural ceramic glaze from the flying ashes. "The prolonged firing allows for a slow build-up of ash and melted surfaces into undesigned patterns known as keshiki (landscapes)."

To achieve Kanzaki-type effects without stoking a kiln at frequent intervals for 10 days, Lehman experimented for nearly three years with combining a then-new "step-down" grate design from New Zealand with a firebox which is almost as large as the kiln itself. The result was a new kiln that could be stoked less frequently for six days, followed by intensive stoking for 36 hours. Lehman thus produced pottery featuring ash glaze and design unique to the United States, yet evocative of tradition-rooted Japanese pottery and porcelain.

The result of Lehman’s brand of lateral thinking was a kiln that required stoking only five times a day over a period of six days before a final push to temperature over a 36-hour period. By this means Lehman was free to carry on a normal working and family life, yet achieve the accumulated ashed qualities seen on pots fired for ten days in an anagama kiln.

- Phil Rogers in Ash Glazes, second edition, A&C Black (London) University of Pennsylvania Press, Philadelphia, 2003, pp. 129-131

== Side-firing ==
Lehman was motivated to experiment with side-firing after visiting the studio of Shoji Takahara in Japan, who encouraged him to become acquainted with Pennsylvania potter Jack Troy. With Troy, Lehman writes, "I had the first of several experiences wood-firing anagama-style kilns. The exuberance of the four-day firings; the altered shapes propelled by the pyroplasticity of the clay; the expressions of kinetic energy exuded by the ash runs, drips and pools – all these new experiences convinced me that pursuit of my dream would inescapably lead to my own anagama-style kiln. This kiln is described under Long-Wood-Firing, but an additional development was the technique of side-fired glazed ware.

At a time when he was without access to a large wood-burning kiln, Lehman had become more and more transfixed on the idea of making pots that displayed the ‘kinetic’ qualities of molten ash that he had seen in Japan. In particular he had seen wares from Shigaraki with their emerald-green ash runs and pyroclastic bulges, effects that he was later to achieve in ‘long’ firings.... Lehman devised a system of firing his pieces suspended upon ‘one-time use’ clay tripods that provided space between the underside of the piece and the kiln shelf and a means of capturing any glaze drips that might otherwise have damaged the shelf. The pots were dipped into a single carbon-trapping Shino glaze before being set on their sides. Ash, combined with other fluxes, is sieved directly onto the wet glaze. During the firing the ash melts to form rivulets of glaze that ‘wrap’ the pot as string might wrap a parcel. The ‘dragonfly eye’ is left untouched, a central focal point. The intricate, complex surfaces of the pots belie the modesty of their firing – fired as they are alongside casseroles, pitchers and pie plates in a regular [12-hour] cone 9 reduction firing.

- Phil Rogers in Ash Glazes, second edition, A&C Black (London) University of Pennsylvania Press, Philadelphia, 2003, pp.129-131.

== Saggar-firing ==
Traditionally, closed-container saggars have been used to shield ceramics from the direct contact of flames and from damage by kiln debris. Lehman, however, pioneered using a saggar for the opposite purpose: to encapsulate ceramic pieces within a particular atmosphere: "My approach to saggar-firing is to wrap pots in fresh vegetation and place them in the saggar on their sides, atop a bed of sawdust. I then cover the pot entirely with sawdust and place the lid on the saggar. During the firing, due to the presence of heat and pressure – and due to the relative absence of oxygen – the vegetation turns to 'activated charcoal', and in the process, releases a film of carbon. When everything works just right, the film of carbon penetrates the porous porcelain pot. The images you see on the pots are the result of that 'carbon transfer', similar to the fossil-formation process called 'carbonization.'"

In Ceramics and Print, Paul Scott explains Lehman's contribution to saggar-firing:

The Swedish ceramist Herman Fogelin has referred to the kiln as a sort of washing machine. [Gerry] Caplan and others use it as a printing press, imparting color and other unique qualities. The kiln, in generating heat, can facilitate either the transfer of color from one body to another, or causes a print by reducing clay and carbonizing matter.... Dick Lehman’s carbon film transfers on sagger-fired porcelain using the same basic chemical principles as Caplan's, but in this case the materials, process and intention are different…The sagger is...closed with a lid. In the firing a receding (or anaerobic - no oxygen) atmosphere is created inside the sagger, and the vegetation turns into activated charcoal, in the process releasing a film of carbon which the biscuit porcelain absorbs, capturing the image released by the vegetation.

In Electric Kiln Ceramics, Richard Zakin elaborates on how the effects of rake and "smoke-reduction firings" can be achieved through using a simple electric kiln, rather than more elaborate wood-fired kilns. He specifically names Dick Lehman and Gerry Caplan with pioneering this approach: "Smoke-reduction firings require the use of a saggar, which is a sealed container placed inside the firing chamber. A bed of flammable material such as sawdust is placed in the base of the saggar and the ware is placed on top. More flammable material is packed around the piece. The saggar is then put into the kiln and fired. As it burns, the sawdust carbonizes the surface of the piece, creating a rich, highly varied surface." Zakin notes that this offers modern ceramic artists the "convenience and flexibility of the electric kiln" while also allowing them to "exploit the right and complex effects of smoke reduction."

Lehman's success rate with saggar-firing is less than 20%, according to Paul Scott. Nevertheless, the interesting results of the technique "propel him to continue exploring the process.”

== Other contributions ==
Lehman's career began with what he has called "production pottery" – that is, reliably reproducible hand-thrown pieces that would be attractive to paying customers: "To run a studio business with living wages for up to five people for 30 years is a great accomplishment. I am proud of that." After he began to be able to pay the bills and salaries, Lehman set aside time for himself and his staff members to experiment and play with ceramics in an artistic and adventurous manner. He introduced laser engraving on clay and pioneered low-tech thermal-shock-testing. Les Richter in American Shinto - The Glaze of a Thousand Faces writes:

Prolific, imaginative, endlessly curious, Dick Lehman never seems to sit still as a potter. In 1999 alone, he participated in twelve major exhibitions, including a solo show of sixty-five pots from a fourteen-day wood-firing, all the while running his pottery business. Lehman is a gifted and facile writer, sharing the details of his experimental success and failures and philosophy with readers of Ceramics Monthly, Ceramics: Art and Perception, Pottery Making Illustrated, and many other clay journals. His work is in important collections all over the United States and Japan.

Between 1998 and 2016, Lehman led 35 workshops for colleges, universities, and professional ceramics organizations, according to the curriculum vitae on his website, www.dicklehman.com. He was a visiting artist at Arizona State University in 1988. In 2007, works by Lehman were presented by a U.S. peace delegation to Iran's president and to religious and cultural leaders.
