= Plot (radar) =

Graphic display that shows all collated data from a ship's on-board sensors

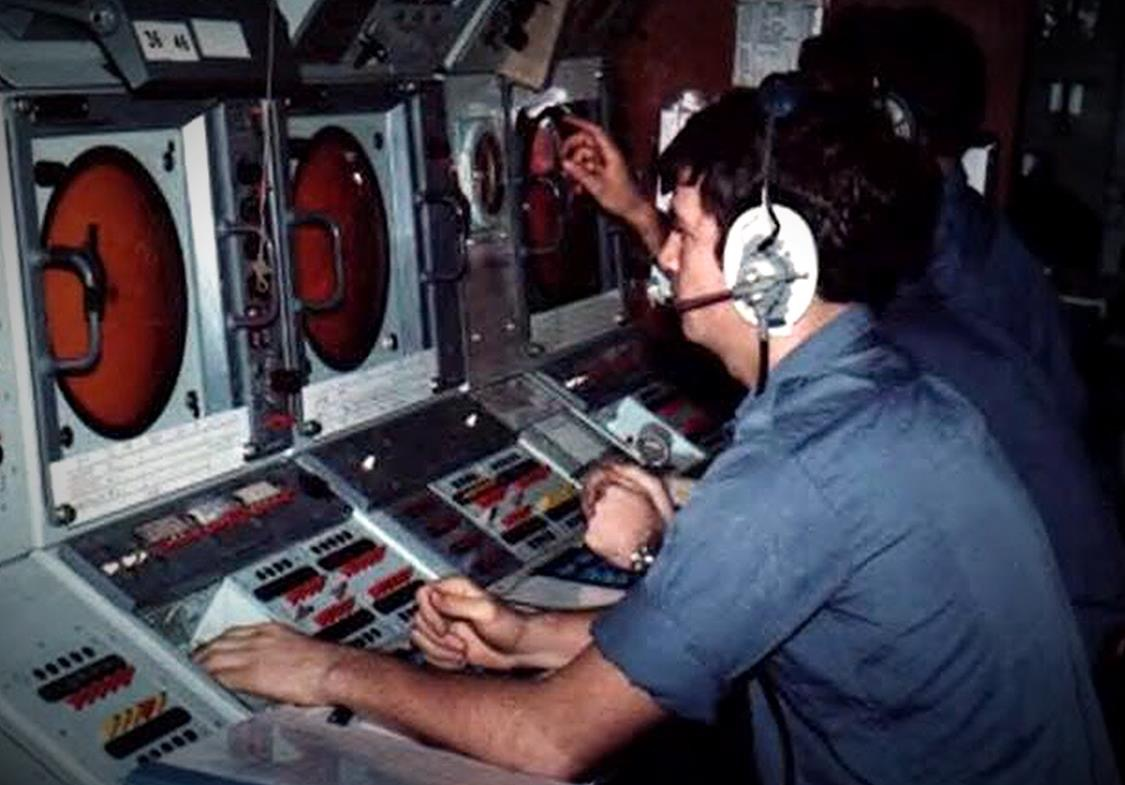
The surface plot on a Cold War era British warship

In naval terminology, a plot is a graphic display that shows all collated data from a ship's on-board sensors, i.e. radar, sonar and EW systems. They also displayed information from external sources - for example, other vessel or aircraft reports. There are four different types of plot, each with varying capabilities, i.e. range, depending on their role;

- Air plot: Used for tracking air contacts, i.e. planes and EW information.
- Surface plot: Used for tracking contacts on the surface of the water, i.e. other ships. It can also perform a variety of roles such as:
  - Providing a trace of a ship's own course and speed over time.
  - Plotting the position of a man overboard.
  - Can be used in naval gunfire support missions to plot unidentified contacts and keep track of friendly forces.
  - It also plays an important part in anti-submarine warfare operations and using torpedoes.
- Sub-surface plot: Used for tracking contacts below the surface of the water, i.e. submarines.
- General operations plot: Used for tracking shipping on a large-scale chart. Was also used to display exercise boundaries, airplanes and other significant features of maritime interest. In the Royal Australian Navy, the scale used was generally 5 or 10 miles (8.0 or 16.1 km) per 1 inch (25 mm).
