= Weapons Tight =

NATO brevity code in anti-aircraft warfare

Weapons Tight is a NATO brevity code "weapon control order" used in anti-aircraft warfare, imposing a status whereby weapons systems may only be fired at targets confirmed as hostile.

Compare to Weapons Hold, whereby it is ordered that weapons may only be fired at targets (especially aircraft or missiles) when under attack, or in response to a formal order; also compare to Weapons Free, which denotes an order that weapons may be fired at targets not positively identified as friendly. (The latter term should not be confused with the expression denoting areas without weapons in them, particularly nuclear-weapon-free zones.)
