= 205 Signal Squadron =

- Country: United Kingdom
- Allegiance: British Army
- Branch: Royal Corps of Signals
- Engagements: Falklands War

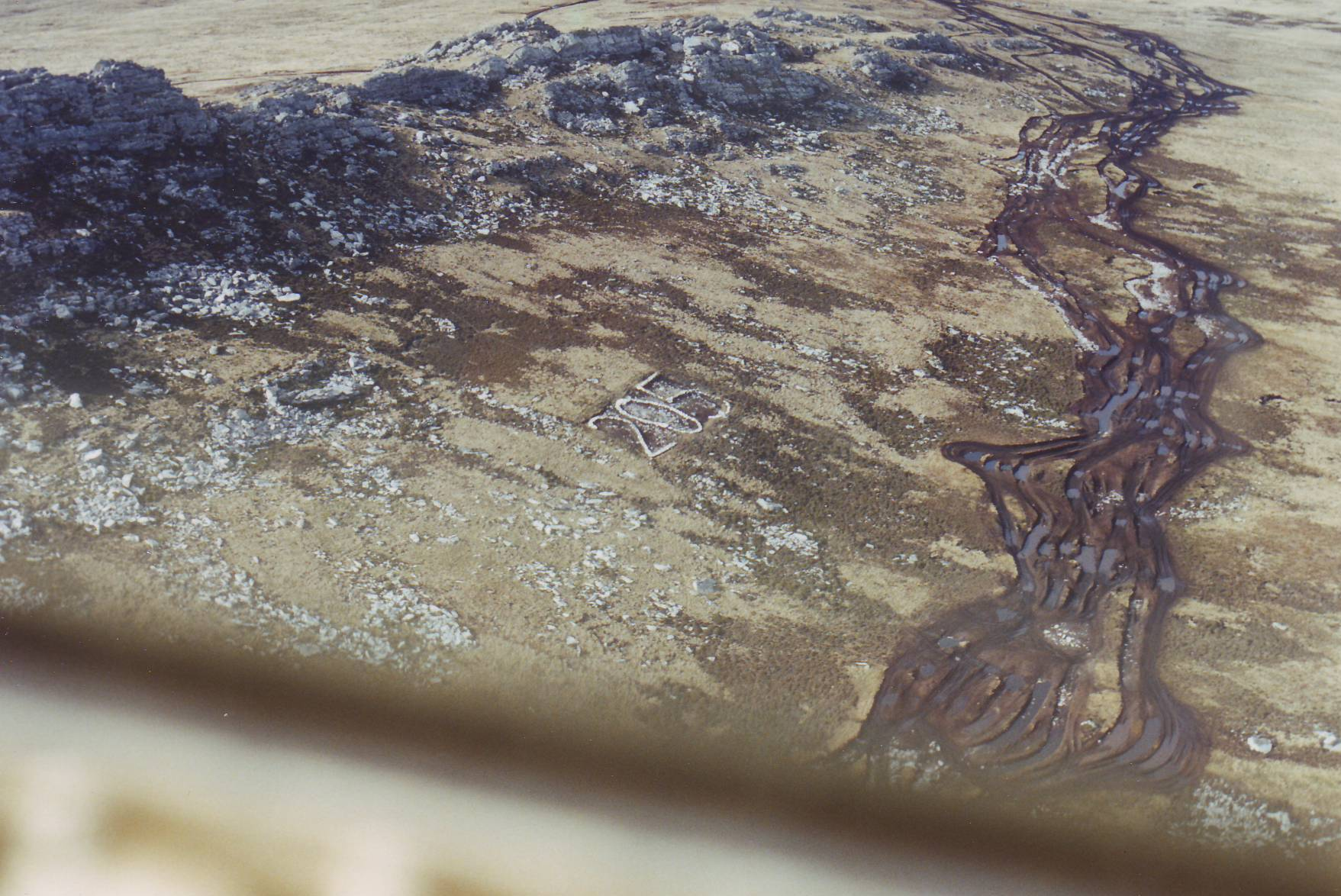
Aerial view of the memorial site, Pleasant Peak, Falkland Islands

205 Signal Squadron was a unit of the Royal Corps of Signals of the British Army. After two of their members were killed in an Army Air Corps Gazelle helicopter due to a friendly fire incident with HMS Cardiff during the Falklands War, the numbers "205" were painted at the crash site as a memorial.
