= AQP =

AQP may refer to:

- Any Qualified Provider in the English National Health Service (NHS)
- Atakapa language (ISO 639-3 code)
- ASQ Quality Press, American Society for Quality
- Appleton Municipal Airport in Appleton, Minnesota (FAA code)
- Arequipa, a city in southern Peru
- Rodríguez Ballón International Airport in Arequipa, Peru (IATA code)
- The protein family of Aquaporins, water channels
- A Quiet Place, an American horror movie franchise
- Advanced Qualification Program, FAA alternate pilot qualification method
