= Advanced Qualification Program =

The Advanced Qualification Program (AQP) is the alternate pilot qualification method by the Federal Aviation Administration. AQP is a voluntary program by pilots to meet up to the ‘traditional’ regulatory requirements. AQP serves as a means of compliance to qualify, train, and certify the competence of pilots, flight attendants and dispatchers.

== History ==
As human error had emerged as the primary cause of US air carrier accidents in the 1980s, the FAA and carriers agreed more flexible training regulations would reduce the accidents.

== Methodology ==
Operational data analysis is used to assess the participants' competency in the objective requirements for all aspects of training. Pilots are evaluated based on their ability to show proficiency in scenarios that test technical, cognitive and crew resource management skills together.

Due to the data driven nature of the program, air careers under the AQP need to design data collection strategies to measure cognitive and technical skills of the trained pilots.
