= Tempiute Mountain =

Summit in Nevada

Coordinates: 37°37′13″N 115°38′10″W

Tempiute Mountain is a summit in the Mount Irish Range, in the U.S. state of Nevada. The elevation is 7,746 feet (2,361 m).

The ghost town of Tempiute is situated to the north of the mountain, whose community used to mine the mountain.

On March 23, 1982, A United States Air Force McDonnell-Douglas F-4E-58-MC Phantom II, 73-1180, of the 4th Tactical Fighter Wing, crashed into Tempiute Mountain near Nellis AFB, Nevada; both crew members were killed.

== See also ==
- Monte Mountain
