= Monte Mountain =

Summit in Nevada

Coordinates: 37°38′11″N 115°30′36″W

Monte Mountain is a summit in the Mount Irish Range, in the U.S. state of Nevada. The elevation is 7,746 feet (2,361 m).

The ghost town of Tempiute is situated to the north-west of the mountain, whose community used to mine the mountain.
