= List of accidents and incidents involving military aircraft (1980–1989) =

This is a list of notable accidents and incidents involving military aircraft grouped by the year in which the accident or incident occurred. Not all of the aircraft were in operation at the time. Combat losses are not included except for a very few cases denoted by singular circumstances. A summary is available on the template at the bottom of the article.

== Aircraft terminology ==
Information on aircraft gives the type, and if available, the serial number of the operator in italics, the constructors number, also known as the manufacturer's serial number (c/n), exterior codes in apostrophes, nicknames (if any) in quotation marks, flight callsign in italics, and operating units.

== 1980 ==
31 January
Lockheed U-2C, 56-6714, Article 381, 21st airframe of first USAF order, delivered August 1957, to 4080th SRW, Laughlin AFB, Texas, as a 'hard nose' sampling aircraft; transferred to the Central Intelligence Agency and converted to U-2G in mid-1965; transferred to Strategic Air Command; flyable storage at Davis-Monthan AFB, Arizona, 1969. Returned to U-2C configuration for Advanced Location and Strike System (ALSS) project, 1972; damaged 2 May 1974 on landing at Davis-Monthan AFB, repaired. Written off after crash on 31 January 1980, Capt. Edward Beaumont surviving. Pilot suffered catatonic seizure, and, amazingly, descended to make uncontrolled landing in cow pasture near Oroville, California, even clipping power lines just before touchdown. Cessna T-37 Tweet trainer, flying locally, had rendezvoused with U-2 and two crew could see pilot unconscious in the cockpit. After landing, pilot revived sufficiently to shut down engine, but then, as he climbed out of the aircraft, accidentally caught the D ring of his ejection seat, which he had not safed, which fired, tossing him in a somersault, but suffered only a chipped tooth. Airframe repaired for display at 9th Strategic Reconnaissance Wing headquarters, Beale AFB, California. Pilot removed from U-2 program on medical grounds.

15 February
An Aermacchi MB-326 trainer of the Royal Australian Air Force crashes approximately 35 kilometres north-east of the Pearce RAAF base. Both trainee pilot and instructor ejected safely without injury.

19 February
Two crew are killed in the fiery crash of a McDonnell CF-101B Voodoo, 101055, c/n 602, ( originally F-101B-100-MC, 57-0424; to CAF on 8 July 1971) on runway 25 at Ottawa International Airport, Ottawa, Ontario, Canada. Capt. Pilot Robert Abbott, 29, of Ottawa, and his navigator, Capt. Albert Oostenbrug, 33, of Stratford, Ontario, were posted at CFB Chatham, New Brunswick, with No. 416 Squadron RCAF. A military spokesman said that the aircraft came in sharply and it appeared that the pilot may have initially misjudged his landing, and applied power at the last second to overshoot and circle for a second attempt. However, witnesses said the aircraft touched down hard and bounced high, then it seemed to stall and rolled over on its side and came down steeply, nose first. The aircraft started to break up as it hit the ground and then exploded in flames. This was the 20th CF-101 crash since they entered Canadian service in 1961, resulting in 16 fatalities.

14 March
A C-130H Hercules transport plane, 74–2064, was engaged in a logistics mission out of Adana-Incirlik Air Base to several U.S. military installations in Turkey. The aircraft was returning to Adana when an explosion occurred in a left wing fuel tank. At the time, the aircraft was descending through 5000 feet to 3000 feet. The flight crew lost control and the aircraft impacted terrain. At the time, the aircraft had 6 crew members and 12 passengers on board. There were no survivors.

17 April
A Lockheed P-3C Orion, 158213, was taking part in Samoa's Flag Day celebration. The aircraft was dropping skydivers near the reviewing area. During the second run, the aircraft clipped a mile-long tramway line running across the Pago Pago Harbor to Mount Alava. Part of the wing separated and the aircraft crashed into an area in front of the two-story Rainmaker Hotel. 6 crewmembers and 2 individuals on the ground were killed in the crash.

24 April

A contingent of American military aircraft embark on a commando raid to rescue a group of American hostages held by Iran. An unexpected sandstorm forces two USMC Sikorsky RH-53D Sea Stallion helicopters to divert before reaching the first rendezvous point in the Great Salt Desert of Eastern Iran, near Tabas, and causes serious mechanical damage to a third, prompting commanders to abort the mission. While attempting to evacuate personnel and equipment that had already arrived at the rendezvous point, the pilot of another Sea Stallion, BuNo 158761, due to loss of visual references while hovering in a dustcloud collides with a USAF Lockheed EC-130E Hercules, 62-1809, c/n 3770, of the 7th ACCS, killing five USAF aircrew aboard the C-130, and three USMC aircrew in the RH-53, shrapnel from the collision damaging other helicopters. Five other RH-53Ds had to be abandoned at the site after the raid force commander (Col Charles Beckwith) ordered all participants to get on board the remaining C-130s or be left behind, despite classified documents that the helicopter crews were attempting to destroy. These were BuNos. 158686, 158744, 158750, 158753 and 158758. At least one airframe was assembled from the abandoned helicopters, to join six RH-53Ds supplied by the United States to the Iranian Navy in 1978.

24 April
Lockheed U-2R, 68-10333, Article 055, fifth airframe of the first R-model order, first flown 8 May 1968, registered N812X, delivered to the CIA on 28 May 1968. To 100th SRW, mid-1974, to 9th SRW, 1976. Damaged at Akrotiri, Cyprus, this date. Repaired.

18 May
A Sikorsky CH-53D Sea Stallion, 65-183, from Marine Corps Air Station Kaneohe Bay crashed on the Hawaiian island of Molokai killing seven Marines and injuring two. The crew were on a supply run from a neighboring island when the pilot lost control and crashed one minute into the flight.

July
First prototype Rockwell HiMAT (highly maneuverable advanced technology) remotely piloted research vehicle (RPV) is damaged on its fifth flight when the landing skids break away during touchdown on the dry lake bed at Edwards AFB, California. Repairs are made and flight testing resumes 28 October 1980.

4 July
A seven-year-old boy is killed and several others are injured when he manages to fire an ejection seat in Lockheed S-3A Viking, BuNo 159769, c/n 394A-1098, of VS-24, at NAS Willow Grove, Pennsylvania during an open house.

18 or 19 July
The wreckage of a Libyan People's Air Force (Arabic: القوات الجوية الليبية) MiG-23MS is discovered crashed on the northern side of the 6,328 ft (1,929 m) Sila Mountains in Castelsilano, Calabria, southern Italy.

8 September
Oleg Grigoriyevich Kononenko, 42, a civilian test pilot selected for cosmonaut training in June 1980, to become a pilot for the Buran space shuttle, is KWF in the crash of a Yakovlev Yak-38A during take-off from the aircraft carrier Minsk in the South China Sea.

18–19 September
While performing routine maintenance in LGM-25C Titan II silo 374–7 at Damascus, Arkansas, a repairman dropped a heavy socket wrench, which rolled off of a work platform, bounced, and struck the missile, 62-0006, holing a pressurized fuel tank. The launch complex was evacuated and a specialist team of the 308th Strategic Missile Wing called in from Little Rock Air Force Base. Approximately 8 1/2 hours after the initial puncture, fuel vapours exploded, fatally injuring one team member, Senior Airman David Livingston, and injuring 21 others. The missile re-entry vehicle, which contained a W-53 nuclear warhead, was recovered intact. There was no radioactive contamination. "Six Air Force servicemen—Livingston (posthumously), Kennedy, Hukle, Devlin, Don Green, and Jimmy Roberts—were awarded Airman's Medals for Heroism for their actions on September 19, 1980, and the Titan II maintenance structure at Little Rock Air Force Base was later designated the Livingston Building in honor of Livingston."

5 October
Lockheed U-2R, 68-10340, Article 062, last of twelve R-model airframes in initial order, allocated N820X, first flown 26 November 1968, delivered to 100th Strategic Reconnaissance Wing 19 December 1968. To 9th Strategic Reconnaissance Wing 1976. Crashes in Korea this date, pilot Capt. Cleve Wallace surviving.

16 October
A Fairchild UC-123K Provider, 57-6291, c/n 20301, of the 302d Tactical Airlift Wing, Air Force Reserve, crashed at 0830 hrs. shortly after takeoff from Henry Post Army Airfield, en route home from Fort Sill, Oklahoma, to Columbus-Rickenbacker ANGB, Ohio. Four crew members died on impact, the fifth died later. KWF are Capt. George Freeland Jr.; Maj. Thomas Brady; Lt. Col. Donald Griffith; T/Sgt. Michael Snodgrass; and Sr. Amn. Robert Hass. A commemorative marker is displayed in Denver Williams Memorial Park, Wilmington, Ohio.

24 October
Soviet Air Force pilot Leonid Ivanov, selected for cosmonaut training in December 1978, is killed during a Mikoyan-Gurevich MiG-27 test flight.

29 October

A USAF Lockheed YMC-130H Hercules, 74-1683, c/n 4658, outfitted with experimental JATO rockets for Operation Credible Sport, a planned second attempt to rescue American hostages held by Iran, is destroyed when the rockets misfire during a test landing at Wagner Field, Eglin Air Force Base, Florida, United States. All crew members survive, but the rescue operation is deemed excessively risky and is cancelled.

31 October
Fifth prototype Mikoyan MiG-29, samolet 908, which first flew on 5 April 1979 is utilized for power plant testing after the loss of the third prototype. It was lost on its 48th flight when a combustion chamber failed and the resulting fire burned through control runs, causing the aircraft to dive into the ground. Pilot A. V. Fedotov attempted to eject while the aircraft was pulling negative G and received a spinal injury that hospitalized him for several months.

12 November
USAF C-141A, 67-0030, of the 62d Military Airlift Wing at McChord AFB, Washington, crashed while on approach for landing at Cairo, Egypt. All six crew and seven passengers were killed.

18 November
Two USAF Fairchild-Republic A-10 Thunderbolt II from RAF Bentwaters, 81st Tactical Fighter Wing collided over North Norfolk. Both aircraft were lost as one crashed near to Itteringham, the other in the North Sea off Winterton. Both pilots ejected prior to impact: USAF Major Steve Kaatz survived while USAF Lt Col Bill "Ole" Olesen died alongside RAF Master Air Loadmaster David Bullock when he attempted to winch Lt Col Olesen from the sea.

26 November
A military Ka-27 helicopter on a ferry flight from the manufacturer runs out of fuel and crash lands on a busy intersection in the city of Kazan, damaging a tram. While no one was killed in the crash, rumors circulated in the Soviet Union that supposedly numerous people in the tram had been killed by the rotor blades and that the Soviet government would want to hide the alleged disaster.

29 December
A U.S. Navy pilot is rescued after ejecting from a Douglas TA-4J Skyhawk on a flight from NAS Guantanamo Bay, Cuba.

== 1981 ==
12 January
Leftist terrorists, the Puerto Rican Popular Army, also known as the "Machete Wielders", seeking Puerto Rican independence, used home-made bombs to destroy eight Air National Guard LTV A-7D Corsair IIs and a retired Lockheed F-104C Starfighter at the Puerto Rico Air National Guard's Muñiz Air National Guard Base, located on the north-eastern corner of the Luis Muñoz Marín International Airport in San Juan, Puerto Rico. Three bombs in two aircraft were removed before they exploded. Security at the base was so slack that the bombers were able to enter and leave without detection.

4 February
A United States Air Force General Dynamics F-111F, 72-1441, c/n E2-71 / F-71, of the 48th Tactical Fighter Wing, crashed on approach to RAF Lakenheath, Bury St. Edmunds, United Kingdom, coming down in an open field in Suffolk. A statement released by the Mildenhall headquarters of U.S. Third Air Force said that the pilot and WSO parachuted to safety and were both based at Lakenheath.

7 February
1981 Pushkin Tu-104 crash
A Tupolev Tu-104 airliner belonging to the Soviet Pacific Fleet and carrying high-ranking officers on the return from a staff maneuvers in Leningrad crashed on take-off at a military airfield in Pushkin, Leningrad oblast. Out of 52 aboard, including 16 generals and admirals and 20 captains, 51 are pronounced dead at the scene, and the co-pilot later dies in hospital from his injuries. Admiral Emil Spiridonov, the fleet's commanding officer, was among the killed. The reason was later determined to be the improper loading of the aircraft, with a part of the cargo, two huge rolls of book paper, unsecured and shifting during the take-off, causing a wingstrike.

10 February
Two United States Marine Corps helicopters, a Boeing Vertol CH-46F Sea Knight, BuNo 157666, c/n 2565, 'YT-??', of HMM-164, and a Sikorsky CH-53 Sea Stallion, collided over MCAS Tustin, California, United States, with six killed.

13 February
An Aermacchi SF.260 of the Belgian Air Force crashed near Peruwelz, Belgium, two killed.

20 February
An Indian Army HAL Cheetah helicopter collided with a HAL Pushpak near Patiala airfield in India. Four crew killed (two in each aircraft) and a woman on the ground.

20 February
A Bell UH-1 of the Royal Thai Army crashed in southern Thailand, all 11 onboard killed.

4 March
Two USAF McDonnell-Douglas F-4 Phantom IIs collided near Albacete, Spain, crash in flames, killing two of the four crew. The other two parachuted to safety. Airframes involved were F-4D, serial given by one source as 66-755, but this may be only a partial, 'SP' tail code, of the 401st Tactical Fighter Wing, and F-4D-30-MC, 66-7620, 'TJ' tail code, of the 52d Tactical Fighter Wing. Both fighters were on a routine training mission from Torrejon Air Base near Madrid. The crash occurred ~130 miles SE of Madrid.

15 March
A Boeing RC-135S Cobra Ball assigned to the 24th Expeditionary Reconnaissance Squadron operating out of Eielson Air Force Base in Fairbanks, Alaska crashed while attempting to land in poor weather at Eareckson Air Station (then known as Shemya Air Force Base) in the Alaskan Aleutian Islands. The cause of the crash was the pilots misidentifying the approach lights as the landing strip lights. The force of the crash sheared off the landing gear and the two right-wing mounted engines. The airframe broke in two and was ignited by burning fuel from fuel tank explosions. Six of the 24 people aboard the aircraft perished: Major William R. Bennett; Captain Larry A. Mayfield; 1st Lieutenant Loren O. Ginter; Master Sergeant Stephen L. Kish; Staff Sergeant Steven C. Balcer; Staff Sergeant Harry L. Parsons III.

15 April
A United States Air Force pilot mistakenly shot down an F-4E-54-MC Phantom II, 72-1486, c/n 4445, of the 526th Tactical Fighter Squadron, 86th Tactical Fighter Wing, TDY from Ramstein Air Base, West Germany on WSEP training, during a training mission over the Gulf of Mexico with an AIM-9 Sidewinder missile. The two-man crew, Capt. M. R. "Ruddy" Dixon and Captain Charles G. Sallee, ejected from the burning F-4 and were rescued quickly. The jets were about 40 minutes into their flight. The Air Force blamed the mishap on inadequate briefing, a failure on behalf of the crews to follow procedures and the fact that the F-4 and the target aircraft looked similar.

25 April
Israeli Defense Force Dassault Mirage IIICJ Shachak, 44, was overstressed in a landing accident at Hatzor Airbase, WFU. Now displayed in a small airpark on Hatzor AB, one of only three surviving examples in Israel.

6 May
A mechanical failure caused an abrupt nose pitch-down of United States Air Force Boeing EC-135N ARIA, 61-0328, call sign AGAR 23, of the 4950th Test Wing, Wright-Patterson AFB, Ohio, from Flight Level 290, disappearing from radar at 10:49:48 EDT to crash in a farmer's field, in Walkersville, Maryland. All 21 aboard were killed. A memorial is scheduled to be built at Walkersville Heritage Farm Park pending funds.

9 May
Thunderbird 6, a United States Air Force Northrop T-38A Talon of the Thunderbirds demonstration team crashed during a display at Hill AFB, Utah, United States, pilot killed.

21 May
Ecuadorian Air Force de Havilland Canada DHC-6 crashed into high ground in bad weather with the loss of all 18 on board.

24 May
A Beechcraft 200 Super King Air of the Fuerza Aérea Ecuatoriana, FAE-723, flew into a Huairapungo Mountain, Loja Province, Ecuador, with the loss of all nine on board including Jaime Roldós Aguilera, the President of Ecuador.

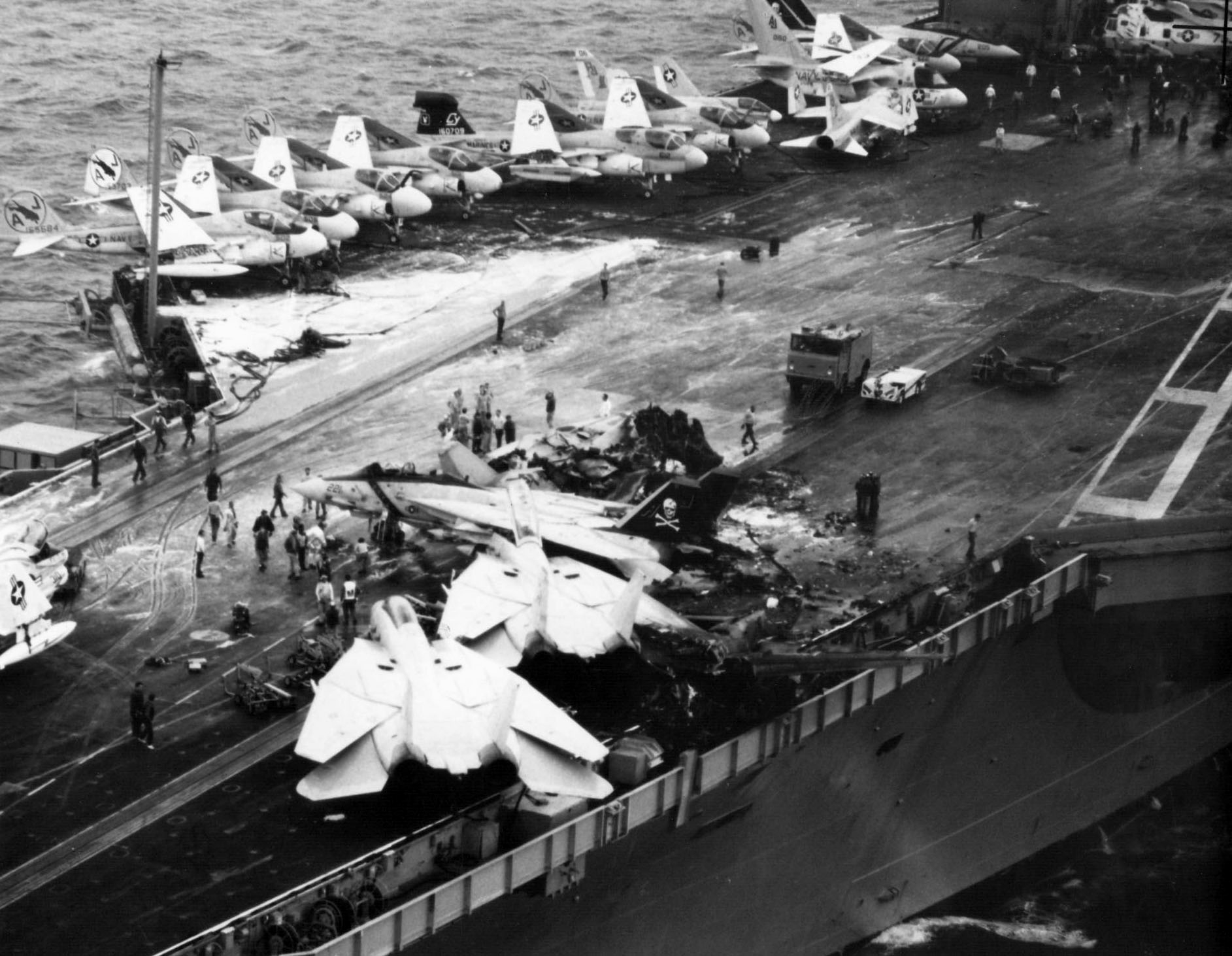
View of the flight deck of USS Nimitz after the crash of the EA-6B.

26 May
Grumman EA-6B Prowler, BuNo 159910, of VMAQ-2 Detachment Y, crash landed on the flight deck of USS Nimitz, off the Florida coast, killing 14 crewmen and injuring 45 others (some reports say 42, some 48). The crash was the result of the aircraft missing the last arresting cable, while ignoring a wave-off command. Two Grumman F-14 Tomcats struck and destroyed (BuNos. 161138 and 160385), three F-14s, nine LTV A-7 Corsair IIs, three S-3A Vikings, one Grumman A-6 Intruder and one Sikorsky SH-3 Sea King damaged. Forensic testing conducted found that several members of the deceased flight deck crew tested positive for marijuana (the officers on board the aircraft were never tested, claimed one report). The responsibility for the accident was placed on the deck crew. The official naval inquiry stated that the accident was the result of drug abuse by the enlisted crewmen of Nimitz, despite the fact that every death occurred during the impact of the crash, none of the enlisted deck crew were involved with the operation of the aircraft, and not one member of the deck crew was killed fighting the fire. As a result of this incident, President Ronald Reagan instituted a "Zero Tolerance" policy across all of the armed services—which started the mandatory drug testing of all US service personnel. In another report, however, the Navy stated that pilot error, possibly caused by an excessive dosage of brompheniramine, a cold medicine, in the blood of pilot Marine 1st Lt. Steve E. White, of Houston, Texas, "may have degraded the mental and physical skills required for night landings." The report described brompheniramine as "a common antihistamine decongestant cold medicine ingredient." "Last October [1981], Rep. Joseph P. Addabbo, (D-N.Y.) said that an autopsy conducted on the pilot's body disclosed up to 11 times the recommended dosage of a cold remedy in his system." This report seems to bely the above account that no testing was done on the flight crew.

29 May
The Bell X-14B, NASA N704NA, originally USAF 56-0422, upgraded from the A-configuration with an onboard computer and digital fly-by-wire control system installed to enable emulation of landing characteristics of other VTOL aircraft, and used in this test role, was damaged beyond repair in a landing accident this date. The airframe was saved from being scrapped and is now under restoration at the Ropkey Armor Museum, Crawfordsville, Indiana.

17 June
Two Indonesian Air Force BAe Hawk T.53s collided over Indonesia.

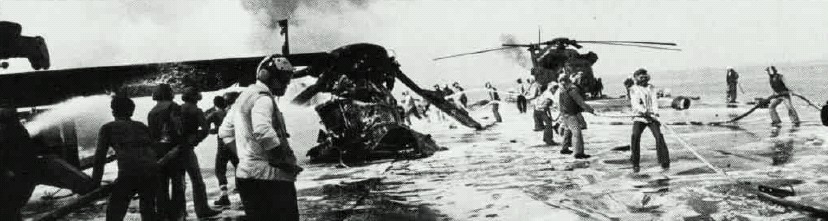
Crewmen fighting a fire after the crash of a Sea Stallion helicopter on USS Guam in 1981.

19 July
Aboard USS Guam, while operating 50 km (31 mi) southeast of Morehead City, North Carolina, United States, a Sikorsky CH-53 Sea Stallion helicopter crashed into another CH-53 and a Bell UH-1N Twin Huey upon landing. Four crewmen died and 10 were injured.

31 July
A Belgian Air Force Dassault Mirage VBR hit a radio mast at Dudelange, Luxembourg.

2 August
Fuerza Aérea Panamena de Havilland Canada DHC-6 Twin Otter 300, FAP-205, c/n 284, departed Penonomé, Panama at 1140 hrs. for Coclecito, Panama, with two crew and Panama's President General Omar Torrijos and four of his aides aboard. Before reaching the destination the airplane flew into the side of Marta Mountain at an altitude of 3,400 ft (1,000 m) at ~1200 hrs., killing all seven.

7 August
Sikorsky HH-3F Pelican, U.S. Coast Guard 1471, c/n 61-633, crashed into water in the Gulf of Alaska whilst performing a hoist to a distressed 26-foot (7.9 m) fishing vessel Marlene in bad weather. The crew of four drowned after egressing the inverted aircraft. Helicopter recovered and taken back to CGAS Kodiak; overhauled and returned to service. KWF were Lt. Ernest (Pat) Rivas, pilot; Lt. Joseph Spoja, co-pilot; AM1 Scott Finfrock and AT3 John Snyder Jr. The bodies of all but Spoja were recovered.

19 August
A Royal Australian Air Force Bell UH-1 Iroquois fatally crashed at Willamstown, New South Wales. All UH-1Bs are grounded.

19 August
Two Libyan Air Force Sukhoi Su-22s were shot down off of the Libyan coast by two United States Navy Grumman F-14A Tomcats of VF-41 from USS Nimitz.

2 September
Two Italian Air Force Fiat G.91PANs of the Frecce Tricolori collided over Rivolto during a team practice, team leader is killed.

5 September
LT Clint Nicely (pilot) was killed when his LTV A-7E Corsair II (BuNo 156844) went overboard after landing aboard USS Dwight D. Eisenhower while operating in the Norwegian Sea. After landing, the pilot found he had lost hydraulic power and extended his fuel probe to indicate that loss so that he could be towed. He regained hydraulic control and began taxiing to the rail. Upon reaching the rail and applying his brakes, hydraulic control failed again and the aircraft went over the side, impacting the water inverted. Pilot was unable to escape the aircraft and drowned. His body was not recovered.

6 September
A United States Air Force Northrop T-38A-75-NO Talon, 68-8182, '1', of the Thunderbirds display team crashed on take-off at Cleveland, Ohio, United States following a bird strike. The team leader, Lt. Col. David L. Smith, was killed and the teams displays for the rest of the year are cancelled.

17 September
Near Sardinia, Italy, a USMC Sikorsky CH-53C Sea Stallion helicopter crashed while attempting to land aboard USS Guadalcanal during training exercises, killing all five crewmen.

17 September
At Strassberg, Germany, a mid-air collision with a USAF Rockwell OV-10A Bronco (66-13553) and a German Army Aviation Aérospatiale Alouette II Helicopter (75+29) during NATO exercise "Scharfe Klinge". Stuffz Andreas Heinze (25), Hptm Reinhard Ertl (31) and Capt Donald Peter Keller (29) were killed.

26 September
Vietnamese Cosmonaut Bùi Thanh Liêm (June 30, 1949 – September 26, 1981), a native of Hanoi, Vietnam, was killed in a training flight in a Mikoyan-Gurevich MiG-21 over the Gulf of Tonkin this date.

28 September or 30 September (sources differ)
During a NAVAIR weapons release test over Chesapeake Bay, a McDonnell-Douglas F/A-18A-3-MC Hornet, BuNo 160782, c/n 8, out of NAS Patuxent River, Maryland, dropped a vertical ejector bomb rack with an inert Mk. 82 bomb from the port wing, which sheared off the outer starboard wing of Douglas TA-4J Skyhawk camera chase aircraft, BuNo 156896, c/n 13989. The Skyhawk caught fire as it began an uncontrolled spin. Two crew successfully ejected before the Skyhawk impacted in the bay. The whole sequence was caught on film from a second chase aircraft. Video of this accident is widely available on the web.

29 September
A United States Air Force Sikorsky MH-53 (HH-53B "Super Jolly Green Giant") registration number 66-14435, assigned to the 551st Special Operations Squadron (then the 1551st) crashed at the 6,000 foot level (N35-25-13, W107-20-37) of 11,301 foot Mount Taylor near Grants, New Mexico. Four of the six aboard perished at the crash site, the two survivors were critically injured later succumbed to their injuries. Killed were Captain J. P. Grant Jr., 31, Meridian, Miss., aircraft commander, 2nd Lieutenant. Richard J. Wendin, Fairfield, Conn., pilot, Sergeant Terry O. Chancey, 27, Patterson, Ga., instructor flight engineer, Sergeant Luis Caraballo, Bronx, N.Y., flight engineer, Captain Randy K. Jensen, 31, Sierra Vista, Ariz, co-pilot, and Sgt. Robert E. Hoon, 24, St. Louis, crew chief. Following the crash, Captain Jensen, despite an injured hip and severe burns, was able to pull flight engineer Chancey from the wreckage, before collapsing. He was posthumously awarded the Airman's Medal for his actions.

22 October
A United States Coast Guard Sikorsky HH-52A Seaguard, 1427, crashed near Mobile, Alabama, United States, four crew killed.

29 October
A United States Navy Grumman EA-6B Prowler, BuNo 159582, 'AC-604', of VAQ-138, from NAS Whidbey Island, Washington, crashed at 0850 hrs. in a rural field near Virginia Beach, Virginia, killing three crew. Wreckage sprayed onto nearby houses, a barn and a stable with 35 horses, but no fires were sparked and there were no ground injuries. The Prowler had departed NAS Norfolk with three other aircraft at 0832 hrs., bound for USS John F. Kennedy, off the Virginia coast before crashing three miles (4.8 km) from NAS Oceana. Navy officials said they did not know if the pilot was trying for Oceana.

30 October
A United States Air Force Boeing B-52D Stratofortress, 55-078, of the 22d Bomb Wing, March AFB, California, crashed on the eastern Colorado prairie near La Junta at 0630 hrs. while on a low-level (400 ft, 120 m altitude) training mission, killing all eight crew. No weapons were on board.

2 November
McDonnell-Douglas F-15A-14-MC Eagle. 75-0051, of the 59th TFS, 33d TFW, based at Eglin AFB, crashed near Panama City, Florida after a mid-air collision with McDonnell Douglas F-15A Eagle, 76-0048, during night refuelling. Pilot killed. Second F-15 lands okay.

17 November
A United States Navy Lockheed S-3 Viking from USS Nimitz is lost near Sardinia with all four aviators killed.

22 November
United States Navy LTV A-7E-11-CV Corsair II, BuNo 158678, 'AJ-310', of VA-82 from the USS Nimitz air wing and based at Cecil Field, Florida, crashed at 1200 hrs roughly 120 mi (190 km) northwest of Sardinia. Aircraft was returning to the ship after routine mission.

18 December
A USAF F-4E Phantom II crashed into the Atlantic, off Wilmington, North Carolina Lt. Michael Mattson, pilot, MIA. Lt Thomas Tiller, navigator, ejected rescued from life raft six days later. Catastrophic electrical failure.

19 December
The United States Navy Grumman F-14 Tomcat, BuNo 159623, NG-205, of US Navy Fighter Squadron 24 VF-24 was lost during a carrier landing mishap aboard USS Constellation while deployed in the Indian Ocean. The aircraft caught the #4 arresting cable, which was set for the wrong aircraft weight. Pilot and RIO ejected successfully and were rescued by an SH-3 flown by HS-8 (now HSC-8). The Tomcat sank after floating a few minutes.

== 1982 ==
7 January
Lt. Colleen A. Cain, the U.S. Coast Guard's first female HH-52 Seaguard helicopter pilot, died in the line of duty when HH-52, CG-1420, on which she was co-pilot, crashed into a mountainside 50 miles E of Honolulu. The pilot, LCdr. H. W. Johnson, and aircrewman AD2 D. L. Thompson, were also killed.

18 January
The Diamond Crash, the worst accident in U.S. Air Force Thunderbirds Demonstration Team history involving show aircraft, when four Northrop T-38A Talons, Numbers 1–4, 68–8156, -8175, -8176 and -8184, crashed during pre-season training on Range 65 at Indian Springs Air Force Auxiliary Field, Nevada (now Creech Air Force Base). While practicing the four-aircraft line abreast loop, the formation impacted the ground at high speed, instantly killing all four pilots: Major Norm Lowry, leader, Captain Willie Mays, Captain Pete Peterson and Captain Mark Melancon. The cause of the crash was officially listed by the USAF as the result of a mechanical problem with the #1 aircraft's control stick actuator. During formation flight, the wing and slot pilots visually cue off the #1 lead aircraft, completely disregarding their positions in relation to the ground. The crash of a team support Fairchild C-123 Provider on 10 October 1958 killed 19.

5 February
A Fairchild C-123 transport plane of the ROK Air Force crashed while on approach to Jeju International Airport, in Jeju City, killing all 53 occupants on board the aircraft.

8 February
An Indian Air Force Fairchild C-119 Flying Boxcar crashed near Lohai Malhar hilly area of Kathua district due to bliding snow and rain, resulting in the death of all 23 occupants.

9 February
AMHC Gilbert Chavarria attached to US Navy VF-154 the Black Knights, while on board USS Coral Sea died after being blown into a parked F-4 Phantom II, by another F-4 Phantom during flight deck operations in the Sea of Japan.

22 February
Blue Angels pilot Lcdr. Stu Powrie, 1970 Naval Academy graduate killed in A-4 Skyhawk crash during airshow practice.

10 March
A Fuerza Aérea de Chile ENAER T-35 Pillán, 101, was written off, pilot killed.

13 March
Boeing KC-135A-BN Stratotanker, 57-1489, assigned to the 197th Air Refueling Squadron, 161st Air Refueling Group, Arizona Air National Guard, crashed south of Luke AFB, Arizona. The KC-135 was on an instrument approach to Luke when a Grumman AA-1 Yankee, N6160L, collided with it aft of the wings, causing the tail section to separate from the rest of the aircraft, leading to loss of control and crash. All four crew members in the KC-135 and the two civilians in the Yankee were killed.

15 March
A Royal Swedish Air Force Saab Draken crashed into the Baltic, pilot killed.

19 March
Boeing KC-135A-BN Stratotanker, 58-0031, assigned to the 108th Air Refueling Squadron, 126th Air Refueling Wing, Illinois Air National Guard, crashed near Greenwood, Illinois. The KC-135 was returning from K.I. Sawyer AFB, Michigan to its home base at Chicago O'Hare International Airport when an explosion occurred at 13,700 feet (4,200 m) due to an overheated fuel pump. All four crew members and 23 passengers in the KC-135 were killed.

23 March
An Eglin Air Force Base General Dynamics F-16B Block 5 Fighting Falcon, 78-0112, of the 4485th Test Squadron, crashed into a green at Rocky Bayou Country Club, near Niceville, Florida. The pilot had just finished a test bombing run over Eglin's Range 52 and lost power in the engine. The pilot was able to get the aircraft to an altitude of about 3,000 ft (910 m) and a speed of between 285 and 345 mph (459 and 555 km/h) before the engine gave out. The pilot, and a weapons officer decided to eject, expecting the F-16 to continue north and crash into a wooded area of the Eglin reservation. According to officer in charge of Eglin's safety office, the dual ejection caused the aircraft to roll to the right and slam into the golf course's sixth green, narrowly missing several homes. The two airmen landed on the 18th green and suffered no major injuries. Air Force investigators were able to later watch the entire crash because a chase aircraft that had been photographing the test mission caught the crash on film. When F-16 experts recreated the accident they discovered a sequence of control switch moves that would restart an F-16 engine. The procedures were added to F-16 instruction manuals.

23 March
A United States Air Force McDonnell-Douglas F-4E-58-MC Phantom II, 73-1180, of the 4th Tactical Fighter Wing, crashed into Tempiute Mountain near Nellis AFB, Nevada; both crew members were killed.

31 March
The first military aircraft of the young air force of Suriname (SAF) was a Hughes 500 – Model 369D helicopter (c/n 117-0193D), simply registered SAF-100 and being used for light observation tasks. Unfortunately this aircraft was written off on 31 March 1982 killing all five occupants (Major Henk Fernandes, second lieutenant Norman de Miranda, soldier Tjon a Kon and soldier Kowid), including pilot Foster Ford. The crash occurred while the helicopter was on a search and rescue mission near the Guyanese border, searching for military troops which lost their way in the amazon jungle. A peculiar fact is that one of the victims of this tragedy, Battalion commander Major Henk Fernandes, had already been appointed earlier to replace Sergeant Laurens Neede as Minister of Army and Police in 1982. The crash occurred before the inauguration of the then new twelve ministers cabinet of Suriname under Prime Minister Henry Neijhorst.

2 April
An Armada de la República Argentina (ARA) Westland Lynx HAS.2 from the 1ra Escuadrilla Aeronaval de Helicópteros supporting the Argentinian invasion of the Falklands crashes into the sea near ARA Santísima Trinidad.

13 April
A United States Air Force Lockheed C-130 Hercules crashed in east-central Turkey killing all 27 on board. The aircraft was assigned to the 463d Airlift Group at Dyess Air Force Base in Abilene, Texas. The aircrew was conducting a normal supply mission from Erzurum in eastern Anatolia to Incirlik Air Base. Among those who perished was 23 year old 1st Lieutenant Robert J. Babineau, a 1980 graduate of the United States Air Force Academy.

14 April
A United States Army Bell UH-1 crashed near Fort Rucker, Alabama, four killed.

14 April
A United States Air Force McDonnell-Douglas F-4D-28-MC Phantom II, 65-0770, crashed on the Avon Park Range in Florida, both crew killed.

20 April
Lockheed F-117A, 80-785, crashes on take-off on its first test flight at Groom Lake, Nevada, due to crossed wiring of the yaw controls, coming to rest inverted adjacent to the runway. Lockheed test pilot Bob Ridenhauer survives with serious injuries and retires from test flying. He has to be cut out of the overturned cockpit section. This was the first loss of a production Nighthawk and occurred prior to Air Force acceptance. This was almost exactly the same wiring mistake that caused the loss of a Lockheed A-12 on 28 December 1965.

22 April
During the Falklands War, British SAS troops deployed from HMS Antrim, attempt to reconnoitre Fortuna Glacier on South Georgia island in preparation for recapture by UK forces but are hit by bad weather. One Westland Wessex HAS.3 and two Westland Wessex HU.5 helicopters (XT464 and XT473) of 845 Naval Air Squadron attempt a rescue in difficult conditions. After loading the troops, one Wessex 5 crashes on the glacier but all aboard survive. The personnel are then redistributed onto the other two helicopters, whereupon the second Wessex 5 also crashes on lift-off, leaving seventeen stranded on the glacier (thirteen SAS and four helicopter crew). The Wessex 3 navigator Lt. Chris Parry, returning to the glacier as nightfall comes on, loads 17 into a helicopter able to carry 5, returns to the Antrim, which is pitching in a rough sea, and pilot Lt. Cmdr. Ian Stanley crashes the Wessex onto the deck, concluding the rescue of the seventeen stranded men, who would likely have perished had they not been evacuated from the glacier. Pilot Stanley and two other airmen are awarded the DSO for the rescue operation, although the Ministry of Defense suppresses news of the loss of three helicopters.

26 April
SFC Clifford Wilson Strickland is picked up by a Lockheed MC-130 Combat Talon of the 7th Special Operations Squadron at CFB Lahr, Germany, during Flintlock 82 exercise, using Fulton STARS recovery system, but falls to his death reportedly due to faulty equipment in 1400 hrs accident. This will be the last ever attempt to utilize the Skyhook system.

2 May
USAF Northrop T-38, tail number 63-8160, from the 14th Student Flying Wing, crashed in the final turn on approach at Columbus AFB. Two fatalities, student and instructor. Aircraft damage: Written off (damaged beyond repair). Narrative: Stall/Excessive descent rate in turn to final.

6 May
Royal Navy Sea Harrier FRS.1s, XZ452, '007', and XZ453, '009', of 801 Naval Air Squadron on combat air patrol from HMS Hermes of the Falklands task force, collide in poor visibility, killing pilots Lt. Cmdr. John Eyton-Jones in 452 and Lt. Alan Curtis in 453. Another source states that they were from HMS Invincible.

10 May
U.S. Marine Corps A-4M Skyhawk, BuNo 160038, 'WL 02', of VMA-311, based at MCAS El Toro, California, crashes in the California desert 40 miles (64 km) east of Barstow after suffering engine failure. Maj. R. L. Barton, during recovery from strafe run at Twenty Nine Palms, experiences loss of power and ejects after unsuccessful attempts to regain power.

13 May
A United States Navy Boeing Vertol HH-46A Sea Knight, BuNo. 152511, c/n 2131, of HC-16, crashed into the Gulf of Mexico off Pensacola, Florida, one killed.

17 May
At RAF Linton-on-Ouse, the pilot of an RAF Jet Provost T5A aircraft crashed and was killed during a barrel roll while practicing for an aerobatics competition.

19 May
A Royal Navy Westland Sea King HC.4, ZA294, transferring from HMS Hermes to HMS Intrepid during the Falklands conflict, crashes into the sea after a bird strike with a black-browed albatross. The crash results in 22 fatalities including 18 members of the 22 Squadron SAS, one fatality each from the Royal Signals and Royal Air Force.

20 May
A Dassault Mirage III of the Força Aérea Brasileira crashed, two crew killed.

25 May
An RAF Hawker-Siddeley/McDonnell-Douglas F-4 Phantom II FGR.2, XV422, of 92 Squadron, piloted by Roy Laurence and Alistair Inverarity was engaging a Royal Air Force SEPECAT Jaguar GR.1, XX963, c/n S.85, 'AL', of 14 Squadron, piloted by Flt. Lt. D. Steve Griggs in training exercises. During the encounter the Phantom shot a live AIM-9L Sidewinder forcing the Jaguar pilot to eject, 35 miles (56 km) northeast of Bruggen, West Germany. The incident occurred during a simulated airfield attack. "The fact that Laurence's master armament switch had not been taped over in the 'safe' position, plus an unreliable circuit breaker in the missile firing electronics, coupled with some confusion on board the aircraft about following 'unarmed' intercept routines in an armed Phantom, all led to a Sidewinder impacting Flt Lt Steve Griggs' Jaguar. It was the first incident of its kind in the RAF. Griggs, an ex-Phantom pilot, ejected in good order."

2 June
A Royal Air Force Avro Vulcan B.2 XM597 on Operation Black Buck during the Falklands War is forced to divert to Brazil after breaking a refuelling-probe. The aircraft was interned at the Brazilian air force base, Aérea de Santa Cruz, Rio de Janeiro and was allowed to leave nine days later due to the arrival of Pope John Paul II on a pastoral visit to Brazil.

6 June
Westland Gazelle AH1 XX377 is shot down by friendly fire from HMS Cardiff during the Falklands War.

21 June
A United States Marine Corps Boeing Vertol CH-46D Sea Knight, BuNo. 153323, crashed into the Atlantic off Cape May, New Jersey, killing one of the crew.

22 June
Magyar Légierō, Hungarian Air Force Mil Mi-24D, 113, crashes, killing one crew.

5 July
An Esercito Italiano (Italian Army) Agusta-Bell 205 crashes in the Val Ridanna, pilot killed.

6 July
A United States Navy F-4S Phantom II, BuNo. 157279, upgraded from an F-4J-42-MC, crashed off USS Forrestal following failure of the catapult strap, pilot missing. No mention of fate of the RIO.

13 July
A United States Marine Corps F-4S Phantom II, BuNo. 158377, upgraded from an F-4J-47-MC, flew into the ground close to MCAS Yuma, Arizona, both crew killed.

13 July
A United States Marine Corps F-4S Phantom II, BuNo. 153819, of VMFA-251, upgraded from an F-4J-30-MC, crashed into the Atlantic Ocean off South Carolina. Joe Baugher lists this, and notes that the same airframe is also reported to have been damaged beyond repair as a QF-4S during a high-speed power turn at San Nicholas, California on 28 April 1999.

27 July
A USAF Sikorsky HH-53C, 69-5792, (conflict here—second source lists it as 69-5782) from the 1551st CCTW at Kirtland AFB, New Mexico, crashed following a descent from a night time refueling mission, four killed.

27 July
A United States Air Force F-5B and a F-5F collide over Tucson, Arizona, three crew ejected but one was killed.

28 July
RAF Hawk T1 Trainer XX305 suffered a Cold Air Unit Failure, which caused the cockpit to fill with acidic gases. The aircraft stalled out on final at RAF Valley, and both Pilots ejected. Instructor Flt. Lt. N. J. Demery survived with heavy injuries, while Student Pilot Flt. Lt. Paul Christian Gay died.

30 July
USCG HC-130H CG1600, c/n 4757, assigned Kodiak CGAS, crashed 4 kilometres (2.5 mi) south of Attu, Aleutian Islands, in bad weather landing – killing two Coast Guardsmen aboard, one crewman and one passenger. The remaining six crewmen and one passenger survived, some with significant injuries.

17 August
A United States Army Reserve Medevac UH-1H Crashed at Salt Lake City International Airport during an Auto-rotation exercise. Killing the pilot. Other crew members sustained serious injuries.

31 August
USAF C-141B, 64-0652 crashed in Tennessee, in the mountains of Cherokee National Forest during a training mission. All nine crew members were killed.

9 September
A Royal Swedish Air Force Saab Viggen crashed into Mount Hirvasaive, Lappland, pilot killed.

11 September
At an airshow in Mannheim, Germany, celebrating the 375th anniversary of that city, a United States Army Boeing-Vertol CH-47C Chinook, 74-22292, of the 295th Assault Support Helicopter Company—"Cyclones", located at Coleman Army Airfield, Coleman Barracks, near Mannheim, carrying parachutists crashed, killing 46 people. The crash was later found to be caused by an accumulation of ground walnut shells that had been used to clean the machinery.

15 September
A Greek Air Force F-84F exploded over Larissa, three people on the ground killed.

7 October
BA-55 a Belgian Air Force Dassault Mirage 5BA crashed into a quarry at Bierset, pilot killed.

9 October
A USMC F-4 is lost in the South China Sea, flying from Cubi Point NAS in the Philippines, both crew lost at sea.

13 October
A JASDF McDonnell-Douglas F-4EJ Phantom II, 47-8343, crashes into the Sea of Japan near Komatsu, Ishikawa Prefecture, Japan.

20 October
A Swiss Air Force Hawker Hunter is shot down by another Hunter, crossing its gunfire path during a 'live' exercise at Cherroux near Payerne Air Base, Switzerland.

21 October
A Swiss Air Force Sud Alouette III crashed near Urnasch, six killed.

26 October
A West German Air Force Lockheed F-104G Starfighter crashed in the Netherlands, pilot killed.

8 November
A United States Air Force in Europe F-4 crashed near Hannover, West Germany, both crew killed.

14 November
A Mitsubishi T-2B, 19-5174, of the Blue Impulse (or 11 Squadron) air demonstration team of the Japanese Air Self-Defense Force failed to pull out of a descending bomb-burst maneuver following a formation loop, crashed into civilian house, Takaoka Town, Hamamatsu City, Shizuoka Prefecture, north of Hamamatsu Air Base, during base's 30th anniversary air show, killing pilot Capt. Takashima Kiyoshi. Thirteen civilians injured, 28 civilian houses and about 290 cars damaged.

26 November
An Indian Air Force Mil Mi-8 crashed in Mizoram province, nine killed.

29 November
Shortly after completing a training mission, a USAF Boeing B-52G Stratofortress, 59-4766, suffered hydraulics fire in nose gear, exploded at the end of the runway at Castle AFB, California, but crew of nine escaped before it was fully engulfed. Aircraft commander ordered evacuation as soon as he learned of the wheel fire.

6 December
A Hungarian Air Force Antonov An-26 "Curl" serialled "210" (C/N 2210) crashes at Szentkirályszabadja with the loss of 4 of the 5 crew. Aircraft was one of six on strength.

16 December
57-6482 a United States Air Force B-52G crashed after take-off from Mather AFB, nine killed.

29 December
An Indian Air Force helicopter crashed near Gantok, five killed.

30 December
A military HAL Ajeet trainer operated by Hindustan Aeronautics Limited exploded in mid-air in Dharmarpuri province killing the test pilot.

== 1983 ==
9 January
One of two USAF McDonnell-Douglas F-4C Phantom IIs, call sign Juliet Lima 26, of the Michigan Air National Guard sent on a Special Military Instrument Intercept Clearance Mission to intercept a private Beechcraft D-55 Baron, registered N7142N, that strays into restricted ADIZ zone off the North Carolina coast, collides at 1641 hrs. EST, in poor visibility with light-twin piloted by Waynesboro, Virginia lawyer Henry H. Tiffany. The Phantom's port wing slicing through the Baron's fuselage and cabin, killing all seven on board. Although suffering damage to the port wing leading edge and loss of port wing tank assembly, the F-4C returns safely to Seymour-Johnson AFB near Goldsboro, North Carolina.

A Pentagon report, prepared by the National Guard Bureau of the Army and the Air Force, issued 18 May 1983, notes that Tiffany, 47, en route from vacation in the Bahamas to Norfolk, Virginia, had failed to adhere to his flight plan, and also failed to notify controllers when he entered the restricted air space 20 mi (32 km) South of MCAS Cherry Point, North Carolina. Phantom pilot, Capt. John A. Wellers, was found to have closed on the Beechcraft at higher than intended speed while doing radar search and was faulted for failure to maintain 500 ft (150 m) vertical separation, as per instructions. The report notes that the Aerospace Defense Command radar operators at Fort Lee, Virginia, gave Wellers incorrect altitude data about his target, and that personnel at the FAA's flight control center in Leesburg, Virginia and military controllers at Fort Lee "were slow to react or acted improperly in the process of identifying the unknown aircraft." Flamboyant lawyer Tiffany had been imprisoned for two months in 1978 after an aircraft he was piloting was forced down with engine trouble in Haiti with more than a ton of marijuana on board. U.S. drug authorities said later that Tiffany was implicated in a major Northern Virginia smuggling ring. In fact, on the fatal flight, Tiffany was by-passing his flight plan's required U.S. customs stop in Florida and was attempting a direct flight to Norfolk, said a National Transportation Safety Board report issued 23 August 1983.

27 January
Five maintenance airmen are killed and eight injured when a USAF Boeing B-52G-90-BW Stratofortress, 57-6507, c/n 464212, of the 319th Bomb Wing, catches fire due to an overheated fuel pump and explodes at 0930 hrs. on the ramp at Grand Forks AFB, North Dakota. The Stratofortress was undergoing routine fuel cell maintenance after flying a training mission the previous night.

11 April
A United States Air Force Boeing B-52 Stratofortress (B-52G-95-BW) registration number 58-0161, departed Robins Air Force Base in Houston County, Georgia at 0924 hours Eastern Time Zone, en route to Nellis Air Force Base to take part in advanced aerial combat training Exercise Red Flag. At 1220 hours Mountain Time Zone, the aircraft crashed into the south face of 7,050 foot Square Top Mountain at approximately the 6,800 foot level. All seven occupants aboard the aircraft were killed; Captain Donald W. Hiebert - Pilot, 1st Lieutenant Thomas C. Lennep Jr - Co-Pilot, Captain Jonathan M. Bishop - Radar Navigator, 1st Lieutenant Matthew W. Cervenak - Navigator, 1st Lieutenant Bernard S. Russell - Electronic Warfare Officer, Staff Sergeant Major Carter - Gunner, Colonel Caroll D. Gunther - Pilot/Safety Observer. The cause of the crash was attributed to navigational error. A monument to the victims has been erected at the crash site.

19 April
According to Japan Self-Defense Forces official confirmed report, two Kawasaki C-1 affiliated Japan Air Self-Defense Force transport plane were crush on Ōyama, Toba, Mie Prefecture, Japan, total 14 JASDF crew member were died.

26 April
According to a JSDF officially confirmed report, a Shin Meiwa PS-1 flying boat affiliated Japan Maritime Self-Defense Force plane, crashed on Iwakuni MCAS (present day of Iwakuni Kintaikyō Airport), during a training flight in Yamaguchi Prefecture, Japan, a total of 14 JMSDF members died.
28 April
A USAF LTV A-7D-11-CV Corsair II, 71-0361, of the 149th Tactical Fighter Squadron, of the Virginia Air National Guard, based at Richmond International Airport, crashed near Richmond, Virginia, shearing unoccupied house in half and setting second structure on fire. Pilot Capt. Robert Welch, 30, of Atlanta, Georgia, ejected just before impact, suffering a slight back injury.

30 April
Shortly after take-off from NAS Jacksonville, Florida, around noon, for a flight to Leeward Point Field at Guantanamo Bay Naval Base, Cuba, the port engine of a Navy Convair C-131F Samaritan, BuNo 141010, c/n 293, caught fire. The pilot radioed that he was returning to the base. As the aircraft was over the St. Johns River, ~1/4 mile from the runway and at ~200 feet altitude, the port wing separated from the aircraft. When the fuselage hit the water, the aircraft exploded, killing 14 of 15 on board. The sole survivor grabbed onto the first floating object she could reach: her own suitcase.

1 May
During air-to-air combat training over the Negev Desert, an Israeli Air Force McDonnell Douglas F-15 Eagle, 957, "Markia Schakim" (Hebrew: מרקיע שחקים, "Sky Blazer"), of 106 Squadron, collides with a Douglas A-4N Ayit, 374, at between 13 and 14 thousand feet altitude, causing the attack jet to explode (the pilot, last name Shraga, reportedly successfully ejected), and tearing off the starboard wing of the fighter ~2 feet outboard of the engine nacelle. Pilot Zivi Nedivi goes to afterburner to try to stop spinning aircraft, and unaware of the condition of the jet due to fuel leaks obscuring the extent of the damage, makes a blistering 250–260 knot landing at nearest air base at Ramon, tearing off the arrestor hook and coming to a stop just 20 feet from the runway threshold. Pilot later comments that had he known the true state of the aircraft, he and his weapons operator would have ejected. F-15 is reportedly repaired and returned to service in ~two months.

17 May
A U.S. Navy Lockheed P-3B-65-LO Orion, BuNo 152733, c/n 185–5173, of VP-1, makes a wheels-up landing at NAS Barbers Point, Hawaii, due to pilot error, ending a 14-year squadron record of over 101,000 hours of accident-free flying. Airframe struck off charge.
22 May
A Canadian Forces Lockheed CF-104 Starfighter, 104813, of 439 Sqn., explodes in mid-air during airshow performance at Rhein-Main Air Base, Frankfurt, Germany, wreckage falling onto parked cars in woods near the airport, setting several afire and killing three adults and two children watching the display, Reuters news service reported. A Canadian Forces spokesman said that the CF-104, flown by Capt. Alan J. Stephenson, 27, was in a formation of five Starfighters, and that he was to do a solo display. He had done two complete circuits and had leveled off for a low-speed fly-past when the aircraft malfunctioned. He ejected safely. The spokesman said that a board of inquiry has been convened to investigate the cause of the crash.

25 August
A Morehead City, North Carolina, woman died of burns on 26 August which she received when a USMC Grumman EA-6B Prowler, BuNo 160704, c/n P-67, 'CY-11', of VMAQ-2, US Marine Corps, crashed into the front porch of her neighbor's house on Thursday night, 25 August, after the aircraft caught fire and smoke in the cockpit forced the crew of four to eject, parachuting safely. Clara Belle Daniels, a 72-year-old widow, was working in her yard when the jet spiraled down, and received third degree burns from the impact. She was flown by military helicopter to the burn treatment center at Baptist Hospital in Winston-Salem, where she died the next day, said hospital spokesman Phyllis Teague. "Major Dennis K. Brooks, public affairs officer for the 2nd Marine Aircraft Wing at Cherry Point Marine Corps Air Station, identified the crewmen as 1st Lt. James M. Stevenson, 26, of Palos Verdes, Calif.; Capt. Gordon B. Habbestad, 28, Spokane, Wash.; Capt. James J. Cuff Jr., 33, Cherry Hill, N.J., and Capt. David F. Tomaino, 30, Needham, Mass. Brooks said Tomaino was the pilot and Stevenson was the injured crewman. Robert Bryden, a resident of the neighborhood at Shepard and 18th streets where the crash occurred, said a major catastrophe was avoided because the plane fell almost straight down. 'If the plane had just angled down, it would have taken the whole block with it, but it didn't,' Bryden said. 'The plane just stalled out up there and dropped like a rock to the ground.'"

1 September
A Boeing-Vertol UH-46 Sea Knight loses power on lift-off from the deck of Spruance-class destroyer USS Fife during her first deployment, strikes the NATO Sea Sparrow missile mount, leaving the stricken helicopter hanging over the ship's starboard side. Fife's damage control teams quickly lash the UH-46 in place and all 16 personnel are rescued without serious injury. After pulling into Singapore to crane off the damaged helicopter, the warship sails west to Diego Garcia to receive a new Sea Sparrow mount.

20 October
Japanese Air Self Defense Force McDonnell-Douglas F-15DJ Eagle, 12-8053, of the 202 Hikōtai, crashes into the Pacific Ocean 110 miles E of Nyutubaru Air Base, Japan, during low altitude night flying training.

28 October
Hawker Siddeley Harrier GR.1, XV742, one of four Harriers displayed at the 1968 SBAC show at Farnborough, then loaned to the U.S. Marine Corps for trials in 1971, returned to the RAF and converted to GR.3 standard in 1982, crashes this date on Holbeach range, UK, while serving with No. 233 OCU.

12 November
McDonnell-Douglas F-15A-16-MC Eagle, 76-076, c/n 0265/A228, of the 71st Tactical Fighter Squadron, 1st Tactical Fighter Wing, jumps chocks during an engine run at Langley AFB, Virginia, and collides with F-15, 76–071, c/n 0259/A223, of the same units. Both are repaired. 76-076 is later placed on display in park near DeBary, Florida, marked as 85-0125, in memory of an airman killed in the Khobar Towers terrorist bombing.

== 1984 ==
21 March

Two T-38 Talon Air Force trainer jets collide over south-east Franklin County, Alabama, during a training mission, killing 3 out of the 4 airmen aboard. The collision creates an explosion "louder than thunder" that can be heard from miles away. Captain Jefferson K. Dubel is the sole survivor, having ejected out of his aircraft after the collision. The wreckage is strewn across 2 square miles of land around Franklin County Road 79.:

A Hawk T1, XX251 with the RAF Red Arrows hit the ground during a practice opposition loop maneuver by the synchro pair at Akrotiri, Cyprus. The impact forced the ejection seat through the canopy and deployed the chute, dragging the pilot out. The aircraft broke up and caught fire. The pilot survived.

24 March
Sea Stallion carrying 18 U.S. and 11 South Korean Marines hit a mountainside in South Korea in early morning darkness March 24, 1984

4 April
The second Soviet Mikoyan MiG-31 Foxhound prototype, 832, crashed while on a test flight. Mikoyan Chief Test Pilot Maj. Gen. Aleksandr Fedotov and his navigator Valeriy Zaitsev were both killed.

26 April
United States Air Force Lt. Gen. Robert M. Bond (1929–1984), Vice Commander of Air Force Systems Command, is killed in a high-speed ejection from a Mikoyan-Gurevich MiG-23 of the 4477th Test and Evaluation Squadron, out of Groom Lake, Nevada at 1018 hrs., which was initially reported to be an F-117A Stealth fighter. The MiG impacted on Little Skull Mountain on the remote Nellis AFB range in a high-speed 60-degree dive. Following this accident, officers of General rank were prohibited from test flying. The Air Force is also forced to admit that it is flying Soviet bloc aircraft. This may have been a MiG that a Libyan pilot defected to Italy in during the early 1980s.

22 May
Lockheed U-2R, 68-10333, Article 055, fifth airframe of first R-model order, first flight 8 May 1968, registered N812X; delivered to the CIA, 28 May 1968. To 100th Strategic Reconnaissance Wing mid-1974. To 9th SRW in 1976. Damaged at Akrotiri, Cyprus, 24 April 1980 – repaired. Crashes this date at Osan Air Base, South Korea, pilot Capt. David Bonsi survives. Aircraft suffers tailpipe failure on climb-out at ~3,000 feet forcing an ejection. This was the first of three such tailpipe-related crashes.

24 May
United States Navy Lcdr. Daniel Joseph Harrington IV (born 1945), Pilot of VC-5, ejected safely from a Douglas TA-4J Skyhawk, BuNo. 158476, 'UE 15', of VC-5, out of Cubi Point, Philippines. Rear seat pilot Lt. Charles Richard Dickinson was killed on impact with water. The TA-4J impacted near Grande Island, Subic Bay, Philippines in the water. Catastrophic engine failure was found to be the cause.

June
United States Air Force 1st Lt. Kurt D. Schwindt and 2nd Lt. Craig R. Martelle were killed when their Cessna Skymaster O-2 Forward Control aircraft crashed at Travis Field near Savannah, Georgia, during the "Quick-Thrust" joint exercise. Investigators determined that a tail-flap linkage failure sent the aircraft nose-down into the trees near the airport.

12 July
USAF C-141B, 64-0624, assigned to the 701st Military Airlift Squadron at Charleston AFB, South Carolina, crashed after takeoff from NAS Sigonella in Sicily. All eight crew and one passenger were killed.

21 August
U.S. Navy LTV A-7E Corsair II, BuNo 157495, of attack squadron VA-56 Champions, suffers a fatal ramp strike on USS Midway, airframe splitting in two aft the wing with a resultant fireball as fuel cells rupture.

29 August
Second prototype Rockwell B-1A Lancer, 74-0159, of the Air Force Flight Test Center, Edwards AFB, California, crashes 22 miles NE of the base, in the desert E of Boron, California, when control is lost during an aft centre of gravity test. The flight commander, Rockwell test pilot Doug A. Benefield, is killed when escape pod parachutes fail to fully deploy, module impacting in a right nose low attitude. The Co-pilot and flight test engineer are badly injured.

30 August
A United States Navy North American T-2C Buckeye crashes into the Chesapeake Bay shortly after take-off from NAS Patuxent River, Maryland, killing the student and seriously injuring the instructor.

10 October
The first of three Northrop F-20 Tigersharks, 82-0062, c/n GG1001, N4416T, during a world sales tour, crashes at Suwon Air Base, South Korea, killing Northrop chief test pilot Darrell Cornell. During the last manoeuvre of the final demonstration flight at Suwon, the aircraft stalled at the top of an erratic vertical climb and dove into the ground from 1,800 feet. High-G pilot incapacitation was suspected as the cause, as the investigation found no evidence of airframe failure. In 1963 Cornell had been one of the 34 finalists for NASA Astronaut Group 3, but ultimately was not selected.

16 October
An unarmed USAF Boeing B-52G Stratofortress, 57‑6479, of the 92nd Bomb Wing out of Fairchild AFB, Washington, crashed about 2100 hrs. into a mesa on the Navajo reservation in northeastern Arizona 13 miles NE of Kayenta, during a low-level training flight. Eight crew eject and recovered in a day; one ejects, missing; gunner KWF.

25 October
A RAF Hawk T1, XX298, of 4 FTS out of RAF Valley, Wales, crashed over Tremadoc Bay after the flight controls seized up. Both Pilots ejected and survived.

== 1985 ==
1985
Sole Windecker YE-5A Eagle, 73-1653, c/n 009, crashes during classified military test by U.S. Army when it gets into a spin (which it was placarded against) and pilot bails out.

11 January
An unarmed U.S. Army Pershing II medium-range ballistic missile caught fire near Heilbronn, Germany during a routine training exercise, killing three American soldiers and injuring seven others. No nuclear weapons were involved in the accident.

22 January
U.S. Navy H-3 Helicopter crashes off the coast of NS Roosevelt Roads PR. 1 fatality.

9 February
An armed USAF Fairchild-Republic A-10A Thunderbolt II, 78-0723, crashed into a cliff in Oak Creek Canyon just north of Sedona, Arizona during a morning rainstorm. A military demolitions crew was sent in to recover unexploded munitions and the canyon was closed to traffic for several days. The lone pilot, attached to the 354th Tactical Fighter Wing at Myrtle Beach Air Force Base, South Carolina, was killed.

29 March
Two Canadian Forces Lockheed CC-130H Hercules, 130330 and 130331, both of 435 Squadron, crashed after having a mid-air collision over CFB Namao, near Edmonton, Alberta. This is the only dual Hercules mid-air.

3 April
First Kamov V-80-01, prototype of Kamov Ka-50 Hokum, '010', crashes, killing the pilot.

20 April
USAF North American CT-39 Sabreliner 62-4496 (c/n 276–49), suffering from defective brakes, runs off runway at Wilkes-Barre-Scranton International Airport, Pennsylvania, goes down 125-foot embankment, burns, killing all five on board, including General Jerome F. O'Malley, Commander of the United States Air Force's Tactical Air Command

14 May
Second of three Northrop F-20 Tigersharks, 82-0063, c/n GG1002, N3986B, during stopover at CFB Goose Bay, Labrador, en route to the Paris Air Show, crashes at 1350 hrs. Atlantic Daylight Time at the end of sixth practice flight of the day, in circumstances much like the loss of the first prototype on 10 October 1984. Hesitating in the inverted position at the top of a series of 9G vertical rolls, airframe dove erratically into the ground, coming down in an upright, wings-level, nose-up attitude on snow-covered ground, killing Northrop test pilot Dave Barnes. Again, G-induced pilot unconsciousness was suspected, investigation finding no sign of airframe failure.

27 June
An RAF Lockheed C-130K Hercules C.1P, XV206, of 1312 Flight, and a Royal Navy Westland Sea King HAS5, XZ919, helicopter of 826 Naval Air Squadron, collide in cloud north of the Falkland Islands, at around 300 ft. The Hercules lost the wing beyond its #1 (port outer) engine but still managed to land. The Sea King, based at RNAS Culdrose, was lost and all four on board killed.

13 July
Blue Angels Aircraft 5, BuNo 155029, and 6, BuNo 154992, (Douglas A-4F Skyhawk) collide at the top of a loop at 1532 hrs., Niagara Falls International Airport, New York, during the Western New York Air Show '85, killing Lt. Cmdr. Michael Gershon. Second pilot, Lt. Andy Caputi, ejects safely with only minor injuries. One Skyhawk crashed on airport grounds while the second fighter impacted in a nearby auto junkyard. The demonstration team resumes show duties 20 July at Dayton, Ohio but omits maneuver that resulted in crash, and flies with five aircraft rather than six.

8 August
A USAF LTV A-7D Corsair II, 69‑6198, of the 4450th Tactical Group, lost power, caught fire and crashed into Midwest City, a suburb of Oklahoma City, Oklahoma, pilot Maj. Dennis D. Nielson staying with aircraft as he attempted to steer it towards less-populous area before ejecting, but fighter impacted house, killing one, injuring one, one missing, said a United Press International report. Second victim found on 9 August. This unit was secretly operating Lockheed F-117 Nighthawks at this time.

8 August
A USAF General Dynamics F-16A Block 15F Fighting Falcon, 81-0750, of the 421st Tactical Fighter Squadron, crashed during a training mission in northwest Utah, killing the pilot. Crashed onto the Utah Test and Training Range killing pilot, First Lieutenant S. Brad Peale. The aircraft suffered a controlled flight into terrain (CFIT).

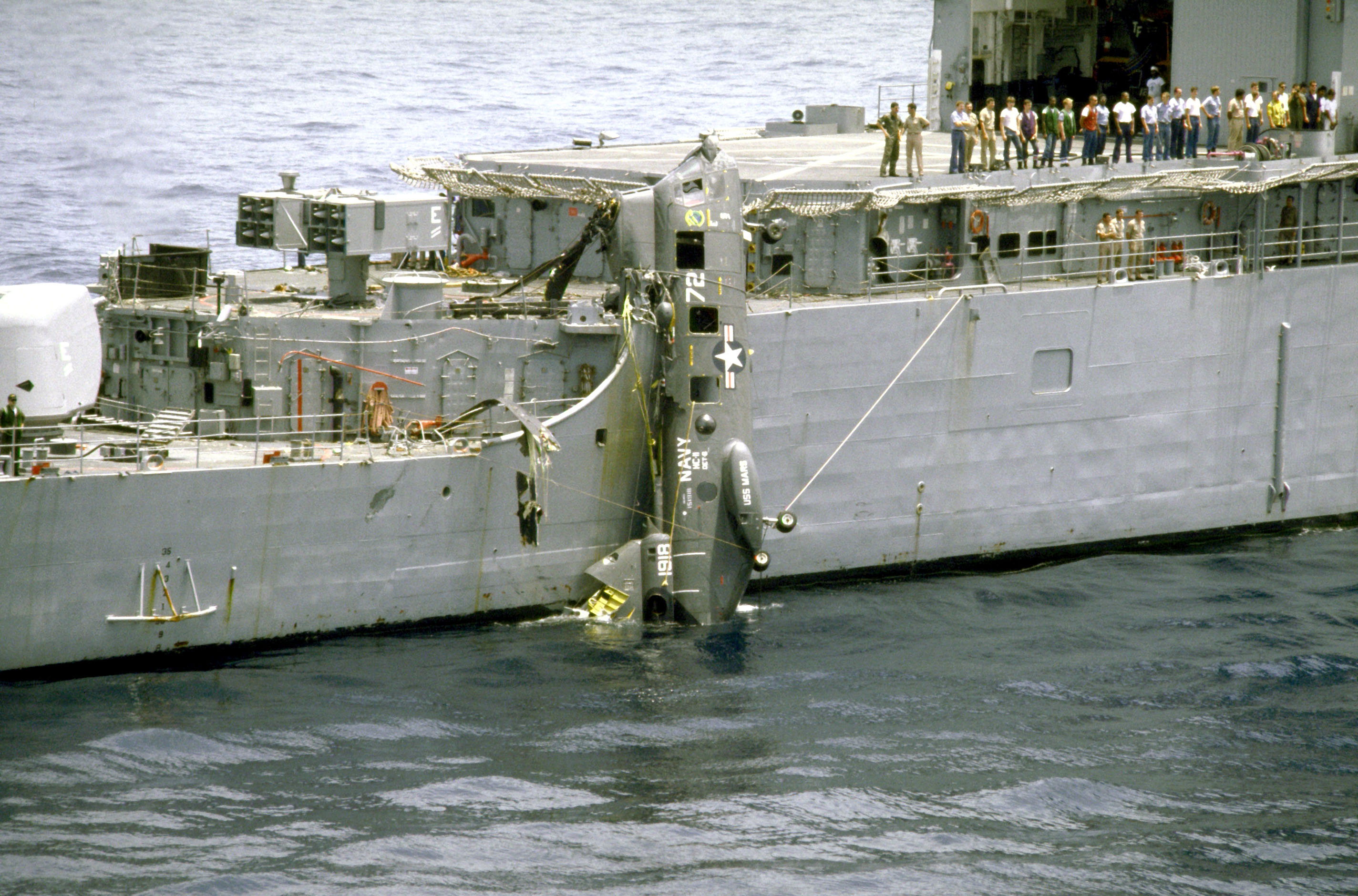
CH-46D of HC-11 after crashing on USS Fife (DD-991), 1985.

1 September
A U.S. Navy Boeing Vertol CH-46D Sea Knight, BuNo 151918, '72', crashed on takeoff due to an engine failure aboard the destroyer USS Fife (DD-991) in the Indian Ocean. The helicopter struck the Sea Sparrow launcher. Quick response of Fife´s damage control team extinguished the fires and secured the helicopter which was hanging from the side of the destroyer below the helicopter deck. All 16 crew and passengers aboard escaped without major injuries. The helicopter was assigned to Helicopter Combat Support Squadron 11 (HC-11) Det. 6 aboard the combat stores ship USS Mars (AFS-1).

15 September
A Texas Army National Guard AH-1G Cobra Tail number 67-15737 of D/1/124 CAV of 49th "Lone Star" Div. crashed shortly after take-off at 8:20 hrs NW of Camp Merrill US Army Ranger Tng Camp AAF near Dahlonega, GA. Initial contact with team aircraft was made then contact was lost in a mountainous and heavily treed area. Post crash investigation indicated N1 compressor section failure was the cause of the Class A Accident resulting in the loss of both pilot, 1LT Kevin M. Cardwell and co-pilot, 1LT Michael L. Pape Sr.

29 October
A USMC Douglas A-4M Skyhawk, BuNo 160242, of VMA-223, one of three en route from NAS Memphis, Tennessee, to MCAS Cherry Point, North Carolina, crashed S of Boiling Springs, South Carolina, 10 miles N of Spartanburg, at ~1800 hrs., leaving a crater estimated to be 15 feet deep and 35 to 45 feet across. The pilot, 1st Lt. Robin Franklin Helton, (13 September 1955 – 29 October 1985) was not immediately found and it was thought that he may have ejected. He did not, and died in the crash. "Official reports after the crash pointed to a failure in the plane's oxygen and communications system as a possible cause." On 29 October 2010, "Helton's family, including his widow Connie Helton Mastrangelo, daughter Robyn Helton (who was just 7 months old when her father died), parents Don and Kathryn Helton, and others also returned [to Boiling Springs] for a short memorial and to unveil a new monument that will alert all passers-by to the ultimate sacrifice by a young Marine, husband and father."

15 November
A U.S. Air Force Convair C-131H Samaritan, 54-2817, of VR-48, Naval Air Facility, Washington, D.C., crashes shortly after take-off from Napier Field, Dothan, Alabama, killing two pilots of the Navy's Fleet Logistic Support Squadron, Andrews AFB, Maryland, and a flight engineer, also of Andrews AFB.

26 November
Two airmen escaped injury when their U.S. Air Force T-37 jet trainer crashed several miles south of Bullards Bar Reservoir in rural Yuba County. The airmen lost control of the aircraft about 30 minutes into the routine training flight. The pilot, 2nd Lt Bruce D. Umland, 23, of Minneapolis and student-navigator 2nd Lt. Gregory Johnson, 22, of Duluth, Minnesota safely ejected from the plane before it crashed. The crash occurred on National Forest property about 12-1/2 miles north of Grass Valley, California (between Highway 49 and Marysville Rd) on a Tuesday morning. Observers aboard a helicopter from the 126th Medical Company of the Army National Guard at Mather AFB said the jet appeared to have hit the ground during a spin.

3 December
A U.S. Navy aviator is killed at Naval Air Station Miramar, California, when, upon landing at 0910 hrs. on a slick runway after a flight from NAS Point Mugu, California, his F/A-18A-15-MC Hornet (Lot 7), BuNo 162395, skids ~5,000 feet down the 12,000 foot runway, then overturns, trapping the pilot underneath the inverted airframe. Autopsy surgeons determined that the pilot died almost immediately after the crash from a severed spinal cord. Kleemann had nearly 4,000 flight hours, but fewer than 43 in the F/A-18. The Hornet was a nearly new airframe with only 327 flying hours being used in the operational testing of the design. Investigators pinpointed the planing link on the undercarriage whose task is to guide the gear components' complex manoeuvers during retraction as a probable cause. If damaged during retraction after departing Point Mugu, the link may have caused the starboard wheel to be slightly out of line. As the fighter's weight settled onto the gear leg, the airframe may have swerved so sharply that the pilot was unable to maintain control. Repaired, this airframe is struck off charge on 27 June 2007.

12 December
Arrow Air Flight 1285, a chartered Douglas DC-8-63CF, N950JW, crashes just after take-off from Gander, Newfoundland, Canada, killing 256 people, of whom 248 were soldiers in the United States Army 101st Airborne Division returning from overseas duty in the Sinai desert, Egypt. This remains the greatest peacetime loss of military personnel in US history.

16 December
McDonnell-Douglas F-15D-37-MC Eagle, 84-0042, c/n 0909/D050, of the 3246th Test Wing, Armament Development and Test Center, Eglin AFB, Florida, crashes in the Gulf of Mexico, 53 miles SE of Eglin. The Armament Division commander, Col. Timothy F. O'Keefe Jr., and Maj. Eugene F. Arnold, an instructor pilot with the 3247th Test Squadron at Eglin, eject safely.

== 1986 ==
2 January
A McDonnell Douglas F-15C-28-MC Eagle (s/n 80-0037; c/n 0692/C186) from the 57th FIS based at NAS Keflavik, Iceland, crashed into the northern Atlantic Ocean off the southeastern coast of Iceland. The pilot, Capt Steve Nelson, was killed when his aircraft struck the water at high speed after failing to safely complete a "split-S" maneuver during a low-altitude step-down training (LASDT) sortie. The instructor had planned the maneuver based on his own previous experience in training weapons school students at Nellis AFB in comparatively lightweight F-15As; however, the F-15C, with nearly full CFTs, was much heavier and could not physically complete the split-S despite starting the maneuver at 10,000'. The aircraft was never recovered.

28 January
The first United States multiple in-flight spaceflight fatalities. The Space Shuttle Challenger, OV-099, is destroyed 73 seconds after lift-off on STS-51-L. Analysis of the accident showed that a faulty O-ring seal had allowed hot gases from the shuttle solid rocket booster (SRB) to weaken the external propellant tank, and also the strut that held the booster to the tank. The tank aft region failed, causing it to begin disintegrating. The SRB strut also failed, causing the SRB to rotate inward and expedite tank breakup. Challenger was thrown sideways into the Mach 1.8 (2,000 km/h; 1,200 mph) windstream causing it to break up in midair with the loss of all seven crew members aboard: Greg Jarvis, Christa McAuliffe, Ronald McNair, Ellison Onizuka, Judith Resnik, Michael J. Smith, and Dick Scobee. NASA investigators determined they may have survived during the spacecraft disintegration, while possibly unconscious from hypoxia; at least some of them tried to protect themselves by activating their emergency oxygen. Any survivors of the breakup were killed, however, when the largely intact cockpit hit the water at 200 mph (320 km/h). See Space Shuttle Challenger disaster.

12 February
A USAF General Dynamics F-16A Block 5 Fighting Falcon, 78-0055, flown by a pilot of the 3247th Test Squadron, 3246th Test Wing, disappears from Eglin Air Force Base's radar tracking screens at 1230 hrs., crashing in the Gulf of Mexico roughly 30 mi (48 km) south of Okaloosa Island, Fort Walton Beach, Florida. The body of the pilot, Capt. Lawrence E. Lee, 31, of Kokomo, Indiana, is retrieved from the water by two rescue jumpers from a Sikorsky UH-60 Blackhawk at 1350 hrs., said Eglin public affairs officer Lt. Col. Bill Campbell. A parachute is found floating nearby. The pilot is thought to have drowned after ejecting from the fighter. "There were no radio transmissions ... nothing to indicate there were any problems", said Campbell. "We found no wreckage, so we can't be sure at this time what caused the crash. I don't know if we'll ever know for sure." Hypothermia may have been a factor in the pilot's death. The Gulf's water temperature averaged between 55 and 58 degrees Fahrenheit on Wednesday. Lee was performing what was to have been the aircraft's last test flight before it was returned to the Tactical Air Command. The F-16 had been modified for use in weapons tests by Eglin's Armament Division, then restored to its original condition. Campbell stated that he expects the Air Force will try to recover the wreckage to examine it for clues into the accident, although he acknowledged that such a crash "doesn't always leave much evidence." Lee is survived by his wife, Maj. Terri Lee, assigned to Eglin's 33rd Tactical Fighter Wing. A memorial service is held at 1 p.m. on 14 February in Eglin Base Chapel No. 2.

2 April
A T-38A-70 Talon jet trainer 67–14836, with a crew of two, student pilot Capt. Michael John Murphy, 26, of Biloxi, Mississippi and Instructor Pilot 2nd Lt. William David Eberz, 23, of Shohola, Pennsylvania. Both crew members were assigned to the 97th Flying Training Squadron of the 82nd Flying Training Wing at Williams Air Force Base Arizona. The aircraft crashed while on a low-level training flight when it impacted the very steep terrain 800 ft (240 m) below the peak of 7,903 ft (2,409 m) MSL Mazatzal Peak at 495 KIAS under controlled flight in instrument meteorological conditions. Both crew members were killed instantly. No attempts to eject were made. The crew had been flying a visual training route when they encountered a rapidly lowering cloud ceiling and apparently lost situational awareness and failed to clear the ascending terrain. Poor weather conditions prevented locating the wreckage until the next day.

7 May
Capt. Håkan Lundqvist is forced to eject from Saab Draken, 131, of F10 Wing of the Svenska Flygvapnet during an air defence sortie at low level in J2 sector outside the west coast of Sweden when he inadvertently flies through his wingman's vortices and goes into a superstall. Time from ejection until the fighter strikes the water is only 3 to 5 seconds. Pilot, suffering from spinal compression due to the ejection, is rescued by a ferry and then transferred to an F10 Wing helicopter.

22 May
The US Navy Grumman A-6E Intruder, BuNo 162181, c/n I-674, of VA-65, bound for USS John F. Kennedy at Puerto Rico, crashed on take-off from NAS Oceana, Virginia Beach, Virginia, at 1105 hrs., killing two crew and one motorist on Oceana Boulevard. The aircraft had no munitions but carried a full fuel load and burst into flame as it came down just outside the station perimeter, killing pilot Lt. James P. Hoban, 26, of River Vale, New Jersey, and bombardier-navigator Lt. Michael F. Wilson, 27, of Medford, New Jersey, as well as Navy wife Tammy Fowler, 25, of Virginia Beach, in the vehicle on Oceana Boulevard. Navy officials said that this was the first Navy aircraft crash in the area in more than two years. Witnesses reported that the Intruder's tail appeared to be on fire as it came down.

17 June
Boeing KC-135 Stratotanker, 63-7983, c/n 18600, 305th Air Refueling Wing, Det. 1, TDY, hit the runway at Howard AB, Panama, becomes airborne again and then crashed into a hill in the jungle.

1 or 3 July
T-38 Talon, Reese AFB TX USAFA Female Instructor Pilot died when she commanded a go around and her male student overrode her decision. She bailed out but her chute was caught in the rolling aircraft where she died. The male student survived with a broken ankle.

10 July
Two Luftforsvaret F-16A Fighting Falcons collided over the Nellis Range. Fokker-built F-16A Block 15M, 80-3684/684, c/n 6K-56, crashed at Rachel, Nevada, while Fokker-built F-16A Block 15M, 80-3686/686, c/n 6K-58, returned to Nellis AFB. The pilot of 684 ejected safely.

14 August
A Lockheed C-130 Hercules of the Honduran Air Force crashed in a jungle area after a failed landing at Mocorón Airport, in the east of the country. All 52 people on board were killed.

2 September
Schweizer RG-8A, 85-0048, c/n 4, ex-civil registration N3623C, modified Schweizer SGS 2-32 motor glider for U.S. Army Grisly Hunter reconnaissance project. Crashed at Ft. Huachuca, Arizona, killing two-man crew.

19 October
República de Moçambique Tupolev Tu-134A-3, C9-CAA, c/n 63457, with crew of nine and 35 passengers, crashed on approach at 2121 hrs. to Maputo International Airport (MPM/FQMA), Mozambique, after a flight from Mbala Airport (MMQ), Zambia, killing eight crew and 26 passengers, including Mozambique President Samora Machel, who had attended a meeting of African leaders in Zambia. While approaching Maputo, an inadvertent selection of the MATSAPA VOR frequency caused the crew to execute a premature 37-degrees turn. Although the pilot queried the turn, no effort was made to verify it by using the available navigational aids. The aircraft descended below the 3,000 ft (910 m) limit in spite of not having visual contact with Maputo. The crew erroneously assumed a power failure at Maputo. A 32-second GPWS warning was ignored and the aircraft collided with the ground at 2,187 ft (667 m), bounced and crashed into an uphill slope. The aircraft broke up, slid across the South African/Swaziland border and caught fire.

2 November
U.S. Coast Guard Sikorsky HH-3F Pelican 1473, c/n 61-635, out of CGAS Kodiak, on medical evacuation mission, strikes a high cliff and fell to the beach below on Ugak Island, off Kodiak, Alaska. The aircraft burned. KWF were LT Michael Clement Dollahite (CG Aviator #2148), LT Robert L. Carson Jr., CDR David Meurice Rockmore, USPHS, ASM2 Kevin M. McCraken, AT3 William G. Kemp, HS3 Ralph D. King.

5 December

A-6E Intruder BuNo. 160994/'NJ-809' of VA-128, NAS Whidbey Island, Washington: Destroyed when crashed December 15, 1986, 10 miles south of the Boardman Navy Range, which is 5.5 miles South West of Boardman, Morrow County, Oregon. Both crew - Lt Commander Dave Vaughn (Pilot) and Lt (JG) Gary Abe (Bombardier/Navigator) - were killed.

== 1987 ==
14 January
1402 MAS, Det 4, Eglin AFB, Florida, USAF C-21A, crashed in Montgomery, AL, during a routine training mission. Aircraft departed Eglin AFB and flew to Maxwell AFB in Montgomery, AL, to pick up parts. Then departed Maxwell AFB to neighboring Montgomery airport for transition work in the pattern. Crash resulted in total loss of aircraft and two of the three pilots.

12 February
NAF El Centro, California. Blue Angel F-18 crashes five miles (8.0 km) south of Brawley California. Pilot safely ejected.

27 February
Royal Air Force Boeing Chinook HC.1 ZA721 crashed in the Falkland Islands, all seven on board killed.

March
Douglas A-4 Skyhawk crashed in desert near Fallon, Nevada, during a dog fight. Aileron on wing bent, began to spin the aircraft uncontrollably. Patrick Paris survived with a scratch on his nose, picked up by helicopter later that day. Had been assumed dead on impact until wingman saw movement on ground six miles (9.7 km) from wreckage.

13 March
Japanese Air Self Defense Force Mitsubishi F-15J, 42-8840, of the 204 Hikōtai, crashes into the sea 100 miles (160 km) east of Hyakuri Air Base, Japan, following suspected spatial disorientation. Pilot KWF.

21 March
Dean Martin's son, Dean Paul Martin (formerly Dino of the 1960s "teeny-bopper" rock group Dino, Desi & Billy), died when his McDonnell Douglas F-4C-25-MC Phantom II fighter, 64-0923, of the 196th Tactical Fighter Squadron, 184th Tactical Fighter Wing, crashed into San Gorgonio Mountain in the San Bernardino Mountains after takeoff from March Air Force Base, during a snow storm while flying with the California Air National Guard. His Weapon Systems Officer (WSO), Ramon Ortiz is also KWF. Wreckage found four days later just below summit.

22 April
Two United States Air Force Northrop T-38 Talon supersonic jet trainers were destroyed in a mid-air collision that occurred during a training mission near Alamogordo, New Mexico. The aircraft were assigned to the 479th Tactical Training Wing out of Holloman Air Force Base. Killed were pilot instructor Captain Ross Alan LaTorra and his student Captain Paul J. Roberge. The pilot of the second aircraft, 2nd Lieutenant Stephen S. Fasbinder, ejected and survived with injuries including a broken left arm.

Video of A-6E crash (no audio)

12 May
Grumman A-6E Intruder, BuNo 155657, of VA-142, misses trap on USS Lexington, both crew eject as jet leaves deck, lightened airframe climbs away, even on reduced power, to crash in the Gulf of Mexico roughly 50 miles (80 km) south of NAS Pensacola, Florida. This was the second-to-last flight accident involving Lexington before the ship's retirement.

22 May
McDonnell Douglas F-4 Phantom II of the 301st TFW crashed into Lake Worth on approach to Carswell AFB following a training mission at Fort Sill, Oklahoma. Pilot was killed. WSO ejected and was critically injured.

5 June
US Marine Corps AV-8B-4 Harrier II, BuNo. 162073, of VMA-331, crashes into Barnegat Bay, New Jersey, when the engine flames out.

24 June
RAF SEPECAT Jaguar GR.1A, XZ386, '05', of 226 OCU, suffered a loss of control/controlled flight into terrain three miles (5 km.) SE of Builth Wells, Powys, Wales. Pilot KWF.

24 July
Two General Dynamics F-16 Fighting Falcons assigned to the 57th Wing of the USAF Weapons School collided in midair near Indian Springs, Nevada. The pilot of F-16A (80-0597), Major Michael J. Lotti, was killed on impact. The pilot of the second aircraft, Captain Alexander Michael Rupp, was killed while attempting an emergency landing at Creech Air Force Base. Captain Rupp's father, Major Alexander Kratz Rupp, was killed in an air accident while piloting a Convair F-102 Delta Dagger in the vicinity of Buford, Ohio on 11 June 1965.

17 September
McDonnell-Douglas KC-10A Extender, 82-0190, c/n 48212, written off in ramp fire after explosion while undergoing maintenance at Barksdale AFB, Louisiana, killing crew chief.

22 September
A U.S. Navy Grumman F-14A-70-GR Tomcat, BuNo 162707, of VF-74 out of NAS Oceana, Virginia Beach, Virginia, operating from USS Saratoga, accidentally shoots down a USAF RF-4C-22-MC Phantom II, 69-0381, 'ZR' tailcode, of the 26th Tactical Reconnaissance Wing, out of Zweibrücken Air Base, West Germany, at 1550 hrs. EDT over the Mediterranean during a NATO exercise, DISPLAY DETERMINATION. Both RF-4C crew eject, pilot Capt. Michael Ross of Portsmouth, Ohio, and WSO Lt. Randy Sprouse of Sumter, South Carolina, both of the 38th TRS, and are rescued by a helicopter from Saratoga within 30 minutes, suffering numerous injuries. A Navy spokesman said that the F-14 downed the RF-4C with an air-to-air missile. Recovery of the F-14 aboard Saratoga makes it obvious the missile was an AIM-9 Sidewinder. When told by the Saratoga's Admiral that they had been shot down, Sprouse remarks "I thought we were supposed to be on the same side?" to which the Admiral replies "We're sorry about this, but most of the time we are." The Tomcat pilot is duly disciplined and permanently removed from flying status.

28 September
A USAF B-1B Lancer, 84-0052, c/n 12, of the 7th Bomb Wing, Dyess AFB, Texas, crashes near La Junta, Colorado, following impact with an American white pelican. Three crew members eject safely, one killed due to an ejection seat malfunction. Two additional crew members die due to lack of time and proper flight conditions to accomplish manual bailout. Aircraft destroyed on impact. The Air Force disclosed on 28 September "that the survivors of the crash were Capt. Joseph S. Butler, 33 years old, of Rocky Mount, North Carolina, a student defensive officer; Capt. Lawrence H. Haskell, 33, of Harrisburg, Pennsylvania., a student aircraft commander, and Maj. William H. Price, 42, of Yuma, Arizona, an instructor in offensive systems. They were said to be in good condition. The three who were killed were Maj. James T. Acklin, 37, of Champaign, Illinois, an instructor pilot, First Lieut. Ricky M. Bean, 27, of Farmington, Maine, a student pilot, and Maj, Wayne D. Whitlock, 39, of Johnson City, Tennessee, an instructor in defensive systems."

2 October
A USAF McDonnell Douglas F-15 Eagle of the 48th Fighter-Interceptor Squadron crashed in or near the Apalachicola National Forest, 50 miles (80 km) southeast of Tyndall AFB where the plane departed. The pilot ejected safely and was rescued by helicopter.

14 October
A Lockheed F-117A Nighthawk, 83-815, of the 4450th Tactical Group, piloted by Maj. Michael C. Stewart, callsign BURNR ("burner") 54, crashed at 2033 hrs., approximately 100 miles (160 km) north of Nellis AFB, just east of Tonopah. Stewart was just 40 minutes into a routine single-ship sortie when his aircraft crashed into the gently sloping terrain 60 mi (97 km) east of Alamo, Nevada, pilot KWF. Cause is thought to be spatial disorientation – pilot made no attempt to eject.

20 October
USAF LTV A-7D-4-CV Corsair II, 69-6207, of the 4450th Tactical Group, Nellis AFB, Nevada, loses all power 15 miles S of Indianapolis, Indiana, at 31,000 feet while en route from Pittsburgh, Pennsylvania, to Tinker AFB, Oklahoma. Pilot tries to dead-stick into Indianapolis International Airport but receives poor direction from air traffic controllers and crashes at ~0915 hrs. during late turn after aiming aircraft at a baseball field but fighter veers, striking bank branch roof and hitting center of Ramada Inn across the street, killing nine employees, injuring five others (one of whom died later as a result of the injuries sustained). Pilot Maj. Bruce L. Teagarden, 35, ejected, suffering bruises and muscle strain. He lands in parking lot of Ace Supply Company, four blocks from the hotel. Air Force pays out $50,427 in property claims damages, according to The New York Times on 26 October. This A-7D was part of the unit then secretly operating Lockheed F-117A Nighthawk stealth aircraft but this was successfully kept out of the media for several years.

19 November
EA-6B Prowler BoNo. 162226/NF-606 of VAQ-136, US Navy. Missing on operations November 19, 1987: Loss occurred during a night Emcon departure from USS Midway while rounding the tip of India heading into the North Arabian Sea. Cause of the accident was unknown. Search by helicopters that night and fixed wing aircraft the next day found no trace of wreckage or the four crew. All four crew were killed – LT John Carter (pilot), Commander Justin (Noel) Greene (Commanding Officer of VAQ-136) Lt Doug Hora and Lt Dave Gibson – were all posted initially as "missing". This was later changed to KIAS/lost at sea (body not recovered). The landing was to be Commander Greene's 1000th trap, so there was cake awaiting in the ready room.

== 1988 ==
10 February
The pilot of a General Dynamics F-16A Block 15J Fighting Falcon, 82-0909, c/n 61–0502, ejects safely when his aircraft catches fire and crashes on take-off at Moody Air Force Base in south Georgia. Problems occurred during a routine practice flight. Witnesses said the aircraft climbed straight into the air during take-off and exploded into flames before hitting the ground. The aircraft was assigned to Moody.

11 February
USMC McDonnell-Douglas AV-8B-4 Harrier II, BuNo 162071, c/n 512020/20, of VMA-331, crashes at Nellis AFB, Nevada, following an engine flame-out. Note: another source gives this crash date as 11 February 1998.

25 February
A US Army Boeing-Vertol CH-47D Chinook helicopter, 86-01643, of 2nd Platoon, Company A, 2nd Battalion, 158th Aviation Regiment, 47th Hospital, 214th Field Artillery Brigade, 3rd Corps, Forces Command (FORSCOM), located at Fort Sill, Oklahoma, crashes outside Chico, Texas, killing ten soldiers and injuring eight, most with burns. The helicopter caught fire mid-flight due to the failure and disintegration of the number two transmission and driveshaft, and the pilots attempted an emergency landing, but the billowing smoke and passenger movements made it impossible. The helicopter hit the ground at 150 mph (240 km/h), breaking apart in a sheet of fire. This was originally the first B-model Chinook, 66-19121, which was converted in 1986 to D-model status.

7 March
A Northrop F-5E Tiger II crashes on take-off from Tyndall Air Force Base near Panama City, Florida. Lt. Col Charles Lemire of Mesa, Arizona, died in the crash. The aircraft had made a stop at the base before resuming a cross-country training mission. The F-5E was cleared for takeoff on the northern runway as part of a 4 ship departure, the ground controller saw flames coming out of the aircraft near the centerline tank and notified the tower crew, which was dismissed by the SOF as the afterburner. Upon rotation, the flames could clearly be seen as not being the afterburner at midfield. At this point the SOF radioed "Eject, Eject, Eject", The pilot ejected at midfield at about 500–800 ft, but the aircraft was not high enough for the pilot to separate from the ejection seat or parachute to open. The pilot was killed when he and the ejection seat hit the runway. the jet continued to fly then started a bank to the right and descended into a wooded area to the north side of the runway. The pilot and aircraft were assigned to a squadron at Williams Air Force Base near Phoenix, Arizona. The squadron is part of the 405th Tactical Training Wing at Luke Air Force Base near Phoenix.

8 March
Two Sikorsky UH-60 Blackhawk helicopters from Fort Campbell, Kentucky, collide on a night training mission. They were flying at 92 mph (148 km/h) air speed and about 250 feet (76 m) from the ground when they collided a Fort Campbell spokesman said. The Army identified three of the dead as Staff Sgt. Charles L. Shirley, 21, of Arkansas; Sgt. Dennis Sabot, 28, of Iowa; and Spec. 4 Samuel A. Hintz, 23, of Ohio, all from the 2nd Battalion, 502nd Infantry. A total of 17 soldiers were killed in the crash.

11 April
USAF RF-4C Phantom II (67-0431) crashed into a warehouse complex just north of Bergstrom AFB, in Austin, Texas. The jet was returning from a low-level training mission when the crash occurred about 12:15 p.m. Both crew members ejected and parachuted safely to the ground. The crew members were identified as Col. Roger L. Grimsley, 47, from Leesburg, Ohio, the pilot. Capt. Terence C. Ganiko, 30, of Honolulu, Hawaii, was the weapon systems officer.

24 April
Marine Corps Colonel Jerry Cadick, then commanding officer of MAG-11, was performing stunts at the MCAS El Toro Air Show. California, before a crowd of 300,000 when he crashes his McDonnell-Douglas F/A-18 Hornet at the bottom of a loop that was too close to the ground. The aircraft was in a nose-high attitude, but still carrying too much energy toward the ground when it impacted at more than 300 mph (480 km/h). Col. Cadick was subjected to extremely high G forces that resulted in his face making contact with the control stick and sustaining serious injury. He broke his arm, elbow and ribs, exploded a vertebra and collapsed a lung. Col. Cadick survived and retired from the Marine Corps. The F/A-18 remained largely intact but was beyond repair.

6 May
Royal Air Force Boeing Chinook HC.1 ZA672 hits a pier at Hanover Airport while taxiing and was destroyed, Three crew killed.

13 May
A USAF RF-4C Phantom II assigned to Bergstrom Air Force Base crashed northwest of Winslow, Arizona during a routine training mission from Davis-Monthan AFB to Nellis AFB, killing both pilots.

11 June
U.S. Navy Lockheed S-3A Viking, BuNo 160164 aircraft crashes immediately after launching. The aircraft rolled to the left and the aircrew ejected. The pilot, COTAC (NFO in co-pilot's seat) and Senso were killed. The Tacco survived with minor injuries. This occurred during transit between the Philippines and Hong Kong aboard USS Enterprise. Pilot Charles Roy experienced catastrophic aileron connecting rod failure immediately after catapult causing the aircraft to roll. COTAC was VS-21 Commanding Officer, CDR Robert A. Anderson; junior pilot in squadron. Pilot's body never found/recovered.

8 June
USAF C-130E, 61-2373, call sign "Demon 51", on a routine C-130 training mission to Greenville, Mississippi, crashes near the Greenville airport after practicing touch-and-go landings, killing all six crew members, Maj. Andy Zwaan, a 189 AW instructor pilot; 2nd Lt. Mark Brandt, a Missouri Air National Guard student pilot; 2nd Lt. Thomas Leece, an Air Force Reserve student pilot from Minnesota; Master Sgt. Ed Smith Jr., a 189 AW instructor flight engineer; Master Sgt. Danny Holland, a 189 AW instructor loadmaster; and Staff Sgt. David Bingham, a Texas Air National Guard student flight engineer.

9 June
U.S. Army Bell UH-1H, 68-15387, of the 193rd Aviation Company, 56th Field Artillery Command, strikes a power line during low visibility conditions and crashes near Hittistetten, Senden, West Germany, killing three soldiers.

12 July
U.S. Navy North American CT-39E Sabreliner, BuNo 158381, c/n 282–93, ex-N4701N, en route from Singapore to Subic Bay Naval Station, Philippines, comes down in the afternoon in the South China Sea near the Spratly Island archipelago, after radioing a distress signal of equipment failure. Vietnamese Navy ship (described by Joe Baugher as a fishing vessel) picks up three American crew, two men and one woman, said a spokesman at the Vietnamese embassy in Bangkok on 15 July, and took them to Vietnam where they were being "treated very kindly". Arrangements would be made to repatriate the crew. At this time the United States and Vietnam had not yet reestablished diplomatic relations.

13 July
US Marine Corps McDonnell-Douglas AV-8B-3 Harrier II, BuNo 161582, c/n 512014/14, of VMAT-203, crashed at MCAS Cherry Point, North Carolina.

10 August
US Navy Kaman SH-2F Seasprite, BuNo 161910, assigned to HSL-35 NAS North Island, suffers tail structure failure and loss of directional control and crashes into ocean approximately 30 miles (48 km) off Point Loma while returning from weapons training exercise at NALF San Clemente Island. Co-pilot (Lt. Walt Hogan) dies in the crash; the other three crewmembers survive.

17 August
A PAF Lockheed C-130B Hercules, 23494, 'R' (ex-USAF 62-3494), c/n 3708, callsign "Pak-1", crashes near the Pakistani town of Bahawalpur, killing everyone aboard, including the President of Pakistan General Muhammad Zia-ul-Haq, American Ambassador to Pakistan Arnold Lewis Raphel, Head of Pakistan's military intelligence General Akther Abdul Rehman and nearly all of the senior officers of the Pakistan Army.

18 August
Aleksandr V. Shchukin, a test pilot for the eventually scrapped Buran shuttle program, is killed when his Sukhoi Su-26M crashes on this date.

28 August
Three of the ten Aermacchi MB-339PAN jets from the Italian Air Force display team Frecce Tricolori collide in mid-air in front of the audience while performing their 'pierced heart' formation. One aircraft crashes directly into the crowd. Sixty-seven spectators and all three pilots were killed and 346 seriously injured in the resulting explosion and fire.

12 September
A Grumman F-14A-95-GR Tomcat, BuNo 160409, of VF-143, (also reported as VF-124) suffers total hydraulic system failure and crashes inverted into a hangar at Gillespie Field, a civil airport in El Cajon, California, San Diego County while attempting to return to NAS Miramar. The pilot, Lt. Cmdr. Jim Barnett, 36, a flight instructor with ten years of experience flying F-14s, managed to point the crippled jet towards the landing strip at Gillespie Field to reduce civilian casualties, and both he and his backseater, Lt. (j.g.) Randy L. Furtado, 27, a radar intercept officer who was undergoing training, ejected, suffering injuries. The RIO landed in power lines and suffered a fatal broken neck. The crash injured three on the ground and destroyed or damaged 19 aircraft and 13 vehicles.

11 October
Boeing KC-135A-BN refueling tanker, 60-0317, c/n 18092, crashes on landing at Wurtsmith AFB, Michigan; aircraft was destroyed and six of 17 on board are killed.

25 October
Two United States Marine Corps Helicopters collide and explode in the Arizona desert, resulting in the deaths of all 10 servicemen aboard. The helicopters involved were a Boeing Vertol CH-46 Sea Knight and a Bell UH-1N Twin Huey. The collision occurred at the Barry M. Goldwater Air Force Range at 1925 hours Pacific Time Zone, approximately 125 miles (201 km) southeast of Yuma, Arizona.

18 November
B-1B Lancer strategic bomber, 85-0076, crashes on landing at Ellsworth AFB, South Dakota; aircraft is destroyed but all four crew members survive.

5 December
A U.S. Navy Grumman EA-6B Prowler, BuNo 163044, 'NG', of VAQ-139, goes missing over the Pacific Ocean during training exercise 900 miles (1,400 km) off San Diego. Search fails to find any sign of the four crew.

6 December
A USAF Boeing B-52H-150-BW Stratofortress, 60-0040, crashes on the runway at 0115 hrs. EST at K.I. Sawyer AFB, Michigan, while doing touch-and-goes after a seven-hour training flight. No weapons were aboard the bomber, which broke into three parts. All crew survived, crawling or being helped from the nose section, without sustaining burns.

8 December

A USAF Fairchild-Republic A-10 Thunderbolt II crashes at the then-West German town of Remscheid. The pilot and five residents were killed, and a further 50 people injured.

11 December
Soviet Air Force Ilyushin Il-76M CCCP-86732, c/n 083413388, crashes into the side of a mountain while on approach to Leninakan (now Gyumri), killing 77 of 78 on board. The altimeter was set to 734 mm Hg instead of 634 mm Hg, causing the altimeter to read 1,100 m (3,600 ft) than the actual altitude. Crew fatigue was also a factor. The aircraft was part of air relief efforts following the Armenian earthquake.

== 1989 ==
3 January
Oregon Air National Guard McDonnell-Douglas F-4C Phantom II, 63-7626 (?), of 123rd FIS/Oregon ANG from Portland, Oregon, crashes on a training mission approximately 30 miles (48 km) off Tillamook Bay, injuring both crew, who were plucked from the Pacific Ocean, authorities said.

4 January
A female U.S. Navy airman of VA-42 is struck and killed by a Grumman A-6 Intruder being towed from a hangar at NAS Oceana, Virginia Beach, Virginia. The airman, whose name was withheld pending notification of family, was walking beside a wing of the attack bomber as it was being towed by a small tractor from the hangar to the flight-line, a Navy spokesman said.

4 January
The Second Gulf of Sidra incident occurs when two USN Grumman F-14 Tomcats shoot down two Libyan Air Force MiG-23s.

29 January
A RCAF Lockheed CC-130E Hercules, 130318, formerly 10318, c/n 4124, of 435 Squadron, participating in annual Brim Frost exercises, strikes the runway approach lights and a river bank short of the runway and crashes onto the runway at 6:47pm local time at Wainwright AAF, Alaska in ice fog at −51 °F (−46 °C). Nine of the eighteen occupants were killed.

2 February
The first prototype JAS 39 Gripen crashes on its sixth flight when landing in Linköping as a result of pilot-induced oscillation. The accident was filmed by a crew from Sveriges Television's Aktuellt. The pilot remained in the tumbling aircraft, and escaped miraculously with just a fractured arm.

20 February
USAF C-141B, 66-0150, of the 63d MAW, Norton AFB, California, crashed while attempting to land at Hurlburt Field, Florida. All seven crew and one passenger were killed.

12 March
USAF [[CH-3E] [tail number 65-05692]], crash about 20 miles northwest of Tucson, Arizona, entire Air Force Reserve crew of 4 and the 11 member Army Special Forces Team killed, usafrotorheads.com

13 April
Two U.S. Navy North American T-2C Buckeyes, BuNos. 156694, 'A 994' and 159724, 'A 996' of VT-19, collide in mid-air and crash near Macon, Mississippi, killing two crew of one, but two crew of the other parachuted safely.

20 April
Doru Davidovici, Romanian writer and pilot, loses his life, together with Dumitru Petra, when their MiG-21UM trainer crashed during landing procedures while returning home to Borcea Air Base, Borcea-Fetești, from a training flight.

21 April
Lockheed SR-71A, 61-7974, Article 2025, outbound on operational sortie from Kadena Air Base, Okinawa, suffers an engine explosion and total hydraulic failure. Pilot Maj. Dan E. House and RSO Capt. Blair L. Bozek both eject safely. This was the final Blackbird loss before the type was withdrawn from service.

1 May
A Tyndall Air Force Base McDonnell-Douglas F-15 Eagle crashes in the Gulf of Mexico about 65 miles (105 km) southeast of Tyndall, killing the student pilot who was identified as 2nd Lt. Sean P. Murphy, 23, of Warsaw, Indiana. At the time of the crash the pilot was engaged in a mock dogfight with his instructor who was flying a second F-15. The pilot was assigned to Tyndall's 95th Tactical Fighter Training Squadron.

15 May
The US Navy North American CT-39E Sabreliner, BuNo 158383, 'JK', of VRC-40, NAS Norfolk, Virginia, runs off the runway at Andrews AFB, Maryland, at 1100 hrs. The crew of four and one passenger were uninjured.

4 July

A "runaway" Soviet Mikoyan-Gurevich MiG-23M (Flogger-B), bort number 29, crashes into a farmhouse in Belgium, killing an 18-year-old man.

6 July
One of two McDonnell-Douglas F-15 Eagles of the 33rd TFW, Eglin AFB, Florida, engaged in two-versus-two aerial combat maneuvers with two Lockheed Martin F-16 Fighting Falcons of the Alabama Air National Guard, crashes at 1456 hrs near Lamison, Alabama, a small community roughly 80 miles (130 km) southwest of Montgomery. The pilot, Capt. Leo Moore of the 58th Tactical Fighter Squadron, ejected safely. Moore, unhurt, was rescued less than an hour later, said Sandy Mau, a Selma Times-Journal reporter, by an Air National Guard helicopter vectored to him from Danley Field by the F-16 pilots who were flying close enough to Moore to pinpoint his location, said S/Sgt. Dave Beaulieu, 33rd TFW spokesman. Tim Henderson, of nearby Millers Ferry, said that he saw Moore's jet flying low across his pasture minutes before the crash. "It was flying maybe a little over the treetops, very low", Henderson said. "He wasn't flying very fast to be flying so low, and it kind of sounded like the engine was cutting out." The fighter impacted on a ridge in a rural, virtually inaccessible area and Air Force investigators were having difficulty reaching the site, said Mau. The Eagle was completely destroyed. "It just burned up", said Beaulieu. The two F-15s had departed from Eglin at ~1410 hrs. to rendezvous with the F-16s. Moore's fighter was carrying an inert infrared-guided Sidewinder, Beaulieu said. He did not know how much training the airmen got in before the crash, which occurred about 120 miles (190 km) NE of Eglin. The pilot underwent a medical check at Eglin regional Hospital and then was sent home, said Beaulieu. "He's fine. He's pretty shaken up, but doing well."

8 July
Soviet Air Force Antonov An-12BP 'CCCP-11875, c/n 7345006, veers off the runway and crashes on landing at Cam Ranh Airport, Vietnam, killing 31 of 34 on board. The aircraft was returning to Cam Ranh following a landing accident at Ho Chi Minh City, its intended destination.

19 July
A U.S. Navy McDonnell-Douglas F/A-18 Hornet from Cecil Field, NAS Jacksonville, Florida, loses a 950-pound (430 kg) training bomb over Waldo, Florida, in the afternoon. The ordnance narrowly missed a home with four inside, bounced off a tree, skipped over a second home, and impacted in a field where the spotting charge exploded. No one is injured in the incident. Navy spokesman Bert Byers states that the pilot lost track of the bomb after it fell off the jet.

10 August
Soviet Air Force Ilyushin Il-76M CCCP-86718, c/n 073409259, stalls, nosedives and crashes on approach to Krechevitsy Airport during a training mission, killing all seven on board. The aircraft had been struck by lightning during the approach.

20 September
Lockheed L-188PF Electra, 6-P-1, c/n 1123, of Armada Argentina, Comando de Aviación Naval, crashes and breaks up at ~12:05 hrs following a loss of control during a go around at Trelew-Almirante Zar Naval Base in Argentina. There were no fatalities amongst 23 Navy personnel on board. "Almirante Zar base commander Captain Miguel Robles told a news conference that the plane's pilot, the co-pilot and the flight engineer were badly injured and others suffered minor injuries. Lijo said most of the passengers got out by their own means."

4 October
U.S. Air Force, Boeing KC-135A-BN Stratotanker, 56-3592, from Loring AFB Maine, crashes on final approach near Carlingford, New Brunswick, Canada after a fuel pump ignited vapor in the main tank. The in-flight explosion rendered the aircraft uncontrollable. All four crew members were killed.

12 October
While being refueled at Kirovabad (now Ganja), Azerbaijan, Soviet Air Force Antonov An-12BP CCCP-11229, c/n 4342006, is struck by a Sukhoi Su-24 fighter that had taken off from a taxiway by accident, killing seven: four of seven of the An-12, one of two of the Su-24, and two on the ground. Both aircraft burned out.

15 October
A U.S. Air Force General Dynamics F-16D Block 32F Fighting Falcon, 87-0369, c/n 5D-63, from Luke AFB, Arizona, crashes in the middle of the Boeing B-52 Stratofortress parking ramp at Carswell AFB, Texas, during a simulated airfield attack for an Operational Readiness Inspection for the 301st Tactical Fighter Wing (AFRES). The two pilots aboard the F-16D were both killed. Three B-52H aircraft parked nearby suffered minor damage.

18 October
En route to Ukraine with paratroopers, Soviet Air Force Ilyushin Il-76MD CCCP-76569, c/n 0033448421, crashes in the Caspian Sea some 1.5 km (0.93 mi) off Nasosnaya Air Base, Azerbaijan following an in-flight fire and resultant wing separation, killing all 57 on board. Five minutes after takeoff, the number one engine failed, caught fire and fell off, but debris from the engine punctured the fuel tank, starting a fire. The crew attempted to return to the airport, but the fire had weakened the left wing and it separated. A loss of control resulted and the aircraft crashed. The accident remains the deadliest in Azerbaijan.

26 October
Soviet Air Force Antonov An-26 09 crashes into the side of 2,310 m (7,580 ft) Mount Aag (35 km (22 mi) north of Petropavlovsk-Kamchatsky) while flying at 1,500 m (4,900 ft) after the pilot descended too low while flying VFR in IFR conditions, killing all 37 on board.

29 October
U.S. Navy North American T-2C Buckeye, BuNo 158876, of VT-19, crashes into Vultures' Row on the island of training carrier USS Lexington during a wave-off approach, operating in the Gulf of Mexico 22 miles (35 km) south of NAS Pensacola, Florida, killing five and injuring 20. Killed were the student pilot, three seamen, and a civilian employee of the Navy. This was the last aviation accident on the Lady Lex before her retirement to a museum ship at Corpus Christi, Texas. Killed in the crash were the pilot, Ensign Steven E. Pontell, 23, Columbia, Maryland, who was alone in the two-seat trainer; Lexington crewmen Petty Officer 3rd Class Burnett Kilgore Jr., 19, Holly Springs, Mississippi; Petty Officer 3rd Class Timmy L. Garroutte, 30, Memphis, Tennessee; Airman Lisa L. Mayo, 25, Oklahoma City, Oklahoma; and a civilian employee of DynCorp who had the contract to maintain Navy aircraft, Byron Gervis Courvelle, 32, Meridian, Mississippi.

9 November
A U.S. Navy LTV A-7E Corsair II jet fighter, of VA-205, preparing to land at Naval Air Station Atlanta, Dobbins Air Force Base, Georgia, piloted by LCDR Robert Conlyn, Jr., crashes into the Pine Village North apartment complex in Smyrna, Georgia, and burst into flames. Two civilians were killed; four civilians injured. Among the dead was a pregnant 24-year-old woman. Her five-year-old daughter survived with burns over half her body. Conlyn, call sign Cougar, stayed with the aircraft until the last possible moment. Conlyn suffered serious injuries but survived.

28 November
At 10:50 AM (JST/UTC +9) a United States Navy Kaman SH-2 Seasprite helicopter assigned to USS Oldendorf crashes into the ocean 20 miles (32 km) east of Nakagusuku Bay, Okinawa Prefecture. Of the three crew members aboard two were rescued; the third, co-pilot Ensign Ralph A. Barile, was never found. Rescued were the pilot Lieutenant Commander Alan R. Batterman and the sensor operator Petty Officer 3rd Class Todd Rhode. Oldendorf and aircraft from the Navy, Marine Corps and Air Force searched a wide area but the Navy called off the operation at 6:10 p.m., saying the missing crewman was 'presumed lost at sea.'

30 November
A Douglas A-4F Skyhawk—Bureau Number 152101, tail number '2101', c/n 13489, assigned to the US Navy Top Gun school, crashed short of the runaway at NAS Miramar, north of San Diego, California. The cause of the crash was loss of power to the engine. The pilot, United States Naval Academy graduate Lt. Cmdr. Stanley R. O'Connor, an instructor in the Top Gun school, ejected safely. This airframe had been ordered as the final A-4E but was delivered as the first A-4F model.

1 December
A leased CASA 212-300 Aviocar, 88–320, N296CA, c/n 296, operated by the US Army Intelligence and Security Command (INSCOM) for testing duties, crashes at NAS Patuxent River, Maryland. The crew had been conducting tests of tracking equipment during the short flight from Davison AAF at Fort Belvoir, Virginia. Aircraft crashed and sank into the water roughly 50 yards (46 m) offshore, in 45 feet (14 m) water, reportedly because the flight crew inadvertently selected "beta range" on the propellers at 800 feet (240 m), stalled and crashed into the river. Pilot CW4 Gaylord M. Bishop, copilot CW4 Howard E. Morton, SPC Peter Rivera-Santos, PFC Mark C. Elkins, and CIV Ronald N. Whiteley Jr. KWF.

28 December
McDonnell-Douglas F-15C-41-MC Eagle 86-0153, c/n 1000/C381, of the 59th TFS, 33rd TFW, based at Eglin AFB, crashes in the Gulf of Mexico, 40 miles (64 km) southeast of Apalachicola, Florida, pilot killed. The pilot was identified as Major Bartle M. Jackson, 31, Towson, Maryland. At the time of the crash, Jackson and three other pilots—a second F-15 pilot from Eglin and two Lockheed Martin F-16 pilots from Moody Air Force Base, Georgia, were taking part in a training mission the Air Force calls a 2v2, which pits two F-15s against two F-16s in a mock dogfight. It was not known whether the pilot had been able to bail out over the Gulf of Mexico. Other pilots in the area had not seen a parachute.

== See also ==
- List of accidents and incidents involving the Lockheed C-130 Hercules
- Lists of accidents and incidents involving military aircraft
