= Tempiute, Nevada =

- Ghost town
- Location within Nevada Location within the United States
- Coordinates: 37°39′09″N 115°38′09″W
- Country: United States
- State: Nevada
- County: Lincoln
- Elevation: 6,112 ft (1,863 m)

Tempiute is a ghost town in Lincoln County, Nevada United States.

== History ==
Silver was first discovered in the area in 1865. In 1868, additional silver lodes were found near the settlement. A mining district was established, but mining was difficult, due to insufficient water supplies. Water had to be transported by mules from springs, 12 miles (19 km) away. The settlement had a population of fifty miners in 1870. When the stamp-mill in nearby Crescent was shut down in 1871, mining in Tempiute was abandoned. The post office was named Tem Piute from February 1879 until January 1881 and then again from June 1882 until January 1883.

Tungsten ore was discovered nearby in 1916, but large-scale mining did not begin for another twenty years. The Lincoln Mines Company initiated mining operations in Tempiute in 1940, after building a mill. The mines were productive until the end of World War II, but declined in the next five years. After the price of tungsten rose in 1950, the mining camp was reestablished when the Wah Chang Trading Company, a New York-based tungsten importer and trading company, incorporated the entire mining district as the Black Rock Mining Company. From 1950—1956, Tempiute had a population of 700, and a school. The post Office was opened as Tempiute in February 1953 and closed in October 1957. During its most productive years, the Lincoln mine was one of the nation's primary producers of tungsten. When the price of tungsten declined in 1957, the mill was closed and the town was soon abandoned.

== See also ==
- Tempiute Mountain
